= Borgweg station =

Railway station in Winterhude, Germany

Borgweg
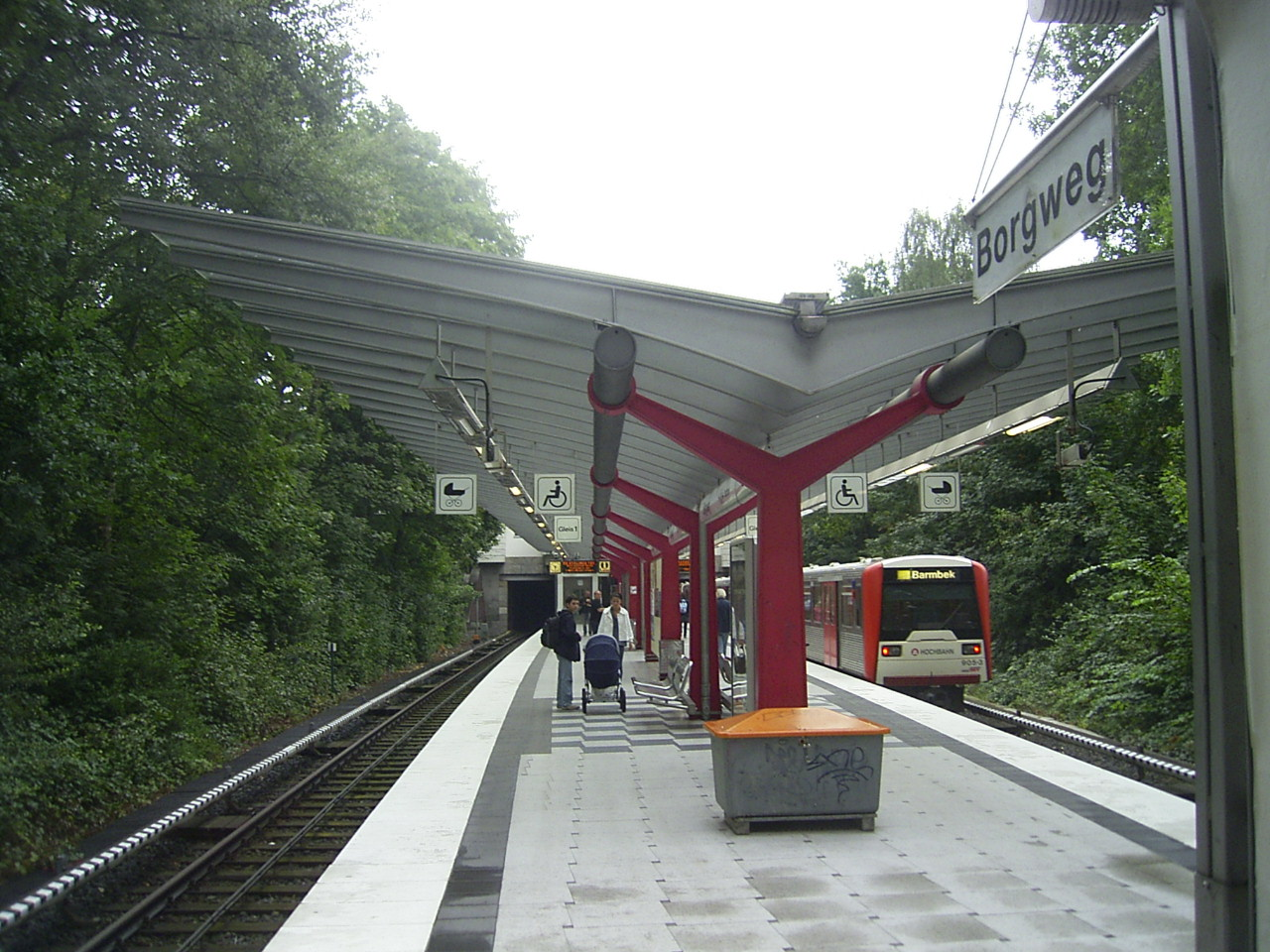

General information
- Location: Borgweg; 22303 Hamburg, Germany
- Coordinates: 53°35′27″N 10°00′54″E
- System: Hamburg U-Bahn station
- Operator: Hamburger Hochbahn AG
- Line: U3
- Platforms: 1 island platform
- Tracks: 2

Construction
- Structure type: Elevated
- Accessible: Yes

Other information
- Station code: HHA: BO
- Fare zone: HVV: A/103 and 105

History
- Opened: 10 May 1912

Services
Preceding station	Hamburg U-Bahn	Following station
Saarlandstraße towards Barmbek	U3	Sierichstraße towards Wandsbek-Gartenstadt
Location
- Location within Hamburg Location within Germany

Borgweg is a rapid transit station on the Hamburg U-Bahn line U3. The station was opened in May 1912 and is located in the Hamburg district of Winterhude, Germany. Winterhude is part of the borough of Hamburg-Nord.

== Service ==
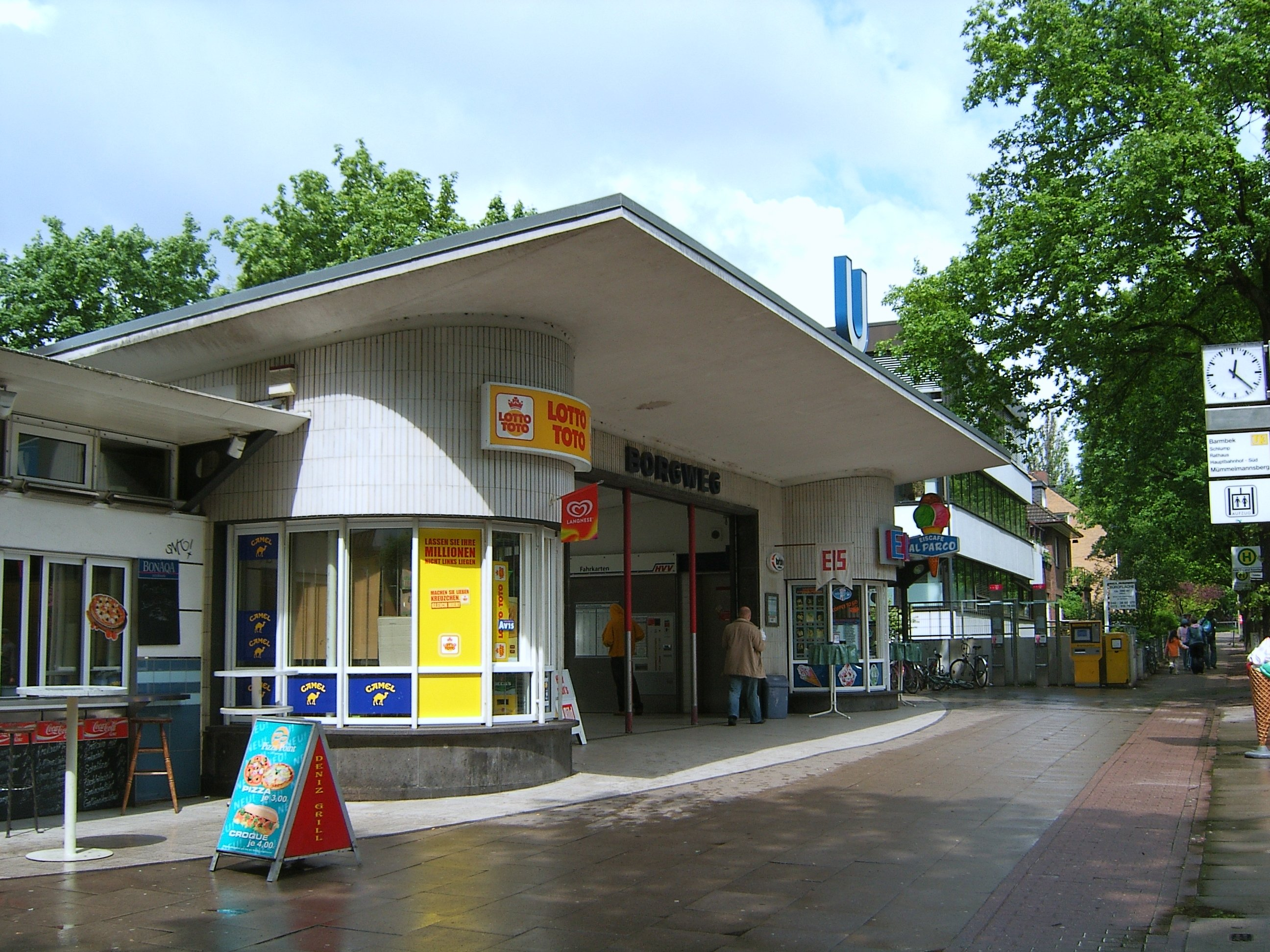
The station's entrance

=== Trains ===
Borgweg is served by Hamburg U-Bahn line U3; departures are every 5 minutes.

== See also ==
- List of Hamburg U-Bahn stations
