= Hoheluftbrücke station =

Railway station in Hamburg, Germany

Hoheluftbrücke
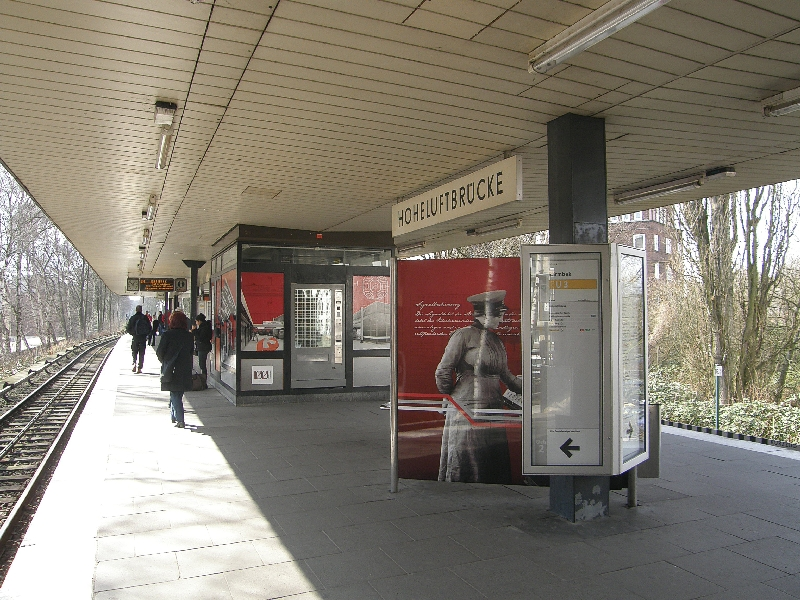

General information
- Location: Grindelberg; 20144 Hamburg, Germany
- Coordinates: 53°34′39″N 09°58′33″E
- System: Hamburg U-Bahn station
- Operator: Hamburger Hochbahn AG
- Line: U3
- Platforms: 1 island platform
- Tracks: 2

Construction
- Structure type: Elevated
- Accessible: Yes

Other information
- Station code: HHA: HO
- Fare zone: HVV: A/000, 101, and 103

History
- Opened: 25 May 1912

Services
Preceding station	Hamburg U-Bahn	Following station
Eppendorfer Baum towards Barmbek	U3	Schlump towards Wandsbek-Gartenstadt
Location
- Location within Hamburg Location within Germany

Hoheluftbrücke is a rapid transit station on the Hamburg U-Bahn line U3. The station was opened in May 1912 and is located in the Hamburg district of Harvestehude, Germany. Harvestehude is part of the borough of Eimsbüttel.

== Service ==
=== Trains ===
Hoheluftbrücke is served by Hamburg U-Bahn line U3; departures are every 5 minutes.

== See also ==
- List of Hamburg U-Bahn stations
