= Sierichstraße station =

Railway station in Hamburg, Germany

Sierichstraße
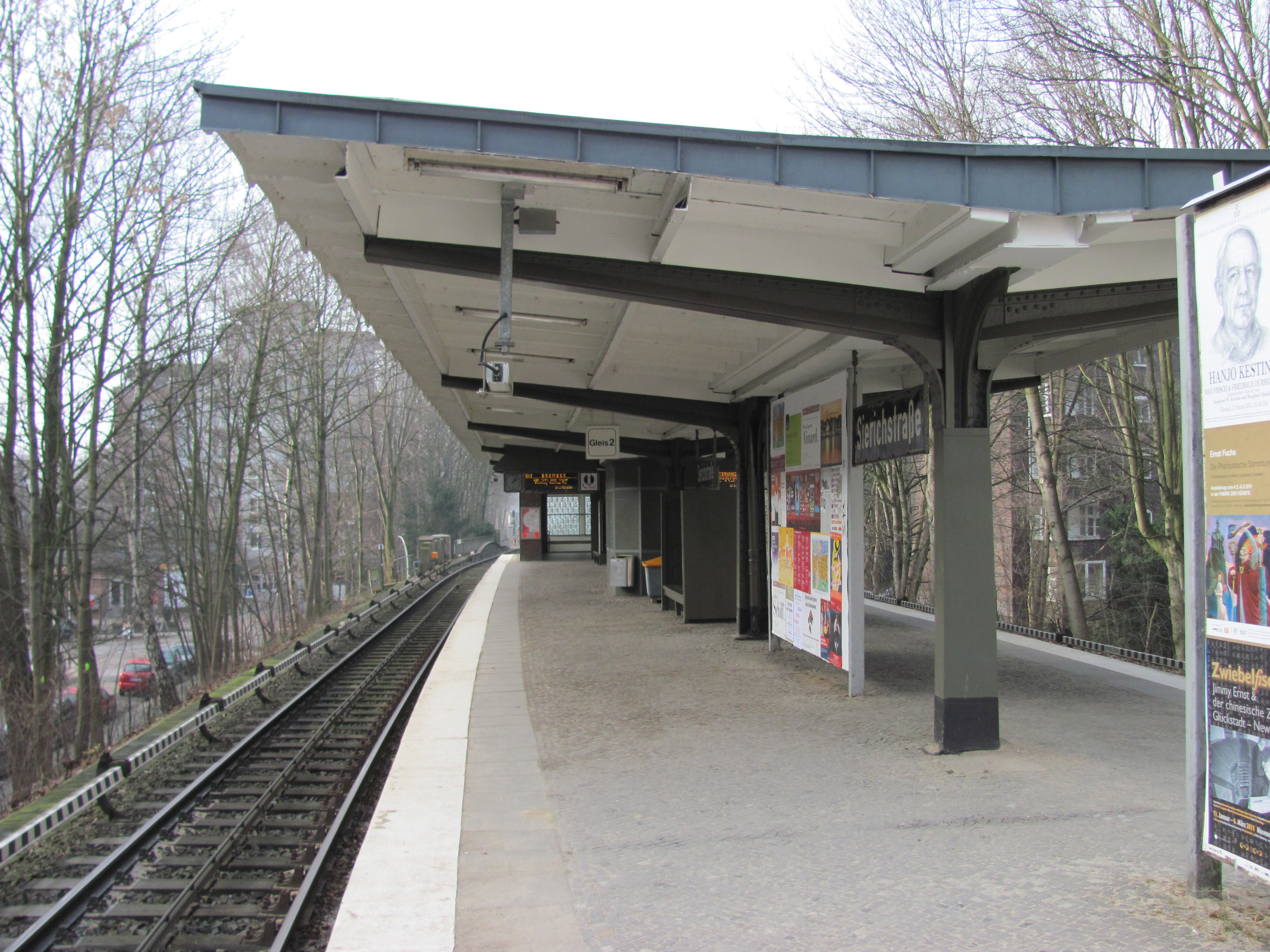

General information
- Location: Sierichstraße; 22999 Hamburg, Germany
- Coordinates: 53°35′25″N 10°00′04″E
- System: Hamburg U-Bahn station
- Operator: Hamburger Hochbahn AG
- Line: U3
- Platforms: 1 island platform
- Tracks: 2

Construction
- Structure type: Elevated

Other information
- Station code: HHA: SI
- Fare zone: HVV: A/000, 103, and 105

History
- Opened: 10 May 1912; 114 years ago
- Electrified: at opening

Services
Preceding station	Hamburg U-Bahn	Following station
Borgweg towards Barmbek	U3	Kellinghusenstraße towards Wandsbek-Gartenstadt
Location
- Location within Hamburg Location within Germany

Sierichstraße is a rapid transit station on the Hamburg U-Bahn line U3. The station was opened in May 1912 and is located in the Hamburg district of Winterhude, Germany. Winterhude is part of the borough of Hamburg-Nord.

== Service ==
Sierichstraße is served by Hamburg U-Bahn line U3; departures are every 5 minutes.

== Gallery ==
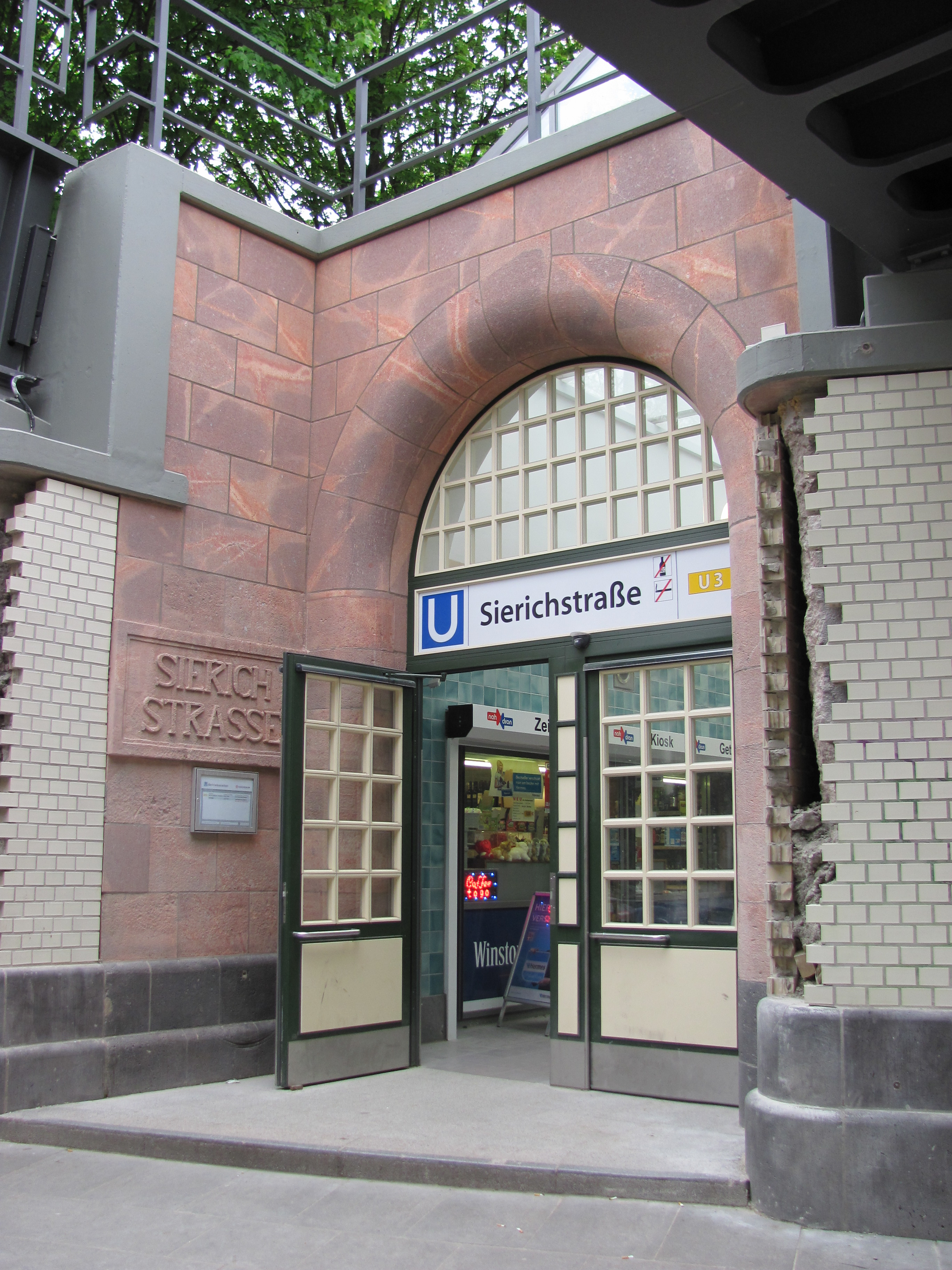

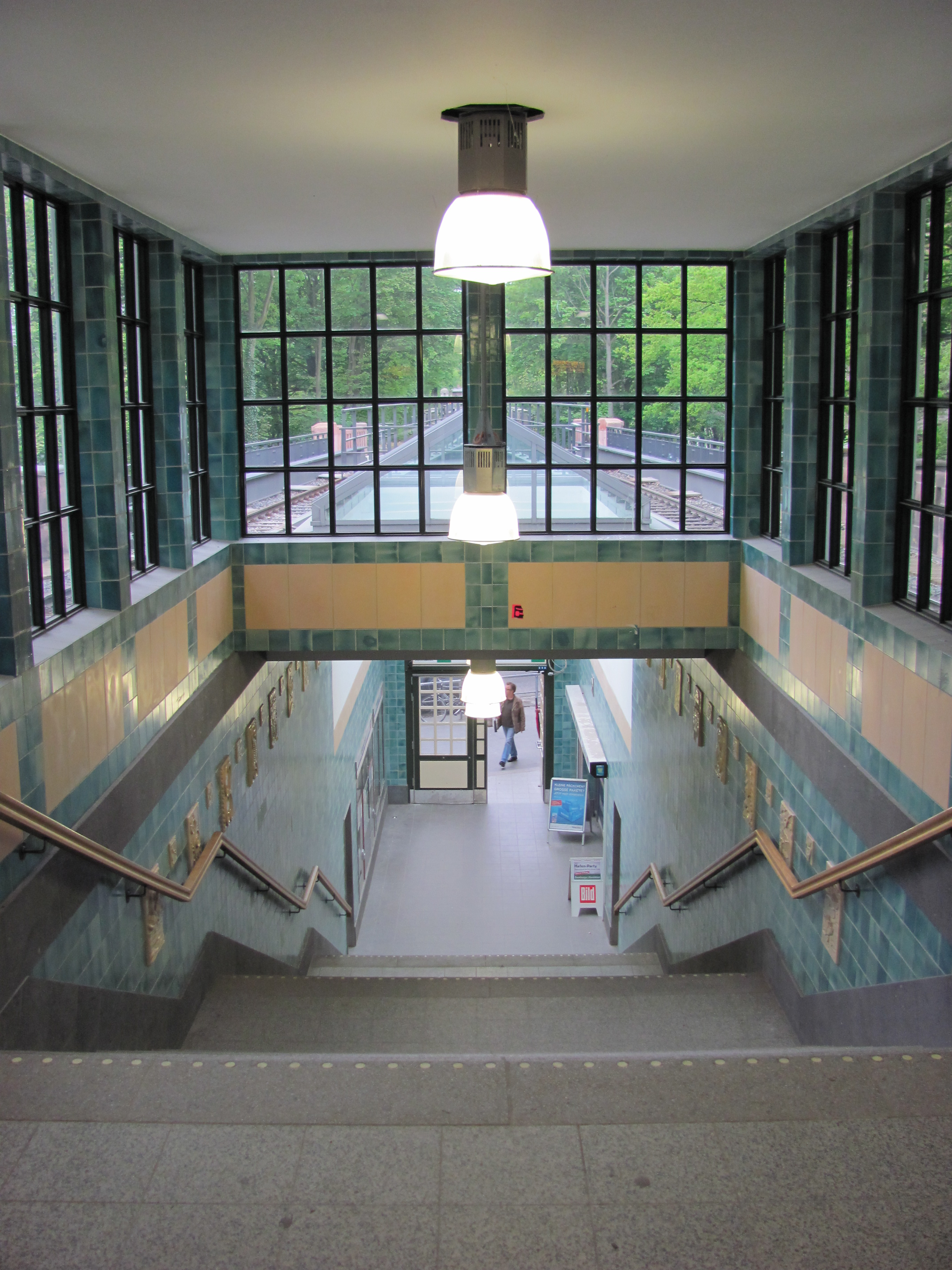

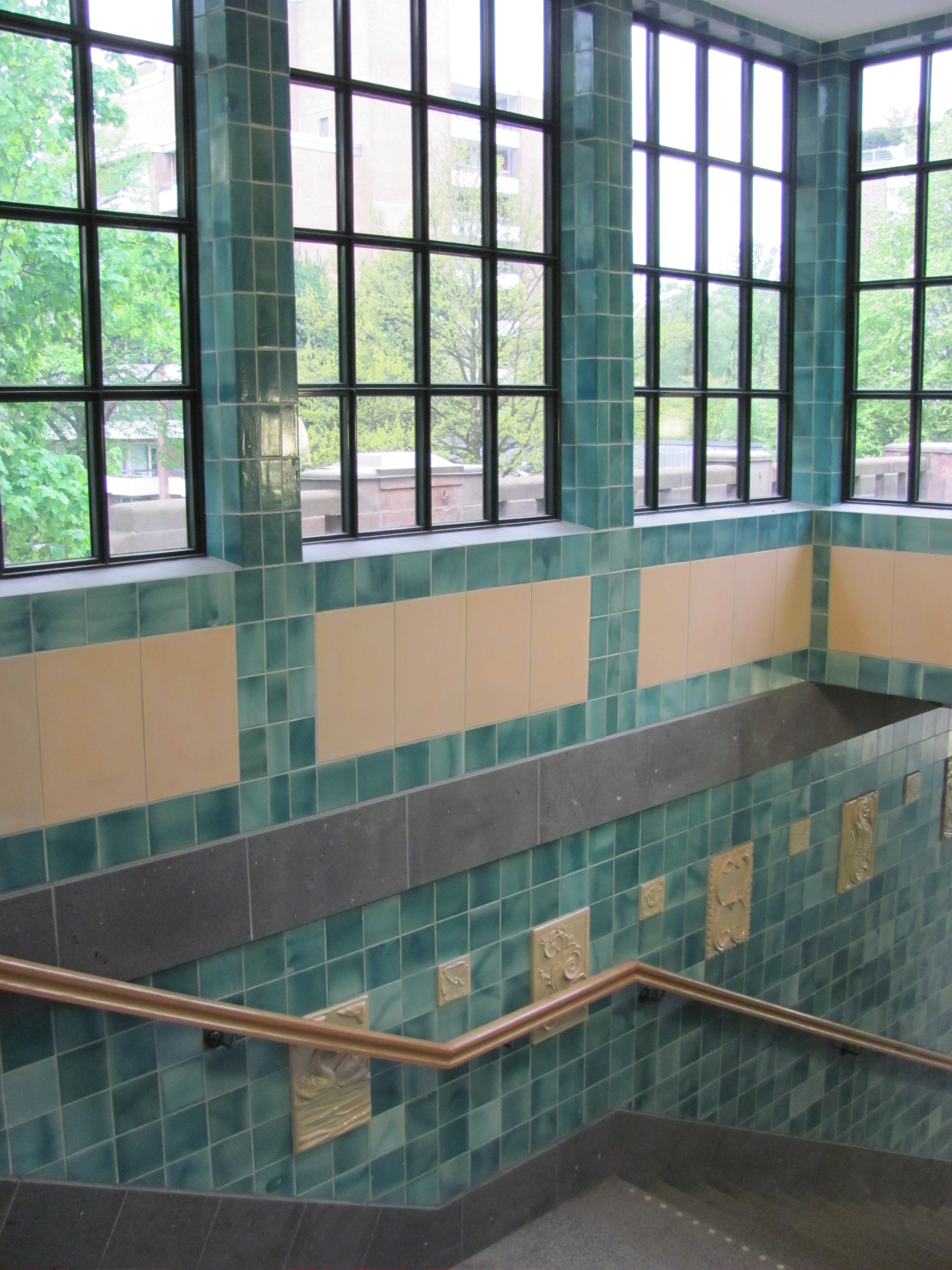

== See also ==
- List of Hamburg U-Bahn stations
