= Kellinghusenstraße station =

Railway station in Hamburg, Germany

Kellinghusenstraße
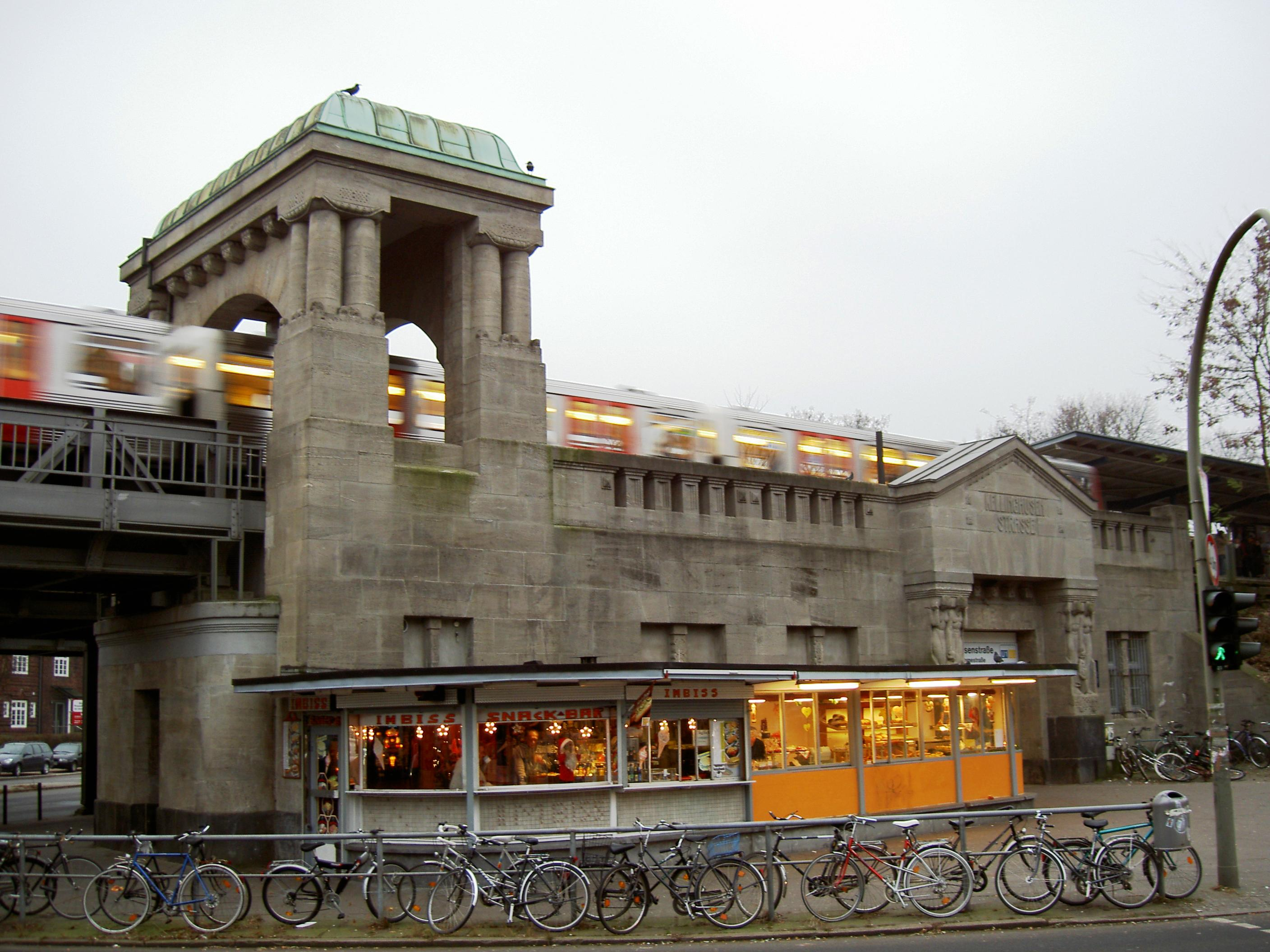

General information
- Location: Kellinghusenstraße; 20249 Hamburg, Germany
- Coordinates: 53°35′20″N 09°59′28″E
- System: Hamburg U-Bahn station
- Operator: Hamburger Hochbahn AG
- Line: U1 U3
- Platforms: 2 island platforms
- Tracks: 4
- Connections: Bus

Construction
- Structure type: Elevated
- Accessible: Yes

Other information
- Station code: HHA: KE
- Fare zone: HVV: A/000, 103, and 105

History
- Opened: 10 May 1912

Services
Preceding station	Hamburg U-Bahn	Following station
Hudtwalckerstraße towards Norderstedt Mitte	U1	Klosterstern towards Großhansdorf or Ohlstedt
Sierichstraße towards Barmbek	U3	Eppendorfer Baum towards Wandsbek-Gartenstadt
Location
- Location within Hamburg Location within Schleswig-Holstein Location within Germany Location within Europe

Kellinghusenstraße is a railway station located in Eppendorf, Hamburg, Germany. It serves as a transfer station between Hamburg U-Bahn lines U1 and U3, as well as a bus stop serving the lines 22, 25 & 617.

== History ==
The area of Kellinghusenpark and around the station used to be owned by a Hamburg mayor, Dr. Heinrich Kellinghusen (1796 - 1879). After a station called Oderfelder Straße had originally been planned south-west of the current station, the plans were revised to include a branch line to Ohlsdorf, with the new station having four lines.

The architects for the new station were Ludwig Raabe und Otto Wöhleke, who also designed Landungsbrücken and Mundsburg stations, and the stone figures decorating the station were sculpted by Johann Michael Bossard (1874-1950).

Kellinghusenstraße station was built from 1909 to 1910 on an embankment for which some houses needed to be demolished.

When the station opened on 10 May 1912, it was a terminus for trains from Barmbeck, now Barmbek. From 25 May 1912, it was no longer a terminal, as the trains ran to Millerntor, now St. Pauli. These trains used the outer two lines of the four. The inner two lines were used from 1 December 1914, when the line from Kellinghusenstraße to Ohlsdorf was opened, and the station was a terminus for that line until 2 June 1929, when the line was extended to Stephansplatz. In the meantime, in 1926, a bridge designed by Walther Puritz was built between the two platforms at the south end after they had been lengthened from 60 to 90 meters.

In 2021 a bicycle parking station was constructed between the station building and the bus stop. The project consists of 1000 bicycle parking spaces, with 600 located inside the actual structure distributed on two levels. 17 of the spaces have been allocated for cargo bikes.

== Location ==
The station is close to the 1914-built art deco Holthusenbad swimming baths and to Kellinghusenpark, and is on the corner of Kellinghusenstraße and Goernestraße.

== Station layout ==
The station is on an embankment with two island platforms, joined by a bridge at the south end. There is an exit at its north end on the corner of Kellinghusenstraße and Goernestraße, with steps and elevators leading to each platform. On the entrance level is a shop, which also sells tickets, but no lockerboxes. No personnel attends the station but there are ticket machines, CCTV, and emergency and information telephones.

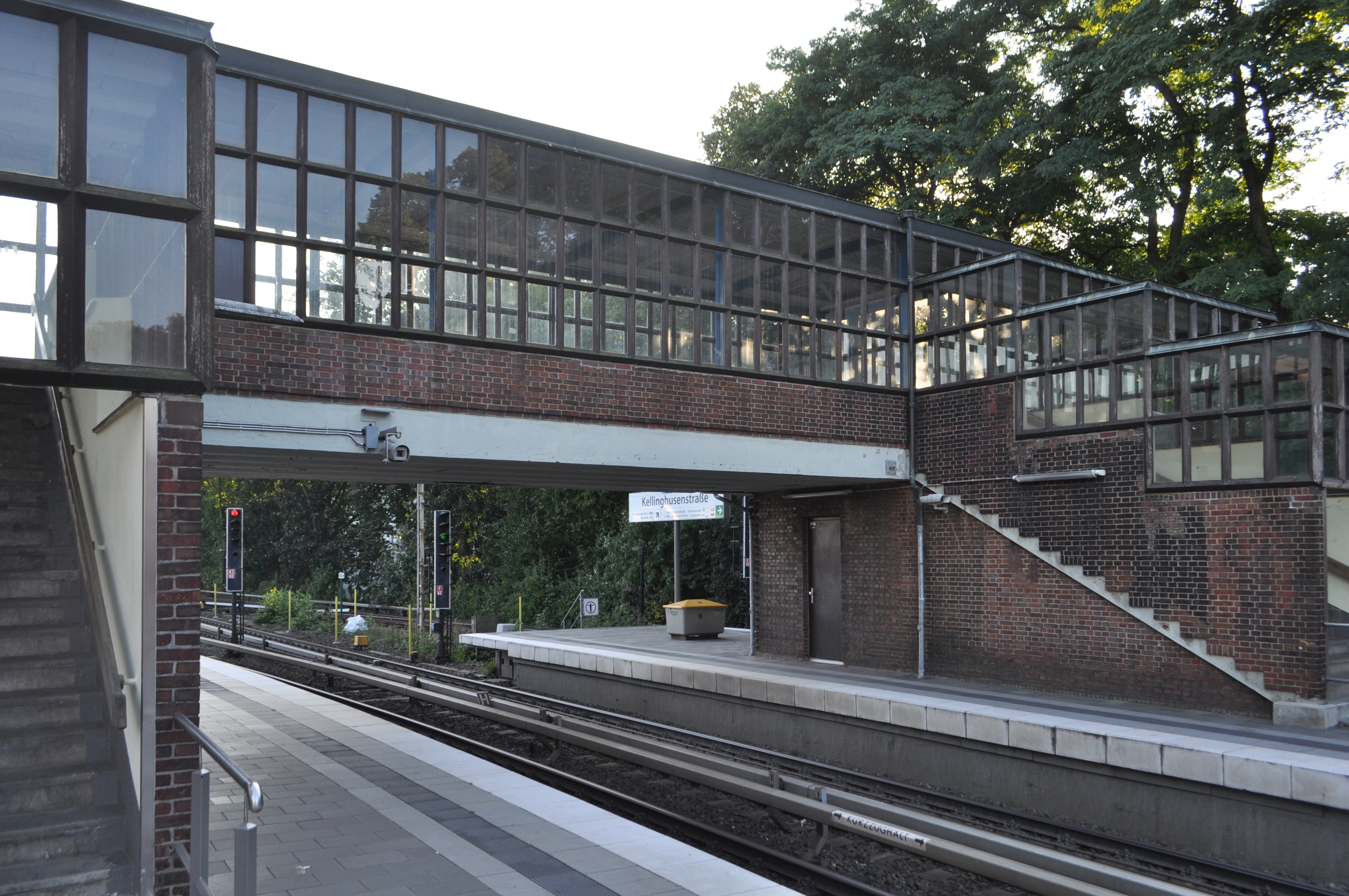

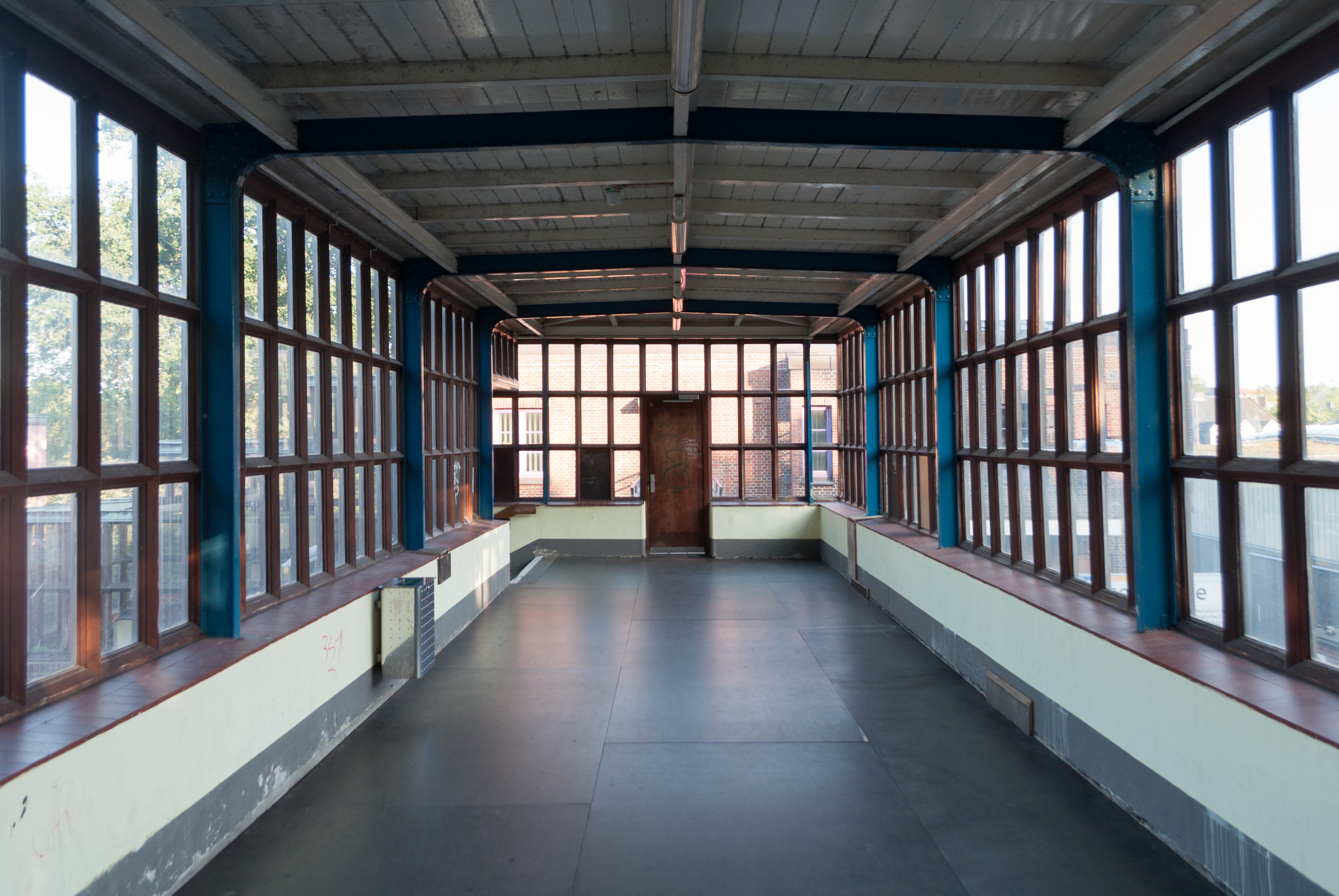

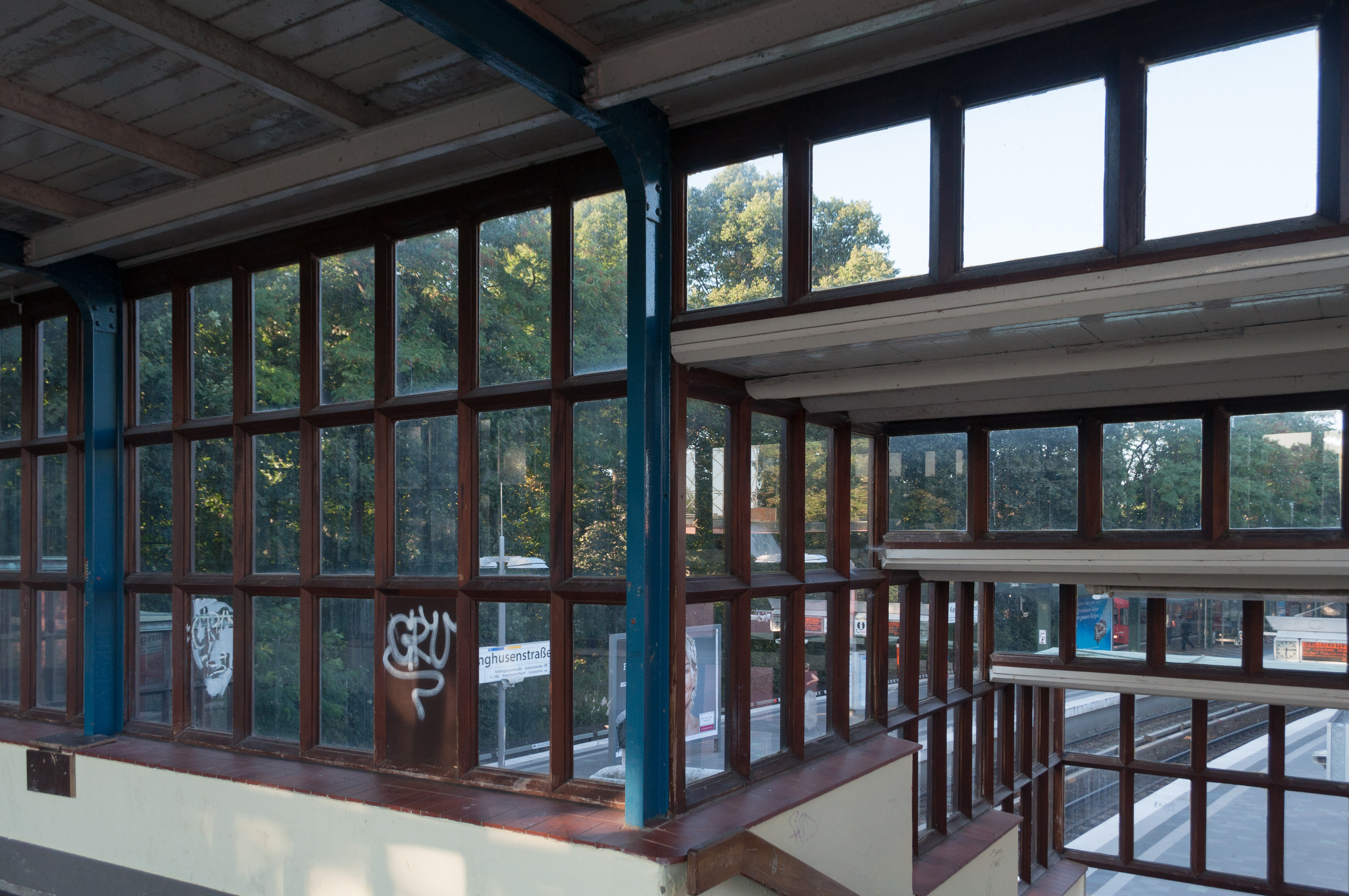

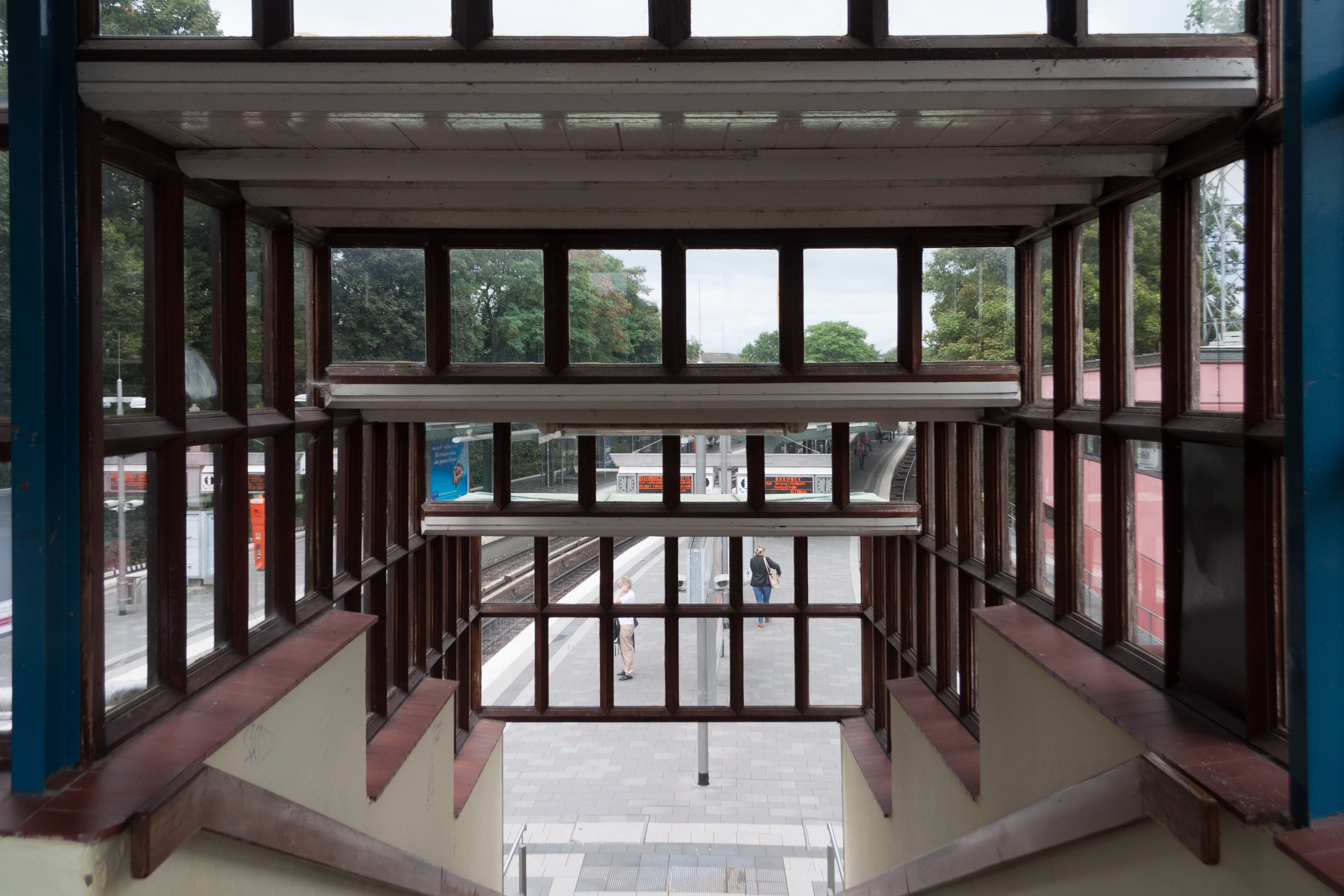

== Service ==
Kellinghusenstraße is served by Hamburg U-Bahn lines U1 and U3; departures are every 5 minutes.

== See also ==
- Hamburger Verkehrsverbund (Public transport association for the Hamburg area)
- Hamburger Hochbahn (Operator of the Hamburg U-Bahn)
