= Saarlandstraße station =

Railway station in Winterhude, Germany

Saarlandstraße
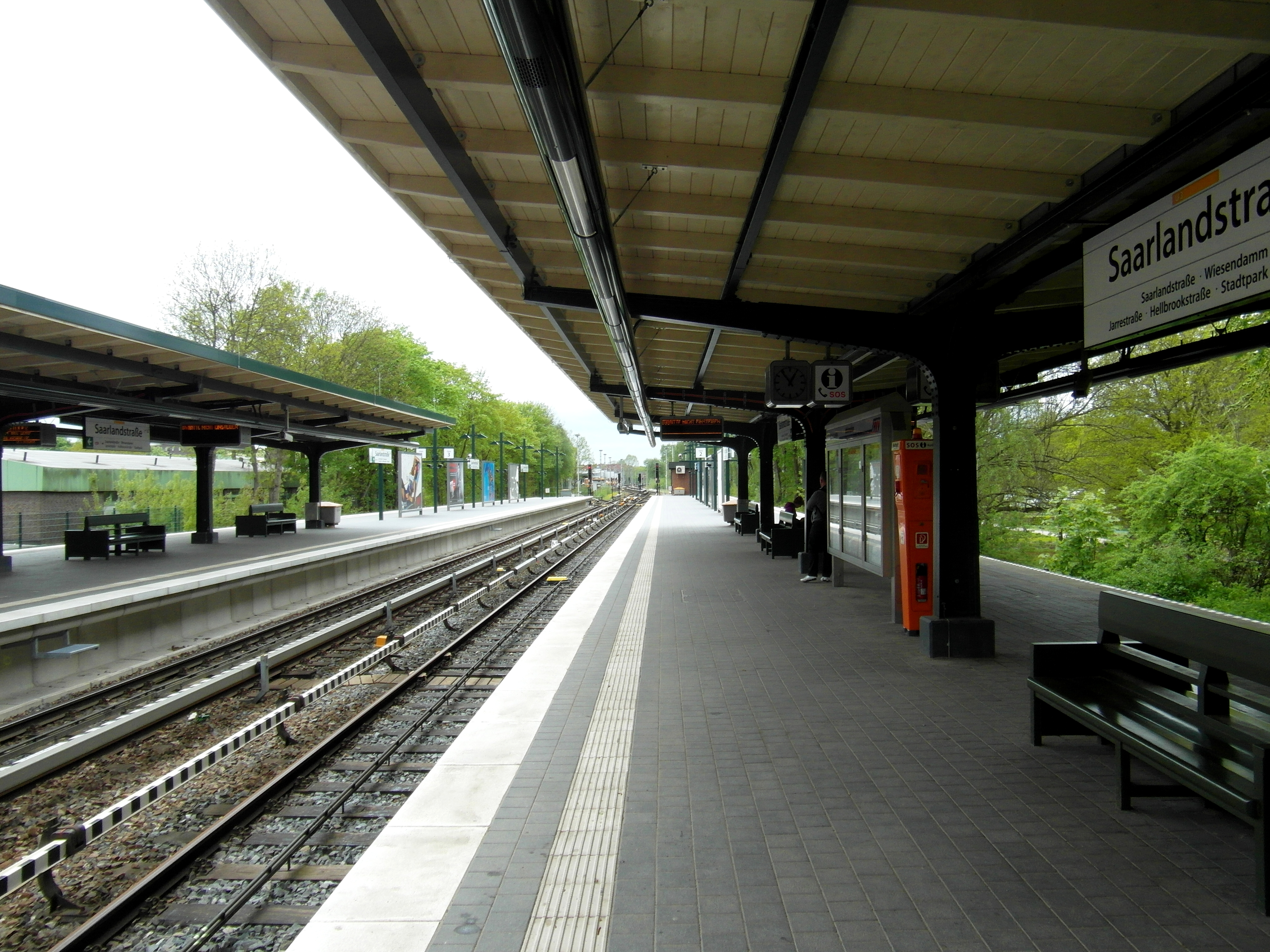

General information
- Location: Saarlandstraße; 22303 Hamburg, Germany
- Coordinates: 53°35′20″N 10°01′57″E
- System: Hamburg U-Bahn station
- Operator: Hamburger Hochbahn AG
- Line: U3
- Platforms: 2 island platforms
- Tracks: 4

Construction
- Structure type: Elevated

Other information
- Station code: HHA: SA
- Fare zone: HVV: A/103 and 105

History
- Opened: 10 May 1912; 114 years ago
- Former names: 1912-1924 Flurstraße; 1924-1970 Stadtpark

Services
Preceding station	Hamburg U-Bahn	Following station
Barmbek Terminus	U3	Borgweg towards Wandsbek-Gartenstadt
Location
- Location within Hamburg Location within Germany

Saarlandstraße is a rapid transit station on the Hamburg U-Bahn line U3. The station was opened in May 1912 and is located in the Hamburg district of Winterhude, Germany. Winterhude is part of the borough of Hamburg-Nord.

== Service ==
=== Trains ===
Saarlandstraße is served by Hamburg U-Bahn line U3; departures are every 5 minutes.

== Gallery ==
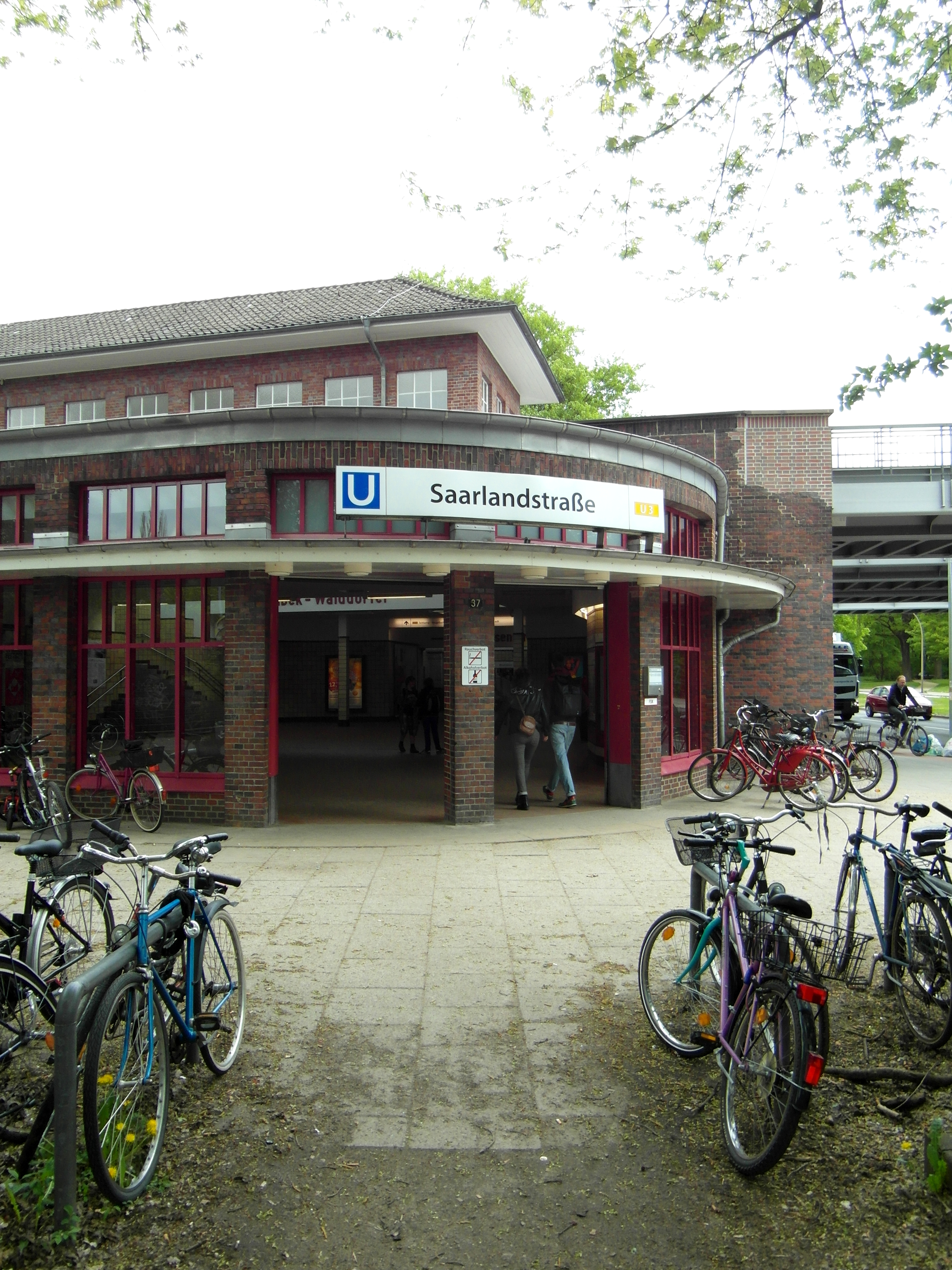

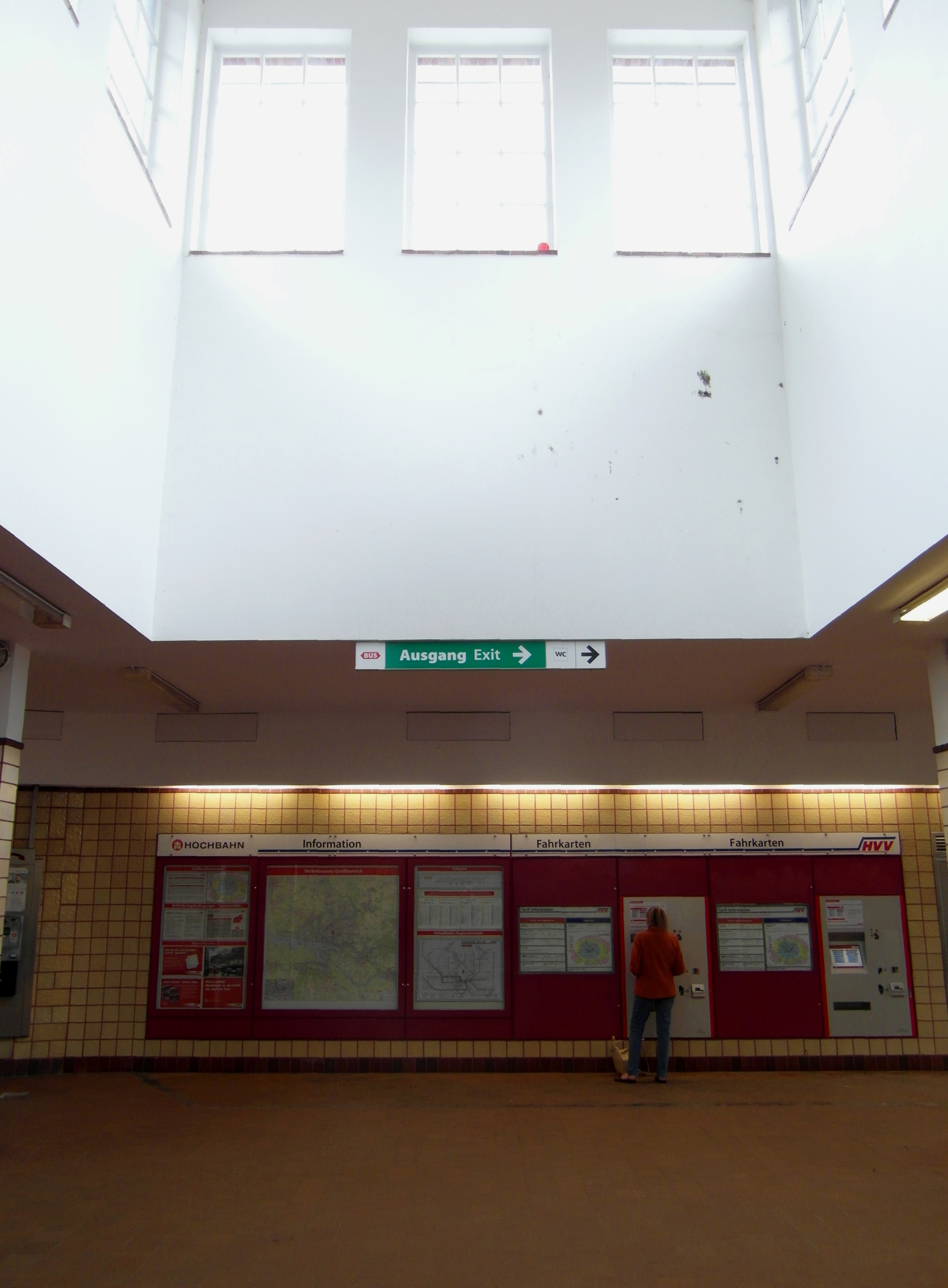

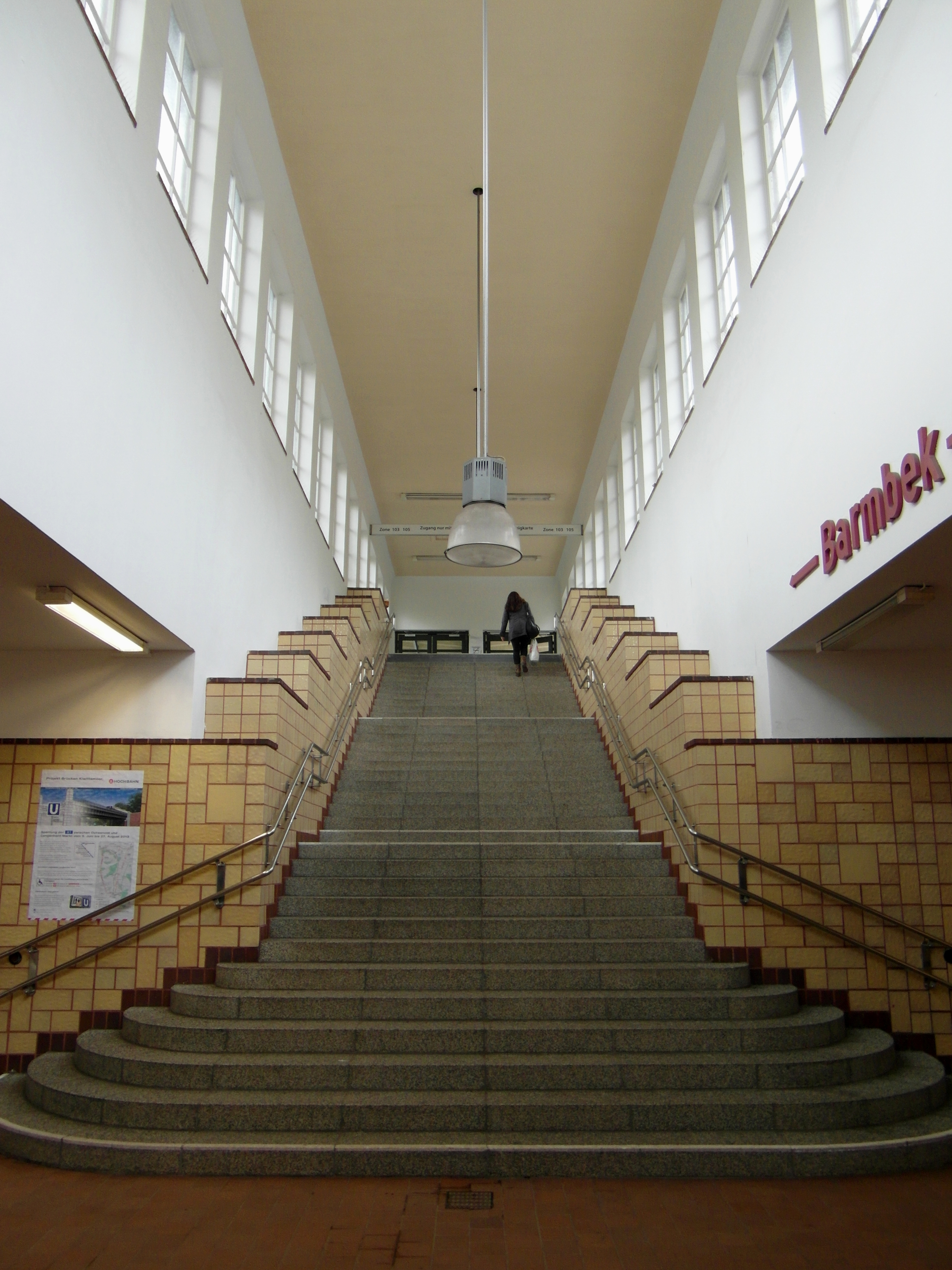

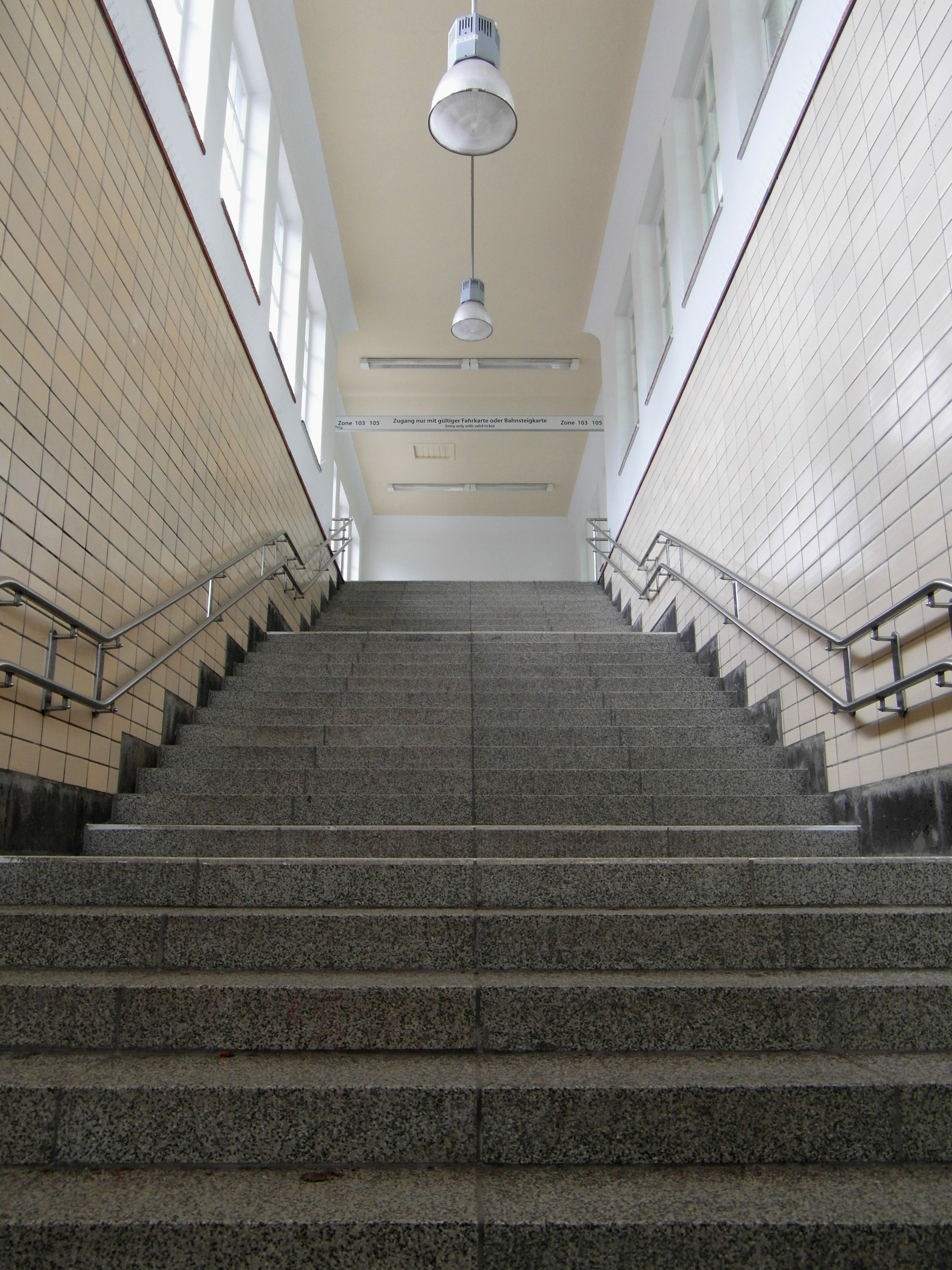

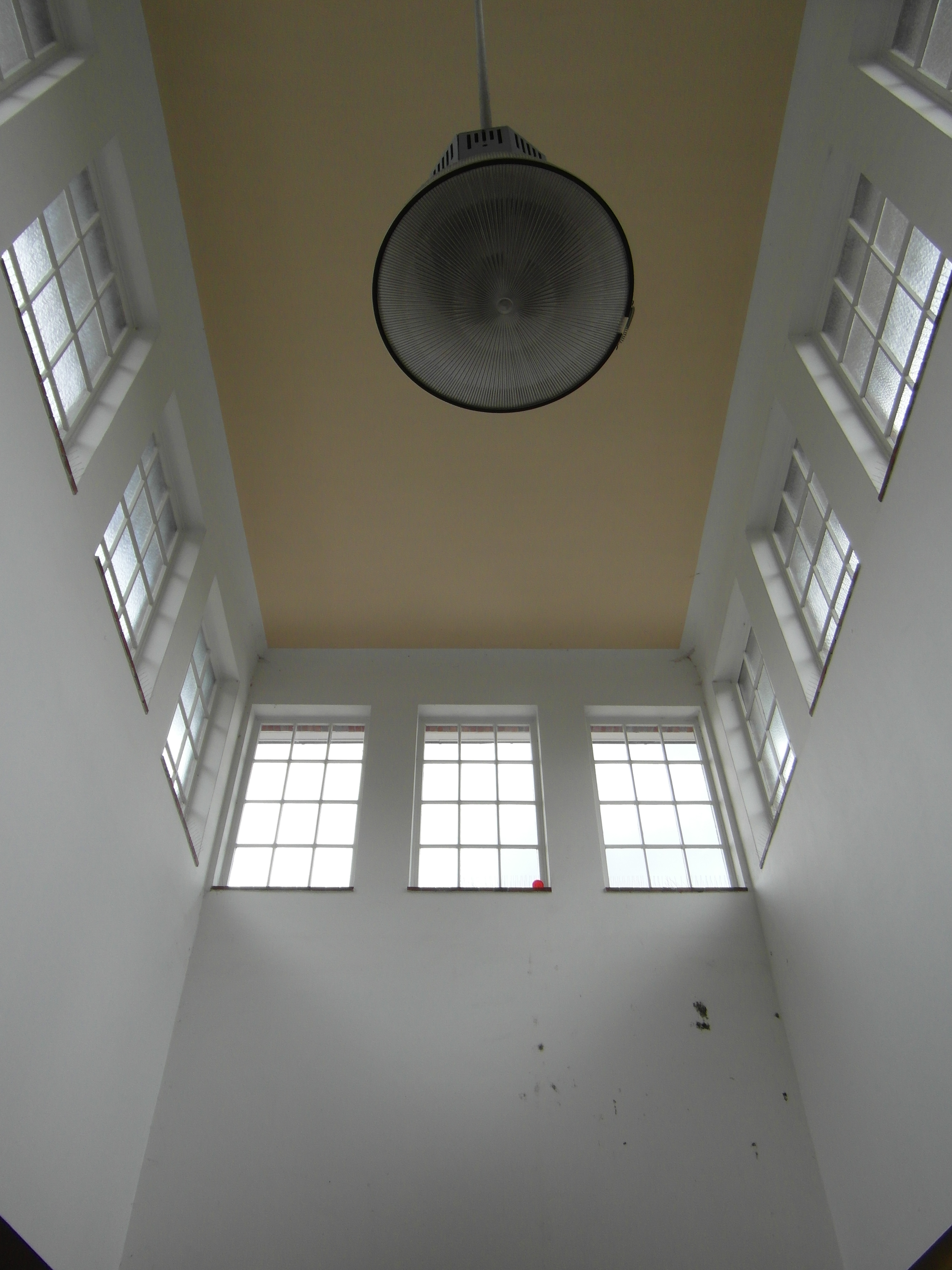

== See also ==
- List of Hamburg U-Bahn stations
