= Habichtstraße station =

Railway station in Hamburg, Germany

Habichtstraße
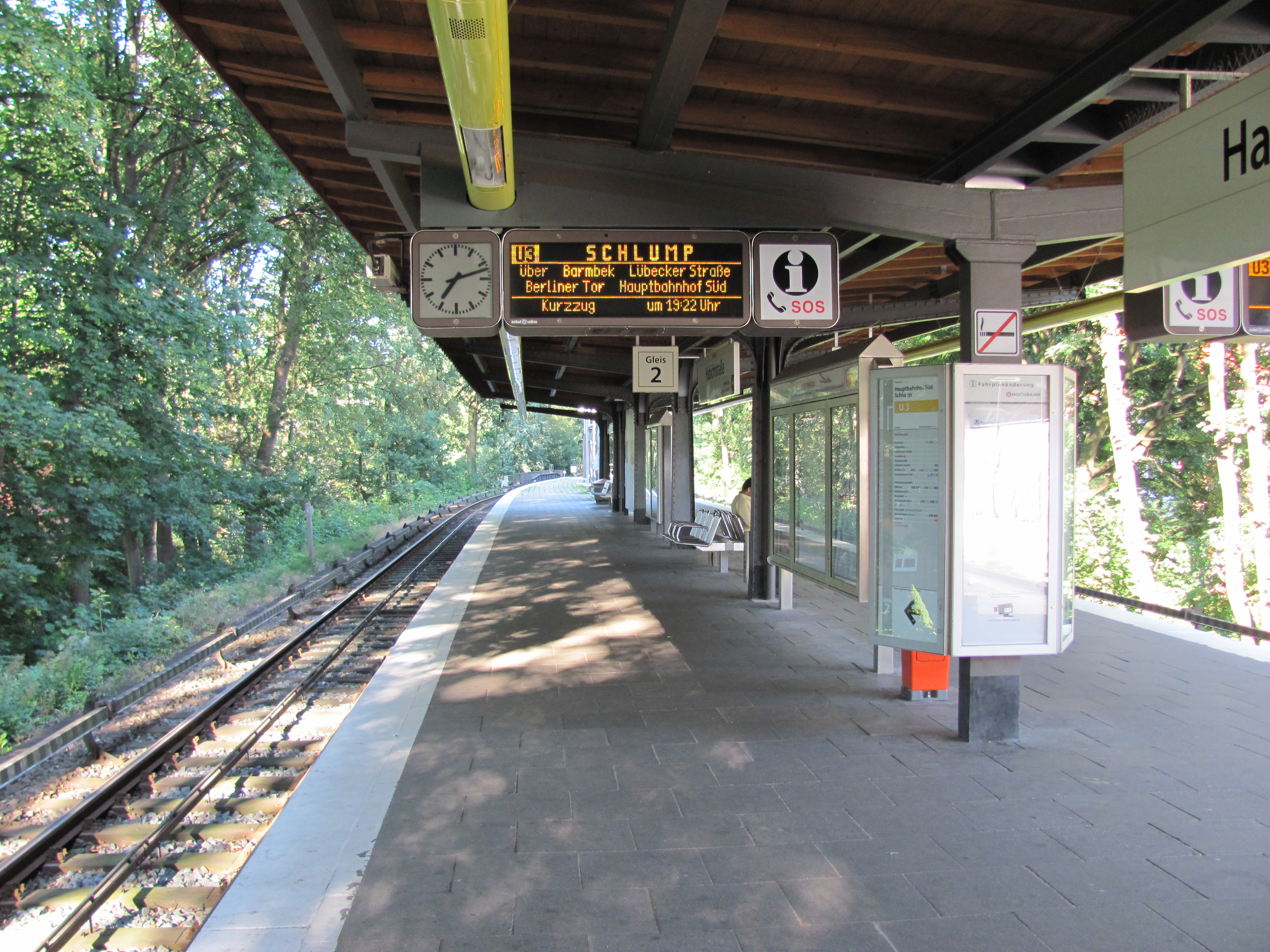

General information
- Location: Habichtstraße; 22307 Hamburg, Germany
- Coordinates: 53°35′37″N 10°03′07″E
- System: Hamburg U-Bahn station
- Operator: Hamburger Hochbahn AG
- Line: U3
- Platforms: 1 island platform
- Tracks: 2

Construction
- Structure type: Elevated
- Accessible: Yes
- Architect: 1913-1916 station erected by Fritz Schumacher

Other information
- Station code: HHA: HA
- Fare zone: HVV: A/105

History
- Opened: 23 June 1930; 96 years ago
- Electrified: at opening

Services
Preceding station	Hamburg U-Bahn	Following station
Barmbek towards Barmbek via Hauptbahnhof Süd	U3	Wandsbek-Gartenstadt Terminus
Location
- Location within Hamburg Location within Germany

Habichtstraße is an elevated rapid transit station located in the Hamburg district of Barmbek-Nord, Germany. The station was opened in 1930 and is served by Hamburg U-Bahn line U3.

== Service ==
=== Trains ===
Habichtstraße is served by Hamburg U-Bahn line U3; departures are every 10 minutes. The travel time to Hamburg Hauptbahnhof takes about 15 minutes.

== Gallery ==
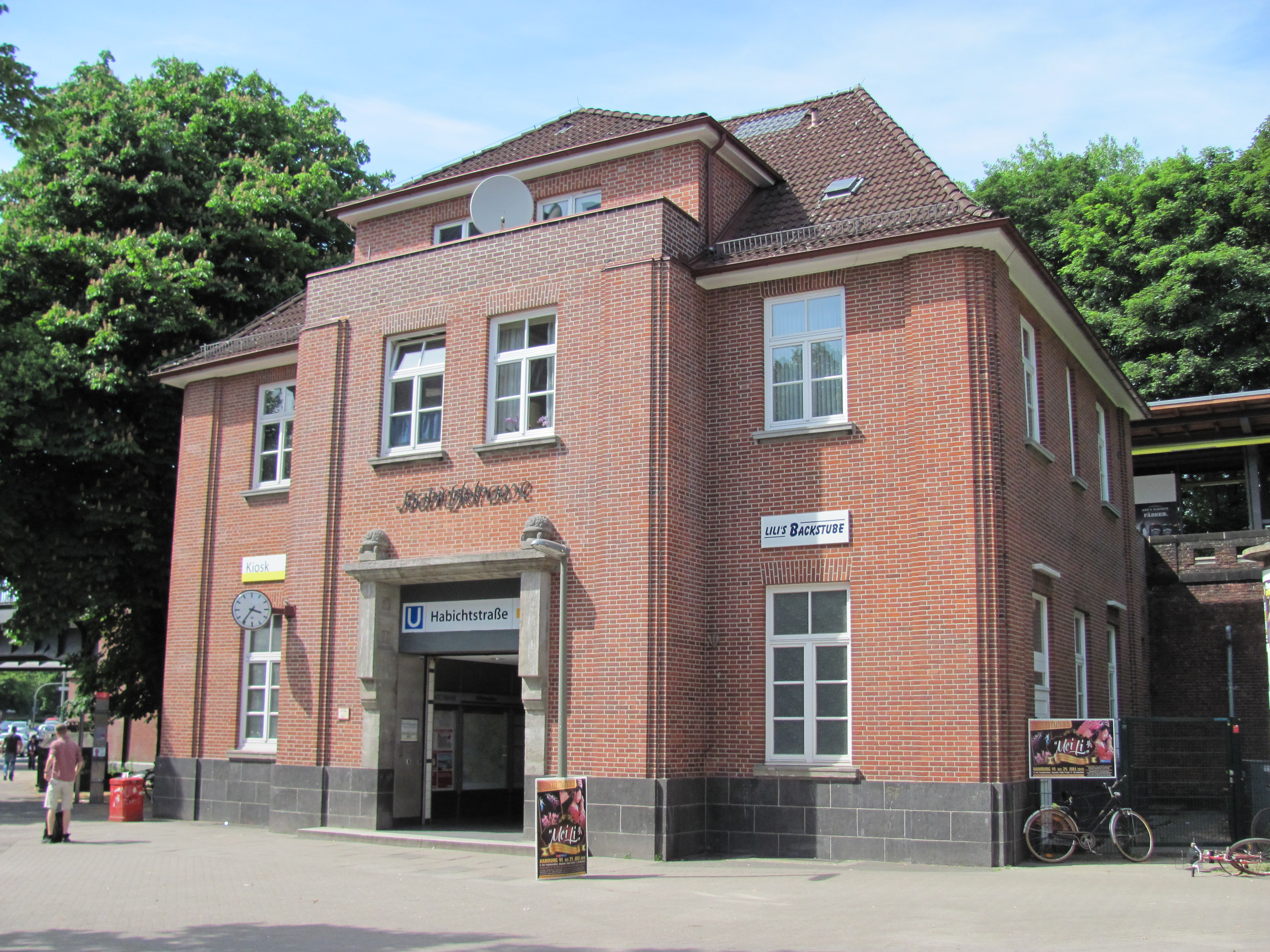
The station's exterior

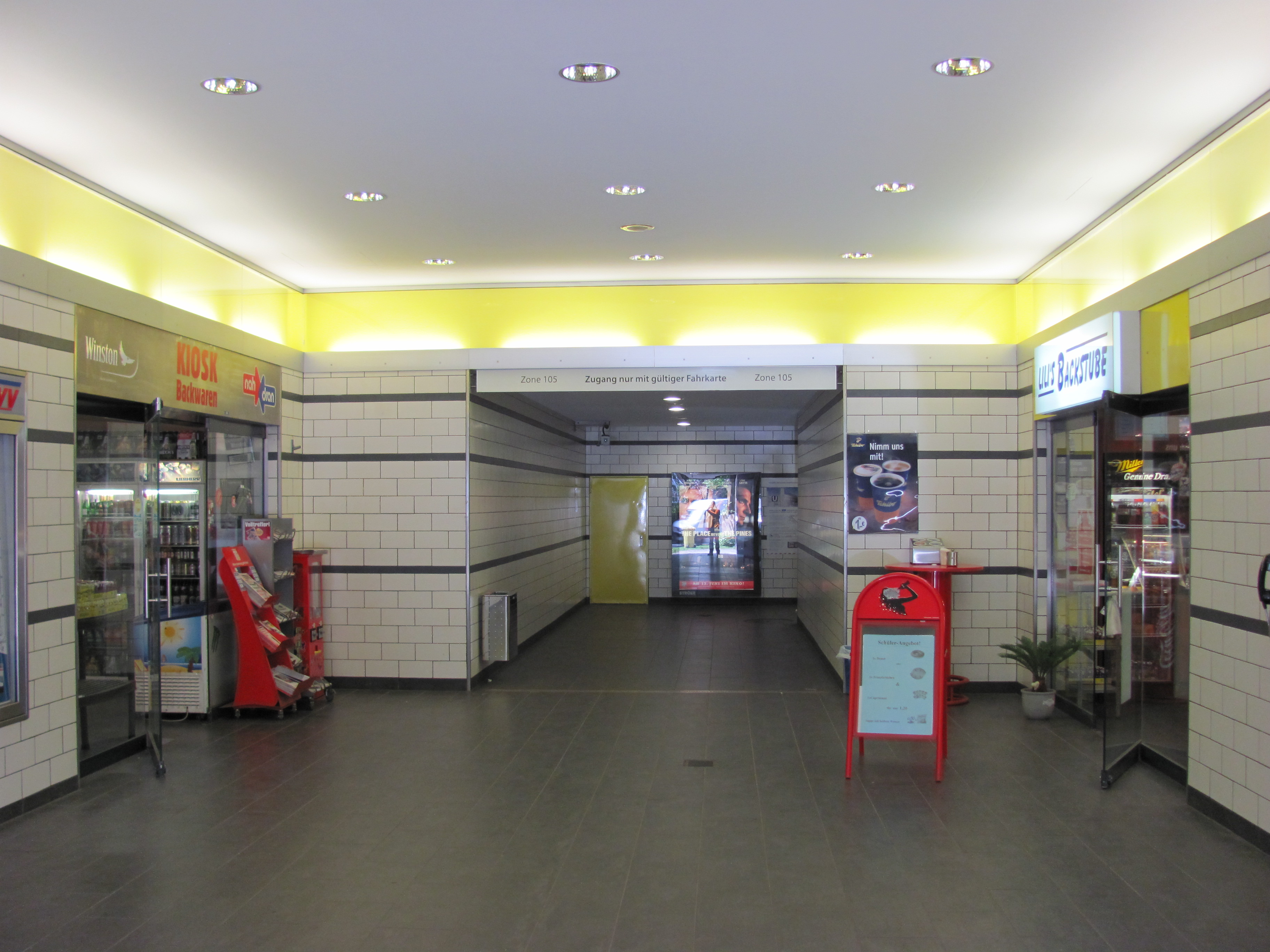
The station's interior

== See also ==
- List of Hamburg U-Bahn stations
