= Barmbek station =

Railway station and transport hub in Hamburg, Germany

Barmbek
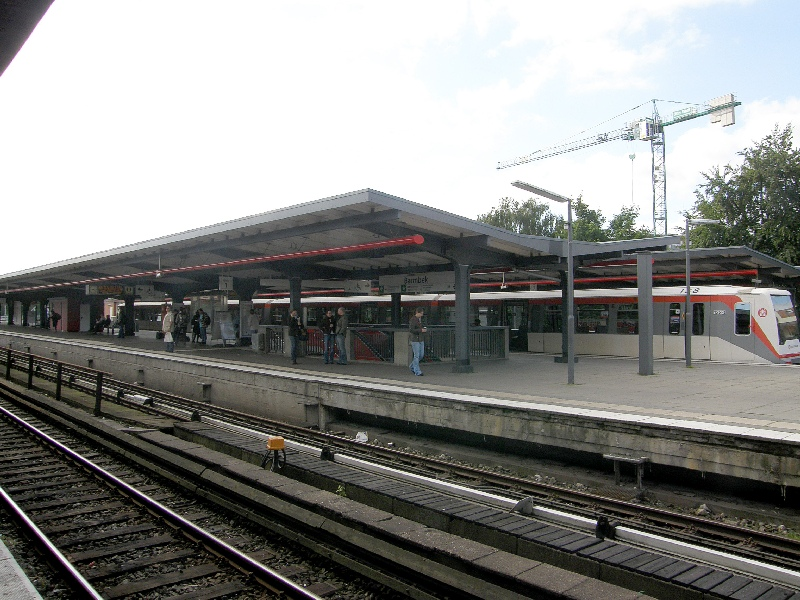

General information
- Location: Fuhlsbüttler Straße 91; 22305 Hamburg, Germany
- Coordinates: 53°35′13″N 10°2′41″E
- Lines: S1 U3
- Platforms: 3
- Tracks: 6
- Connections: Bus, Taxi

Construction
- Structure type: Elevated
- Platform levels: 1
- Cycle facilities: Yes
- Accessible: Yes

Other information
- Fare zone: HVV: A/103 and 105

History
- Opened: 5 December 1906; 119 years ago 15 February 1912; 114 years ago
- Rebuilt: 1965, end 1980s
- Electrified: 29 January 1908; 118 years ago, 6.3 kV AC system (overhead; turned off in 1955) at opening 10 April 1941; 85 years ago, 1.2 kV DC system (3rd rail)
- Former names: 1906-1947 Barmbeck

Services
Preceding station	Hamburg S-Bahn	Following station
Friedrichsberg towards Wedel	S1	Alte Wöhr towards Poppenbüttel or Hamburg Airport
Preceding station	Hamburg U-Bahn	Following station
Saarlandstraße towards Wandsbek-Gartenstadt via Hauptbahnhof Süd	U3	Terminus
Dehnhaide towards Barmbek via Hauptbahnhof Süd	U3	Habichtstraße towards Wandsbek-Gartenstadt
Location
- Location within Hamburg Location within Schleswig-Holstein Location within Germany Location within Europe

Barmbek is a railway station and transport hub in Hamburg, Germany, for the underground railway (U-Bahn) system and the suburban railway (S-Bahn) system. The station is located in the district of Barmbek-Nord, Germany. Barmbek-Nord is part of the borough of Hamburg-Nord.

The suburban railway part of the station at the north side is listed as Barmbek (S-Bahn), No. 0376 and category 4 by the Deutsche Bahn. The DS 100 code is ABAG.

== History ==
In November 1866, a Barmbek line was built for horsecars by the Hamburger Pferde-Eisenbahn-Gesellschaft (Hamburg horsecar railway company). On 11 April 1895, the first new built electric tram line was opened from Barmbeker Zoll (Barmbek customs facilities) to Ohlsdorf Cemetery, and on 6 December 1906, the Hamburg-Altonaer Stadt- und Vortbahn (City and suburban railway) — since 1934 abbreviated Hamburg S-Bahn — opened the double track line Ohlsdorf – Blankenese, including Barmbek station. Planned as an electric railway with overhead lines, the trains were first steam powered, because of difficulties concerning the construction of the electrical installations and a delay delivering the engines. In 1912, the Hamburger Hochbahn opened first part of the Hamburg U-Bahn circle line from Barmbek station via Mundsburg to central station. Until 1947, Barmbek station was written Barmbeck. In end 1980s, constructing the bus station at the north side of Barmbek station gave the whole station the new westside entrance.

== Layout ==
Barmbek is an elevated railway station and a bus station for several bus routes north of it. There are three platforms with six tracks at the same level. The two U-Bahn platforms are served by trains of the branches of line U3 side by side at the same time to ease the change between it.

In the westside entrance level are some shops, escalators and lifts to the platforms and to the bus station. There is an at-grade entrance at the eastside with an exit to the south only as well. The station is fully accessible for handicapped persons.

== Services ==
The Hamburg U-Bahn line U3 and line S1 of the Hamburg S-Bahn serve Barmbek station.

== Gallery ==
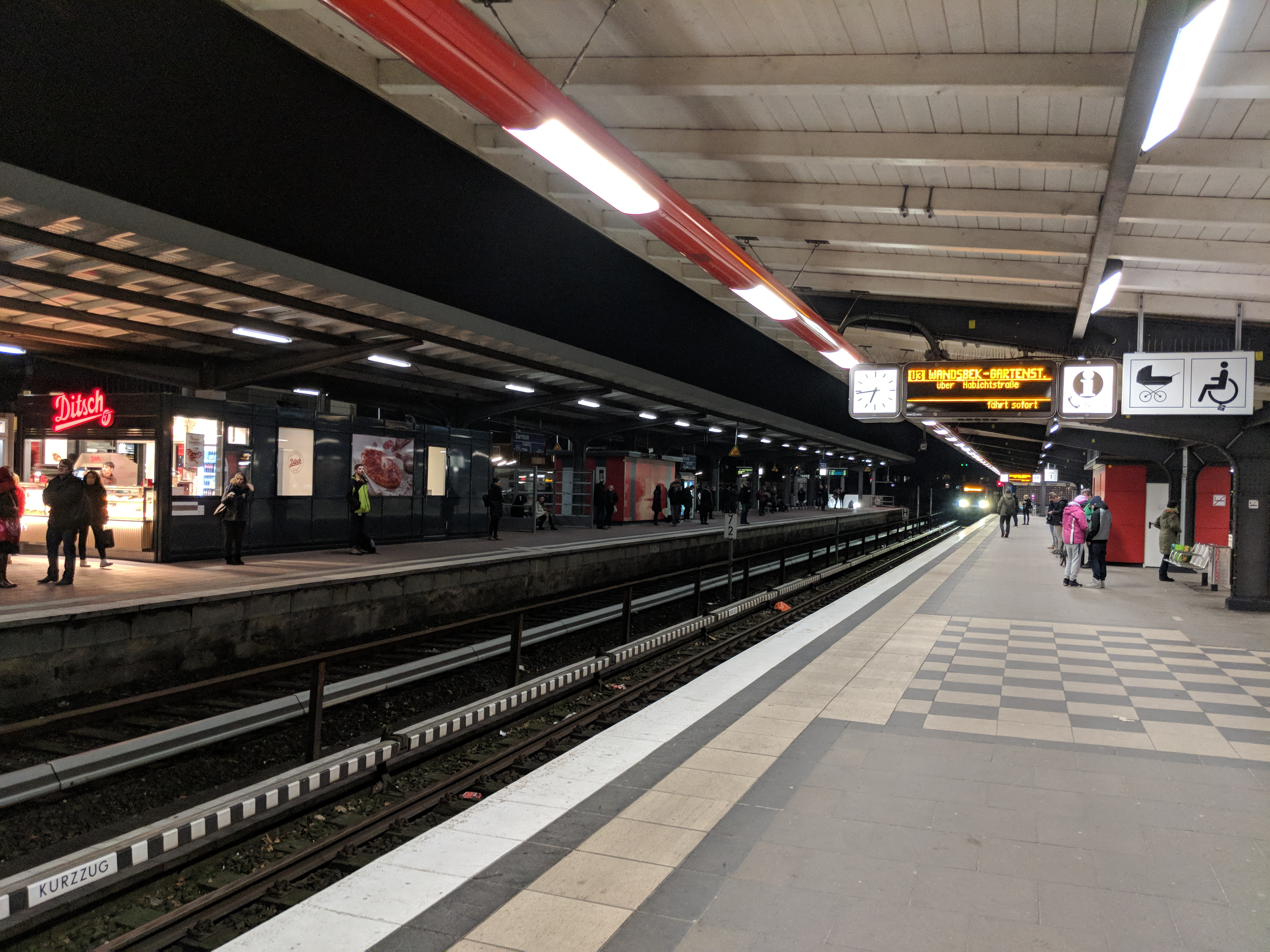
Barmbek station

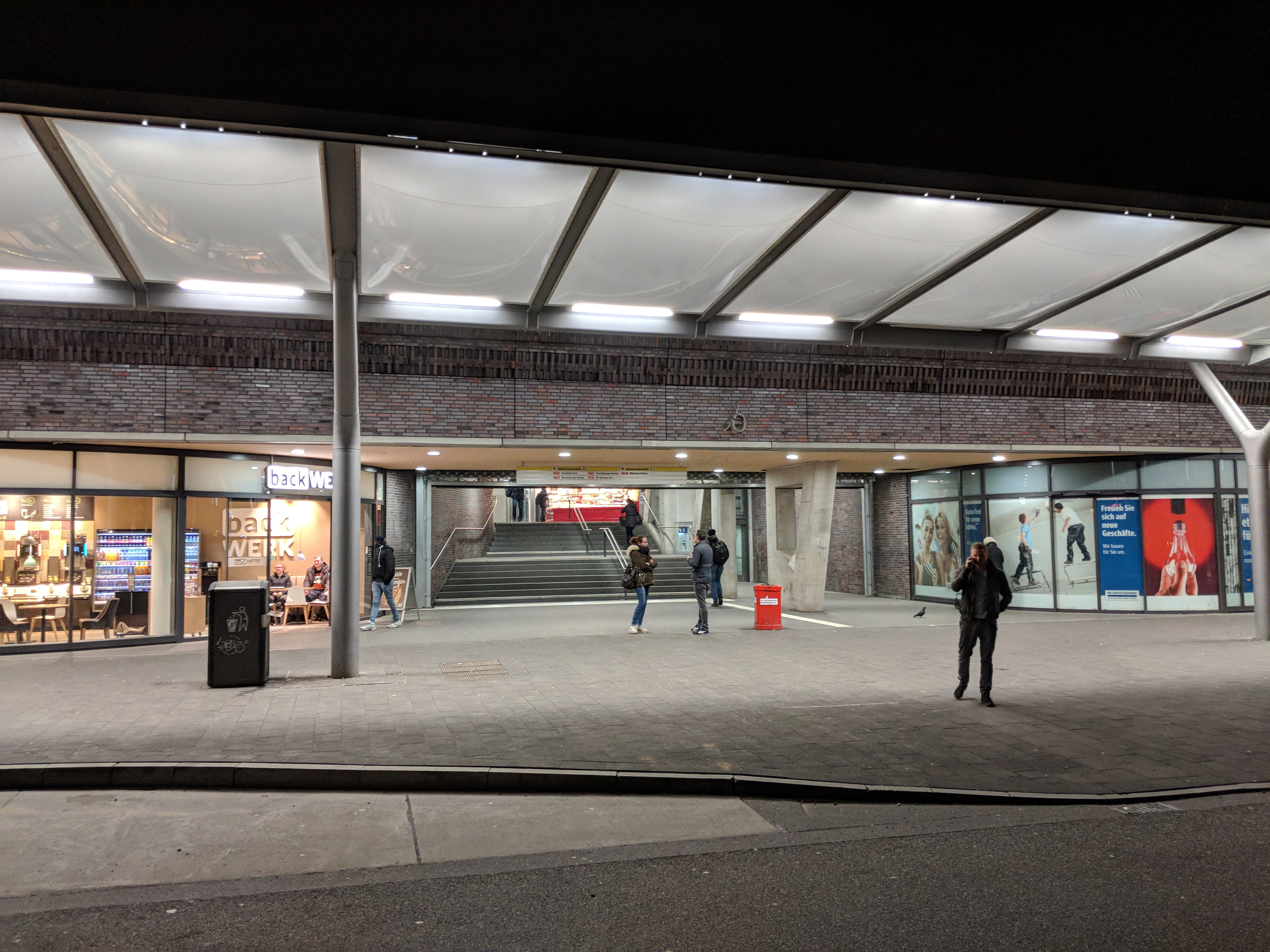
Entrance

== See also ==
- List of Hamburg U-Bahn stations
- List of Hamburg S-Bahn stations
