= Wandsbek-Gartenstadt station =

Rapid transit station in Hamburg, Germany

Wandsbek-Gartenstadt
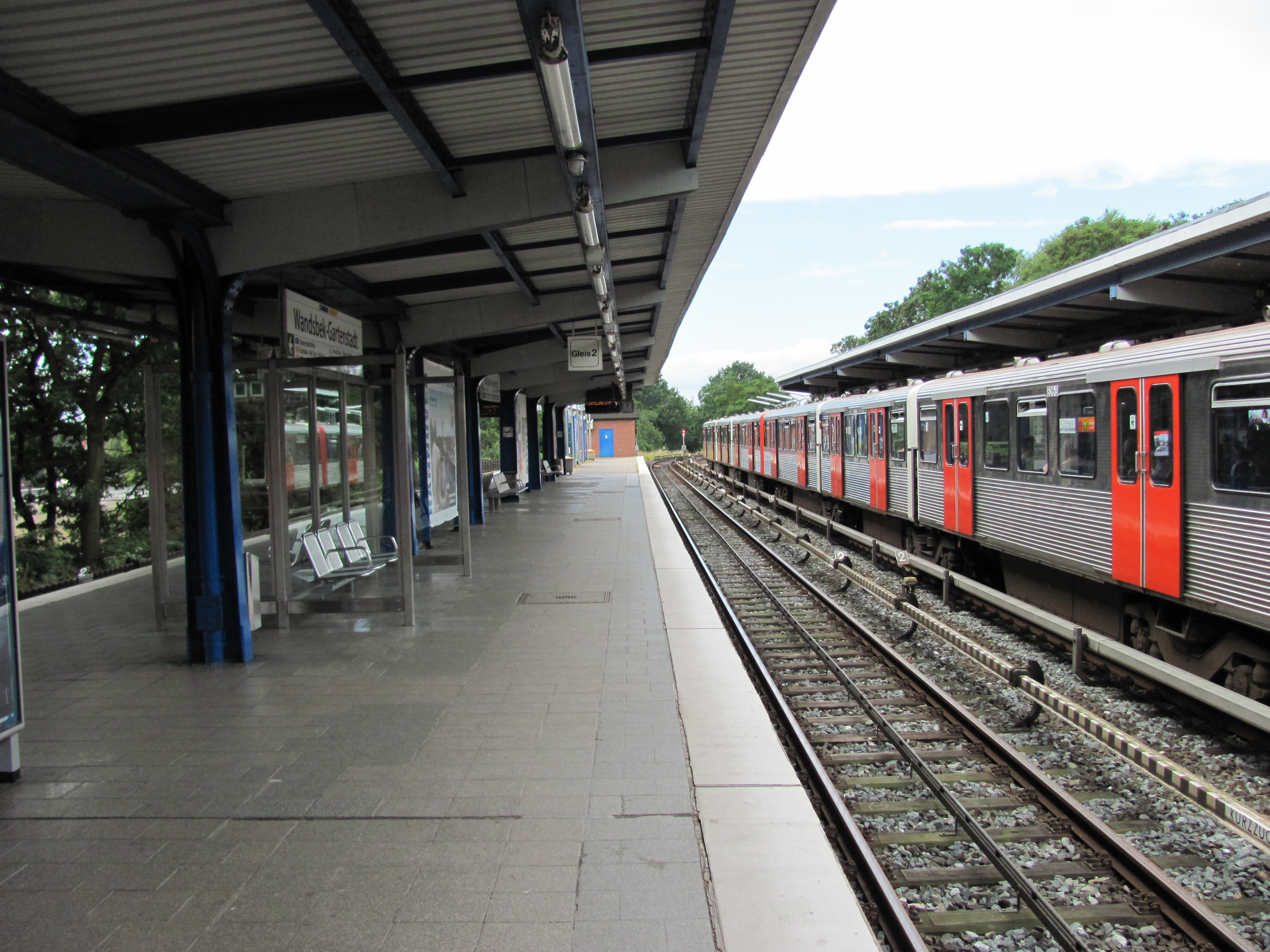

General information
- Location: Ostpreußenplatz; 22049 Hamburg, Germany
- Coordinates: 53°35′33″N 10°04′28″E
- System: Hamburg U-Bahn station
- Operator: Hamburger Hochbahn AG
- Line: U1 U3
- Platforms: 2 island platforms
- Tracks: 4
- Connections: Bus, Taxi

Construction
- Structure type: Elevated
- Cycle facilities: Bike and ride
- Accessible: Yes

Other information
- Station code: HHA: WK
- Fare zone: HVV: A/105, 204, and 205

History
- Opened: 12 September 1918; 107 years ago
- Electrified: 6 September 1920; 105 years ago
- Former names: 1918-1920 Hinschenfelde

Services
Preceding station	Hamburg U-Bahn	Following station
Alter Teichweg towards Norderstedt Mitte	U1	Trabrennbahn towards Großhansdorf or Ohlstedt
Habichtstraße towards Barmbek via Hauptbahnhof Süd	U3	Terminus
Location
- Location within Hamburg Location within Germany

Wandsbek-Gartenstadt is a major rapid transit station on the Hamburg U-Bahn lines U1 and U3. For line U1, Wandsbek-Gartenstadt is a through station; for line U3, it is terminus station. The station is located in the Gartenstadt (garden city) of Wandsbek, Germany. Wandsbek is center of the Hamburg borough of Wandsbek.

== History ==
The station was opened in 1918 by the name "Hinschenfelde" and as part of Hamburg's Walddörferbahn. In 1920 the station was electrified, renamed "Wandsbek-Gartenstadt" and integrated into the Hamburger Hochbahn network. On 4 August 1963 the second rail line was opened.

Since 2014, ongoing modernization works on the station building and the station platforms are underway, including raised platforms for handicap-accessibility and new platform roofs. Since May 2014, the northbound trains are accessible via an elevator, the southbound trains are expected to be equipped accordingly by the end of 2014.

== Layout ==
The station is located on the northern side of Ostpreußenplatz, a small square off Lesserstraße. The two elevated island platforms sit on a rail dam, with main access from a small station building on the southern side, and a pedestrian tunnel on the north side. The station allows for cross-platform interchange between the two lines.

== Service ==
=== Trains ===
Wandsbek-Gartenstadt U-Bahn station is served by Hamburg U-Bahn lines U1 and U3.

== Gallery ==
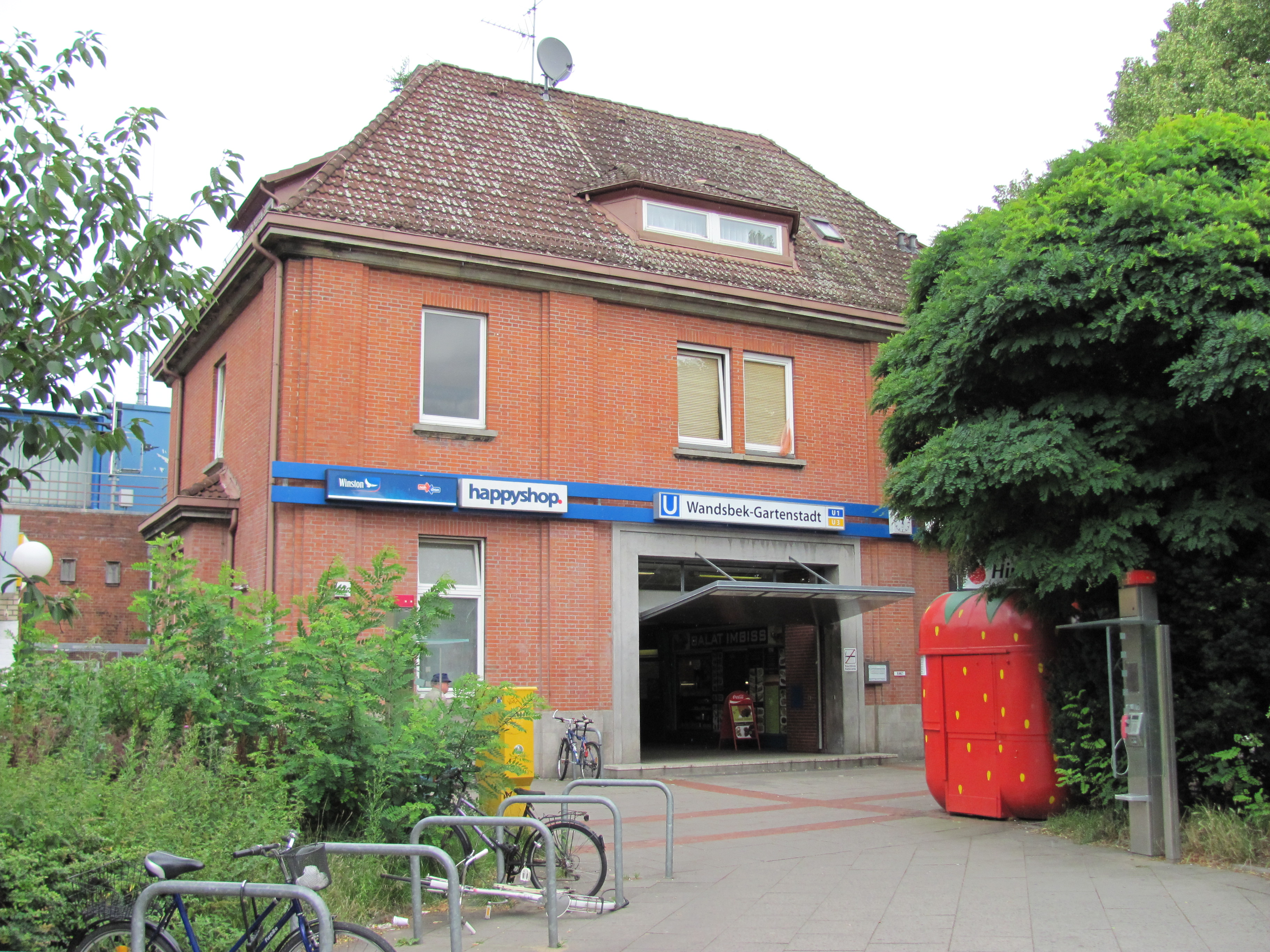
The station's entrance

== See also ==
- List of Hamburg U-Bahn stations
