= U3 (Hamburg U-Bahn) =

Rapid transit line

Coordinates: 53.5402°N 9.9932°E

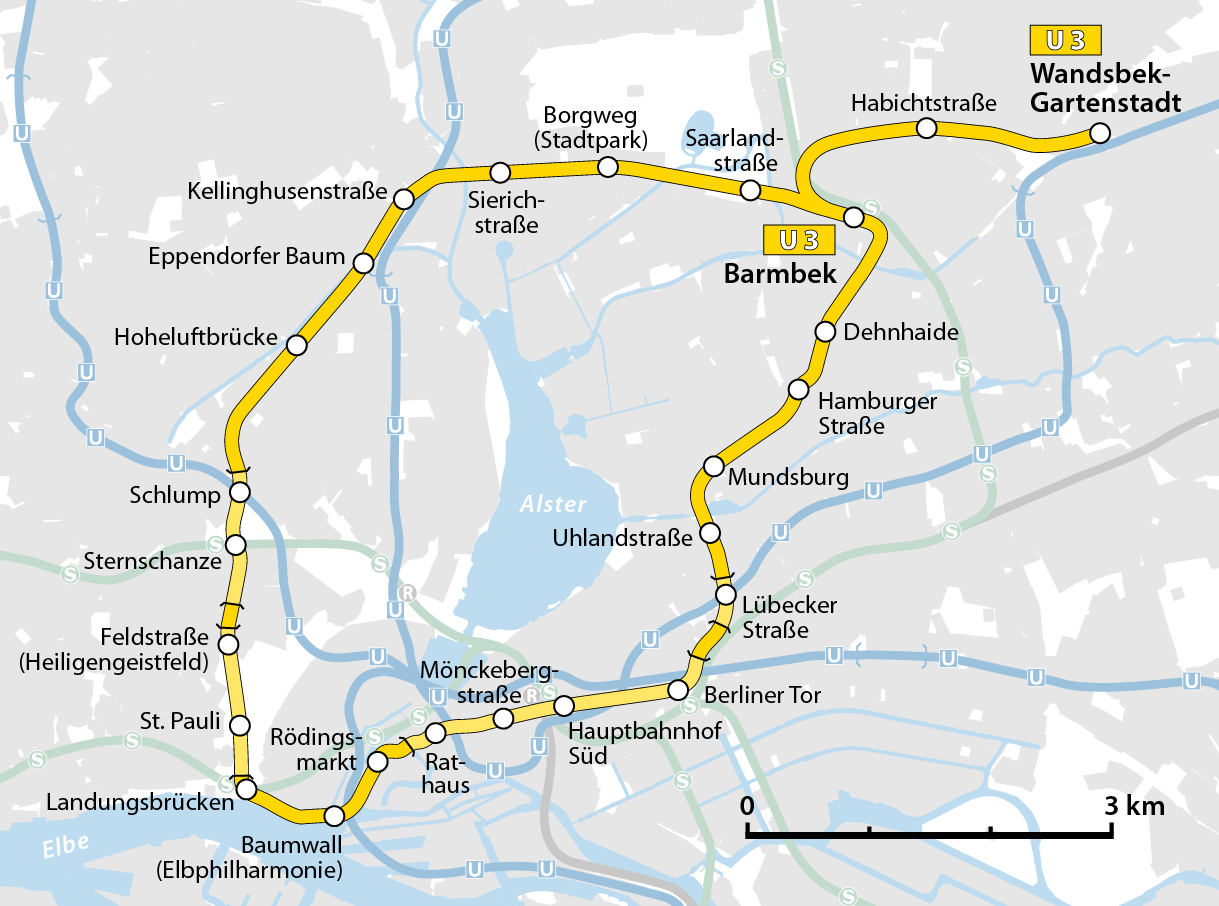

Overview
- Stations: 25

Service
- Type: Rapid transit
- System: Hamburg U-Bahn
- Operator: Hamburger Hochbahn

History
- Opened: February 15, 1912; 114 years ago

Technical
- Line length: 20.68 km (12.85 mi)
- Track gauge: 1,435 mm (4 ft 8 1/2 in)

The U3 is a line of the Hamburg U-Bahn. The ring line with a length of 20.68 kilometres (12.85 mi) serves 25 stations. The first part opened in 1912. The line starts in Wandsbek-Gartenstadt and leads via Barmbek into the ring passing through the city centre and back to Barmbek.

== History ==
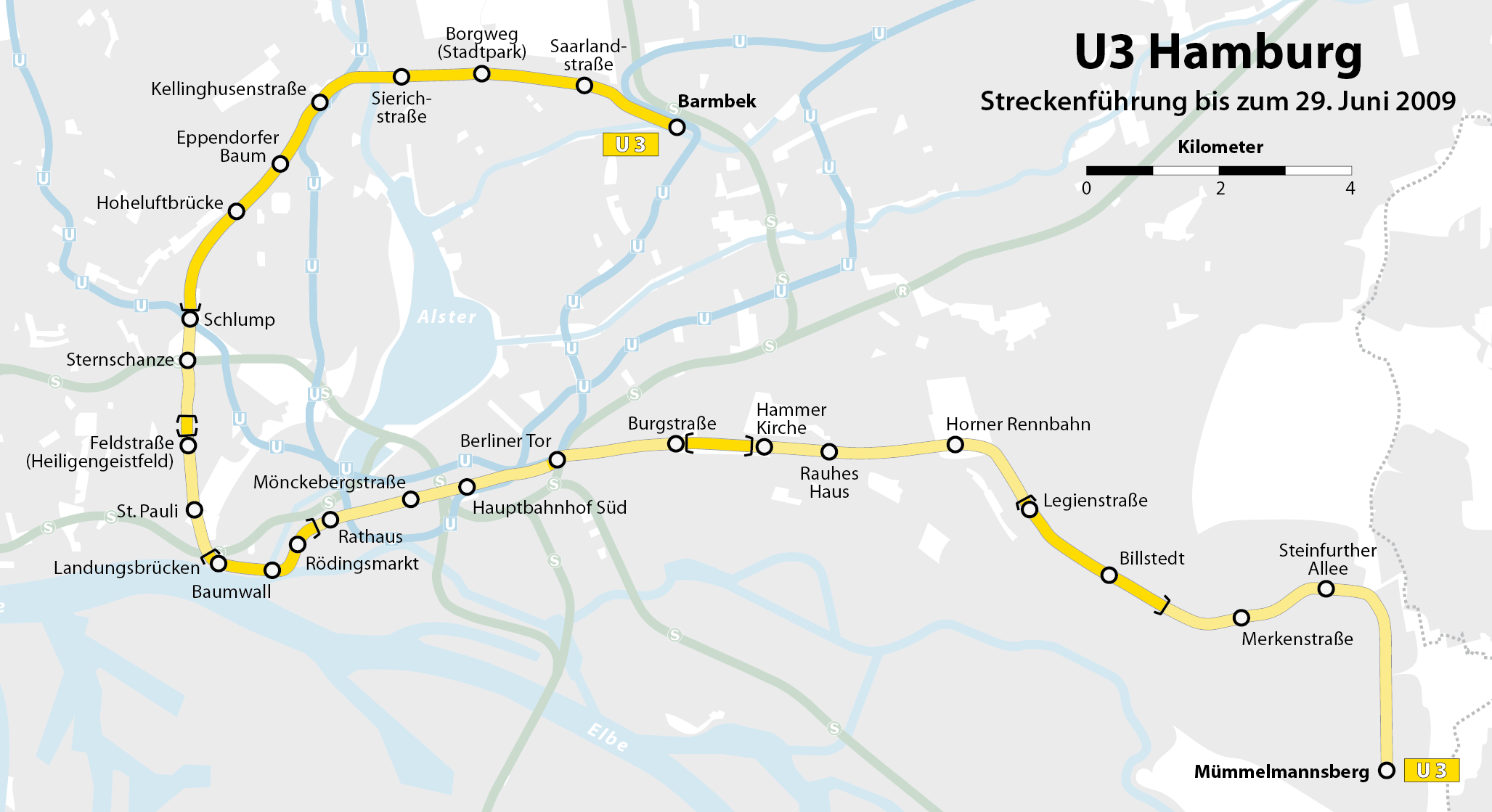
U3 before line swap in 2009

The ring line was built from 1906 to 1912 and had a length of 17.48 km (10.86 mi) and with 23 stations. The first part of the line which was first opened in February 1912, was the part between Rathaus via Hauptbahnhof and to Barmbek. On 2 January 1967, the first part of the line to Billstedt opened with the section leading to Horner Rennbahn. Since then, the U3 line was not a ring line anymore until the year of 2009.

In 2009, eastern parts of U2 and U3 lines were swapped behind Berliner Tor. Before that, the U2 line led to Wandsbek-Gartenstadt. Since then, it ends in Mümmelmannsberg, and the U3 became a ring line again with a branch to Wandsbek-Gartenstadt.

== Future ==
A new Fuhlsbüttler Straße station is planned between Barmbek and Habichtstraße stations, the construction of which would begin in 2027. It is expected to be completed in 2029.

== Gallery ==
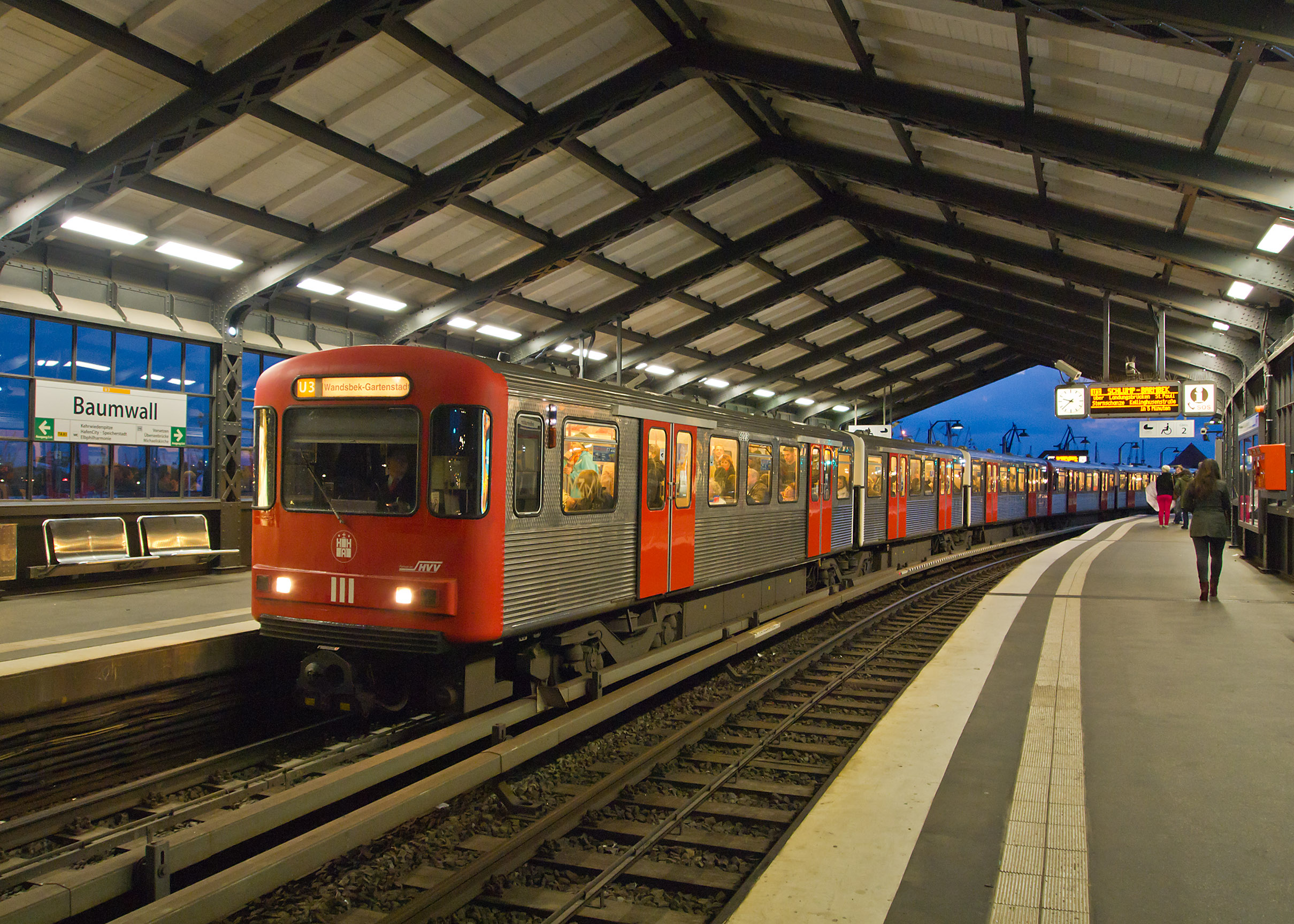
Baumwall

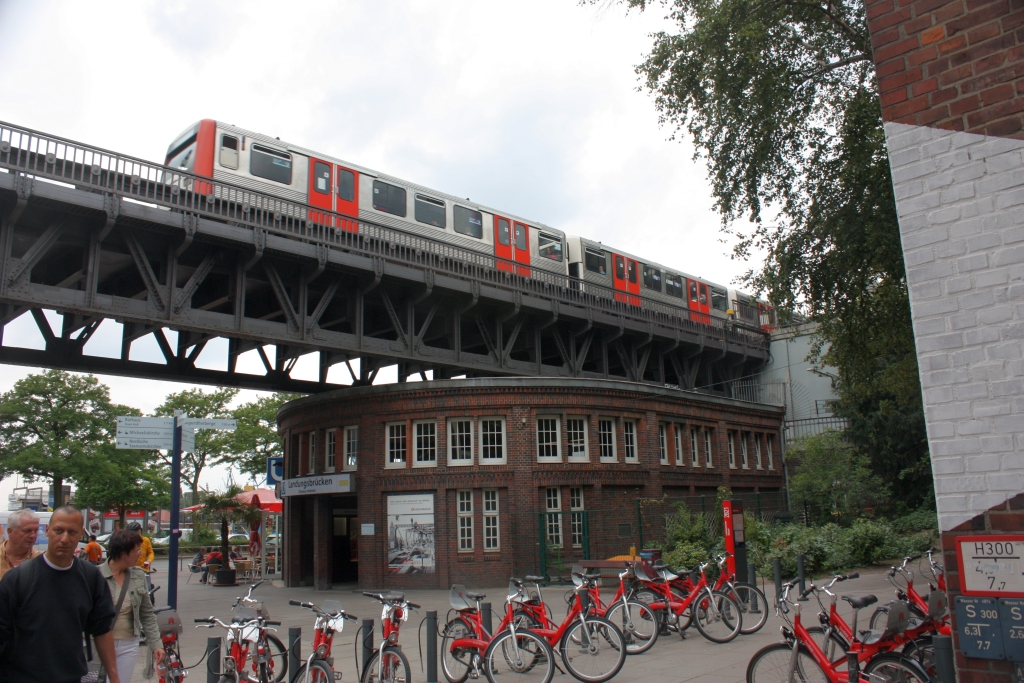
Landungsbrücken

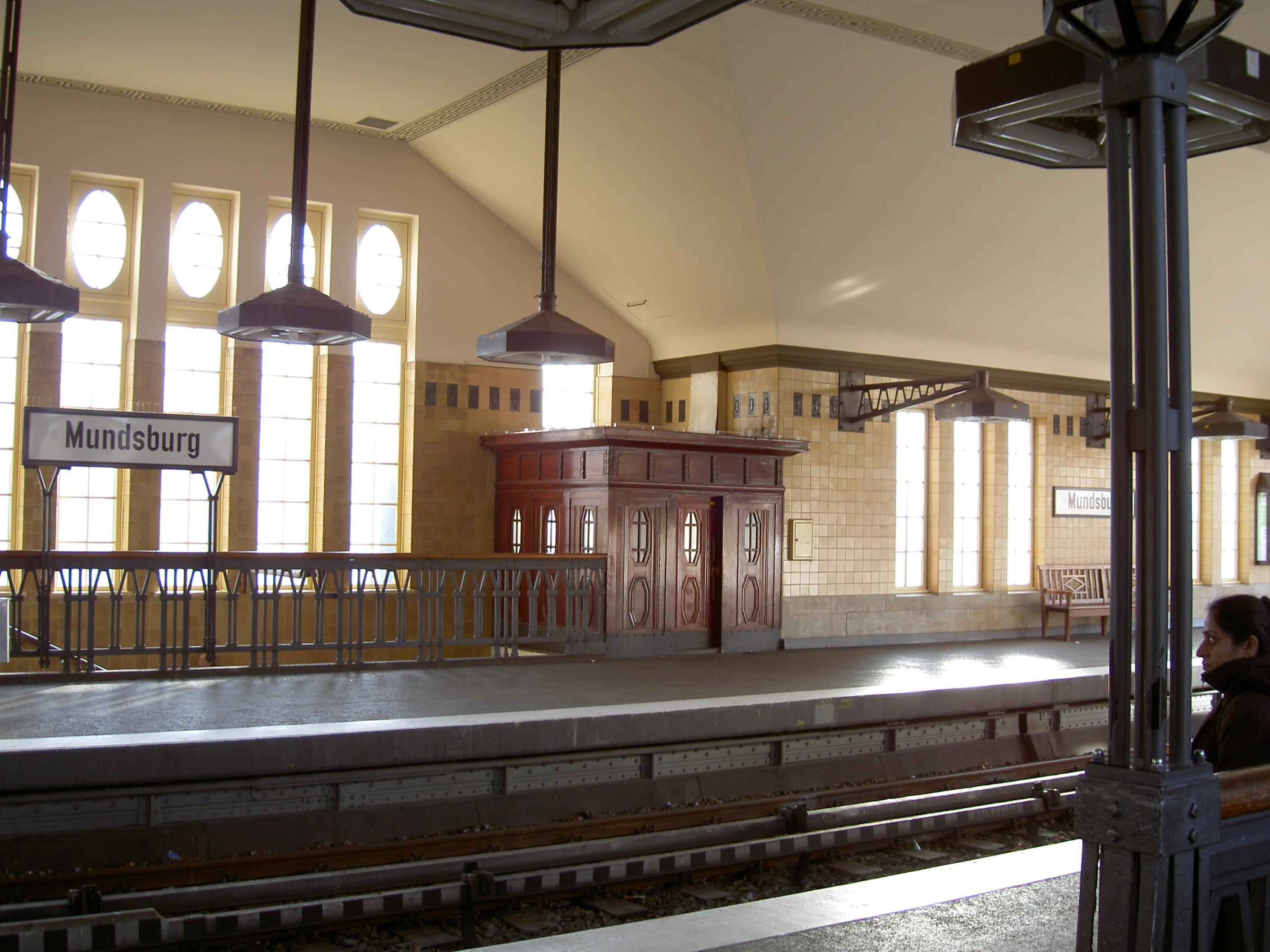
Mundsburg

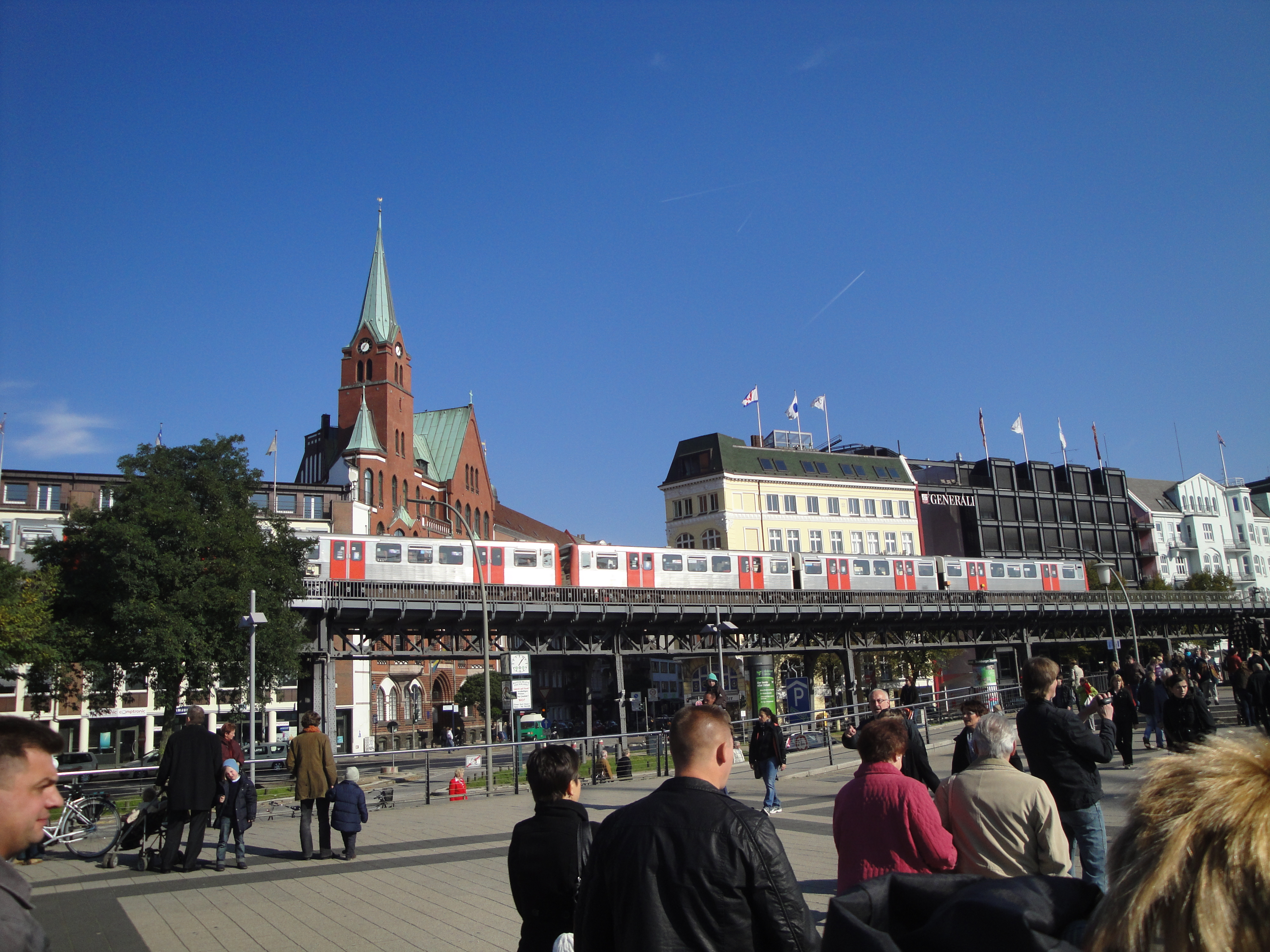
U3

== See also ==
- Tokyo's Toei Ōedo Line, London Underground's Circle line, and the Brussels Metro Line 6, three underground lines with similar arrangements
