= Hamburger Hochbahn =

Public company in Hamburg

Hamburger Hochbahn AG
- Company type: Public
- Industry: passenger transport urban and suburban passenger land transport
- Founded: 1911
- Founder: Siemens & Halske and AEG (Allgemeine Elektrizitäts-gesellschaft)
- Headquarters: Hamburg, Germany
- Area served: Hamburg Metropolitan Region
- Services: Public transport
- Owner: Free and Hanseatic City of Hamburg (100%)
- Number of employees: 4,800
- Website: http://www.hochbahn.de/

Hamburger Hochbahn AG (German pronunciation: [ˈhambʊʁɡɐ ˈhoːxbaːn]; HHA), founded in 1911, operates the underground system and large parts of the bus system in Hamburg, Germany. Its name comes from the initial name given to the Hamburg metro system, Hochbahn (German: elevated railway).

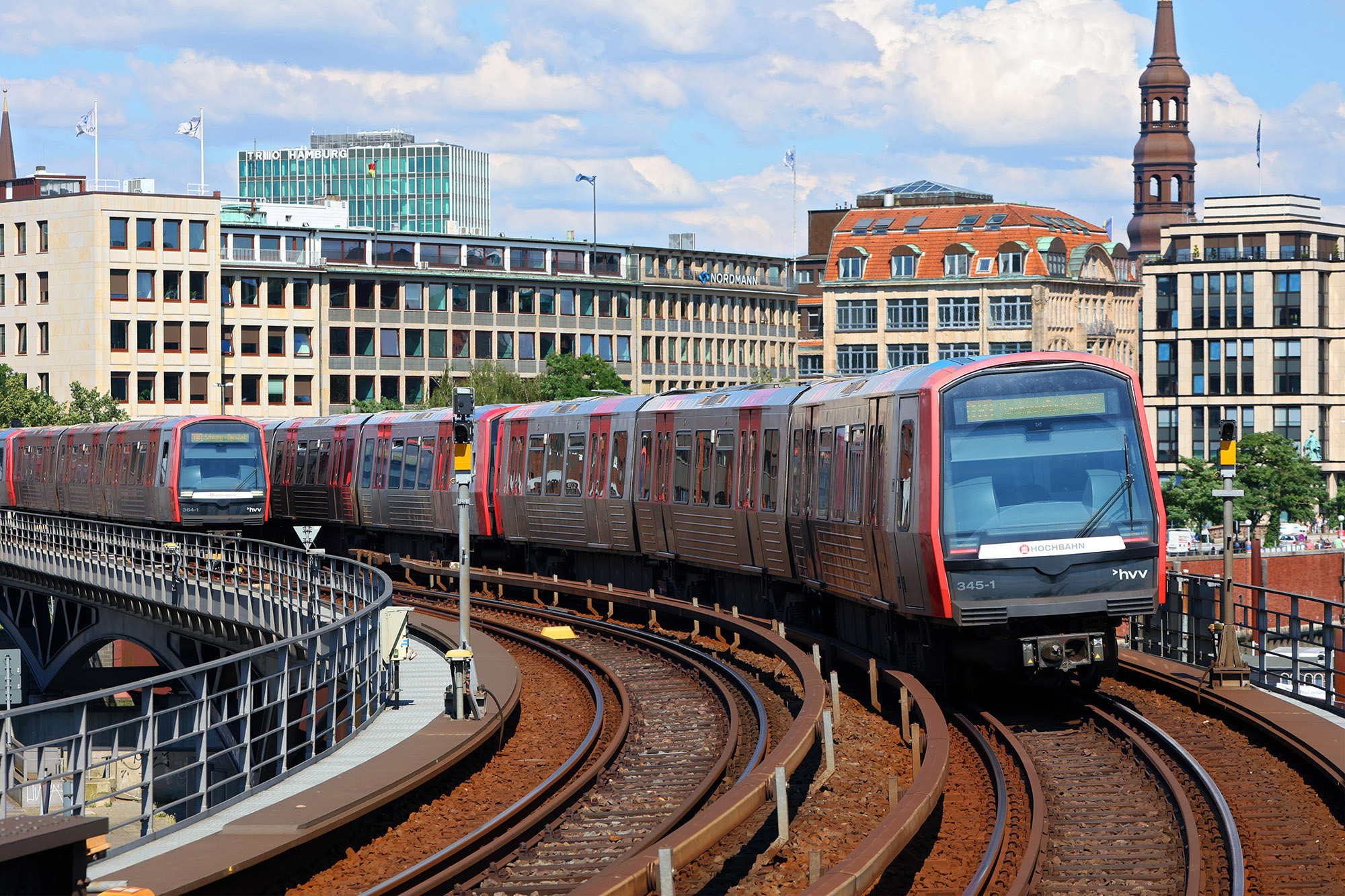
Hochbahn Hamburg

== History ==
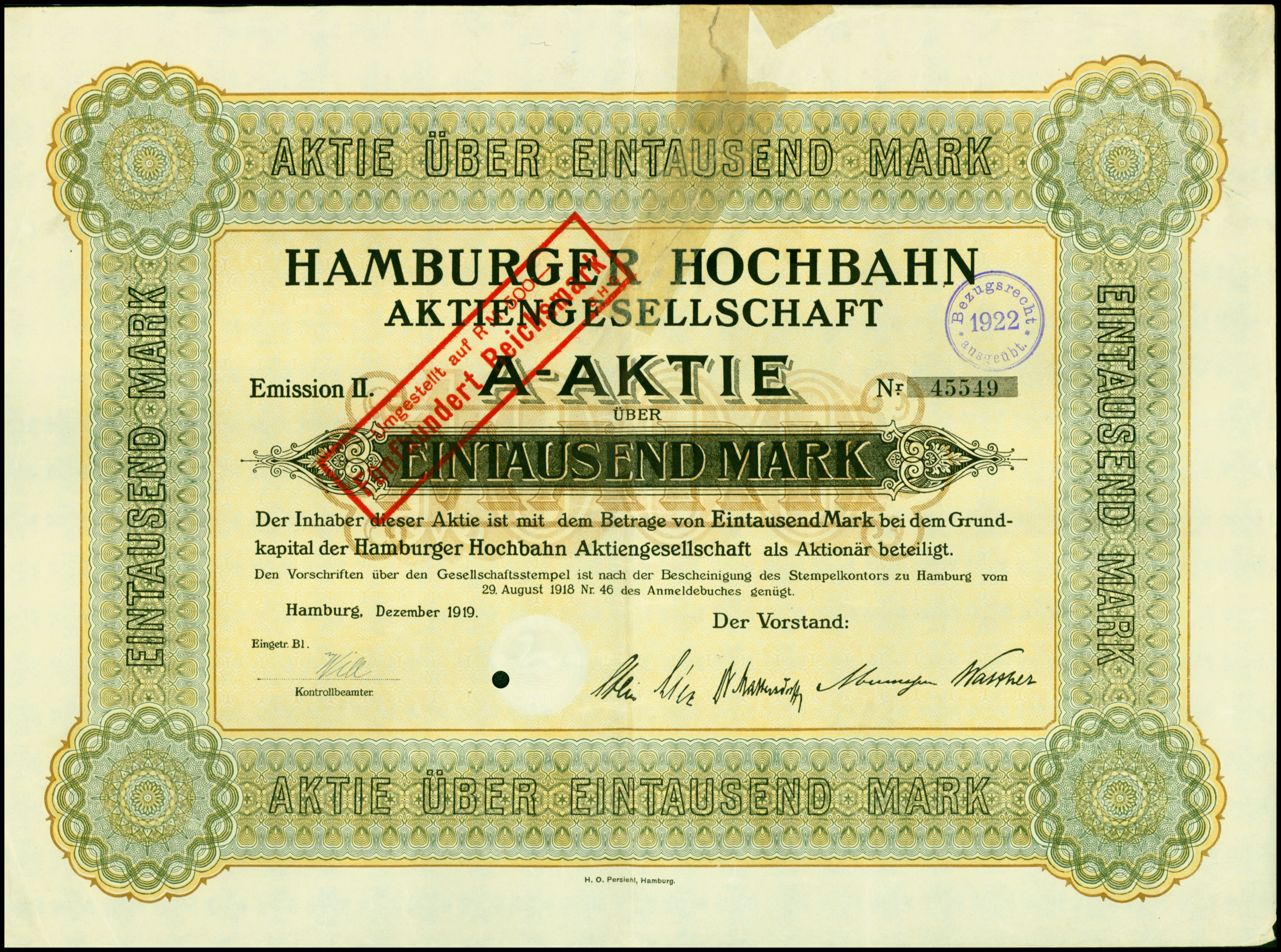
Share of the Hamburger Hochbahn AG, issued December 1919

The HHA was founded by Siemens & Halske and AEG as a consortium on 27 May 1911. The first chairman was Albert Ballin.

From 1919 until 1978, the HHA operated a large tram network, and from 5 December 1921 the HHA also operated the first motor buses in Hamburg. After the acquisition of the Straßen-Eisenbahn-Gesellschaft (SEG) in 1919 and the Hamburg-Altonaer-Centralbahngesellschaft AG in 1923, the HHA had a rolling stock of 865 power cars and 930 trailers by 1928. The length of tracks was 217.33 km. In 1970 the length of the lines were only 82.7 km, in 1978 they were 89.5 km with 80 stations.

In 1965, HHA was one of the founding members of the Hamburger Verkehrsverbund (HVV).

== Operations ==
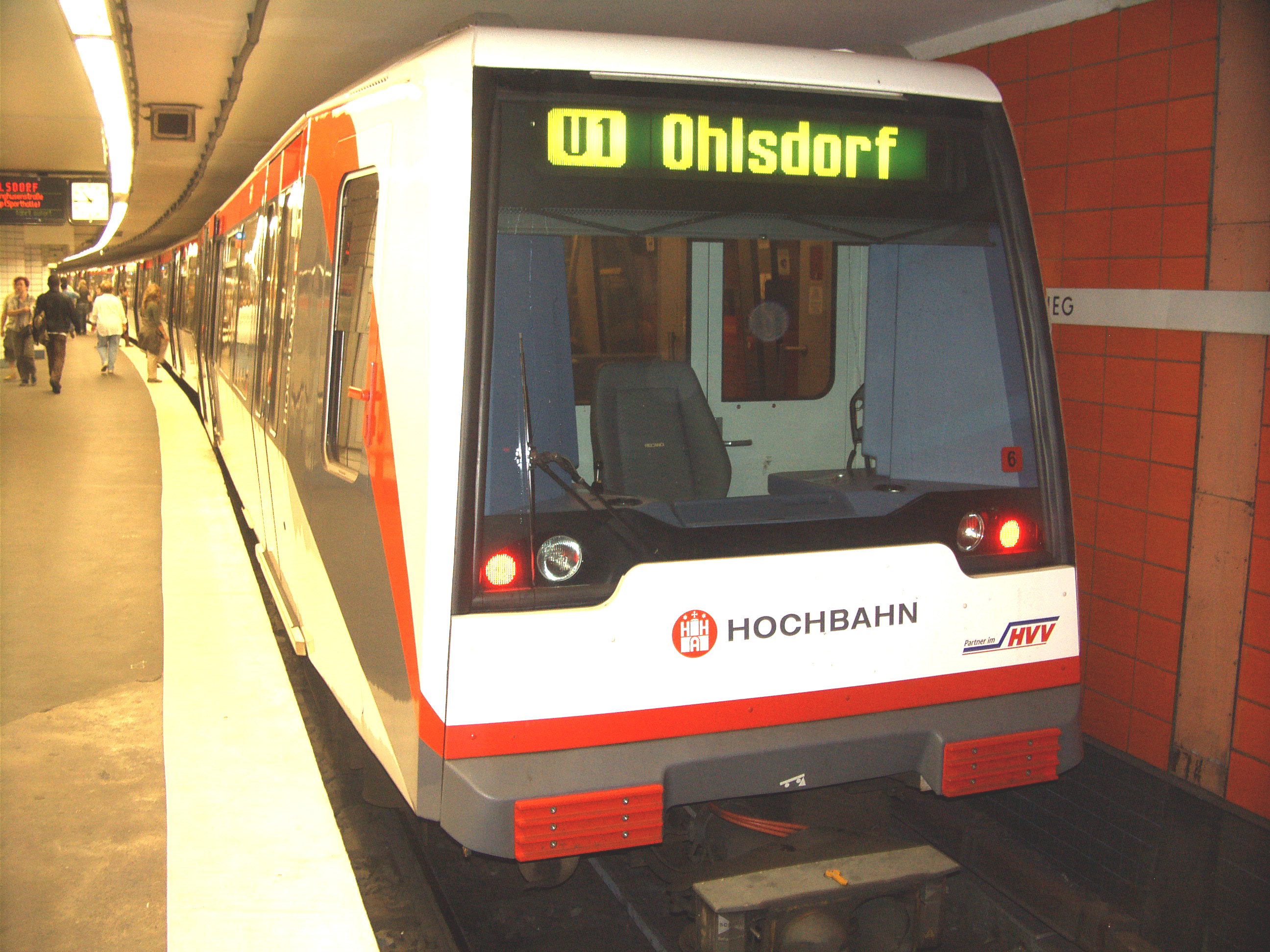
U-Bahn type DT4 at Jungfernstieg station

HHA operates about 111 bus routes and four underground lines. In spite of the "U" for "underground", large portions, especially outside the inner city, run on the surface. Some parts of the underground, notably along the banks of River Elbe in the city centre, are elevated (hence the name "Hochbahn", "elevated railway").

=== Former Subsidiaries ===
BeNEX GmbH was HHA's holding company for public transport corporations outside of Hamburg. The UK listed investment firm International Public Partnerships Limited (then known as Babcock & Brown Public Partnerships) acquired 49% of BeNEX in 2007, and the remaining 51% in 2019.

Through BeNEX HHA owed 25.1% of the Metronom Eisenbahngesellschaft, a company operating commuter trains in northern Germany. Nordbahn Eisenbahngesellschaft, with Neumünster - Bad Segeberg - Bad Oldesloe railway in Schleswig-Holstein, was owned in joint venture with the AKN railway. Among others there were also the East German Railway plc (German: Ostdeutsche Eisenbahn; 50% ownership) and the Cantus Verkehrsgesellschaft, both joint ventures with other corporations.

== Notes ==
- The information in this article is based on its German equivalent
