= Hamburg U-Bahn =

Rapid transit system in Hamburg, Germany

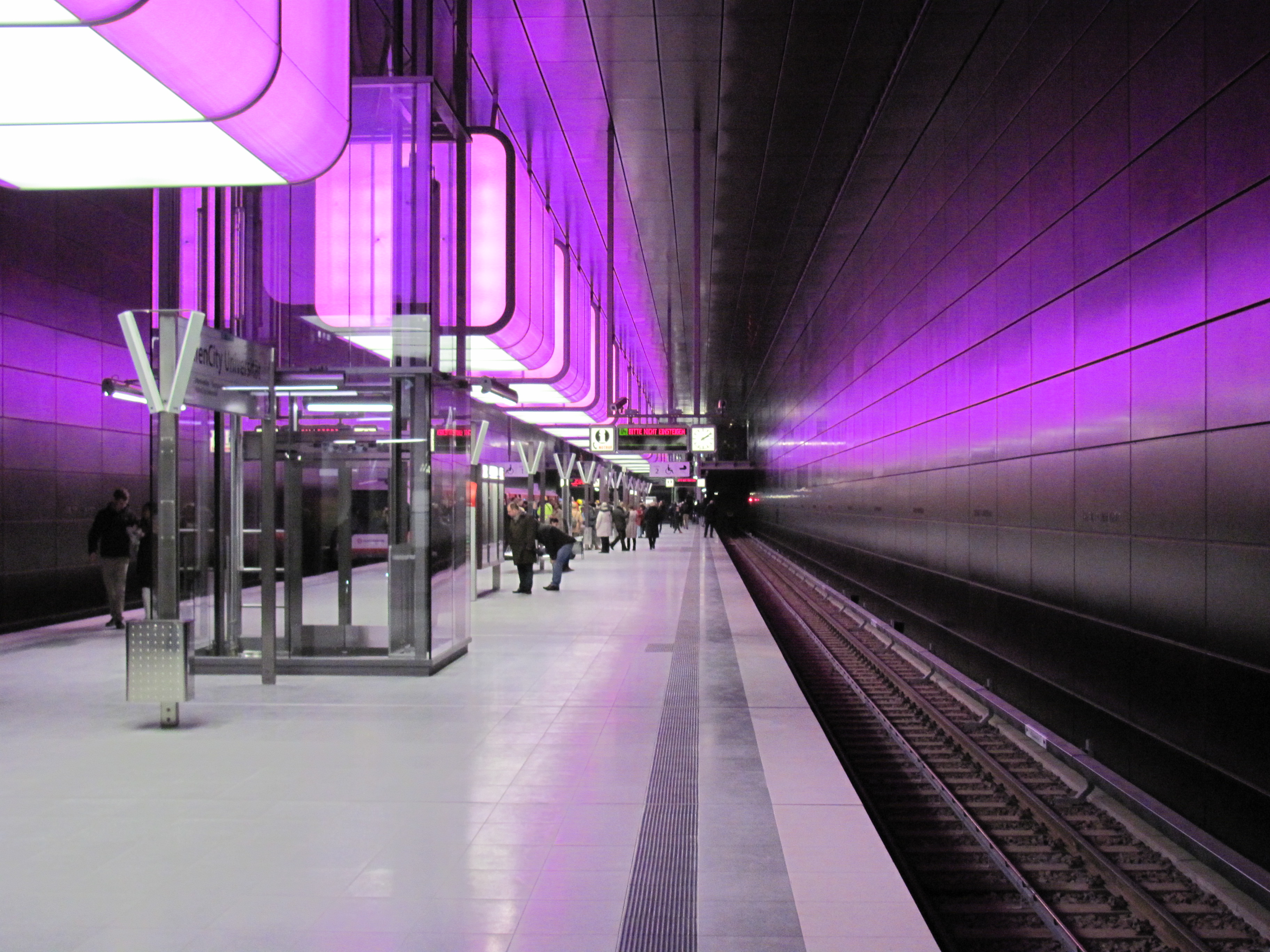
- HafenCity Universität Station of Hamburg U-Bahn

Overview
- Owner: Hamburger Hochbahn AG, Verkehrsgesellschaft Norderstedt
- Locale: Hamburg, Norderstedt, Ahrensburg, Großhansdorf
- Transit type: Rapid transit
- Number of lines: 4
- Number of stations: 93
- Daily ridership: 664,380 (2017)
- Annual ridership: 242.5 million (2017)
- Website: www.hochbahn.de

Operation
- Began operation: 15 February 1912; 114 years ago
- Operator: Hamburger Hochbahn AG
- Number of vehicles: 245 trains (Note: Number of vehicles without maintenance trains.); 861 cars
- Train length: ~120 metres (390 ft)
- Headway: 5 minutes (rush hour 3 min)

Technical
- System length: 106.4 km (66.1 mi)
- Track gauge: 1,435 mm (4 ft 8 1/2 in) (standard gauge)
- Electrification: 750 V DC Third rail
- Top speed: 80 km/h (50 mph)

The Hamburg U-Bahn is a rapid transit system serving the cities of Hamburg, Norderstedt, and Ahrensburg in Germany. Although referred to by the term U-Bahn (the "U" commonly being understood as standing for Untergrund "underground"), most of the system's track length is above ground. Many of the system's stations offer passenger interchanges with the city's S-Bahn system, which also has underground sections. It is operated by Hamburger Hochbahn within the Hamburger Verkehrsverbund (HVV). It was opened in February 1912, and comprises four lines serving 93 stations, with a route length of 106.4 kilometres (66.1 mi) in 2019.

== History ==
In 1906 the Senate of Hamburg awarded a contract for the Elevated and Underground Railway to Siemens & Halske and AEG of Berlin. The first stretch was completed on 7 October 1906. This was followed in 1911 with the founding of the Hamburger Hochbahn Aktiengesellschaft (HHA). Thus Hamburg became the third German city (after Berlin, 1902 and Schöneberg, 1910) to have a U-Bahn (then known as the Elevated and Underground Railway (Hoch- und Untergrundbahn) as it is largely either elevated or in tunnels – not much at street level).

The construction of such a railway had long been discussed, meanwhile an elevated train was also considered. In 1906 a circular route was begun, connecting Hamburg Hauptbahnhof – Berliner Tor – Barmbek (earlier spelling: Barmbeck) – Kellinghusenstraße – Schlump – Landungsbrücken (earlier designation: Hafentor) – Rathaus – Hauptbahnhof with branches to the quarters of Eimsbüttel, Ohlsdorf and Rothenburgsort. On 15 February 1912 the first stretch of the future Ringbahn (Circle railway) between Rathaus station and Barmbek was inaugurated. The stretch included both underground and elevated sections.

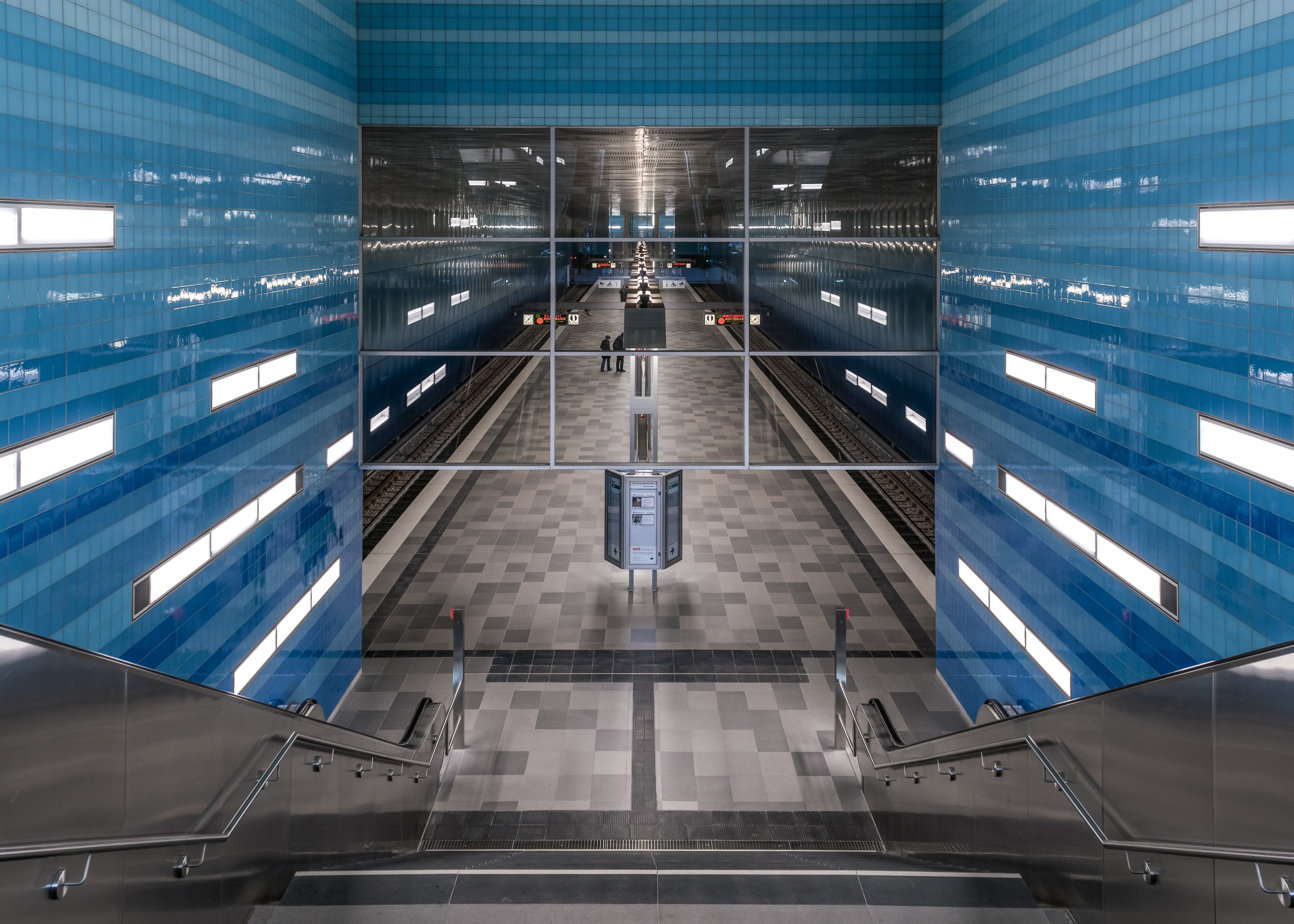
Übersee-
quartier station

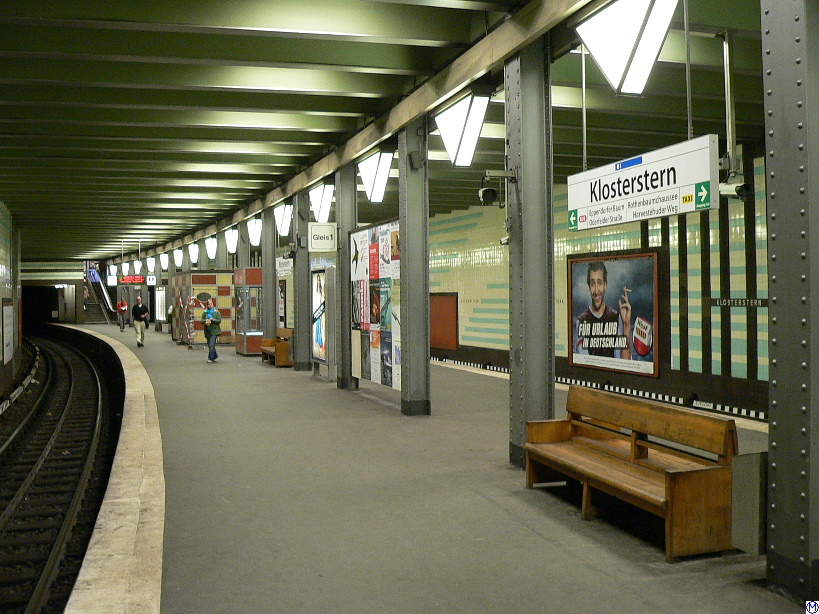
Klosterstern station

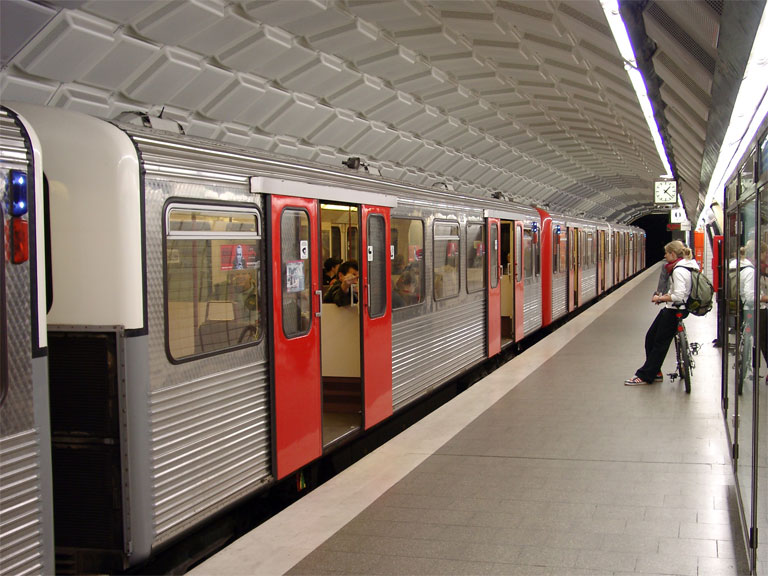
Hauptbahnhof Nord station

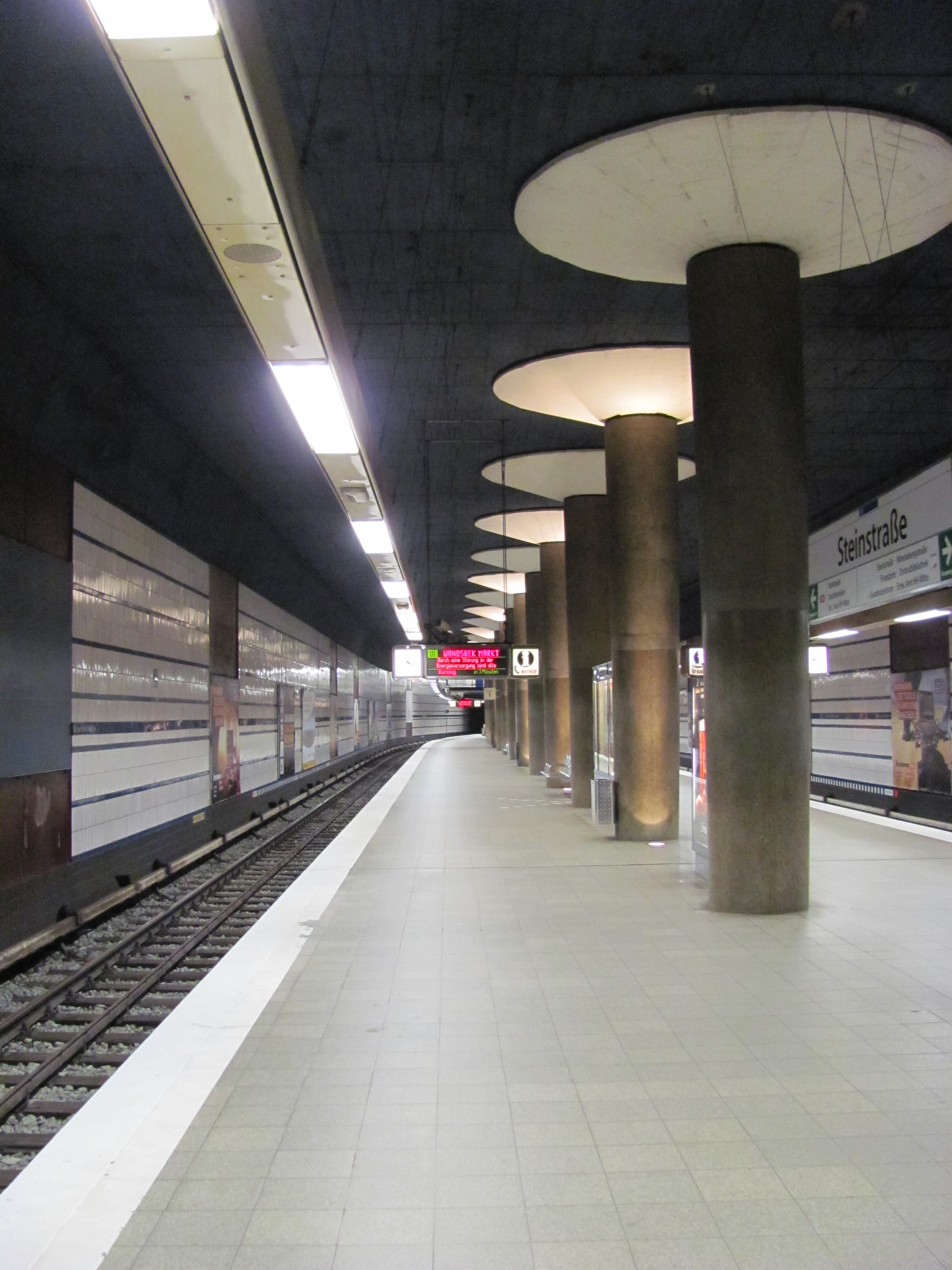
Steinstraße station

=== Network development ===
By 1915 the Ringbahn and the three spurs, from Kellinghusenstraße to Ohlsdorf, from Schlump to Hellkamp (today: disused station between Oster- and Lutterothstraße) and from central station to Rothenburgsort were completed. By 1934 the extensions from Ohlsdorf to Ochsenzoll (Langenhorner Bahn), from Kellinghusenstraße to Jungfernstieg (KellJung line), and the Walddörferbahn (Forestvillages line) from Barmbek to Großhansdorf and Ohlstedt were completed.

In 1943, during the Second World War, the subway was badly damaged during 'Operation Gomorrha,' the RAF bombing of Hamburg that summer. The stretch from Hauptbahnhof to Rothenburgsort was not repaired because the district it passed through had been completely destroyed. It was five more years before the remaining network was once more completely intact.

Further additions to the network were made, starting in 1960. The KellJung line was extended via Meßberg to the central station (Hauptbahnhof). Later in 1962 the extension reached Wandsbek Markt and in 1963 Wandsbek-Gartenstadt. The total network length was 67.9 kilometres (42 mi).

The construction of a Durchmesserstrecke (diameter route) began in 1963. The plan was to connect Billstedt with Stellingen. The Eimsbüttel branch formed the western part of the line. The branch was extended up to Hagenbecks Tierpark in 1966. The existing terminus at Hellkamp was withdrawn from service in 1964 and a new station was built at Lutterothstraße further northwest.

The connection between Berliner Tor and Horner Rennbahn was opened in 1967. In the same year this eastern branch was extended to Legienstraße. Further extensions took place in 1969 to Billstedt and in 1970 towards Merkenstraße. The extension Ochsenzoll – Garstedt came into service in May 1969. Thus, the network total length reached 88.5 km (55 mi).

A new core stretch of the line U2, between Schlump and Berliner Tor, became a direct connection through the city centre. Next to be brought into service were sections from Hauptbahnhof Nord to Berliner Tor in 1968, and from Schlump (low) to Gänsemarkt in 1970, then the last section, with two new platforms on the lowest level at the station Jungfernstieg under the Binnenalster, in 1973. This station, as well as Hauptbahnhof Nord, was developed as part of the U4 line that was planned at that time.

In 1985 the section to Hagenbecks Tierpark was extended to Niendorf Markt and again in 1991 as far as Niendorf Nord. In 1990 the extension Merkenstraße – Mümmelmannsberg was opened. The line extension opened in 1996 between Garstedt and Norderstedt Mitte, which replaced the southern part of the Alsternordbahn.

In 2005 the Hamburg U-Bahn had a length of some 100.7 kilometres (63 mi), of which 40 km (25 mi) are underground. It had 89 station stops.

In 2009, the U3, beginning in Barmbek, traversed the complete ring line, thereby taking over the stretch between Berliner Tor and Barmbek, which was formerly served by the U2. In order to realise a problem-free service, a redesign of the current track layout to the west of Berliner Tor was necessary. An originally planned grade separated crossing of the two lines was realised, which was left undone before due to cost. Trains coming from the city centre leave the ring at Barmbek and continue via the viaduct stretch to Wandsbek Gartenstadt. One branch leads via the Walddörferbahn to Wandsbek-Gartenstadt, a stretch formerly served by the U2.

In 2012, the U4 started operations between Billstedt and HafenCity University, sharing most of its route with the U2 and thereby increasing service on the highly used line between Berliner Tor and Billstedt. The U4 was extended further east to Elbbrücken in December 2018, providing a future S-Bahn connection.

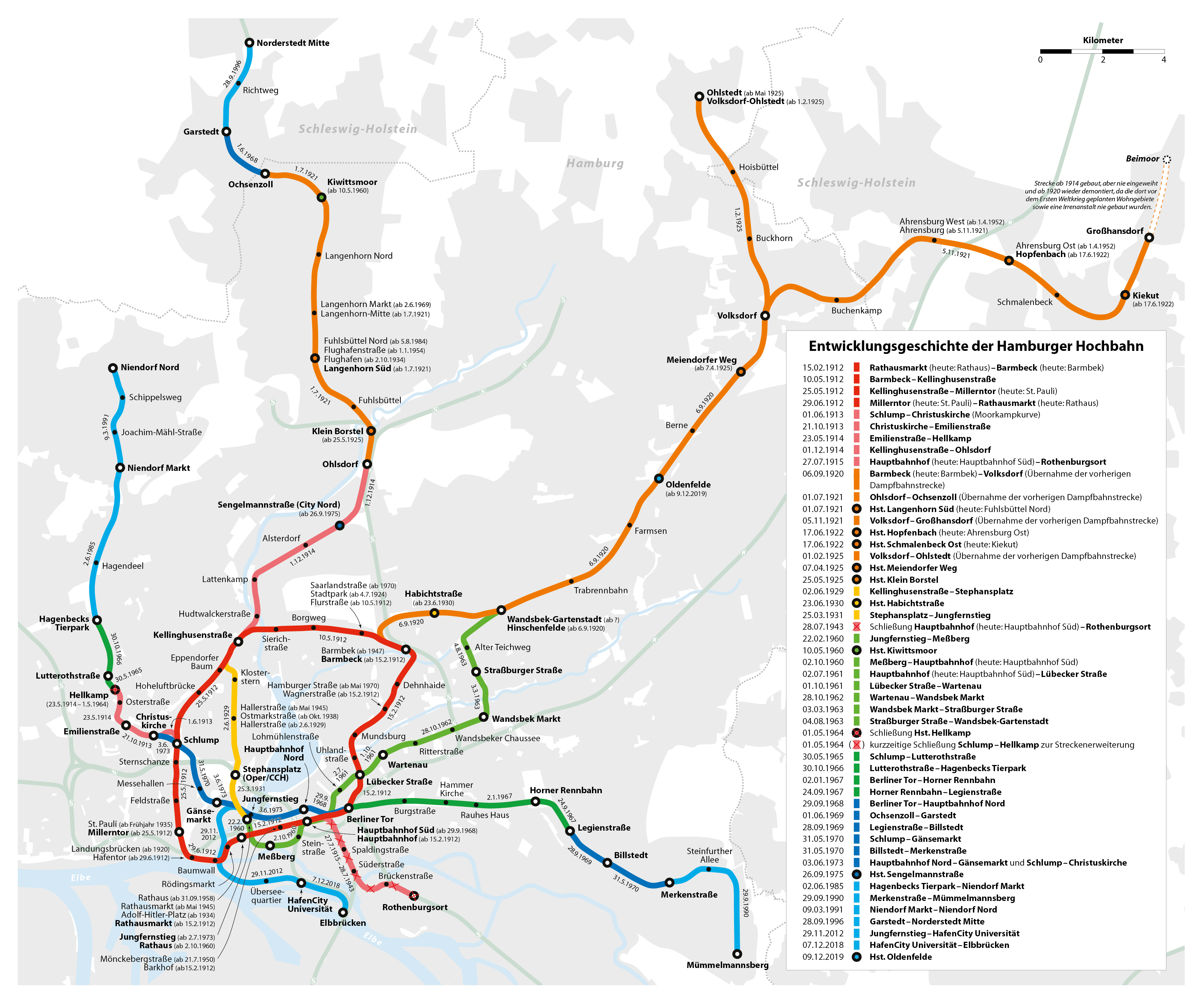
Map showing the network development

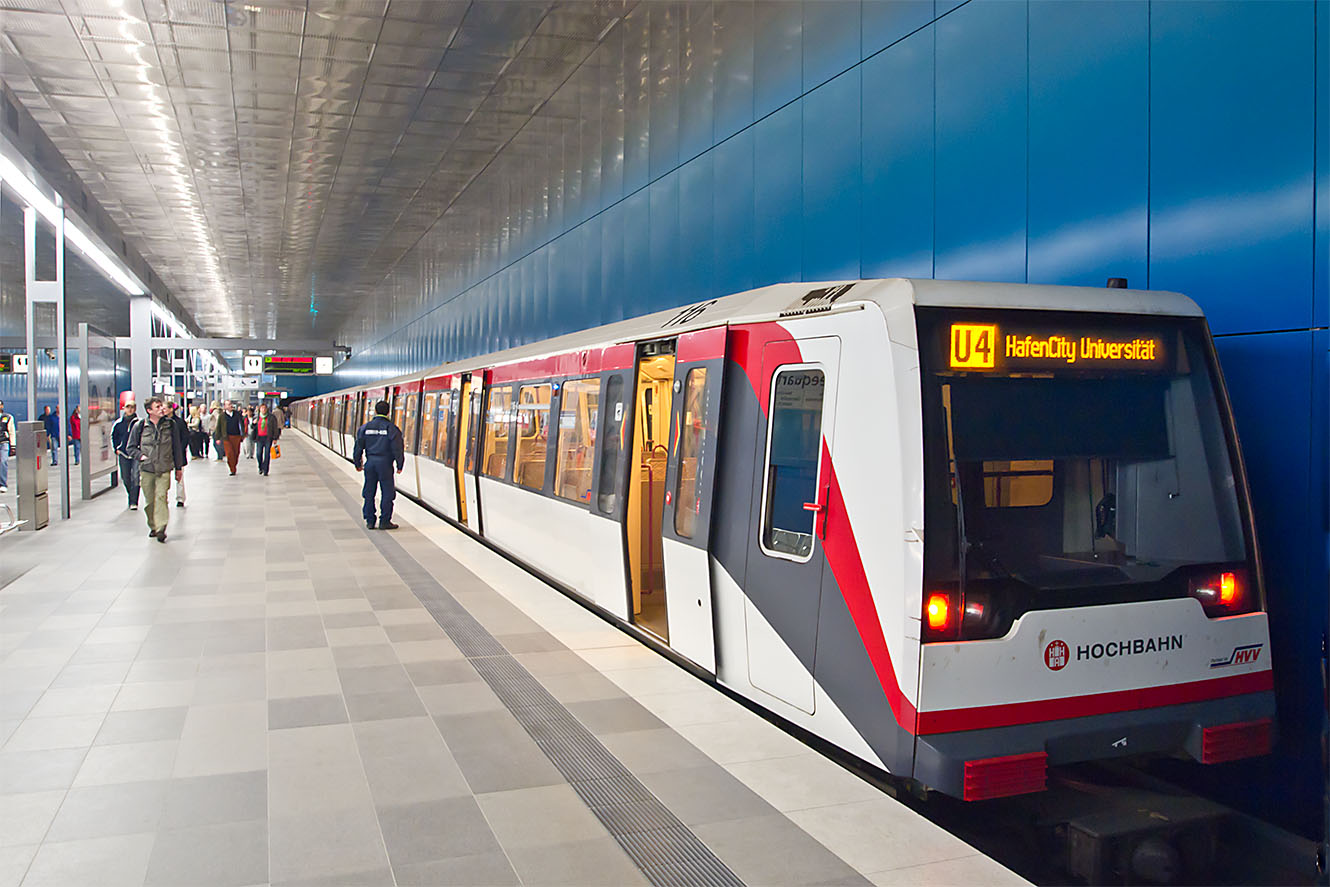
U-Bahn ″Überseequartier″, rolling stock type DT4

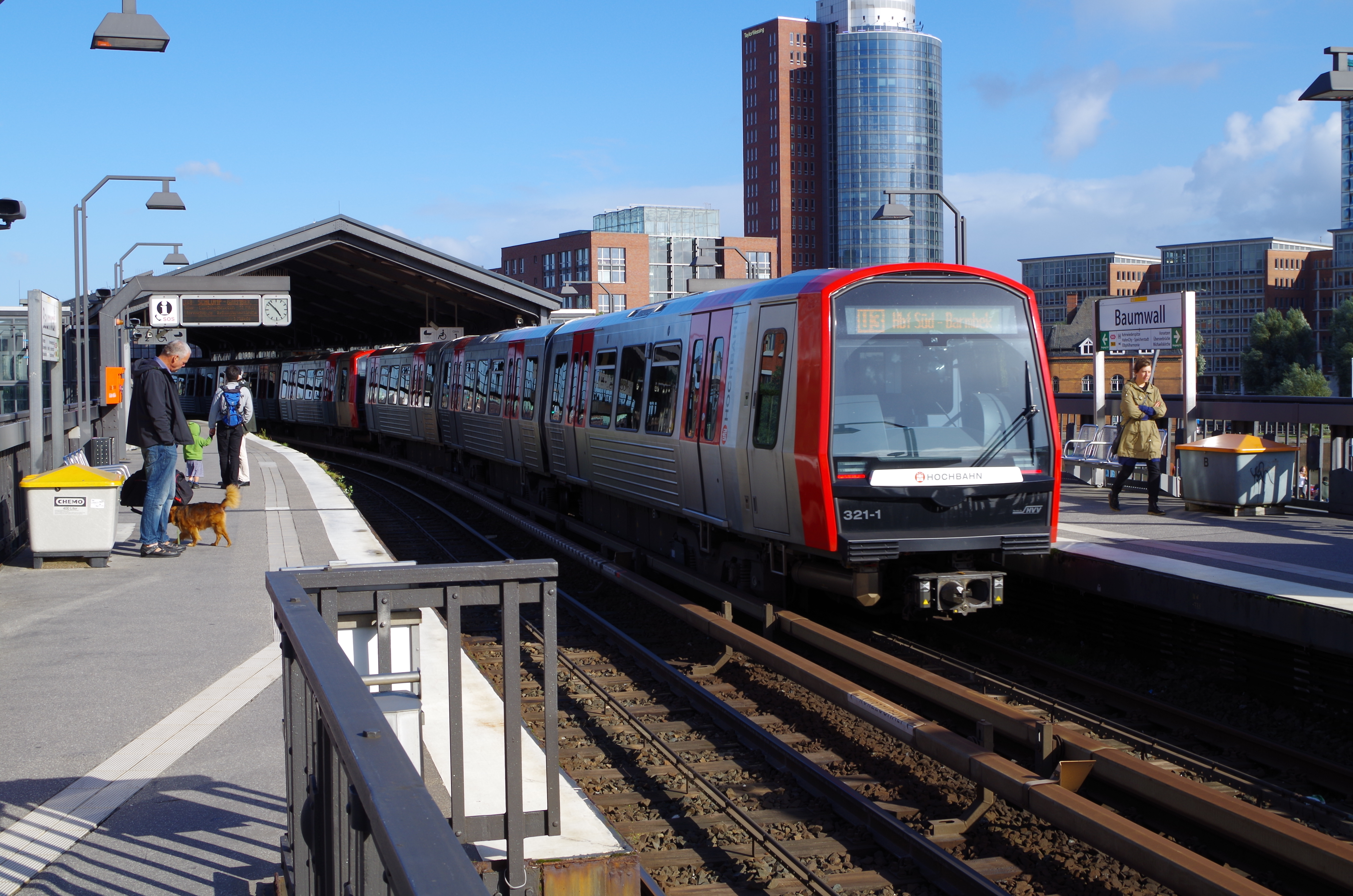
U-Bahn station ″Baumwall″, rolling stock type DT5

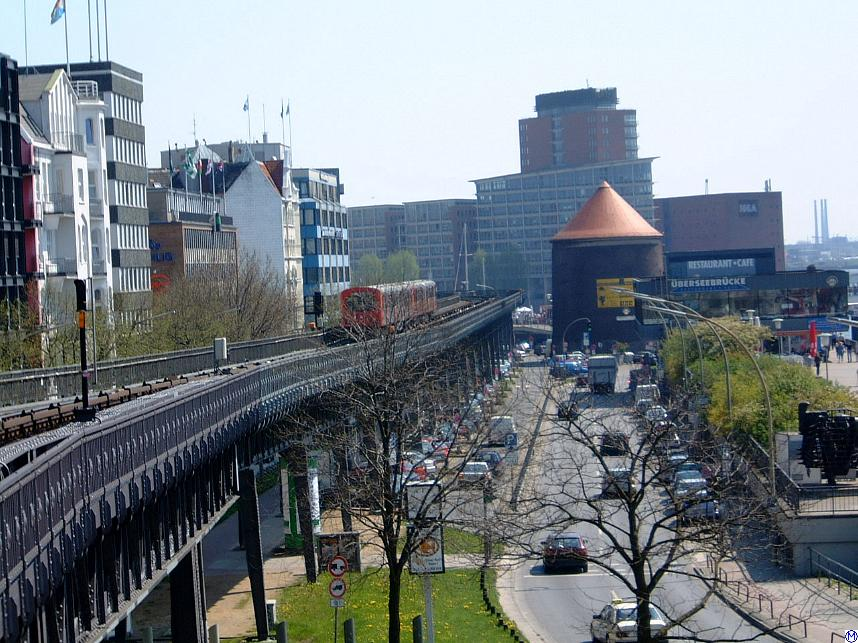
Hamburger Hochbahn on the Vorsetzen

== Future development ==
=== Abandoned projects ===
The eastern branch of the "Walddörferbahn" was originally intended to terminate at the station Beimoor, just to the north of Großhansdorf, in order to connect a proposed housing development to the public transport system. By the time work was abandoned, the station platform had already been finished and tracks had been laid. Today the remains of the station are used as a winter home for bats in the middle of a dry grass biotope.

Plans for a fourth line have been discussed since the 1970s. In those days it was planned for the line to lead from City Nord and Uhlenhorst via the city centre (Hauptbahnhof Nord and Jungfernstieg) and Altona to Lurup and Osdorfer Born. In order to link the green-field housing development at Osdorfer Born to the rest of the city as quickly as possible, a limited service on the stretch between Altona und Osdorfer Born was planned. Until the connection with the rest of the network was ready, it was intended to transport trains to the main service depot in Barmbek by flatbed trucks for maintenance. Platforms and track beds for this stretch were completed in the stations Hauptbahnhof Nord and Jungfernstieg. Preparations for tunnel constructions were made in the area of Hamburg-Altona railway station and under the motorway A 7 in Bahrenfeld. In preparation for the junction with the U1, an extra platform was built at the new station Sengelmannstraße. All these constructions remain unused to this day.

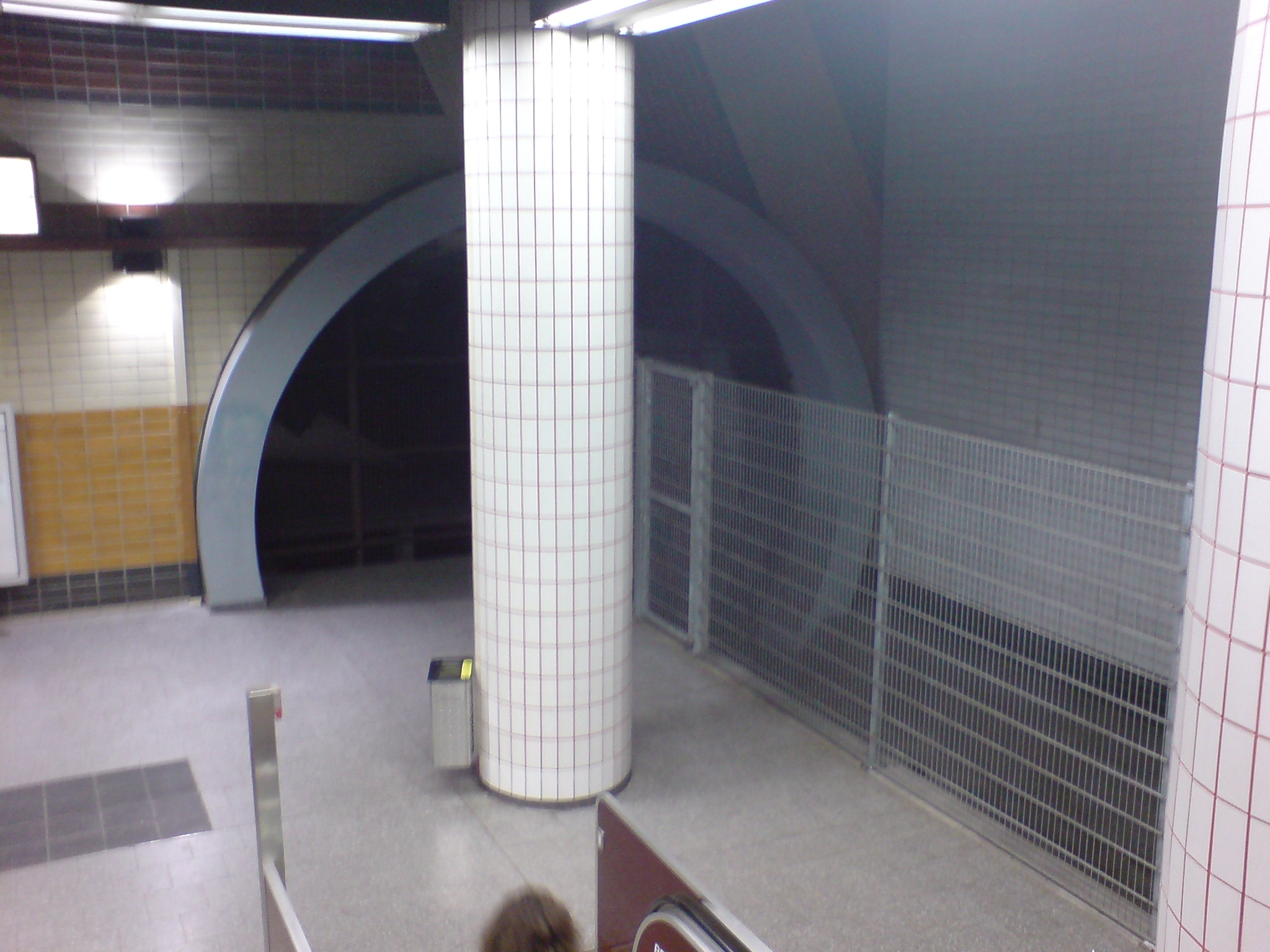
Abandoned part of Hauptbahnhof Nord

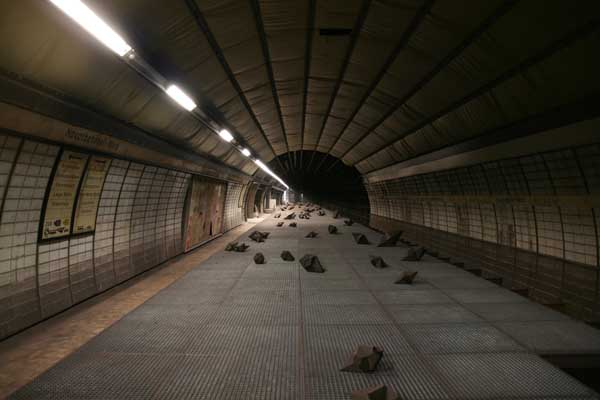
Installation Hauptbahnhof Nord

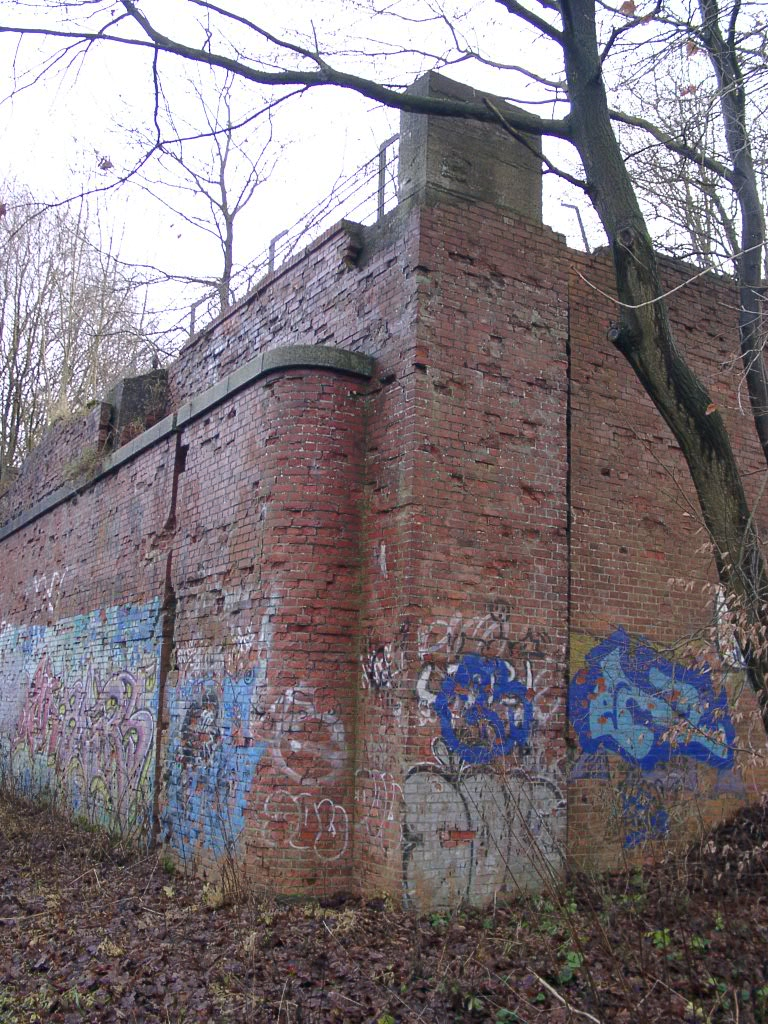
Remains of the U-Bahn station Beimoor

The northern surplus platform area at Hauptbahnhof Nord is currently used for the art installation Sterne by Raimund Kummer and Stefan Huber. Here several concrete stars lie over the whole platform area as if they had fallen from the sky. At the same time the southern surplus platform area is still unused in any kind of way in 2018, displaying the station as it was opened in 1968 since changes in terms of advertising spaces, station signs etc. were never applied there. However, none of those two unused platforms are accessible as they are locked with fences. Today both unused platforms appear deteriorated and large segments of the wall coverings are missing, which is because the complete station already suffered from water damage in the 1970s (and, to a smaller extent, still frequently does so today) and it was necessary to remove those segments in order to fix the leaking ceiling and walls. This also had to be done at the U2 platforms, but as those have been in service, the coverings were mounted to the walls again after all repairs were finished.

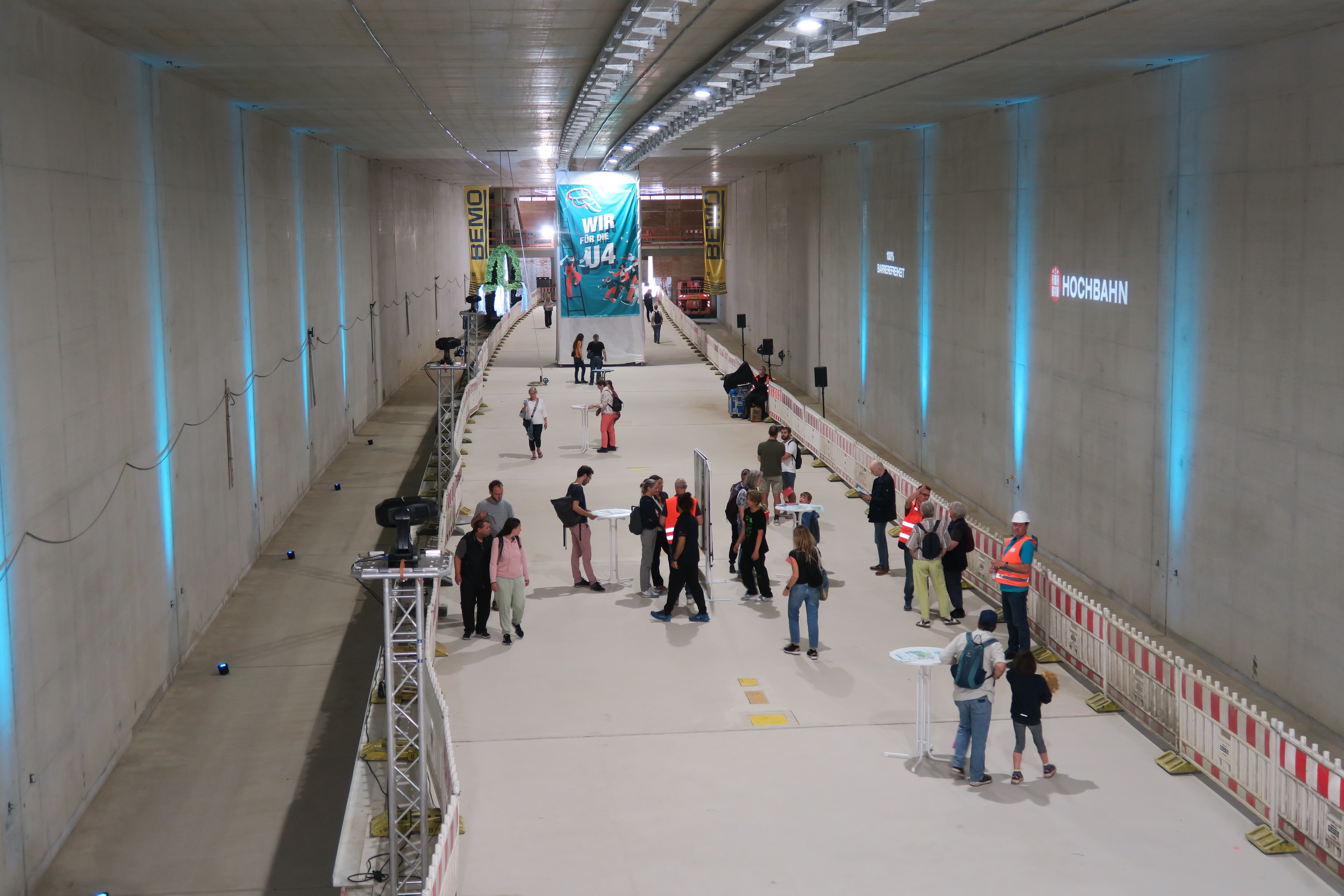
Horner Geest station under construction

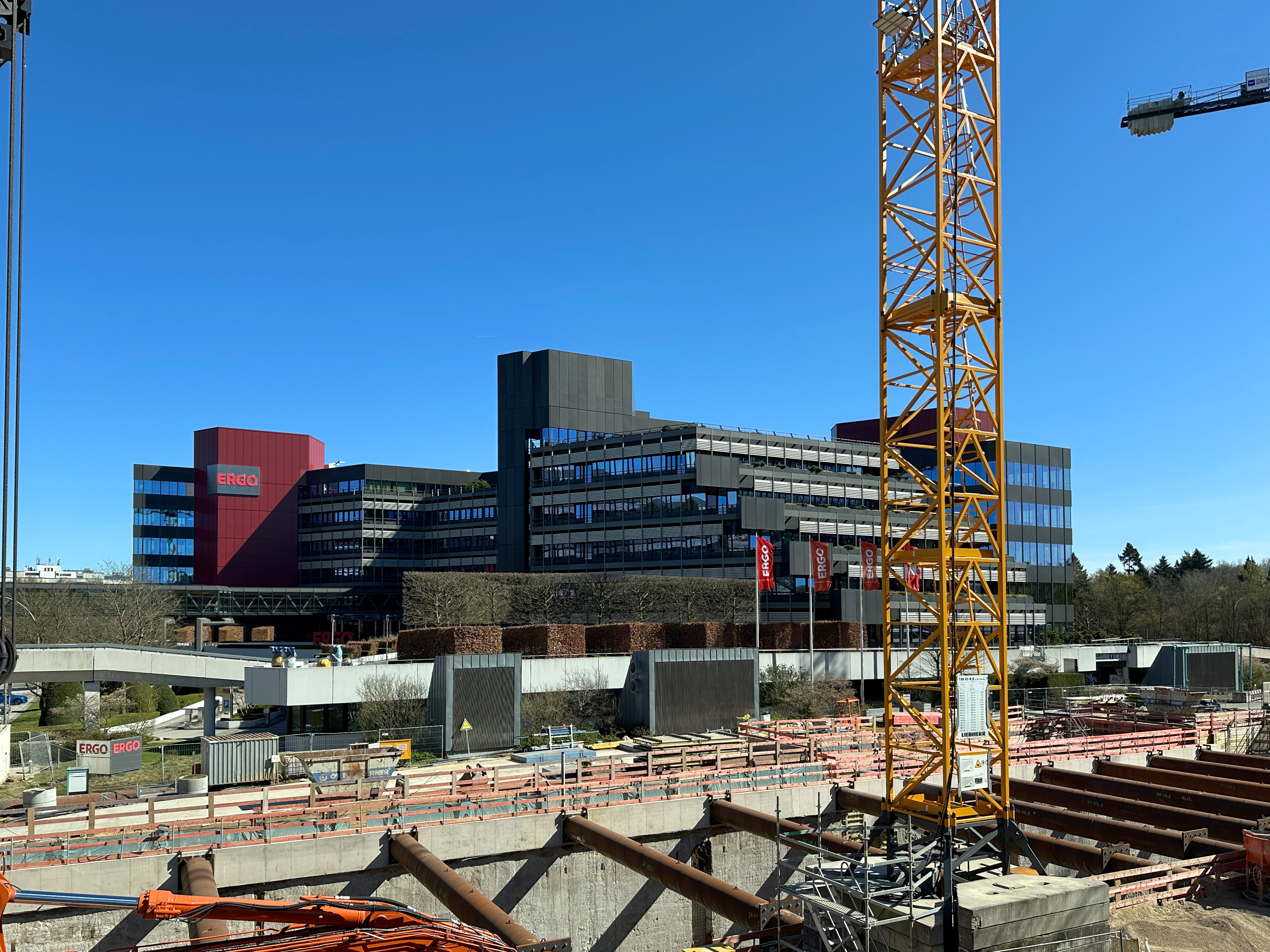
City Nord station on U5

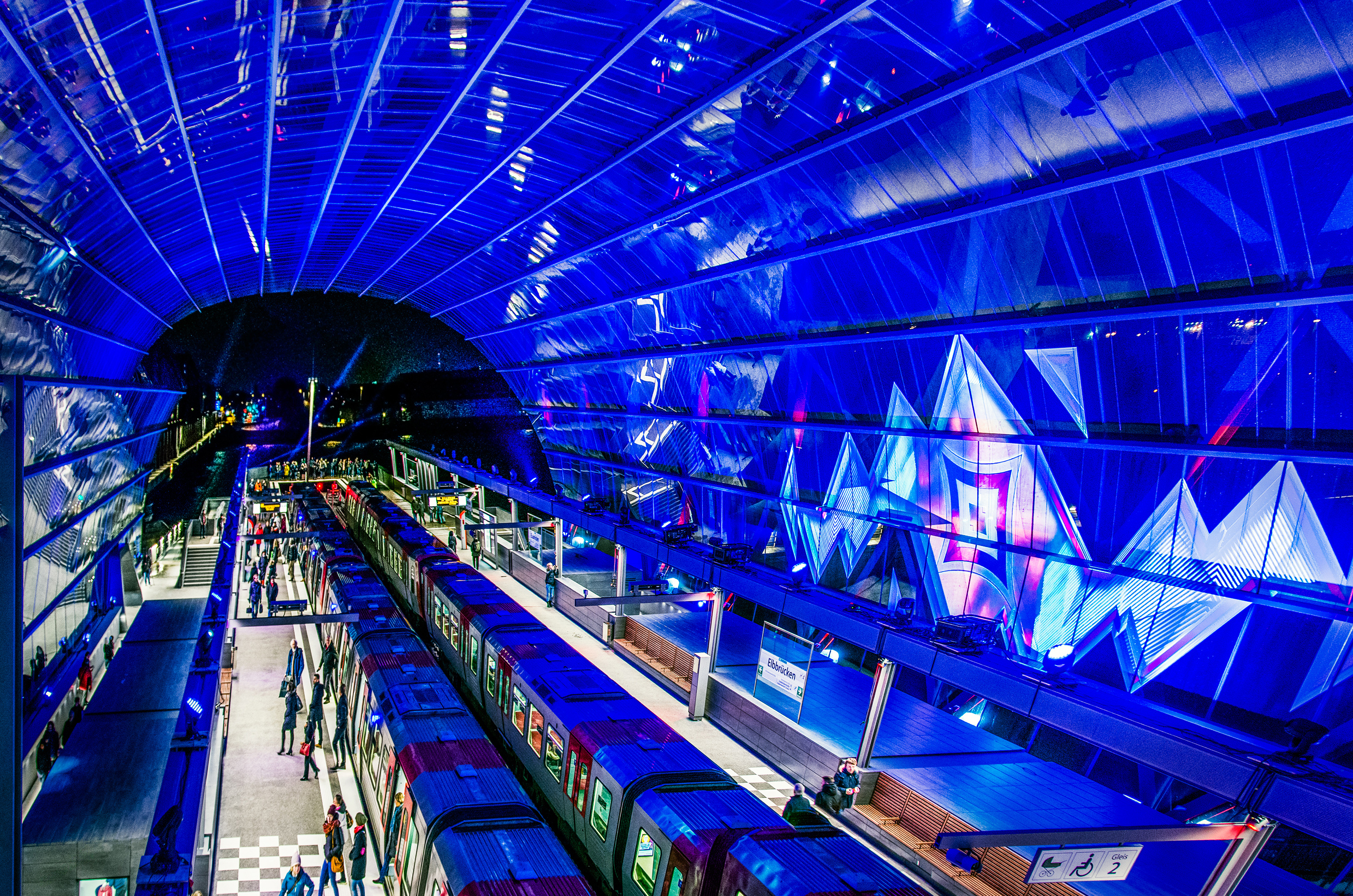
Elbbrücken terminus on line U4

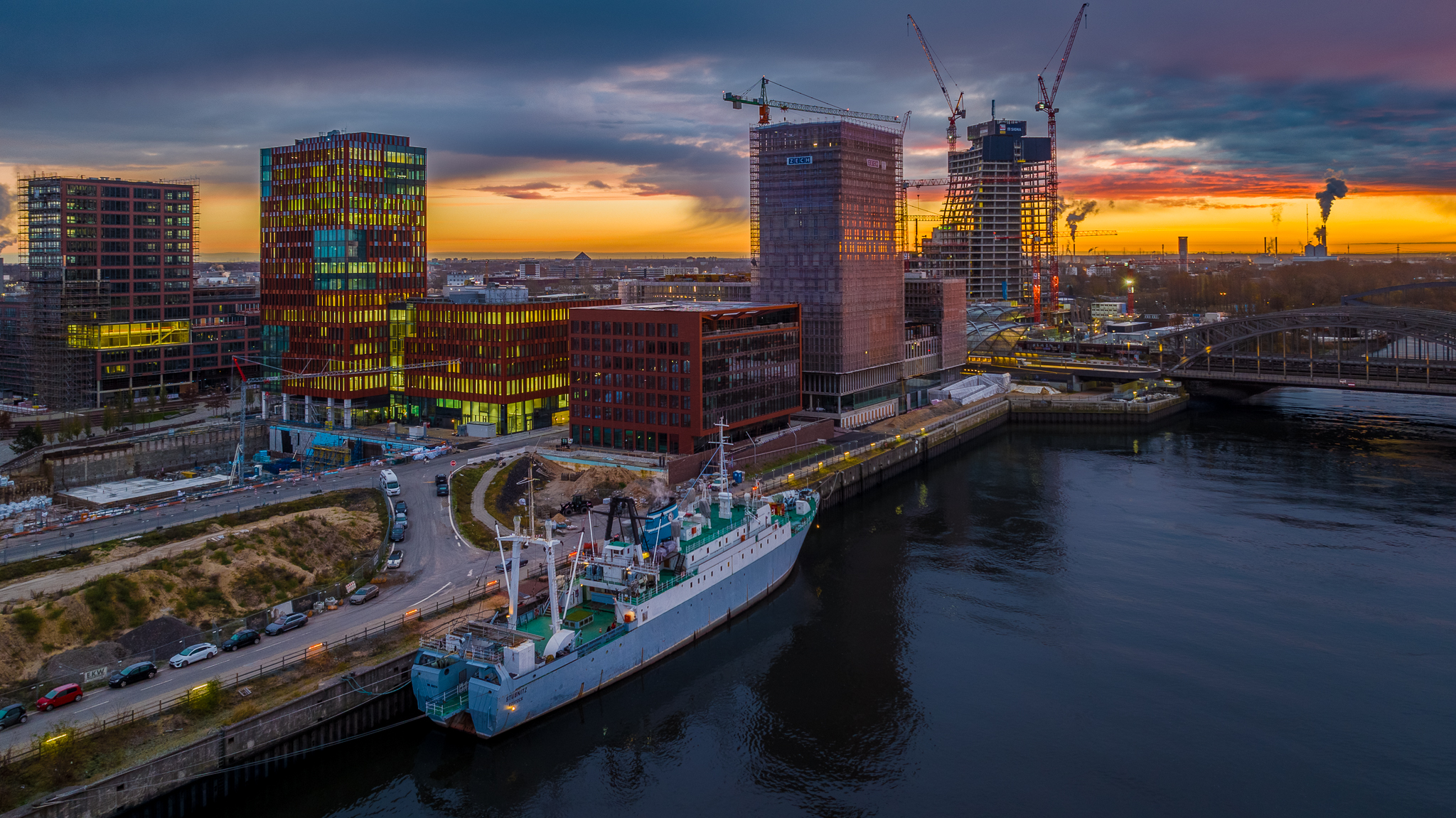
Here at Elbbrücken, the U4 is planned to be extended with a bridge

=== Current projects ===
In 2015 major subway extension plans were published. They include:

- building a new branch from Horner Rennbahn to Horner Geest with two stations, transferring the eastern terminus of the U4 from Billstedt to the new branch terminus
- building a whole new U5 line running from Osdorfer Born in the west of Hamburg to Bramfeld in the east via Uhlenhorst, representing a modified and extended version of the old U4 plans from the 1970s. The first part of the route is intended to be built between Sengelmannstrasse and Bramfeld between 2022 and 2028.

Original plans also called for the U4 to be extended southward to the S-Bahn station Harburg Rathaus via Wilhelmsburg, in order to provide a second rapid transit line to serve the south of Hamburg and relieve the busy S3/S5 that is - since its opening in 1983 - the only rapid transit service for the complete borough of Harburg and nowadays operates at its capacity limit. These plans are subject of discussions in 2018 still, no actual plans have been made so far. However, the new Elbbrücken station has been constructed in a way that allows a further extension of the line in the future.

== Network ==
The Hamburg U-Bahn consists of four lines:

Line	Route	Trains used	First opened	Length (km)	Stations
**U1**	Norderstedt Mitte – Jungfernstieg – Hauptbahnhof Süd – Ohlstedt / Großhansdorf	DT4, DT5	1914	55.4 km	46
**U2**	Niendorf Nord – Jungfernstieg – Hauptbahnhof Nord – Mümmelmannsberg	DT4, DT5	1913	24.5 km	25
**U3**	Barmbek – Circle – Barmbek – Wandsbek-Gartenstadt	DT5	1912	20.7 km	25
**U4**	Elbbrücken – Jungfernstieg – Hauptbahnhof Nord – Billstedt	DT4, DT5	2012	13.3 km	11
Total:				**106.4 km**	**91**

Line	Stretches from North / West to South / East	Stops (Terminal stations in bold)
U1	Langenhorner Bahn	**Norderstedt Mitte** (A2) – Richtweg – **Garstedt** – **Ochsenzoll** – Kiwittsmoor – Langenhorn Nord – Langenhorn Markt – **Fuhlsbüttel Nord** – Fuhlsbüttel – Klein Borstel – **Ohlsdorf** (S1)
U1	Ohlsdorf branch	**Ohlsdorf** – Sengelmannstraße – Alsterdorf – **Lattenkamp** – Hudtwalckerstraße – **Kellinghusenstraße** (U3)
U1	KellJung-Linie	**Kellinghusenstraße** – Klosterstern – Hallerstraße – **Stephansplatz** (Dammtor: S2, S5) – **Jungfernstieg** (U2, U4, S1, S3, Alster ferries, Rathaus: U3)
U1	Meßberglinie	Jungfernstieg – Meßberg – Steinstraße – **Hauptbahnhof Süd** (U3, S1, S2, S3, S5)
U1	Wandsbek extension	**Hauptbahnhof Süd** – Lohmühlenstraße – **Lübecker Straße** (U3) – **Wartenau** – Ritterstraße – Wandsbeker Chaussee (S1) – **Wandsbek Markt** – Straßburger Straße – Alter Teichweg – **Wandsbek-Gartenstadt** (U3)
U1	Walddörferbahn	**Wandsbek-Gartenstadt** – Trabrennbahn – **Farmsen** – Oldenfelde – **Berne** – Meiendorfer Weg – **Volksdorf**
U1	Walddörferbahn	**Volksdorf** – Buckhorn – Hoisbüttel – **Ohlstedt**
U1	Walddörferbahn	**Volksdorf** – Buchenkamp – Ahrensburg West – Ahrensburg Ost – Schmalenbeck – Kiekut – **Großhansdorf**
U2	Niendorf extension	**Niendorf Nord** – Schippelsweg – Joachim-Mähl-Straße – **Niendorf Markt** – Hagendeel – **Hagenbecks Tierpark**
U2	Eimsbüttel branch	**Hagenbecks Tierpark** – Lutterothstraße – Osterstraße – Emilienstraße – **Christuskirche** – **Schlump** (U3)
U2	Diameter route	**Schlump** – **Messehallen** – Gänsemarkt – Jungfernstieg (U1, U4, S1, S3, Alster ferries) – Hauptbahnhof Nord (U4, S1, S2, S3, S5) – **Berliner Tor** (U3, U4, S1, S2)
U2	Billstedt branch	**Berliner Tor** – Burgstraße – **Hammer Kirche** – Rauhes Haus – **Horner Rennbahn** – Legienstraße – **Billstedt** – Merkenstraße – Steinfurther Allee – **Mümmelmannsberg**
U3	Ring (Circle Line)	**Barmbek** (U3, S1) – **Saarlandstraße** – Borgweg – Sierichstraße – **Kellinghusenstraße** (U1) – Eppendorfer Baum – Hoheluftbrücke – **Schlump** (U2) – Sternschanze (S2, S5) – Feldstraße – **St. Pauli** – Landungsbrücken (S1, S3, Elbe ferries) – Baumwall – Rödingsmarkt – **Rathaus** (Jungfernstieg: U1, U2, U4, S1, S3) – Mönckebergstraße – Hauptbahnhof Süd (U1, S1, S2, S3, S5) – **Berliner Tor** (U2, U4, S1, S2) – **Lübecker Straße** (U1) – Uhlandstraße – **Mundsburg** – Hamburger Straße – Dehnhaide – **Barmbek** (U3, S1)
U3	Walddörferbahn	**Barmbek** – Habichtstraße – **Wandsbek-Gartenstadt** (U1)
U4	HafenCity line	**Elbbrücken** (S3, S5) – **HafenCity Universität** – Überseequartier – Jungfernstieg (U1, U2, S1, S3)
U4	Diameter route	Jungfernstieg – Hauptbahnhof Nord (U2, S1, S2, S3, S5)
U4	Billstedt branch	Hauptbahnhof Nord – **Berliner Tor** (U2, U3, S1, S2) – Burgstraße – **Hammer Kirche** – Rauhes Haus – **Horner Rennbahn** – Legienstraße – **Billstedt**
~~U~~	Rothenburgsorter Hochbahn closed in 1943 after the viaduct and the surrounding houses were destroyed in World War II	**Hauptbahnhof Süd** (U1, U3, S1, S2, S3, S5) – Spaldingstraße – Süderstraße – Brückenstraße – **Rothenburgsort** (S2)

The line names U1 und U2 were introduced with the timetable change on 22 May 1966, the name U3 followed on 2 January 1967. Until the completion of the direct inner-city stretch, the future U2, on 3 June 1973, the partial services on the already completed eastern (Hauptbahnhof Nord − Berliner Tor (− Barmbek) since 29 September 1968) and western (Schlump − Gänsemarkt since 31 May 1970) sections were known as U21 and U22 respectively.

=== U4 project ===
Hamburger Hochbahn opened the new line U4 in November 2012. There had been an ongoing discussion about the costs and the benefit of this line, but the government of Hamburg decided to build it nevertheless. The underground line was dug using the same machinery as for the building of the new tunnel of the Elbe tunnel.

=== Services ===
Services operate with a 5 or 10-minute frequency with the exception of the northeastern peripheral branches of U1 that have a 10 or 20-minute frequency. During peak times the frequency is increased to 3/3/4-minute or even 2/3-minute patterns. Since the timetable change in December 2004 the U-Bahn operates an all-night, 20-minute service interval on Friday and Saturday nights. From Sunday to Thursday the U-Bahn operates from 4 am to about 1 am.

== Stations ==
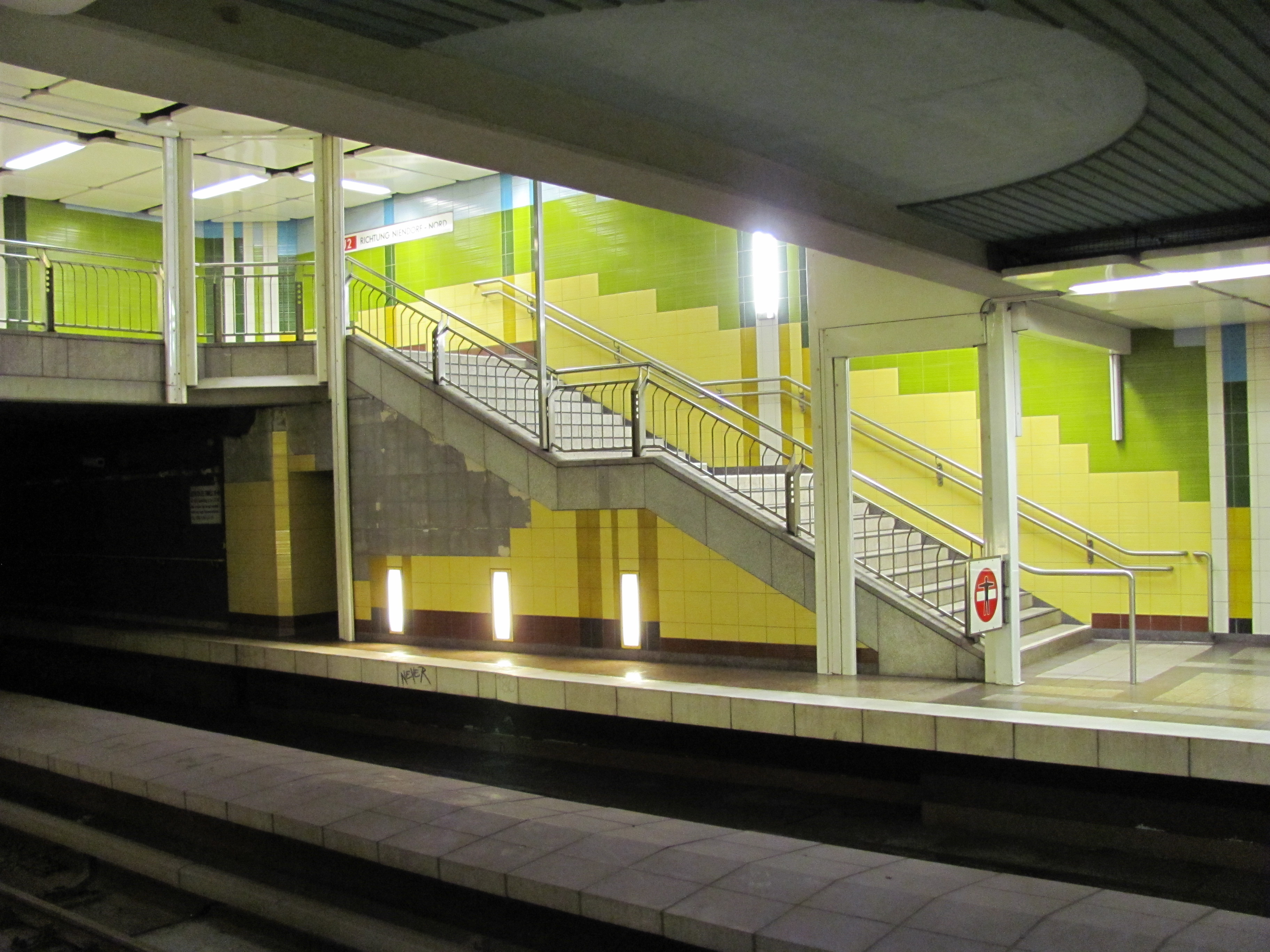
Joachim-Mähl-Strasse station

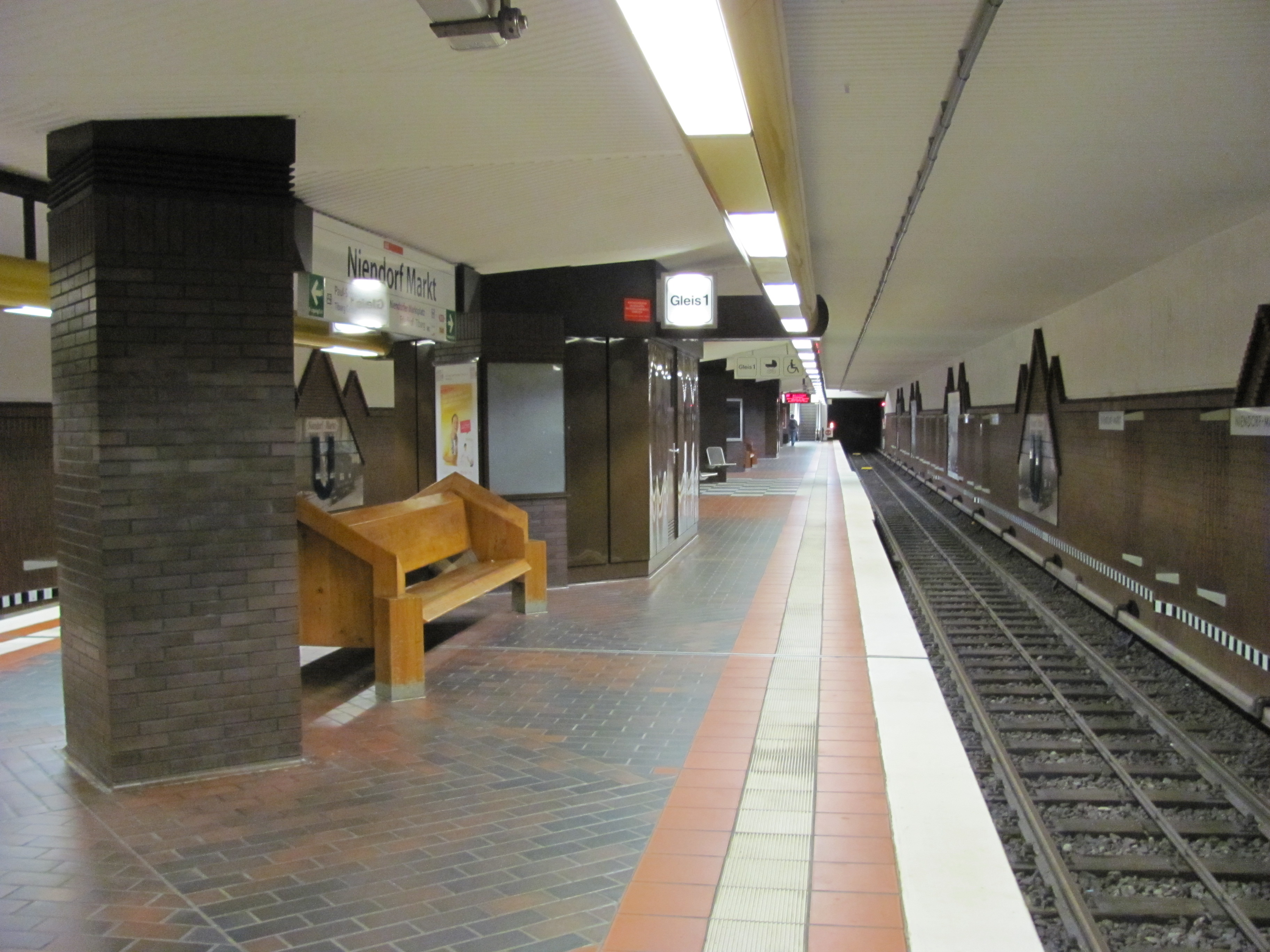
Niendorf Markt station

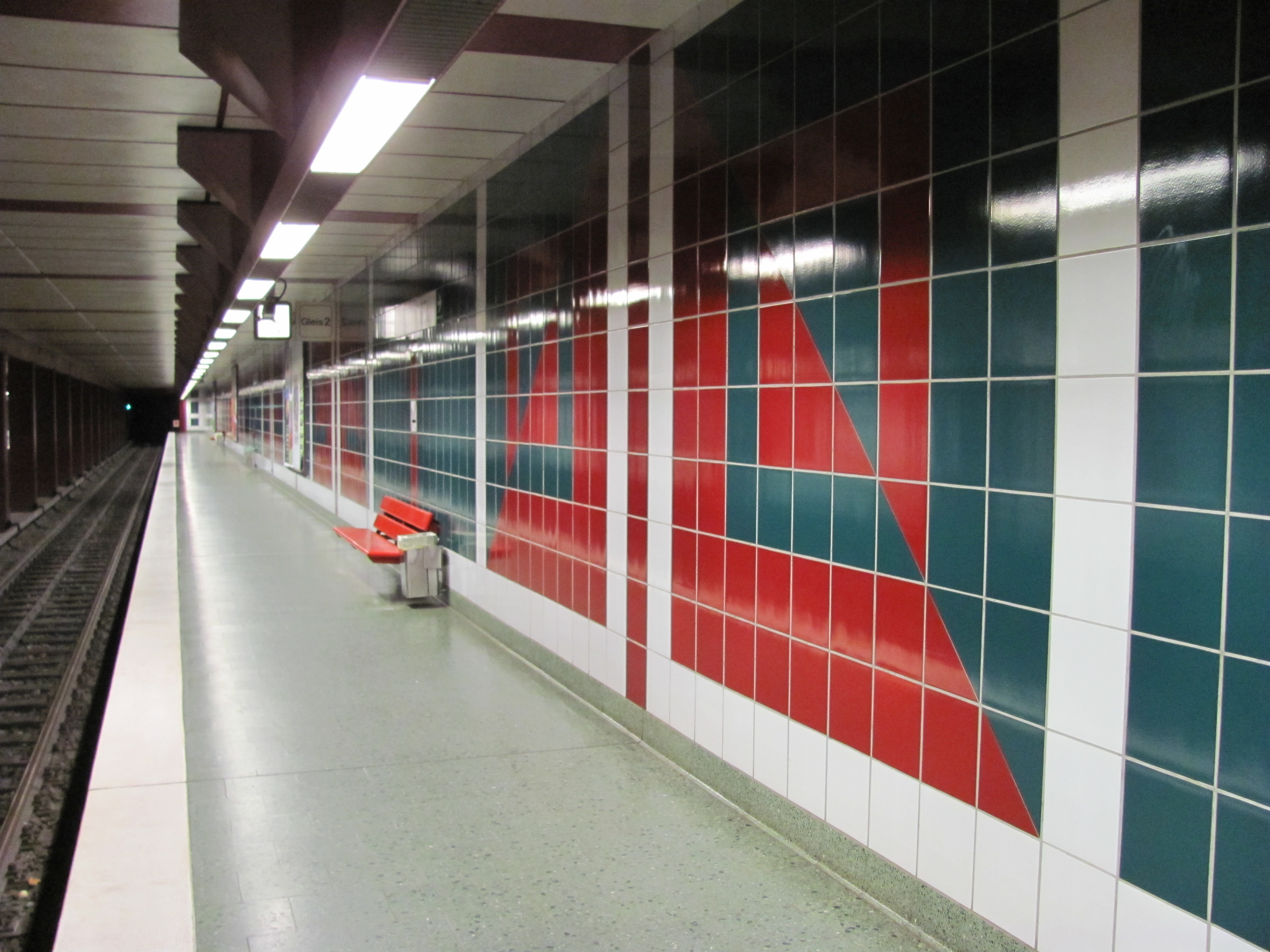
Hagendeel station

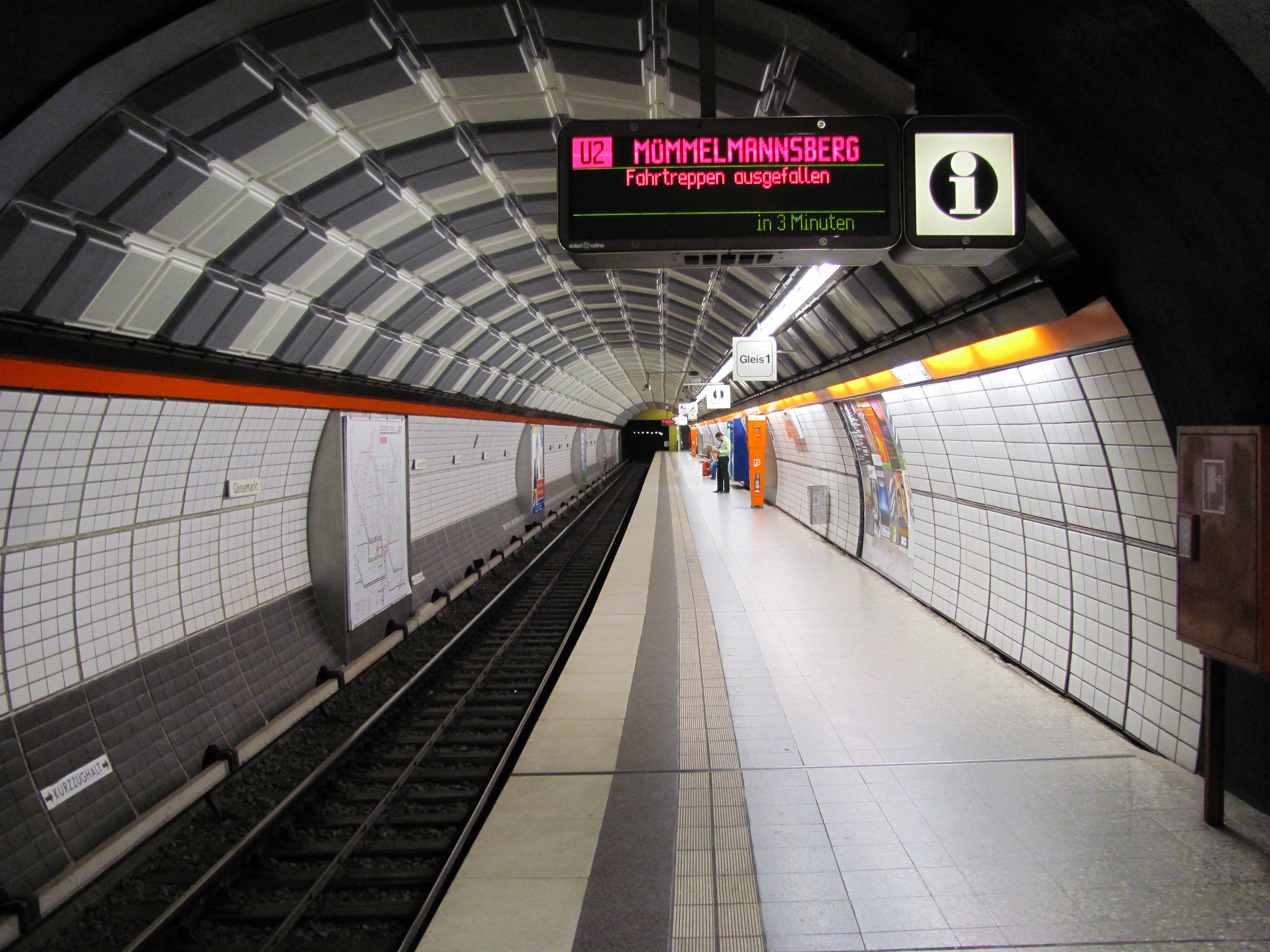
Gänsemarkt station

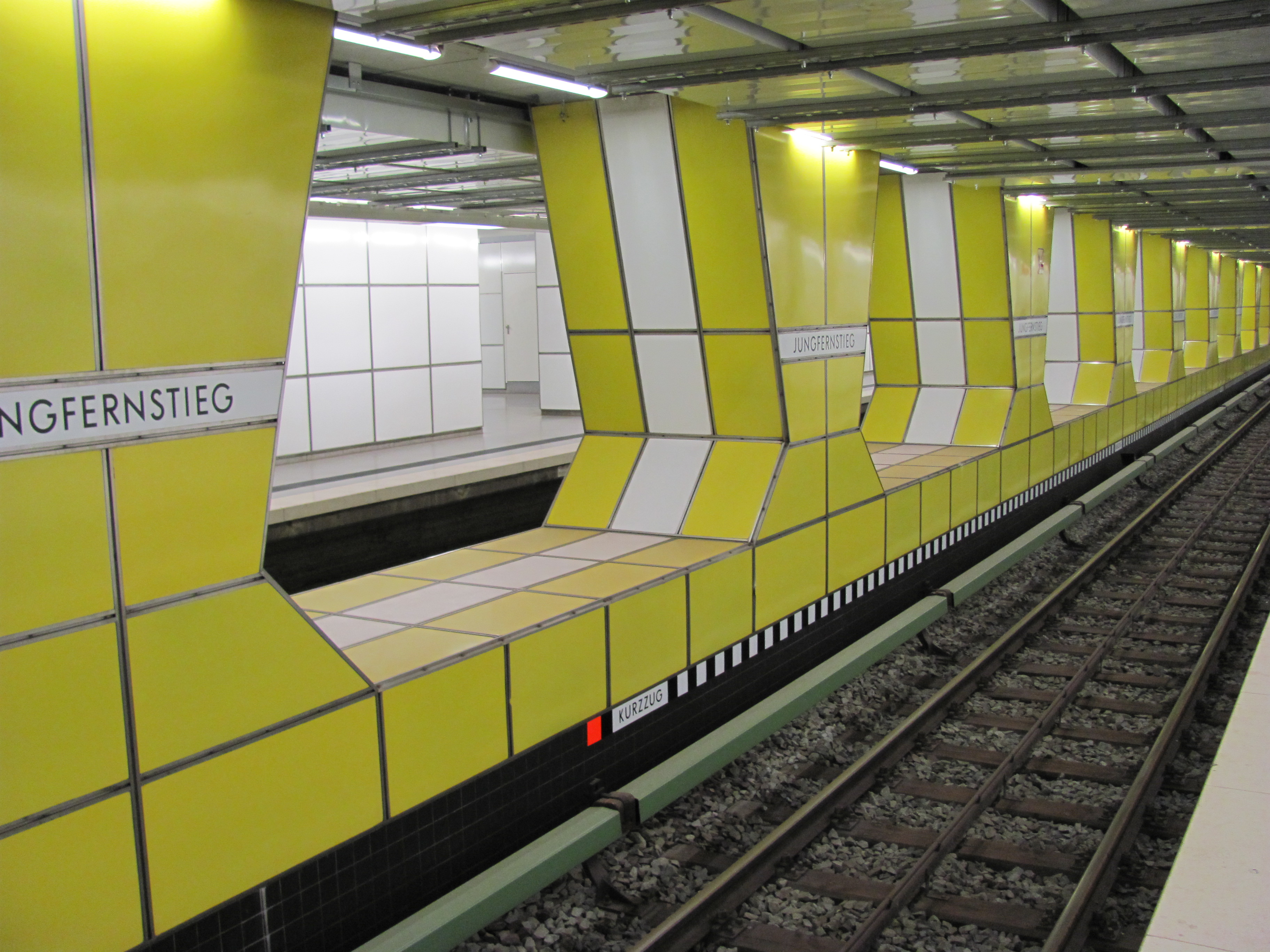
Jungfernstieg station

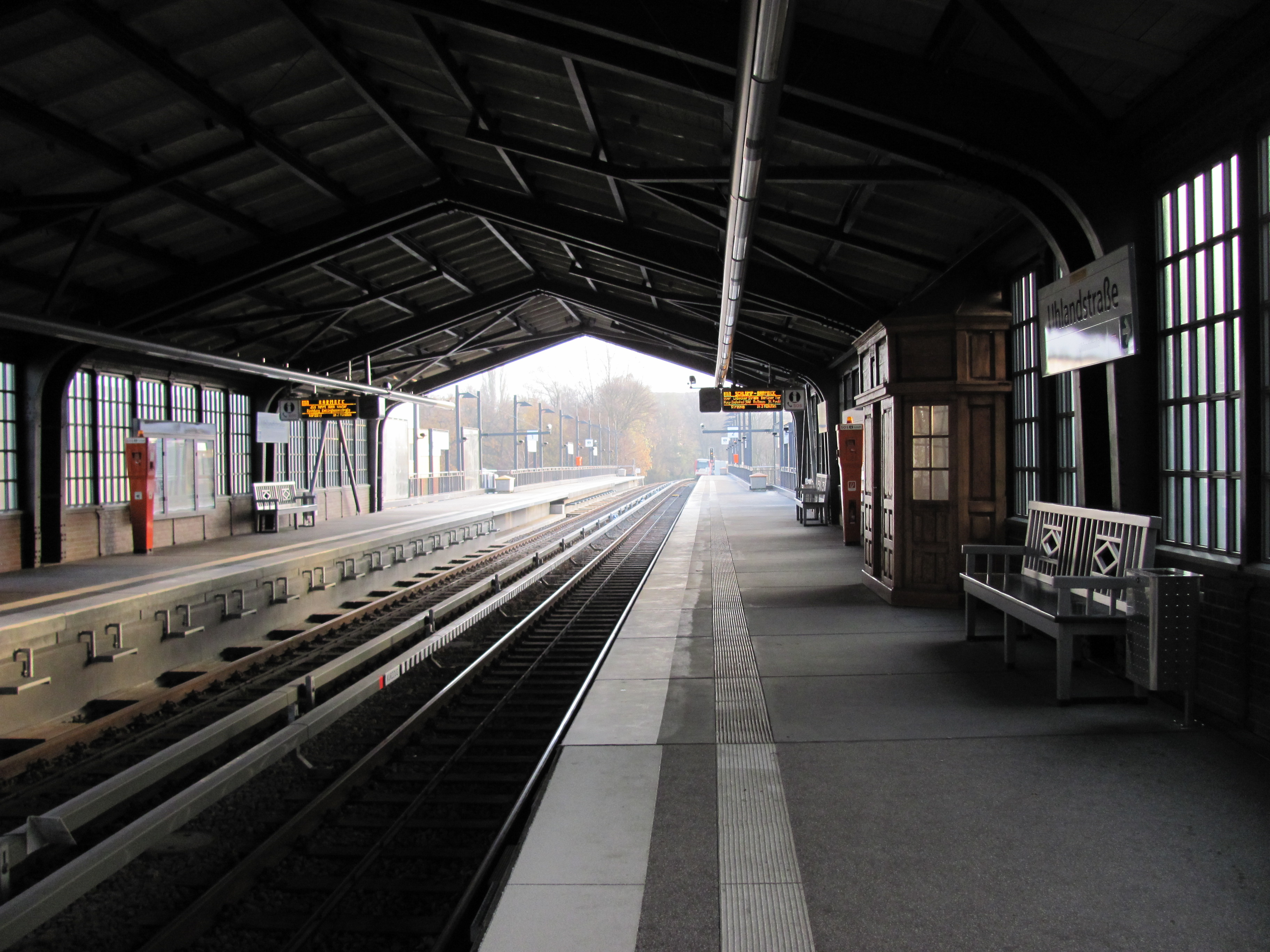
Uhlandstrasse station

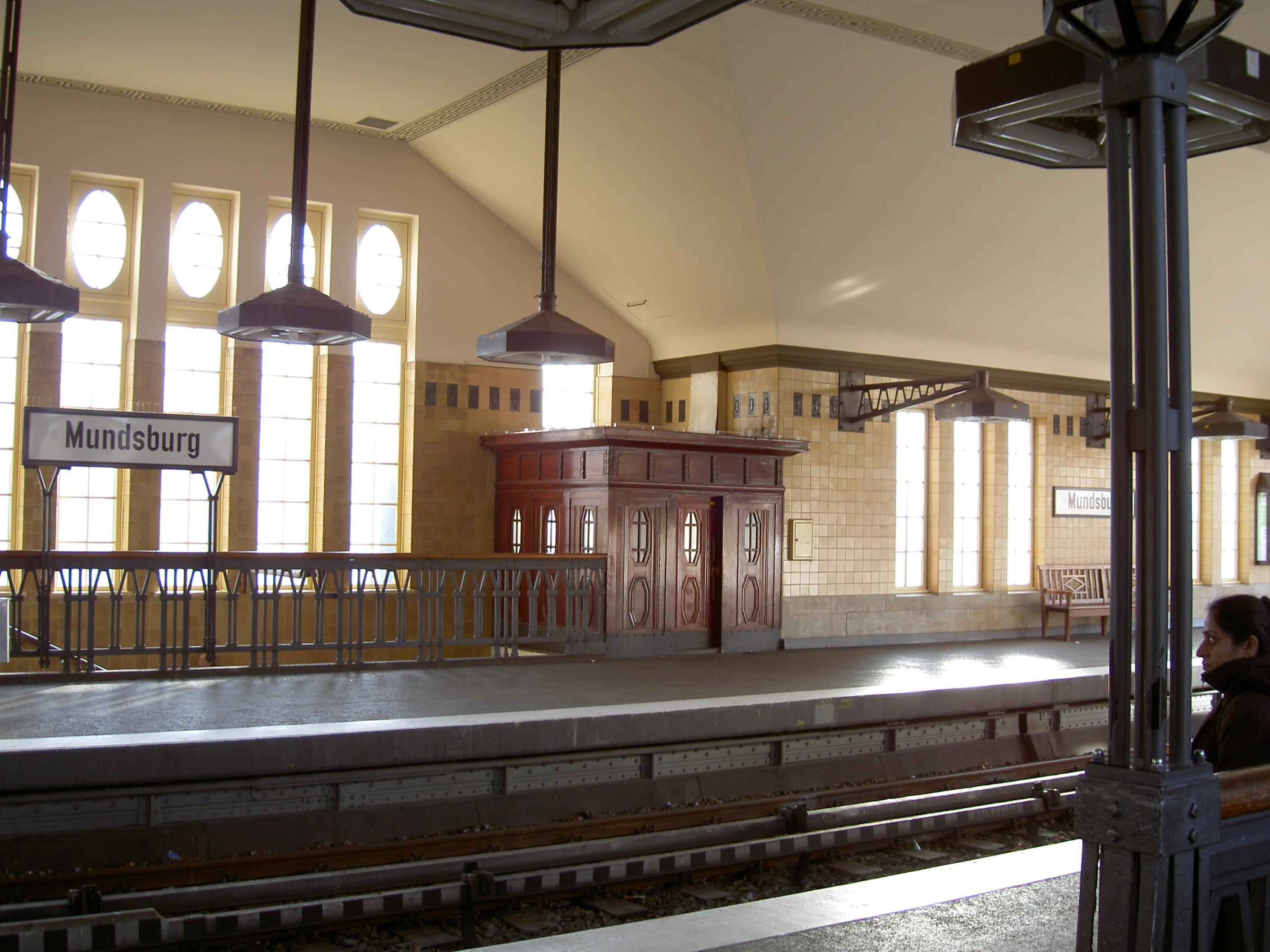
Mundsburg station

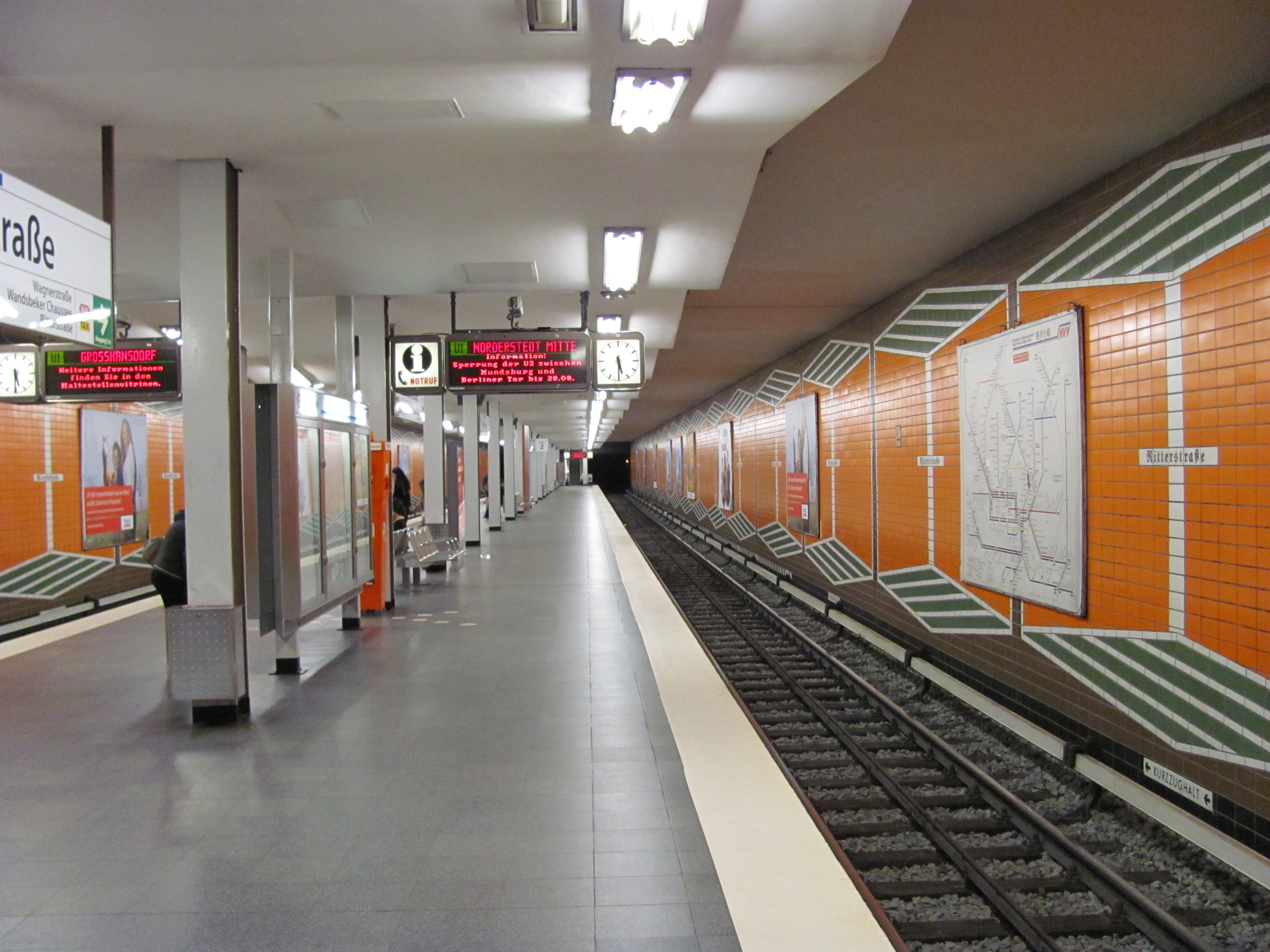
Ritterstrasse station

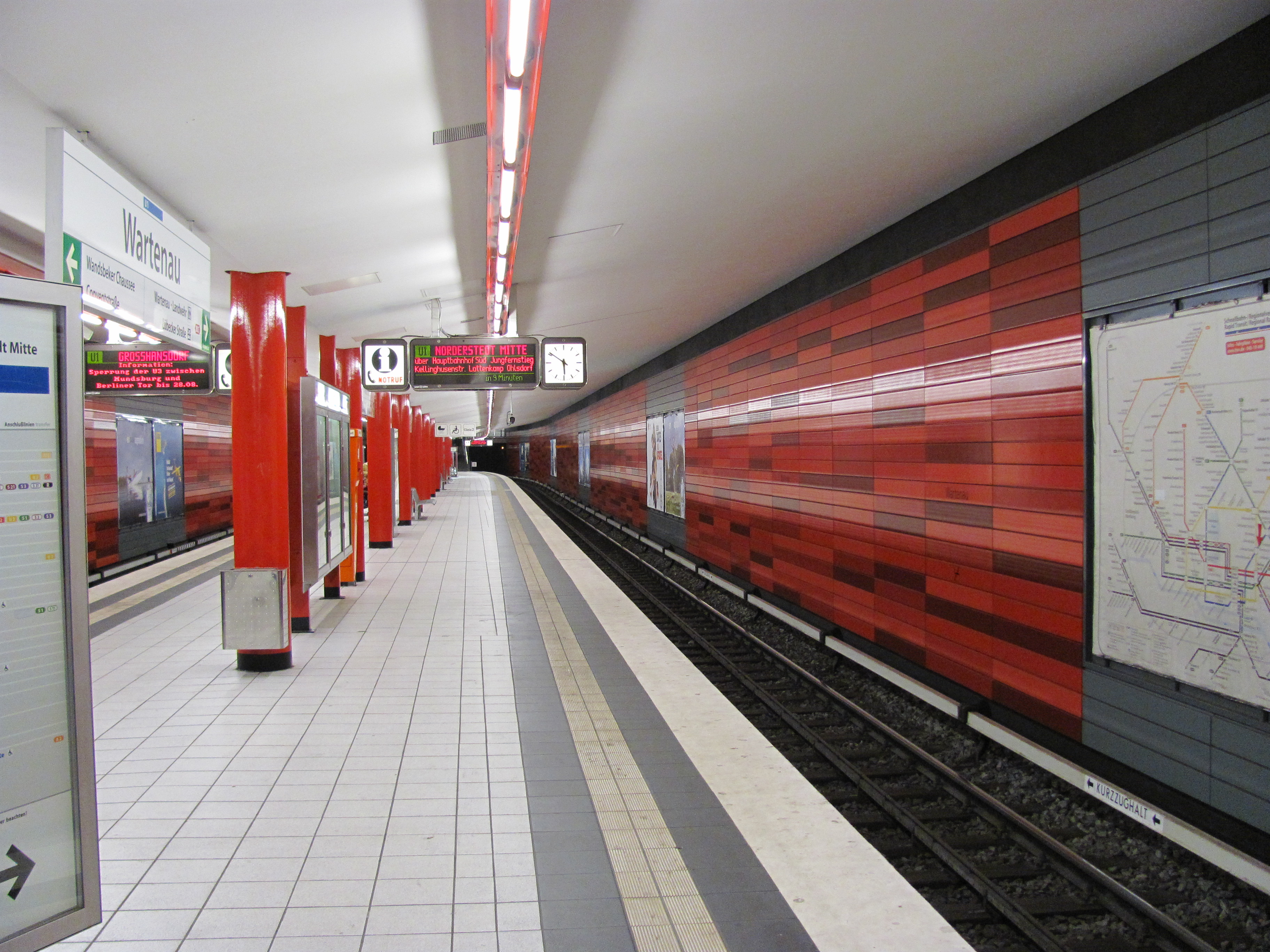
Wartenau station

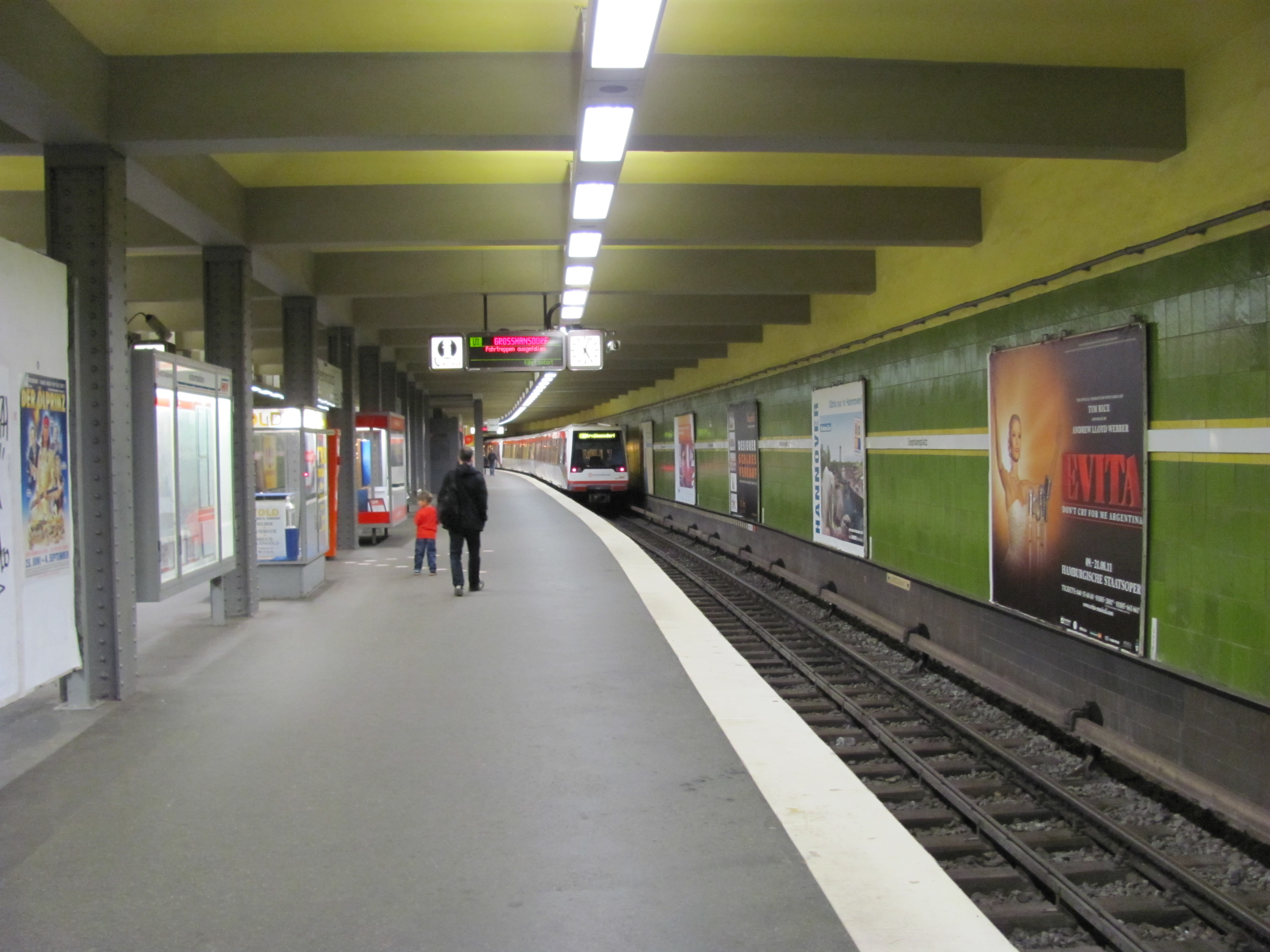
Stephansplatz station

=== Hamburg Hauptbahnhof ===
Hamburg Hauptbahnhof is a central junction with the mainline railway, and, due to the confluence of all U-Bahn lines and all S-Bahn lines, an important interchange for suburban public transport as well.

Tunnels for the first underground railway were constructed at the same time as the Hauptbahnhof itself. The tunnels run underneath the mainline tracks, which are themselves below street level. The current U3 stops at this station, which, for more clarity, is now known as Hauptbahnhof Süd. There is also an underground pedestrian tunnel parallel to the U3 circle line tunnel, which allowed a quick connection to the mainline platforms until the major part of it was closed off in 1991. The remaining part of the tunnel can still be used today to reach the S-Bahn platforms.

The unusual width of the vaulted station is due to the fact that it originally housed four tracks; the Rothenburgsort branch, which was destroyed in World War II and never rebuilt, used to begin here. The inner tracks remained in service until the 1970s and were used to terminate additional service trains until the trackbeds were covered to create one wide instead of two narrow platforms. The tracks that led up the ramp to the decommissioned line were used as layup tracks during that time. In 1960 the tunnel leading to the ramp was cut off as the then-built U1 tunnel crosses right through it.

The tunnels for the U1 were driven under the mainline railway next to the U3 tunnels in 1959, the platform for the U1 lies directly south to the U3 and is accessible via the same station entrances.

The opening of the line U2 (U21 in 1969) lead to the construction of a further underground station Hauptbahnhof Nord to serve it. The station is 30 metres (98 ft) below the surface; in the direction of the Jungfernstieg station, the tunnels pass under the Aussenalster, an artificial lake. The two outer platforms remain unused since their construction and were originally intended for a proposed U-Bahn line between Altona/Lurup and Winterhude/City Nord (see above).

== Operating company ==
The system is owned and operated by the Hamburger Hochbahn (HHA), except the Garstedt – Norderstedt Mitte section, which is owned by the Verkehrsgesellschaft Norderstedt (VGN) but also operated by the Hamburger Hochbahn.

== Rolling stock ==
The Hamburg U-Bahn uses standard gauge electric multiple units that run on third rail with 750 volts DC. The current fleet mostly consists of trains that had been developed from the 1950s to 1980s. In 2012, newly developed trains were introduced. A typical Hamburg U-Bahn train is made up of six (U3 line), eight or nine cars (all other lines). Trains with four cars can also be found during weekends or late nights.

=== Current rolling stock ===
==== Type DT4 ====
The Type DT4 was introduced in 1988 to replace the Type DT1, most of the DT2 trains and some DT3 trains. The Type DT4 came with a more futuristic design, reduced noise, increased safety and greater economy than the older trains. A total of 126 units were built in six batches from 1988 to 2005. Due to the long construction span the batches slightly differ from each other in terms of interior and exterior design, propulsion and destination signs. Also the first two batches had doors operated by handles, which were replaced by buttons around 2004.

Since 2011 the older DT4 trains are being refurbished as the oldest units are almost 30 years old already, by July 2018 the first 50 of 126 units have been refurbished. Additionally the electrical equipment (including propulsion) of the units 141 and 143–150 has been replaced by the equipment used in the sixth and youngest batch in order to receive spare parts for the aging first two batches, making mixed usage of these units with any other batch than the sixth impossible as their propulsion is incompatible to the one used in older units.

==== Type DT5 ====
The Type DT5 was introduced in 2012 to completely renew the current rolling stock. By July 2018, 89 of 118 planned units have been built and delivered. The Type DT5 is the first type of U-Bahn trains in Hamburg with air-conditioning and open gangways between the cars. More DT5 units were ordered than necessary for replacement of all DT2E and DT3E units, in order to enlarge the total number of cars in revenue service to be able to provide additional service in the future. By 2023, all ordered DT5 trains had been delivered.

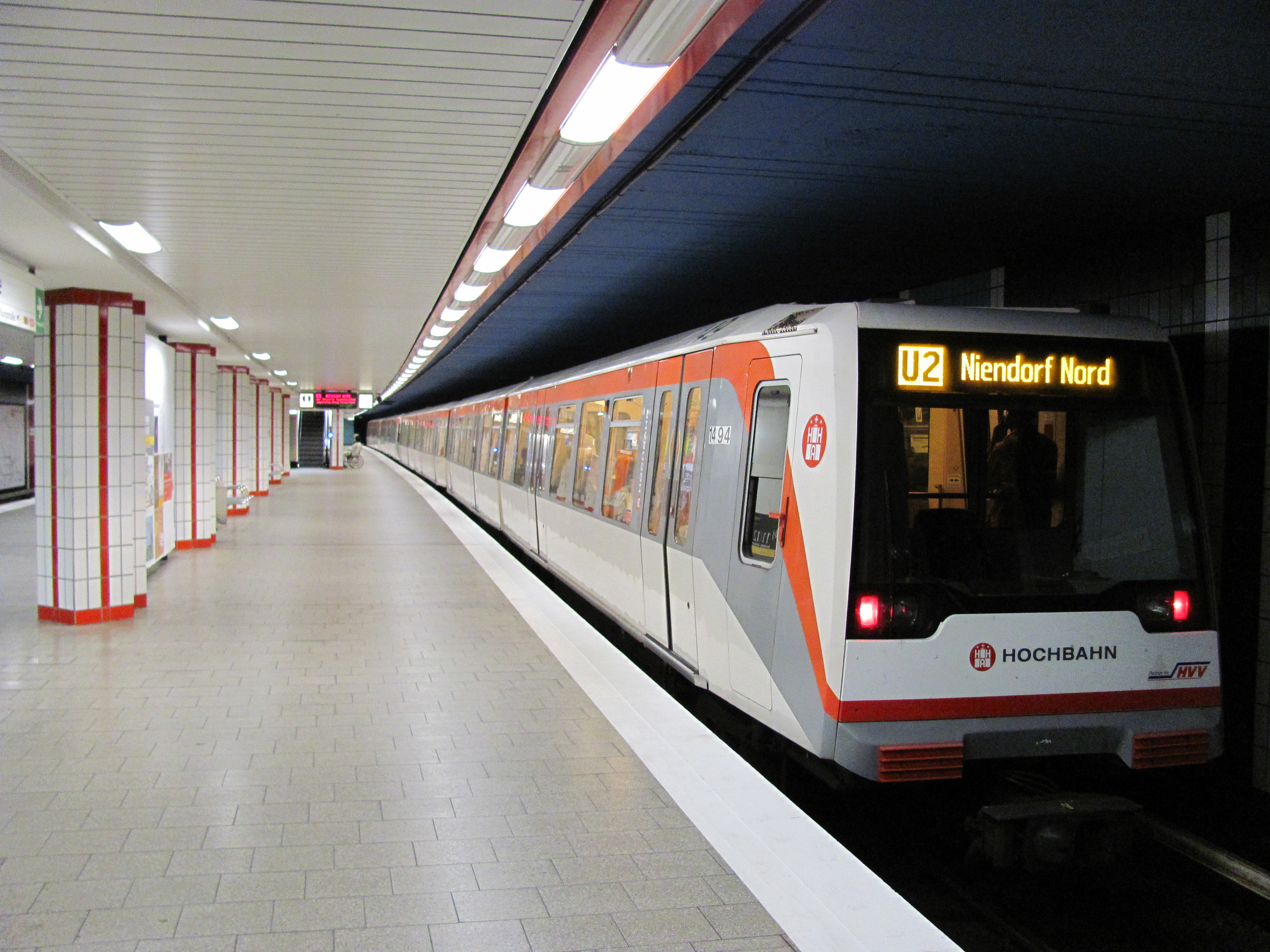
Type DT4

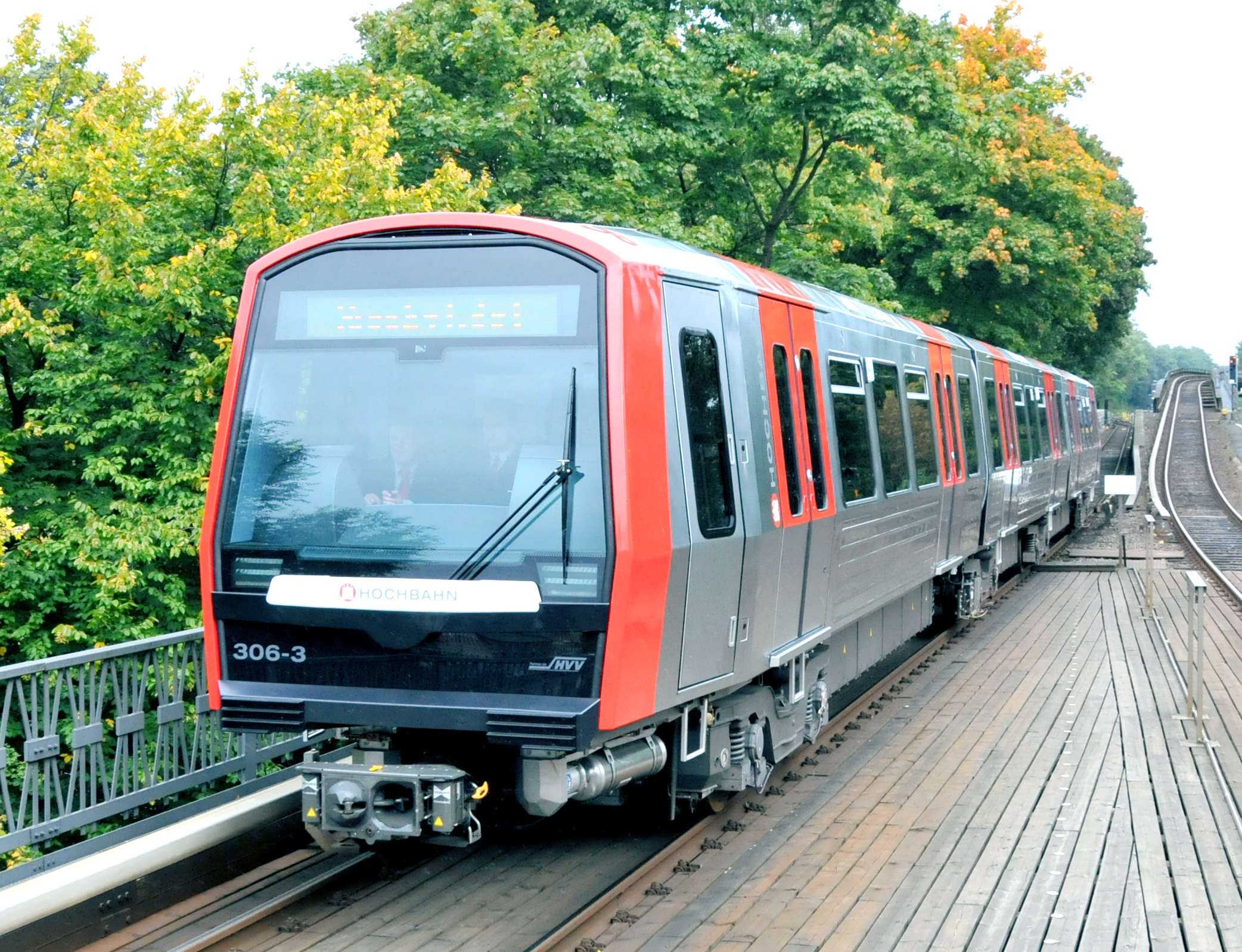
Type DT5

=== Future Rolling Stock ===
==== Type DT6 ====
In July 2024, Hamburger Hochbahn awarded Alstom a framework contract for the supply of up to 374 DT6 trains, together with the signalling equipment required for the new U5 line. The agreement, worth up to €2.8 billion, is the largest single contract awarded in Hochbahn's history. An initial firm order, valued at approximately €670 million, covers 48 four-car trains, comprising 41 DT6-F units for the existing network and seven driverless DT6-A units for the U5. The DT6-F fleet is intended to progressively replace the older DT4 trains, while the DT6-A variant will operate in fully automated, unattended service on the U5. Production is being undertaken by Alstom at its Salzgitter plant. Series deliveries are planned to begin from 2027, with the first trains expected to enter testing in Hamburg ahead of the introduction of passenger service. The framework agreement provides for up to 254 DT6-F and 120 DT6-A units in total.

=== Former rolling stock ===
==== Type T/TU ====
The HHA Type T was introduced with the Hamburg U-Bahn itself. Nearly 400 cars were built from 1911 to 1943. Some cars were destroyed in World War II; these cars were rebuilt from 1947 to 1949 and signed as Type TU1. To raise the economy, another 100 cars were rebuilt from 1959 to 1961 and signed as TU2. The passenger service for the T/TU-type ended in 1970, some cars were converted to working service cars and were used until the 1980s. Five cars are preserved for museum rides, four of them in service and one awaiting restoration.

==== Type DT1 ====
The Type DT1 was used from 1958 to 1991 in revenue service. A total of 100 cars (or 50 units) were produced. The Type DT1 had a much better acceleration than the T-type; however, their high energy consumption caused by their high weight left the Hamburger Hochbahn in dissatisfaction with the new trains, moving them into rush-hour service only in the 1970s. Most units were scrapped after their retirement while some cars were converted into working trains (retired in 2005) and three units were preserved for museum rides: The first one (516) was rebuilt between 1997 and 2000 and is used as a bar train that can be chartered for events. The second unit (512) awaits restoration until today, while the third unit (518) donates spare parts to both the other units. As the restoration of 512 has not begun by July 2018 (it is unknown whether the restoration will actually take place someday), 516 serves as the de facto DT1 museum unit.

==== Type DT2 ====
The Type DT2 was introduced in 1962 to replace the Type T trains. After the experiences with the heavy DT1 trains they were constructed as light-weight cars with weaker engines to save energy. A total of almost 200 units were built from 1960 to 1966. Most of them also were rebuilt in the 1980s and 1990s as their lifespan was actually only intended to be 20–25 years. The refurbished units were called DT2E, however, only the last two of five batches received a full refurbishment together with a new front design. All cars of the first three batches were retired between 1997 and 2002, with the third batch already been taken out of service in 1994 as they slightly differed from the other units (also as only two of 15 DT2.3 were rebuilt). After the official retirement in 2004, 15 units remained in service as an operational reserve. Those were retired on 28 November 2015 after being replaced by new DT5 trains. One non-refurbished unit is preserved for museum rides but has not been sent into restoration yet (2018).

==== Type DT3 ====
The Type DT3 was introduced in 1968 to shorten the journey time on the U1 line. A total of 127 units were built from 1966 to 1971. 68 units were rebuilt from 1994 to 2001 and received a new front design, they are called DT3E (E = ertüchtigt = rebuilt, in this case). Six units (921–926) kept their original red front designed in the 1960s, they were equipped with LZB for semi-automatic operation between 1981 and 1985. The other 59 units were retired and scrapped due to structural issues and were replaced by new DT4 trains between 1995 and 2003, one unit (909) is being preserved to be restored and used as a museum train once all DT3 are retired. Between 2008 and 2011, most of the 68 remaining units received an interior refurbishing once again.

The prototype unit and the last built unit were converted to induction motors around 1980 (being called DT3-DAT from then), in order to test this new technology for the upcoming order of the new DT4 series. They operated in revenue service until 1989 and were scrapped in 1995 (932) and 2000 (931).

As the DT3 is currently the oldest train type in the system, new DT5 trains are replacing them since 2013 and retirement has started in late 2015. By July 2018 28 of once 127 DT3 trains are still in service, only running on additional rush-hour services as regular service ended in Summer 2017. All six DT3-LZB units were retired in December 2016 because of their rusting bodies and the worn-out interiors (no DT3-LZB received the 2008 redesign), they were scrapped together with several refurbished units in 2017.

10 units were rebuilt once again at FWM in Hennigsdorf to serve as an operational reserve for about 10 more years. They received small propulsion modifications, the interior redesign of 2008 (most of those units were not refurbished back then), improved departure signals and structural issues of the wearing car bodies are being fixed. The newly rebuilt cars are called "DT3N", in order to distinguish them from the regular DT3E cars as the technical modifications render electric coupling between both types impossible when running in revenue service. After severe electrical damage was discovered on one unit in 2023, Type DT3N trains have been fully withdrawn from service as similar damage was to be expected on other units. On 15 October 2023, a farewell tour took place on line U3. Two units (808 and 873) were preserved for museum purposes, all other units are being scrapped.

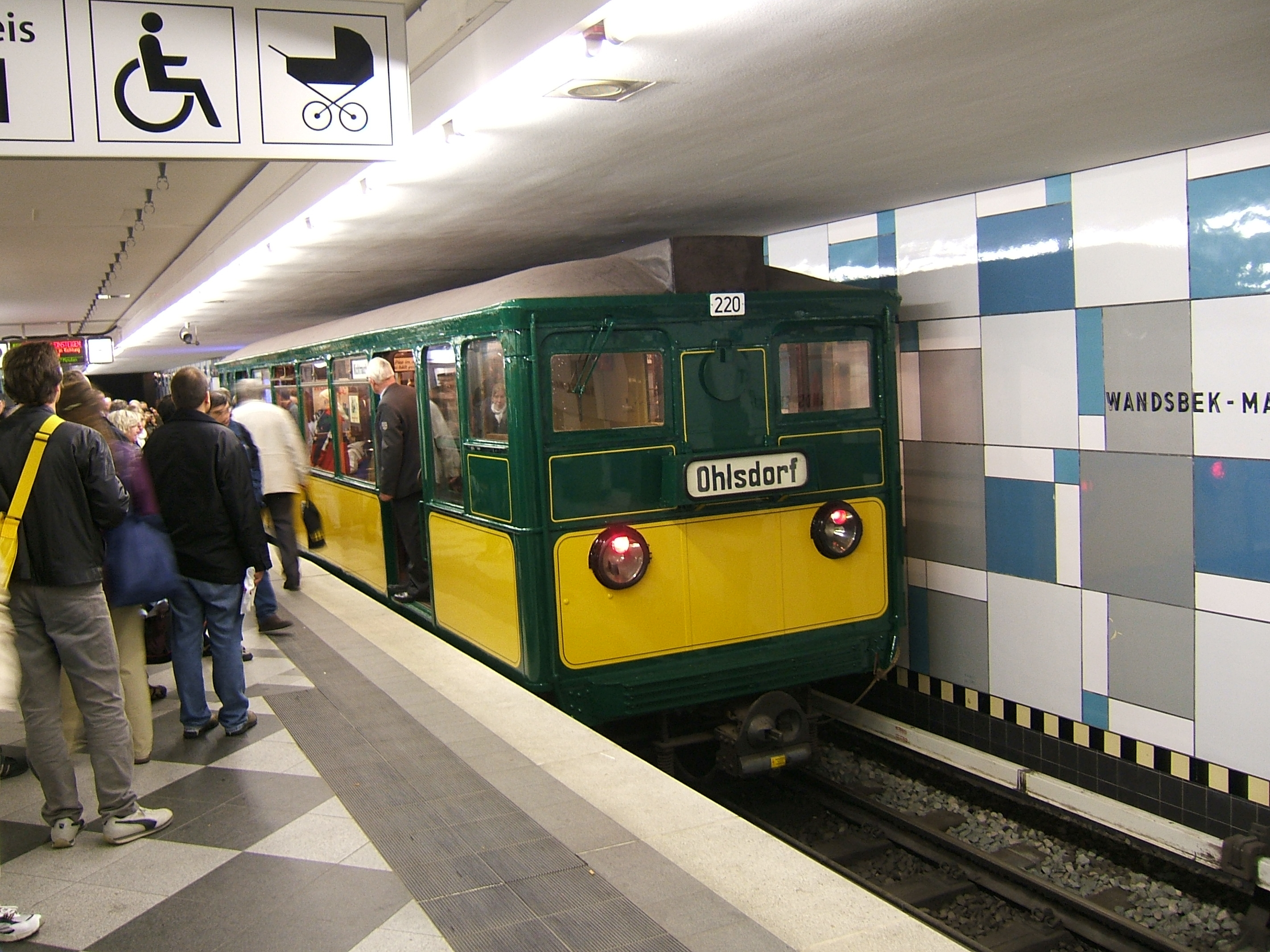
Type T, retired in the 1960s

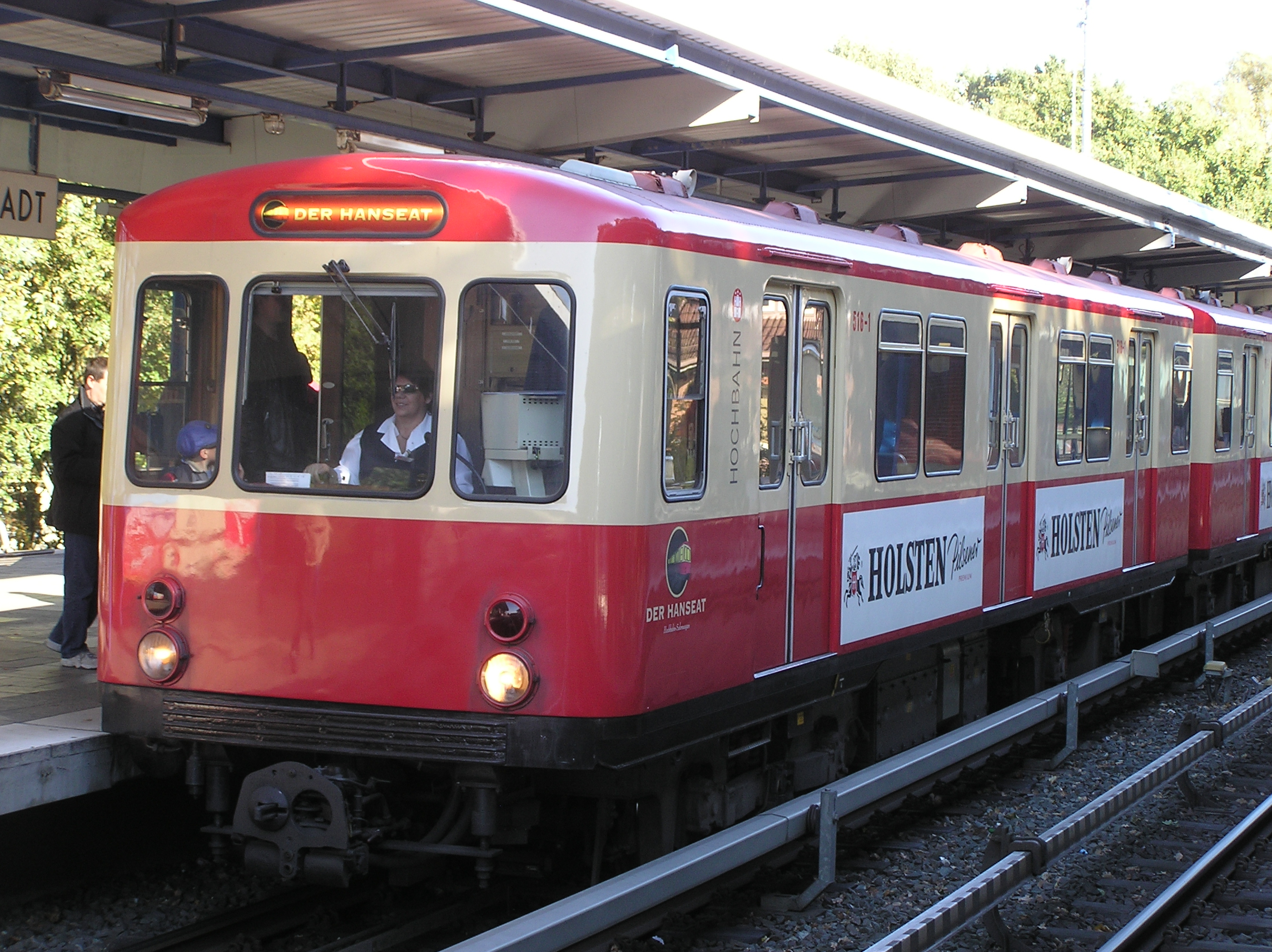
Type DT1, retired in 1991

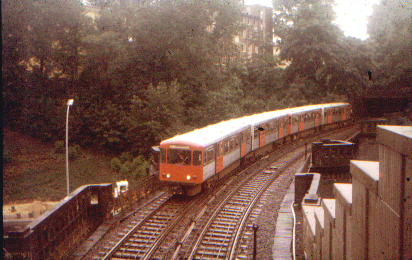
Type DT2 (original), retired in 2002

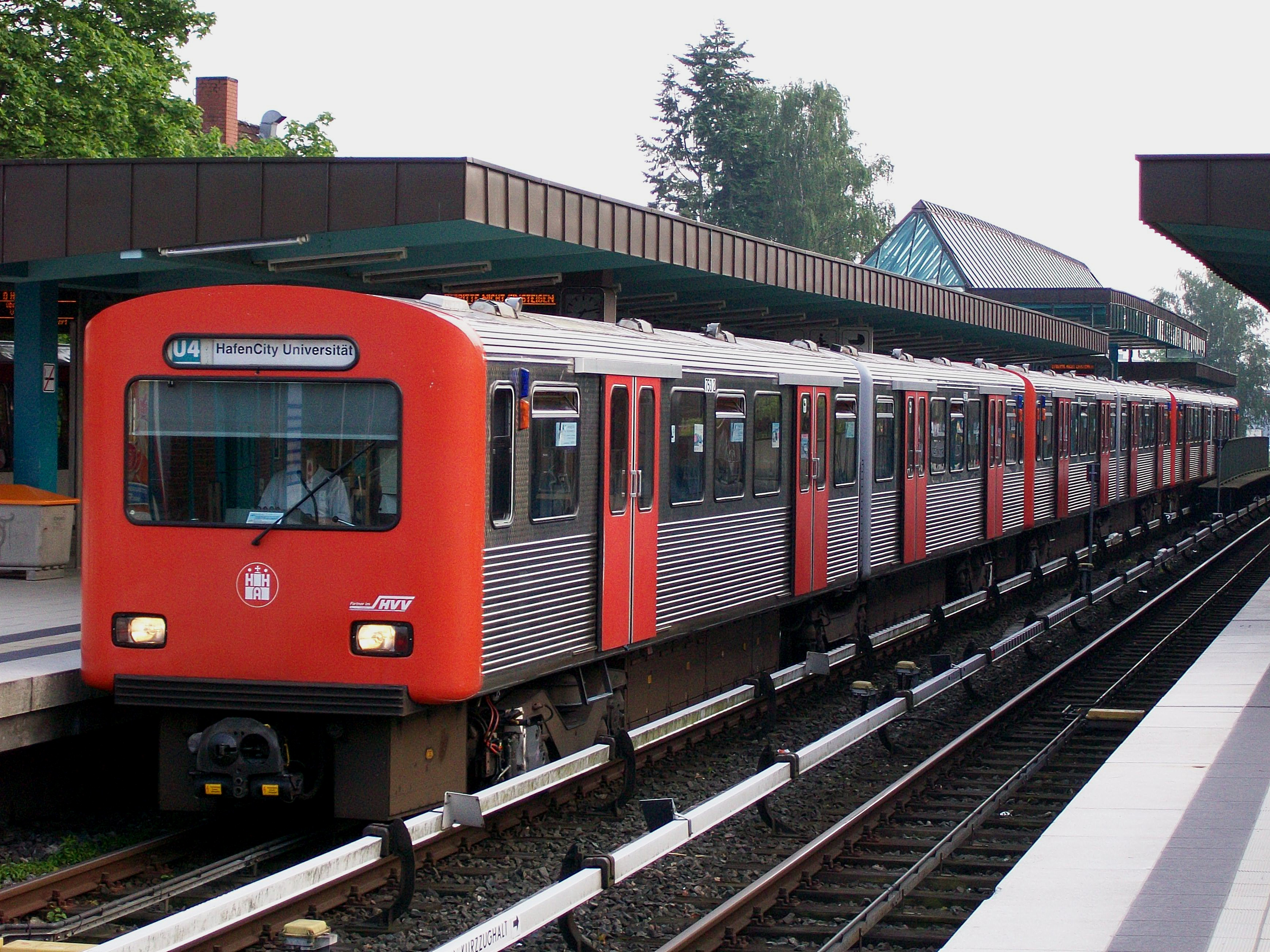
Type DT2E (rebuilt), retired in 2015

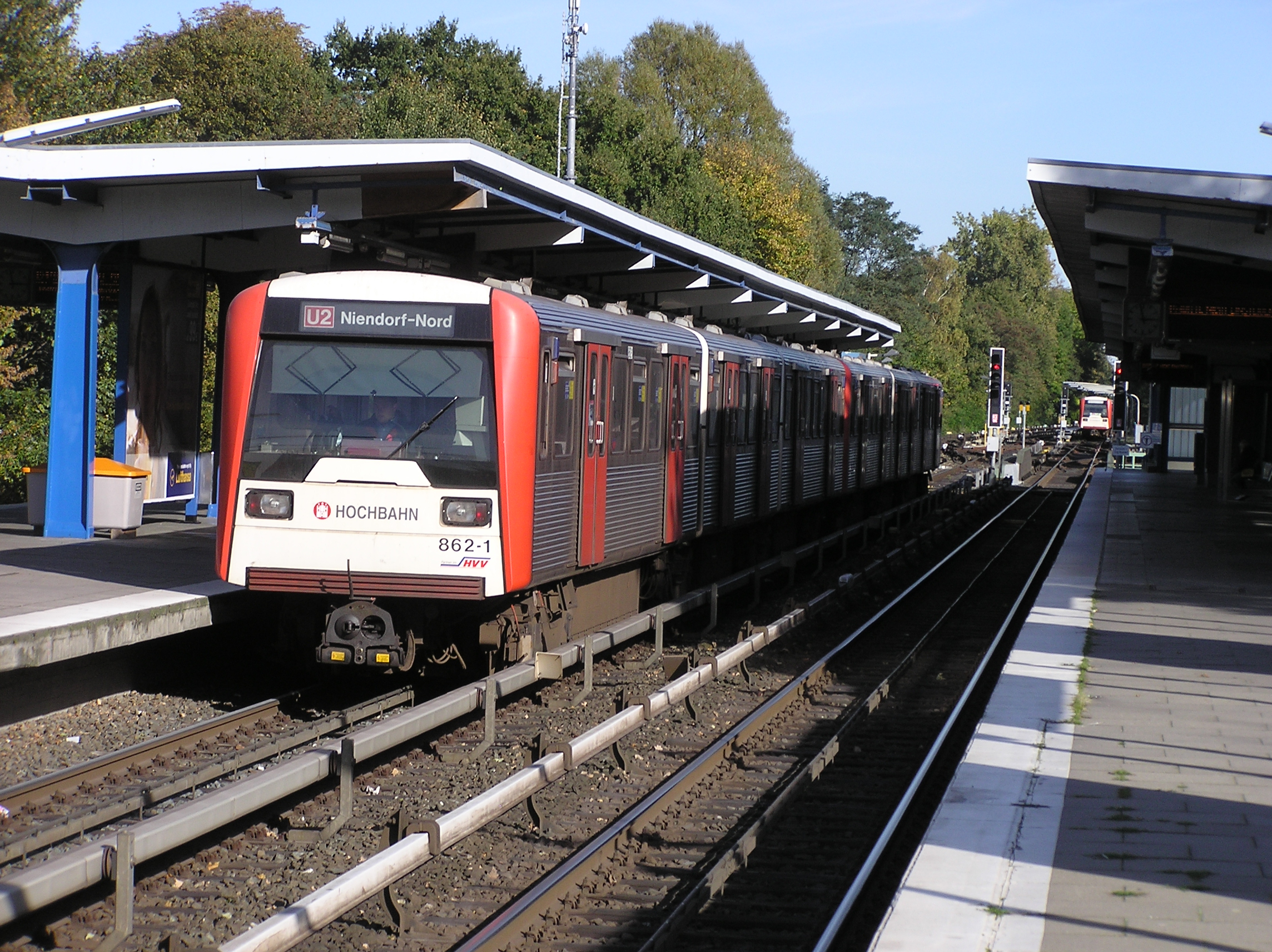
Type DT3N (rebuilt), retired in 2023

== Network Maps ==
Network map (2026)

== See also ==
- List of Hamburg U-Bahn stations
- Hamburg S-Bahn
- AKN railways plc
- Public transport in Hamburg
- Rail transport in Germany
