= Hamburg U-Bahn Type DT4 =

German U-Bahn train type operated in Hamburg

HHA-Baureihe DT4
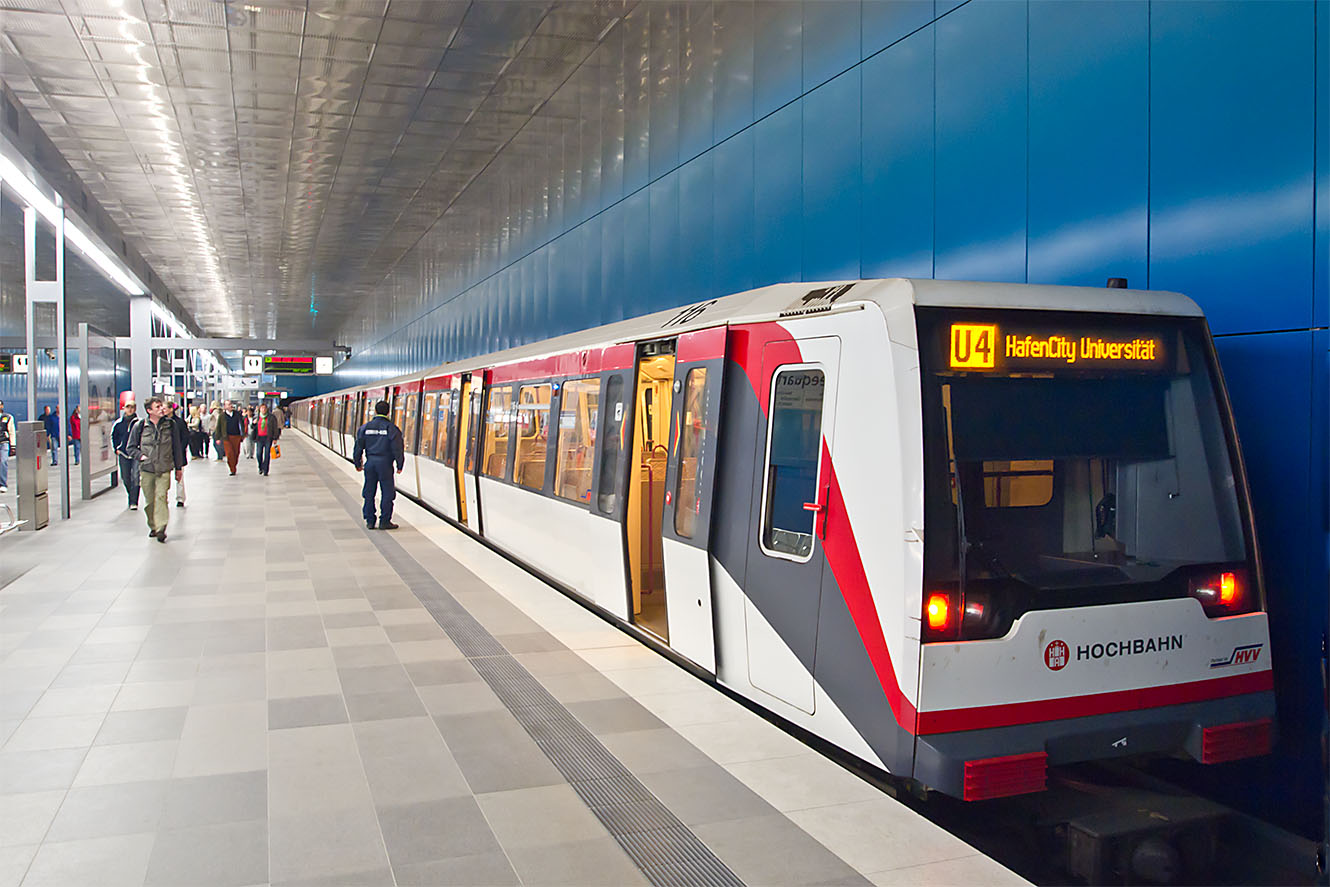
- A DT4 train at Überseequartier station in May 2013
- In service: 1989–present
- Manufacturers: LHB, ABB
- Constructed: 1988 - 2005
- Refurbished: 2011–
- Number built: 126 units
- Number in service: 125 units
- Fleet numbers: 101–226
- Capacity: 182 seated
- Operator: Hamburger Hochbahn AG
- Depots: Farmsen, Barmbek, Billstedt
- Line served: U1, U2, U4

Specifications
- Train length: 60.28 m (197 ft 9 in)
- Width: 2.58 m (8 ft 6 in)
- Height: 3.32 m (10 ft 11 in)
- Doors: 2 pairs per side (per car)
- Maximum speed: 80 km/h (50 mph)
- Weight: 76.8 t (75.6 long tons; 84.7 short tons)
- Traction system: DT4.1 - DT4.5: ABB/ADTranz GTO–VVVF DT4.6 - DT4.11: ABB IGBT–VVVF
- Power output: 1,000 kW (1,340 hp)
- Electric system: 750 V DC third rail
- Current collection: Contact shoe
- UIC classification: Bo′2′Bo′+Bo′2′Bo′
- Braking systems: Dynamic main brakes, automatic air brakes
- Safety system: Sifa
- Track gauge: 1,435 mm (4 ft 8 1/2 in)

The Type DT4 is a four-car electric multiple unit (EMU) train type operated by the Hamburger Hochbahn AG on the Hamburg U-Bahn system since 1988.

== Formation ==
Every DT4 unit consists of four cars, which are formed as two articulated half-sets with two cars each. The cars don't have gangways, but feature windows in the car ends.

== Interior ==
The interior consists of transverse seating bays. Widescreen passenger information displays are to be fitted to the whole DT4 fleet, with works scheduled to be completed in 2022.

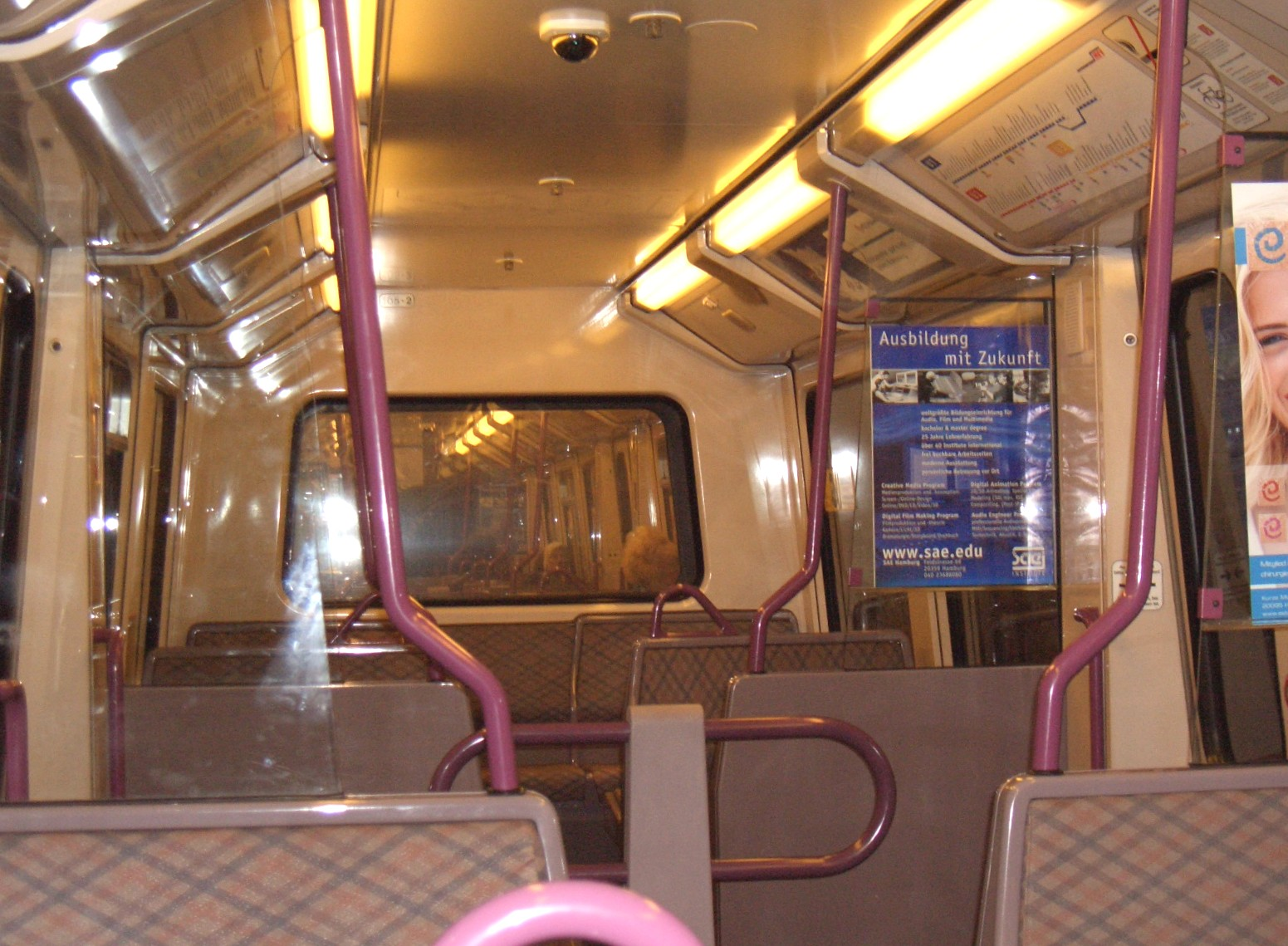
Interior view DT4.1 and DT4.2

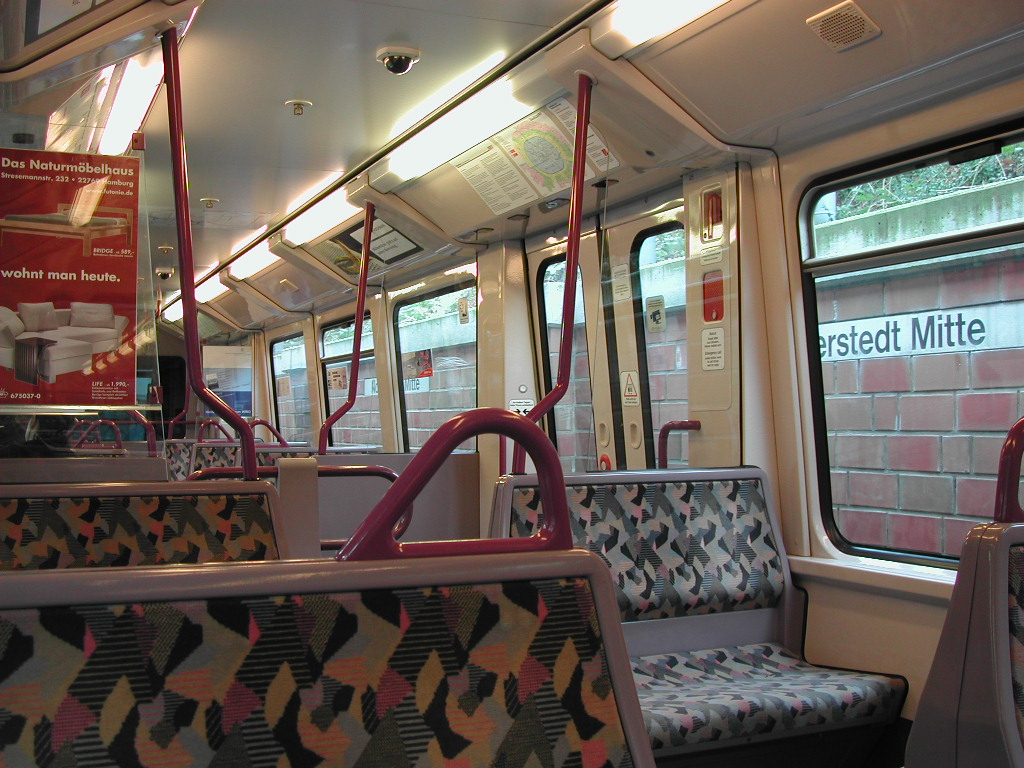
Interior view DT4.3 and DT4.4

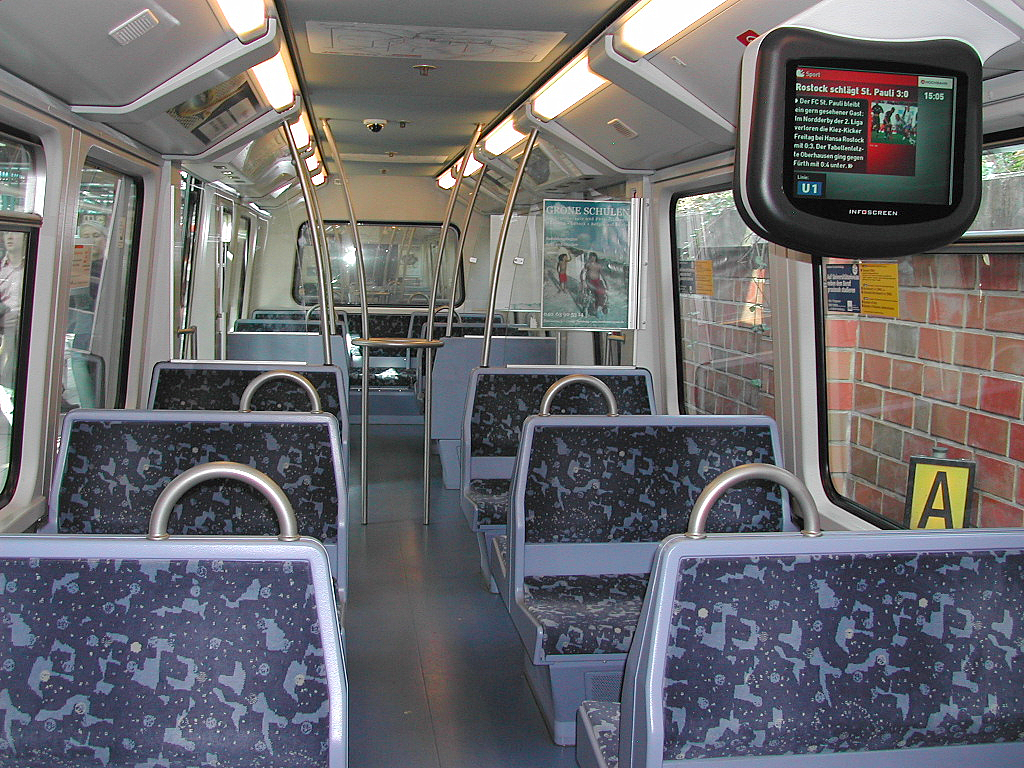
Interior with passenger information display in September 2008

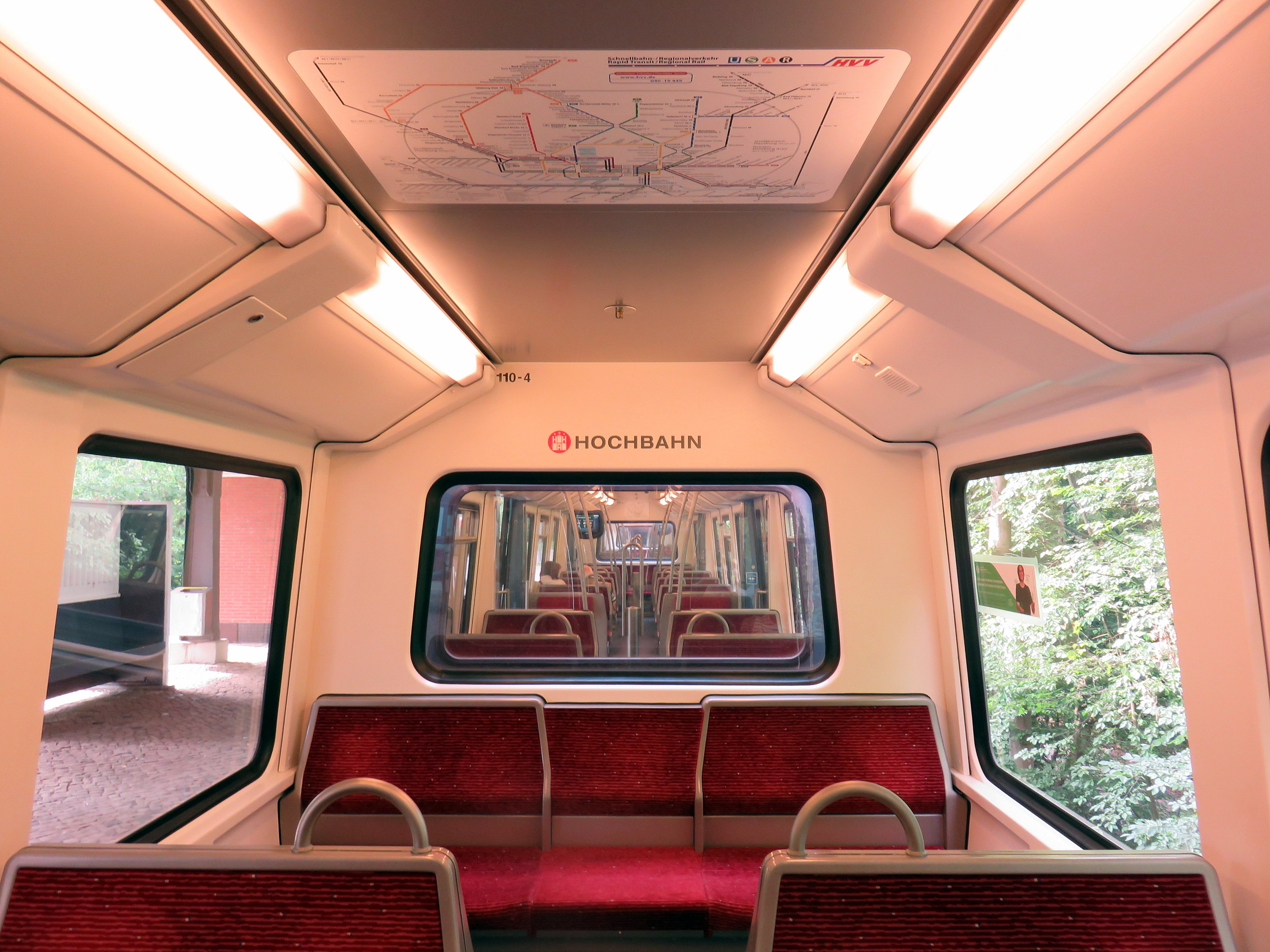
Interior of a refurbished train in August 2015

== Technical specifications ==
The trains have steel car bodies and a three-phase propulsion system. Thyristor inverters are used in the DT4.1 and DT4.2 trains, and the DT4.3 through DT4.5 trains use GTO-pulse inverters. The DT4.56 and DT4.6 trains use IGBT-pulse inverters.

Each four-car set has four powered bogies and two non-motored bogies. The powered bogies are equipped with water cooled three-phase asynchronous motors.

== History ==
The development of the DT4 began in 1986, and the first unit was completed on May 30, 1988. Passenger service began on October 17 of the same year.

The DT4 trains are being refurbished since 2011. They receive a newer interior appearance, similar to the interior of the DT5 trains. One car of set 140 was refurbished for testing purposes in summer 2010. Regular refurbishment started in 2011.
