= Eidelstedt station =

Railway station in Hamburg, Germany

Coordinates: 53°35′45″N 9°54′24″E

Eidelstedt
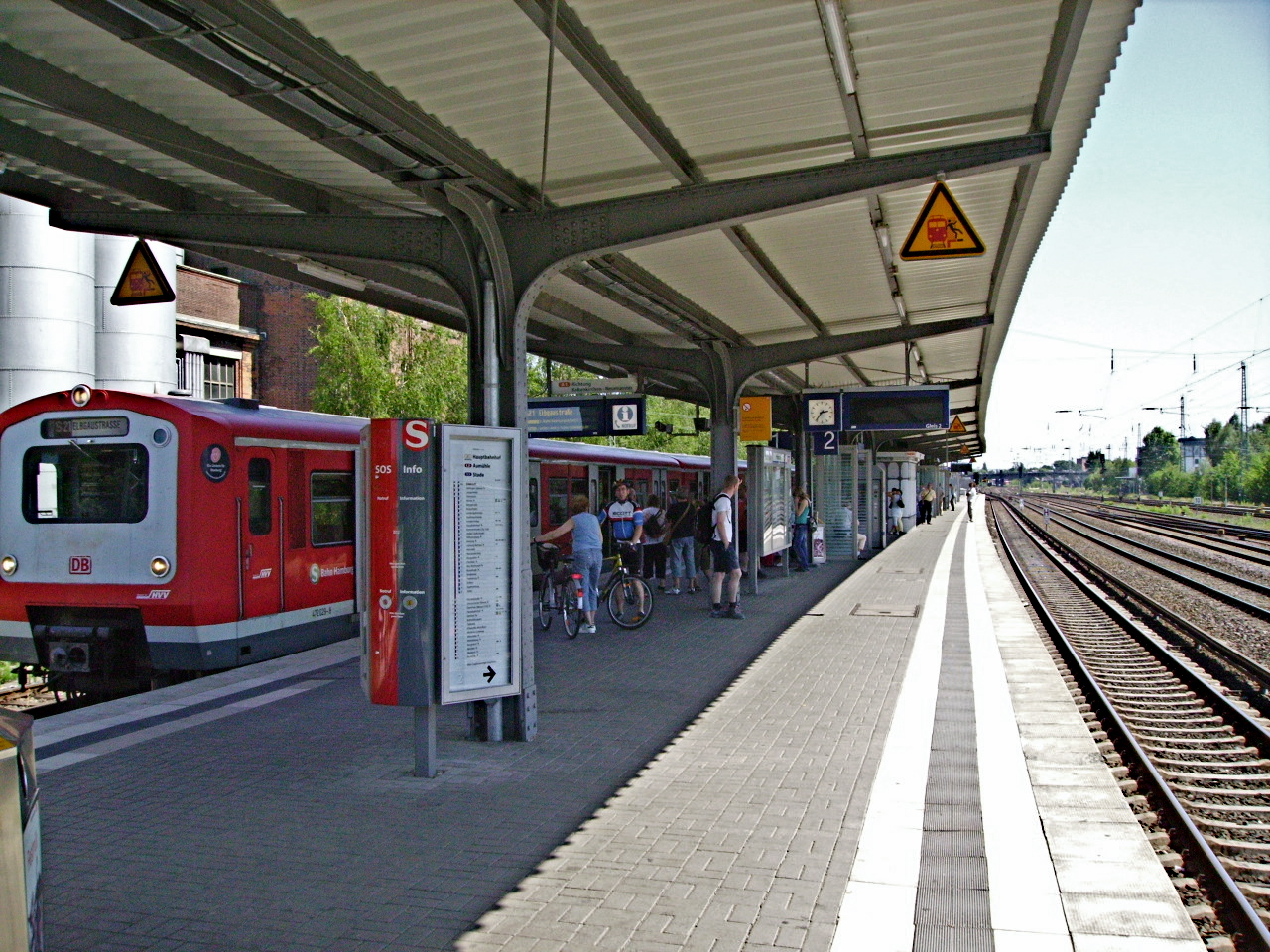
- Eidelstedt railway station, S-Bahn, platform

General information
- Other names: Hamburg-Eidelstedt
- Location: Reichsbahnstr. 101; 22525 Hamburg; Germany
- Operator: Hamburg Vekehrsbund
- Lines: AKN railway plc. A1
- Platforms: 2
- Tracks: 2
- Connections: Bus

Construction
- Structure type: Elevated
- Parking: 20 parking lots
- Cycle facilities: 20 bicycle stands
- Accessible: Yes

Other information
- Station code: ds100: AEST; DB station code: 1511; Type: Bf; Category: 4
- Fare zone: HVV: A/201 and 203

History
- Opened: 18 September 1844; 181 years ago
- Electrified: 25 September 1965; 60 years ago, 1200 volts DC system
- Former names: 1844-1930 Eidelstedt; 1930-1938 Altona-Eidelstedt; 1938 to date Hamburg-Eidelstedt

Services
Preceding station	Hamburg S-Bahn	Following station
Elbgaustraße towards Pinneberg	S3	Stellingen towards Hamburg-Neugraben
Elbgaustraße Terminus	S5	Stellingen towards Stade
Preceding station		Following station
Eidelstedt Zentrum towards Ulzburg Süd	A1	Terminus
Location
- Location within Hamburg Location within Schleswig-Holstein Location within Germany Location within Europe

Eidelstedt railway station is on the Hamburg-Altona–Kiel line and is served by the city trains and the commuter trains of the AKN railways plc., located in Hamburg, Germany.

The railway station is located in the quarter of Eidelstedt in the Eimsbüttel borough.

== Station layout ==
The station is an elevated island platform with 2 tracks and one exit. The station is fully accessible for handicapped persons, because there is a lift and a special floor layout for blind persons.

== Station services ==
=== Trains ===
The commuter trains of the line A1are calling Eidelstedt as a terminus. The rapid transit trains of the lines S3 and S5 of the Hamburg S-Bahn are calling the station.

Direction of the trains on track 1 is toward Kaltenkirchen and Ulzburg Süd (A1), Pinneberg (S3) and Elbgaustraße railway station (S5). On track 2 the trains are running in the direction Neugraben (S3) and Stade (S5).

=== Facilities at the station ===
A small shop in the station sells fast food and newspapers. There are no lockerboxes. No personnel is attending the station, but there are SOS and information telephones, ticket machines, 20 bicycle stands and 20 parking lots.

== See also ==
- Hamburger Verkehrsverbund (HVV)
