= Alster Northern Railway =

Railway line in Northern Germany

Overview
- Native name: Alsternordbahn
- Line number: 9122
- Locale: Hamburg and Schleswig-Holstein, Germany

Service
- Route number: 138 (HVV: A2)

Technical
- Line length: 7.7 km (4.8 mi)
- Track gauge: 1,435 mm (4 ft 8 1/2 in) standard gauge
- Electrification: (Norderstedt Mitte – Ochsenzoll: third rail, 750 V

The Alster Northern Railway (German: Alsternordbahn) or ANB was a non-electrified, single-tracked branch line in northern Germany. It linked the stations of Ochsenzoll in Hamburg-Langenhorn with Ulzburg Süd in the district of Segeberg in Schleswig-Holstein.

The northern part of the route to Norderstedt Mitte is used today by AKN Railway on behalf to VGN Norderstedt (HVV Line A 2) and is mostly double-tracked. Since 1996 the southern section is part of the Hamburg U-Bahn network (Line U 1) on behalf to VGN. It is doubled throughout and electrified at 750 V DC via a third rail.

The description Alster Northern Railway (Alsternordbahn) is still commonly used for this route. The name originates from the river Alster which flows into the river Elbe in Hamburg.

== History ==
The proposal for an Alster Northern Railway was put forward by the civil engineer Heinrich Lönnies ("The Lion of Norderstedt") to implement the axis concept that the Hamburg architect and urban designer Fritz Schumacher had introduced in the 1920s. This provided for the Langenhorn–Kaltenkirchen area to be developed as an extension of the axis formed by the Hamburg U-Bahn line, which was operated by the Hamburger Hochbahn, but only as far as Ochsenzoll. There was no connecting line from there to Ulzburg and Henstedt (now Henstedt-Ulzburg).

The Alster Northern Railway was opened on 17 May 1953. Though it was initially planned as a simple tramway or the like, it was built as a standard gauge light railway to EBO standards and was thus the first newly built railway line in the Federal Republic of Germany. The tracks were, and are, only attached to the north to the Hamburg-Altona–Neumünster railway (AKN) at Ulzburg Süd. In Ochsenzoll there was neither a connection to the now closed Deutsche Bundesbahn freight railway to Ohlsdorf nor to the U-Bahn tracks.

The line was managed from the beginning by the AKN and it also supplied the staff.

It was initially (until 1967) operated with new battery electric multiple units from MaK and from 1956 with MAN railbuses. From the outset, the railcars were equipped with FM radio facilities. This was the first VHF train radio in Germany. The few passing places on the single track line were fitted at that time with relapse switches, so that a low-cost train control system could be carried out with little manpower.

In 1981, the ANB was taken over by the AKN, which had already supplied rolling stock from 1977 onwards, and the ANB sold its rolling stock in the same year. Meanwhile, the line — now called the A 2 by Hamburger Verkehrsverbund (Hamburg Transport Association) — was shortened with the gradual extension of the U-Bahn line U 1 to Garstedt in 1969 and to Norderstedt Mitte in 1996. The line was duplicated between 1992 and 1996, using the Norderstedt industrial railway (Norderstedter Industriebahn, NIB) which had run parallel to the main line between Ulzburg Süd and Friedrichsgabe since 1973, and now ends as a single track in Norderstedt Mitte station (opened in 1996), where there is a cross-platform transfer to the U-Bahn.

In 1992, the infrastructure was transferred to Verkehrsgesellschaft Norderstedt (Norderstedt transport company, VGN), a subsidiary of Stadtwerke Norderstedt, the Norderstedt municipal utility. AKN continues to operate traffic on the A 2 line with diesel-electric two-car multiple units (LHB VTA), with four DMUs being the property of VGN.

Freight has operated only since 20 October 1971 and only on the northern part of the line, since the connection from the Hamburgische Electricitäts-Werke (Hamburg Electricity Works) was put into operation. Since 1 January 2004, it has been operated by DB Schenker Rail.

== Current operations ==
Today, the passenger traffic on the (northern) Alster Northern Railway is operated by the AKN as line A 2. Trains generally run daily between 5 am and 1 am every 20 minutes. Services are thinned out after 11 pm and on Sundays to every 40 minutes. In the Monday-to-Friday peaks between 6 am and 9 am and between 4 pm and 6 pm there is a 10-minute interval service. There is a night service on weekends.

== Photos ==
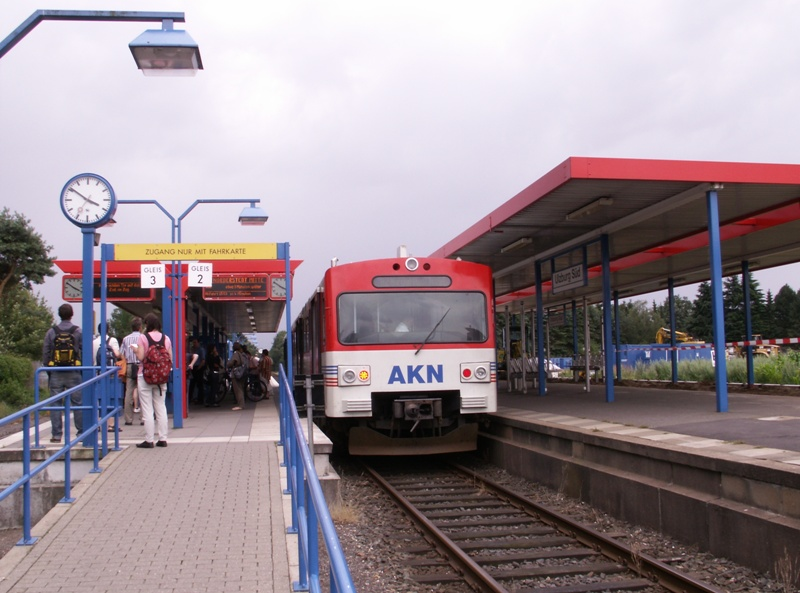
Ulzburg Süd station, track-level connections on both sides between the A 2 and A 1 (+ A 3)

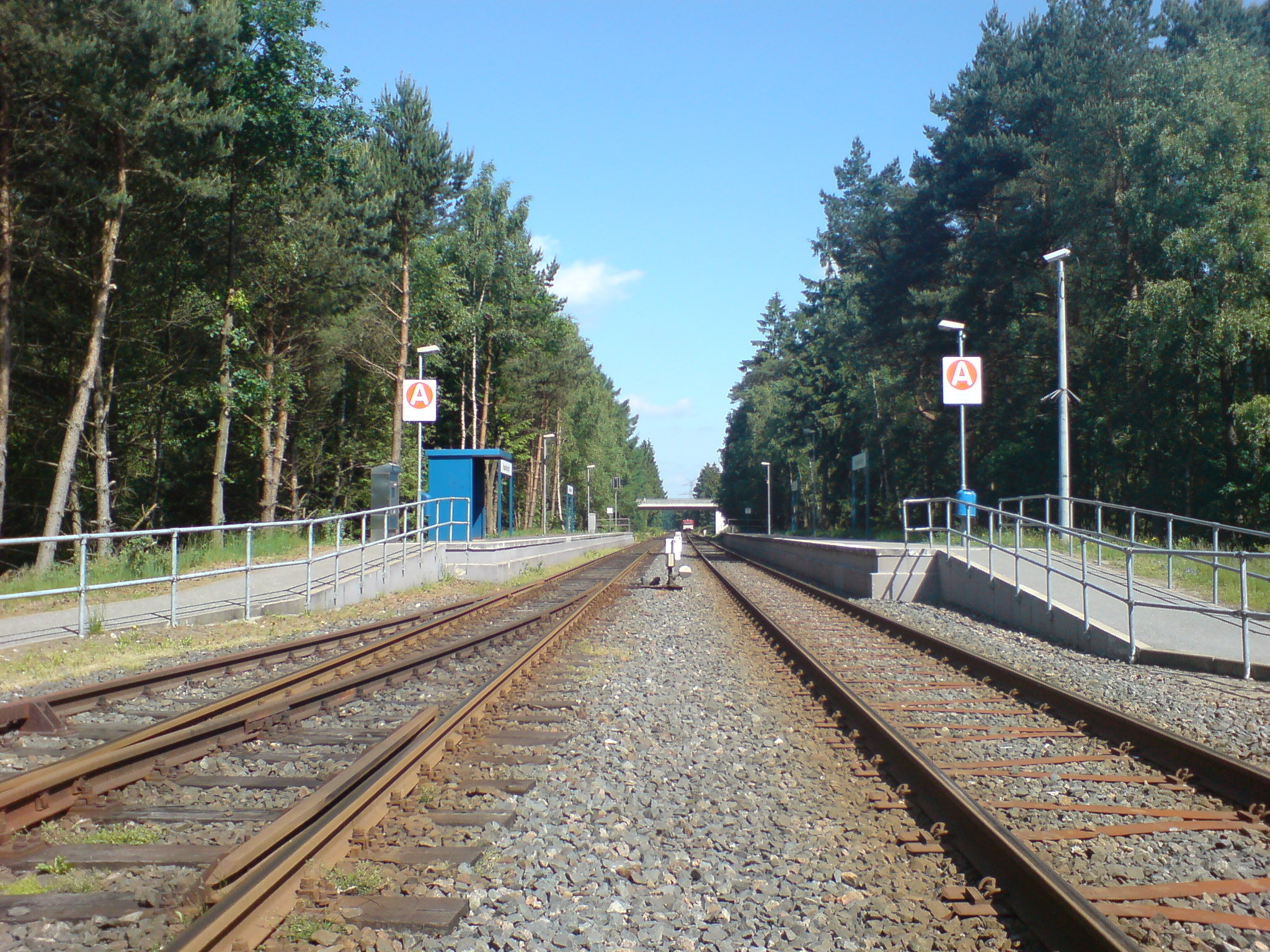
Haslohfurth halt (A 2)

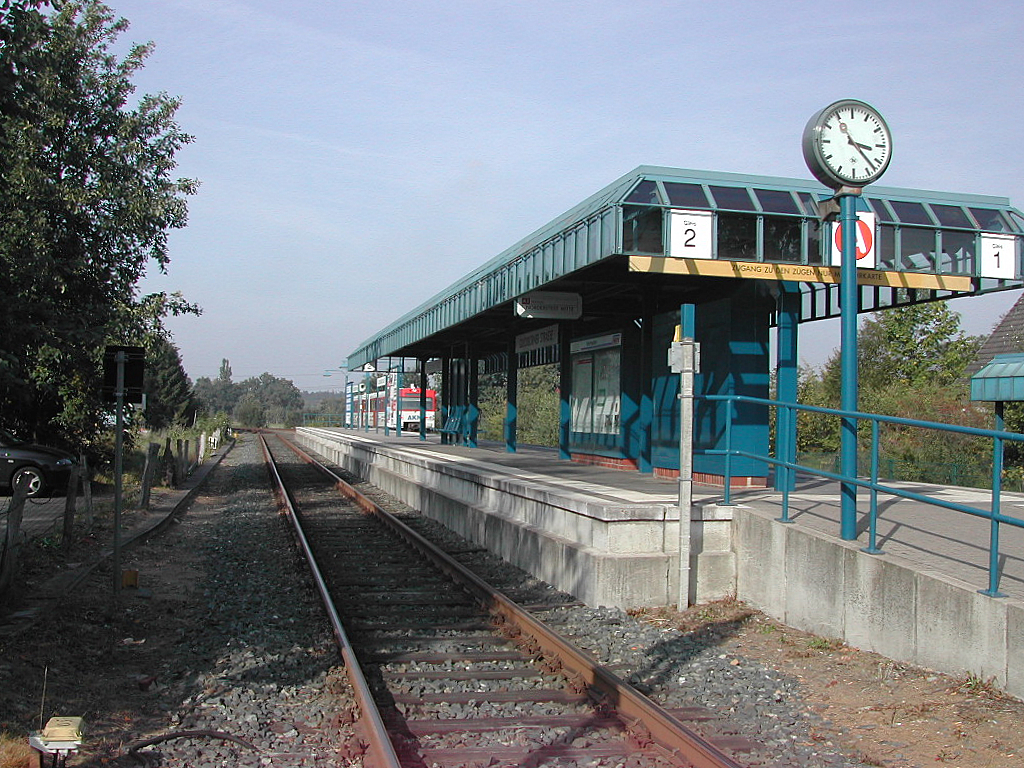
Quickborner Straße station (A 2)

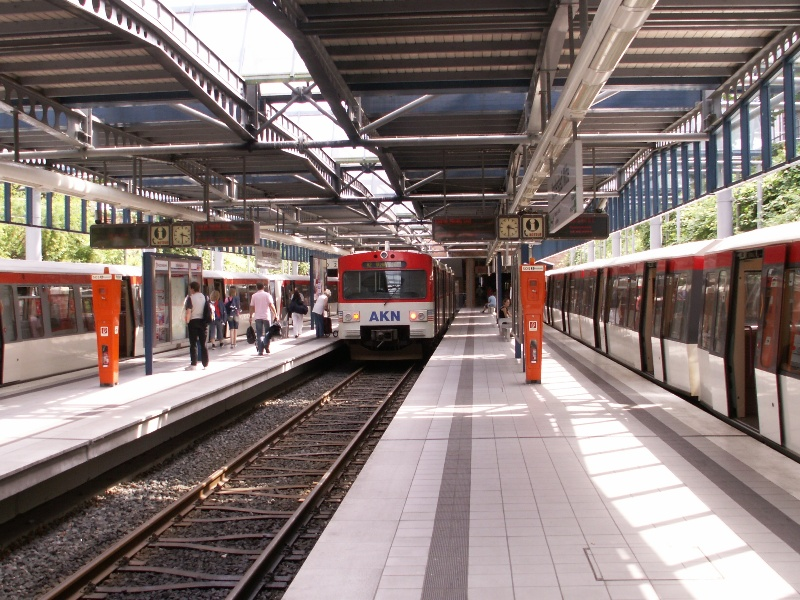
Norderstedt Mitte station, in the centre the A 2; left and right the underground (U 1)
