= Eidelstedt =

- Quarter of Hamburg
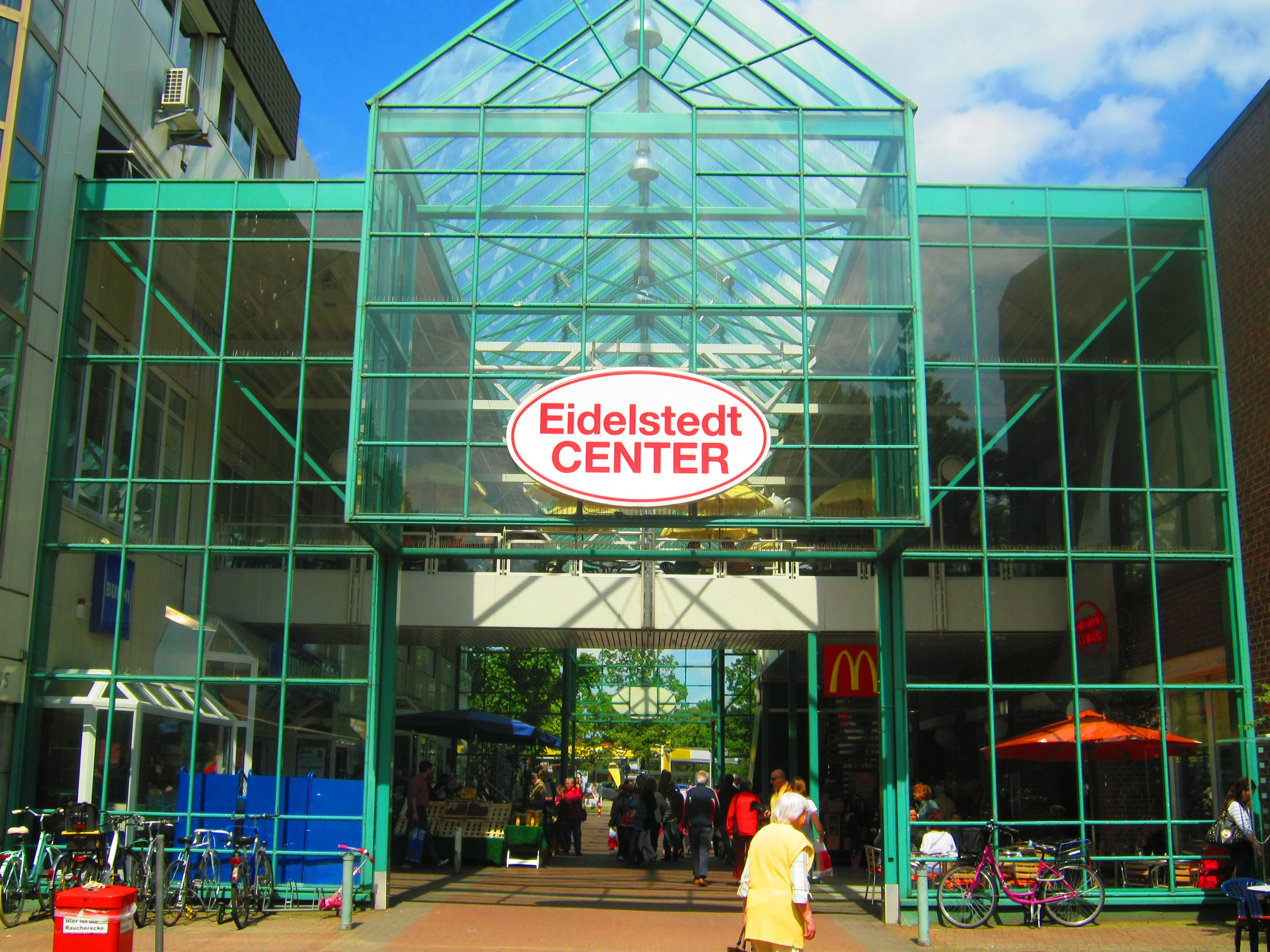
- Shopping arcades in the center of Eidelstedt

- Location of Eidelstedt in Hamburg
- Interactive map of Eidelstedt
- Location within Germany Location within Hamburg
- Coordinates: 53.60707°N 9.90622°E
- Country: Germany
- State: Hamburg
- City: Hamburg
- Borough: Hamburg-Eimsbüttel

Area
  - Total: 8.7 km^{2} (3.4 sq mi)

Population (2024-12-31)
  - Total: 36,705
  - Density: 4,200/km^{2} (11,000/sq mi)
- Time zone: UTC+01:00 (CET)
  - Summer (DST): UTC+02:00 (CEST)
- Dialling codes: 040
- Vehicle registration: HH

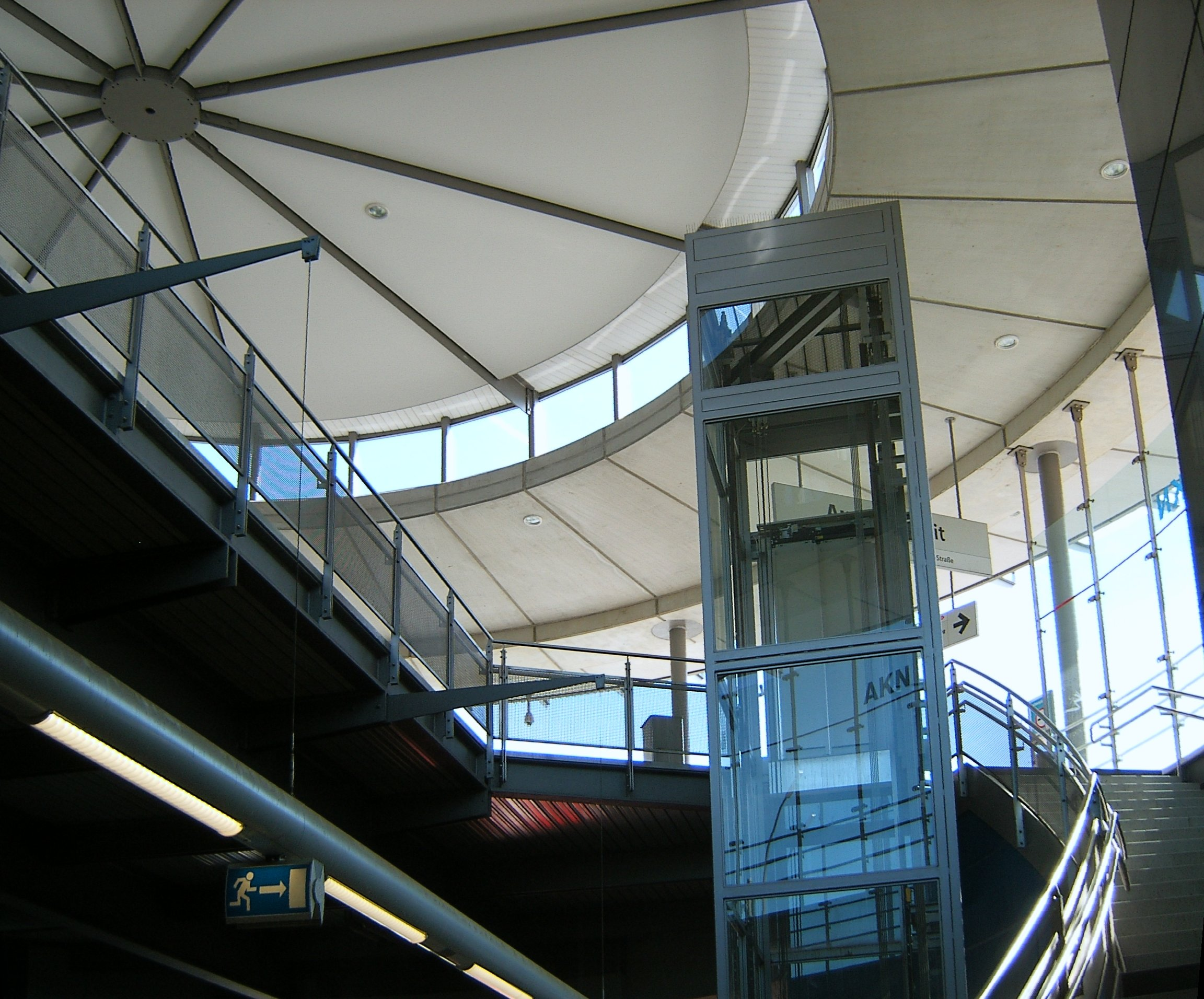
AKN station of Eidelstedt Zentrum

Eidelstedt (German pronunciation: [ˈaɪdl̩ˌʃtɛt]) is a quarter of Hamburg, Germany, in the borough of Eimsbüttel. It is located on the northwestern boundaries of the borough and of the city.

== Geography ==
Eidelstedt borders the quarters of Schnelsen, Niendorf, Stellingen, as well as Bahrenfeld and Lurup in the neighbouring Altona borough.

== History ==
In 1266/69 Eidelstedt was first recorded as a village, then under the names of Eilstede, Eylstedt or Eylenstede. The part -stedt in the name refers to a Saxonian foundation, meaning safe settlement or safe residence, which was founded by a first settler named Eyler. Another explanation derives from Ilenstätten, referring to a place (German: Stätte), where medicinal leeches (German: Egel, Blutegel, Low German: Ilen) could be found, namely in a stream called Mühlenau and the pond of Mühlenteich in the village. In 1937, the village was incorporated into Hamburg by the Greater Hamburg Act, which came into force in 1938.

== Politics ==
Election	SPD	Greens	CDU	Left	AfD	FDP	Others
2020	45.7 %	18.6 %	10.6 %	8.9 %	7.6 %	2.9 %	5.7 %
2015	54.1 %	8,4 %	13.9 %	7.3 %	7.5 %	4.9 %	3.2 %
2011	55.9 %	8.1 %	20.2 %	6.4 %	–	4.5 %	4.9 %
2008	38.3 %	6.3 %	41.7 %	6.7 %	–	4.1 %	2.8 %
2004	35.4 %	7.3 %	46.7 %	–	–	2.5 %	8.2 %

== Transportation ==
The Hamburg-Altona–Kiel railway marks the south western boundaries of the quarter, with Hamburg S-Bahn commuter trains serve Elbgaustraße and Eidelstedt station; the latter is also served by AKN commuter trains. AKN railcars also call Eidelstedt Zentrum station.
