= Langenfelde station =

Railway station in Hamburg, Germany

Coordinates: 53°34′46″N 9°55′51″E

Langenfelde
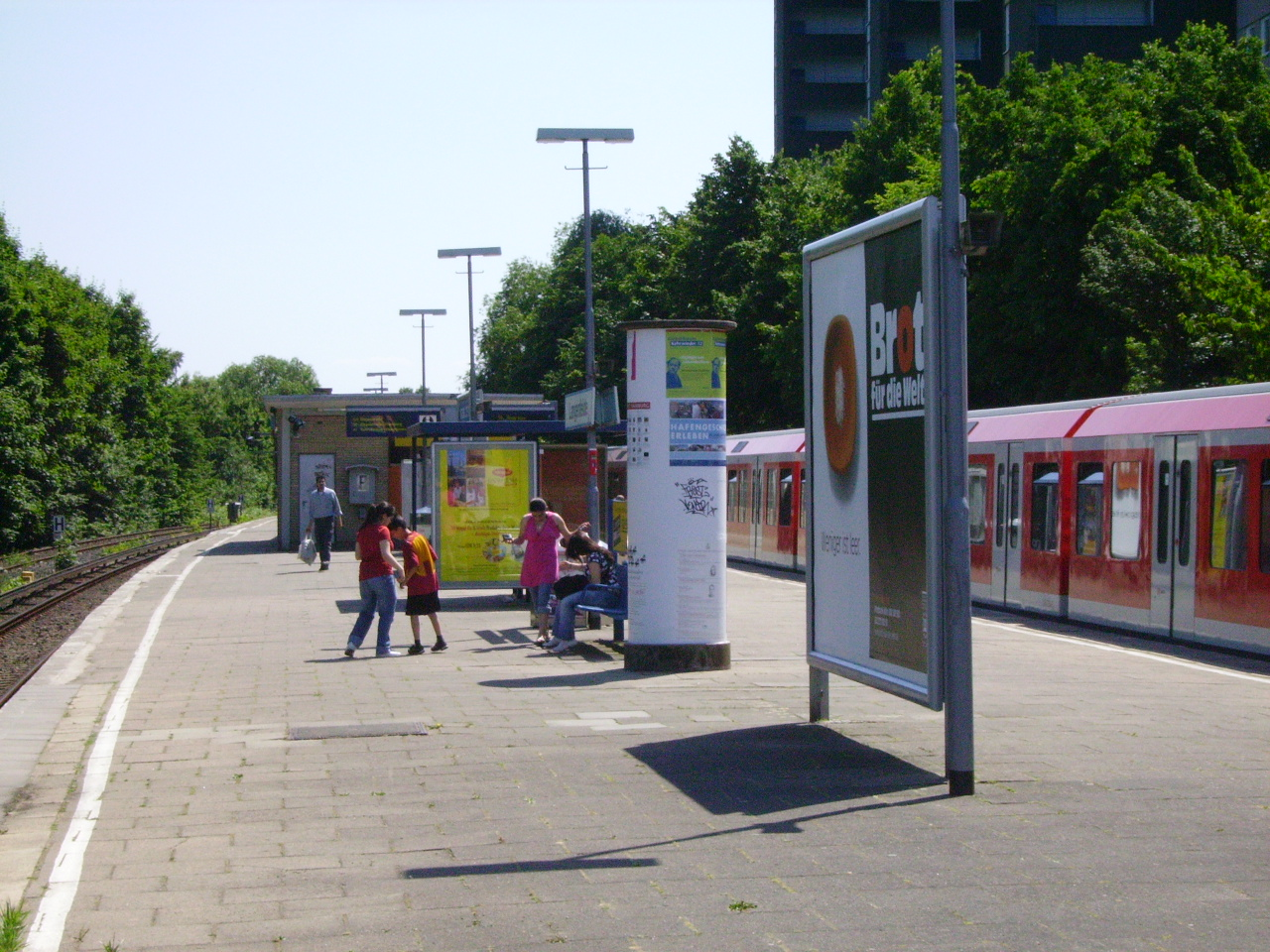
- Langenfelde station (incoming train on track 2)

General information
- Location: Försterweg 22; 22525 Hamburg; Germany
- Line: S3 S5
- Platforms: 2 (island platform)
- Tracks: 2

Construction
- Structure type: Elevated
- Parking: No
- Cycle facilities: Yes
- Accessible: Yes

Other information
- Station code: ds100: ALST; DB station code: 3537; Type: Hp; Category: 4
- Fare zone: HVV: A/101

History
- Opened: 8 September 1884; 141 years ago
- Electrified: 22 February 1962; 64 years ago, 3rd rail 1200 V DC system

Key dates
- 1911–1962: no stopping

Services
| Preceding station | Hamburg S-Bahn | Following station |
|---|---|---|
| Stellingen towards Pinneberg | S3 | Diebsteich towards Hamburg-Neugraben |
| Stellingen towards Elbgaustraße | S5 | Diebsteich towards Stade |
Location
- Location within Hamburg Location within Schleswig-Holstein Location within Germany Location within Europe

Langenfelde railway station is on the Altona–Kiel and the Altona–Neumünster lines and is served by the city trains. The station is named after the Langenfelde suburb. It is located in the Stellingen quarter in the Hamburg borough of Eimsbüttel, Germany. The station is managed by the DB Station&Service plc. for the public transport operator of Hamburg (Hamburger Verkehrsverbund (HVV)).

== History ==
After 1879, when Nothnagel & Co. promoted the idea to build a railway line to transport peat to Altona, the Altona Kaltenkirchen Railway Company was founded, today's Altona Kaltenkirchen Neumünster Railway Company and in 1883 works started for the Hamburg-Altona–Neumünster railway line. On 8 September 1884 passenger traffic was opened. However, between 1911 and 1912, when the line at grade was elevated onto a railway embankment in order to stop hindrances by level crossings, Langenfelde was given up as a stop. With AKN ceding the section of the Altona-Neumünster line between Altona and Eidelstedt to the Deutsche Bundesbahn the latter redeveloped the stations in this section into S-Bahn stations, and reopened Langenfelde station in 1962.

== Station layout ==
The station is an elevated island platform with two tracks and one exit. A lift was added recently.

== Station services ==
=== Trains ===
The rapid transit trains of the Hamburg S-Bahn lines S3 and S5 call at the station.

Direction of the trains on track 1 is northbound toward Elbgaustraße (S5), and Pinneberg (S3). On track 2 the trains run southbound in the direction Stade via Holstenstraße (S5) and Neugraben via Altona (S3).

=== Facilities at the station ===
A small shop in the station sells fast food and newspapers. Another shop sells bakery products, as well as Turkish take away food. There are no lockerboxes. Expectedly in course of April 2011 a newly installed lift will provide full access also for handicapped people. No personnel are attending the station, but there are SOS and information telephones, ticket machines and bicycle stands.
