= Kaltenkirchen station =

Railway station in Germany

Kaltenkirchen
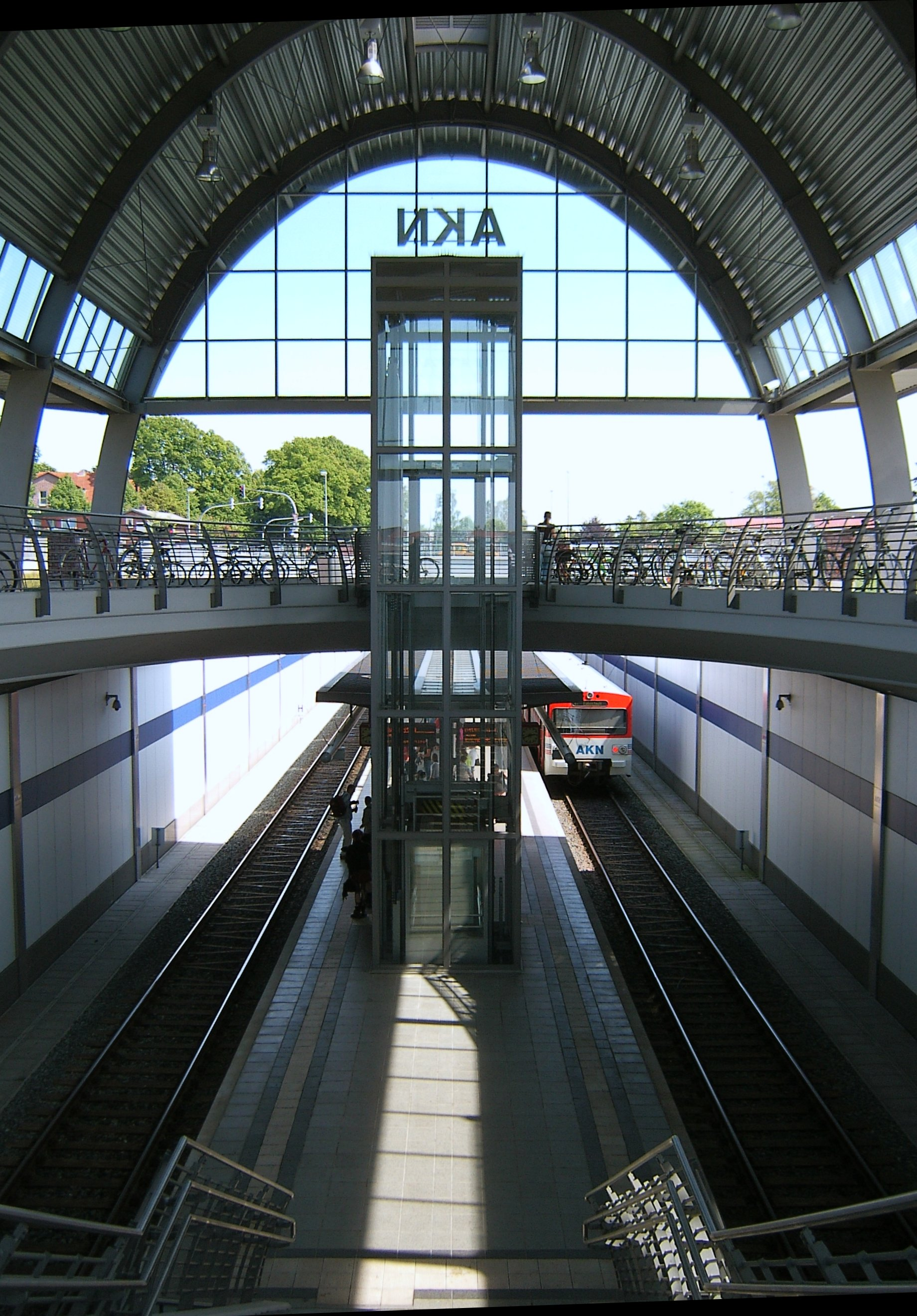

General information
- Location: Am Bahnhof 10; 24568 Kaltenkirchen, Germany
- Coordinates: 53°50′04″N 9°57′58″E
- System: HVV rapid transit station
- Operator: AKN Eisenbahn AG
- Line: A1 A2
- Platforms: 1 island platforms
- Tracks: 2
- Connections: Bus, Taxi

Construction
- Structure type: underground
- Parking: Park and Ride (244 slots)
- Accessible: Yes

Other information
- Fare zone: HVV: C and D/614 and 703

History
- Opened: 8 September 1884
- Rebuilt: 3 September 2004
- Electrified

Services
Preceding station		Following station
Holstentherme towards Ulzburg Süd	A1	Kaltenkirchen Süd towards Hamburg-Eidelstedt
Terminus	A2	Kaltenkirchen Süd towards Norderstedt Mitte
Location
- Location within Schleswig-Holstein

Kaltenkirchen is a rapid transit station on the Hamburg-Altona–Neumünster railway line, located some 30 kilometres (19 miles) north of Hamburg, in the center of Kaltenkirchen, a town in the German state of Schleswig-Holstein.

== History ==
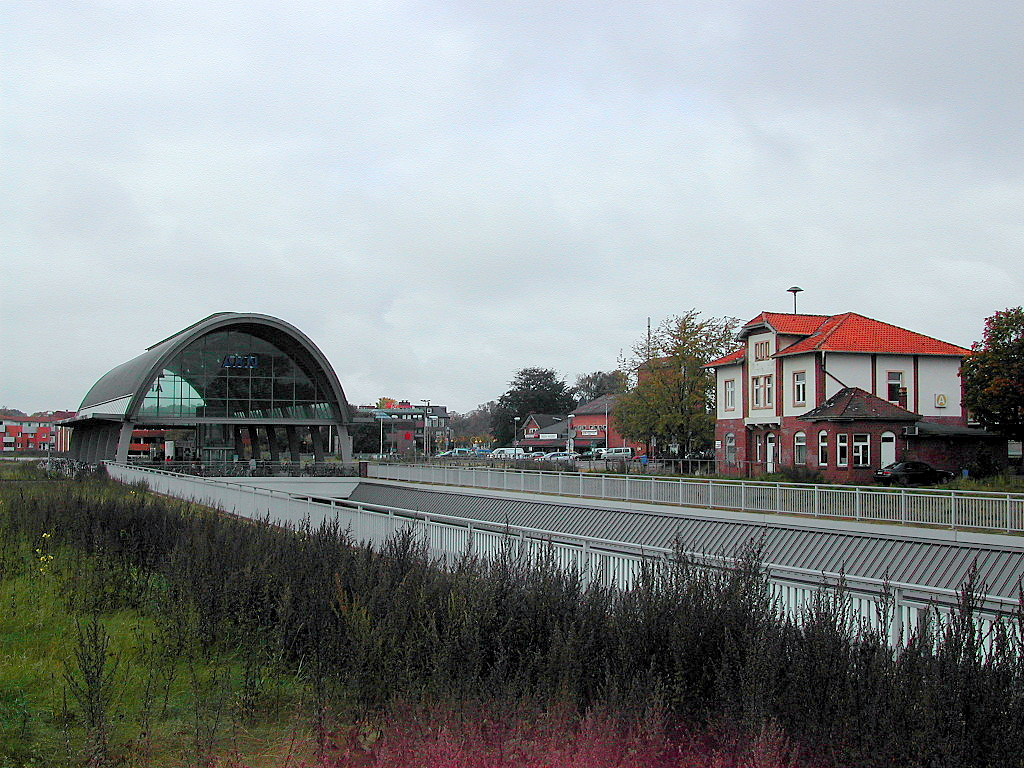
New (left) and old railway stations of Kaltenkirchen (2007).

Originally opened in 1884 and rebuilt in 2004, Kaltenkirchen is an integral part of AKN commuter rail, serving the Hamburg Metropolitan Region's North-west.

== Service ==
Kaltenkirchen is served by AKN Eisenbahn lines A1 and A2.

== See also ==
- Hamburger Verkehrsverbund (HVV)
- List of railway stations in Schleswig-Holstein
