= AKN Eisenbahn =

Railway company in Germany

- Type: Public
- Industry: rail transport
- Founded: 1883
- Headquarters: Kaltenkirchen, Germany
- Area served: Northern Germany
- Services: Transportation; Public transport
- Owner: Hamburg; Schleswig-Holstein; Quickborn; Sülfeld
- Number of employees: 292
- Subsidiaries: SHB Schleswig-Holstein-Bahn nordbahn Güterkraftverkehr Hamburg-Holstein
- Website: www.akn.de (in German)

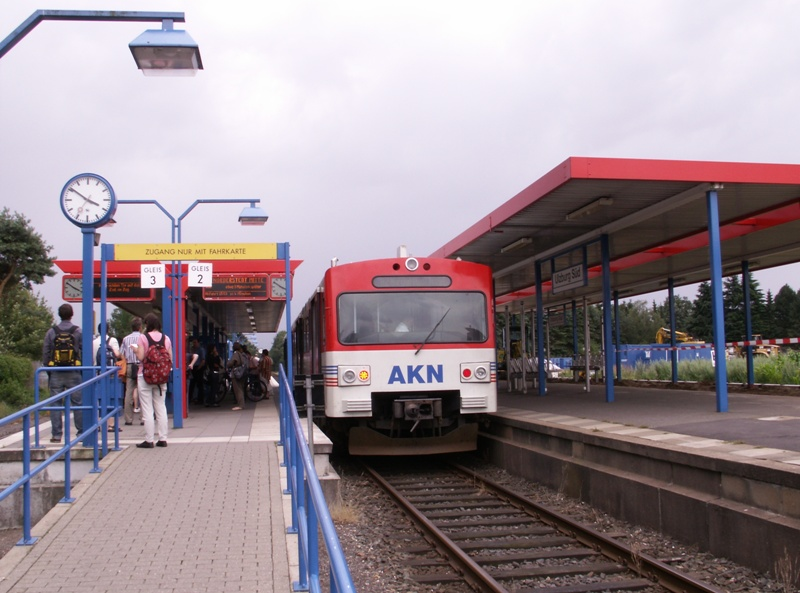
AKN train at Ulzburg Süd station

AKN Eisenbahn GmbH operates railway lines, commuter trains and freight trains in Hamburg and Schleswig-Holstein. Its headquarters is in Kaltenkirchen. It is a member of the Hamburger Verkehrsverbund (HVV), which organises public transport in and around Hamburg.

AKN is an abbreviation for Altona - Kaltenkirchen - Neumünster, its first railway line.

== Profile ==
Passengers are carried over a distance of about 265 km. About 120 km of this network is owned and operated by AKN.

It employed about 295 people in 2010.

AKN is a part of the Hamburger Verkehrsverbund (Hamburg Transport Association).

== History ==
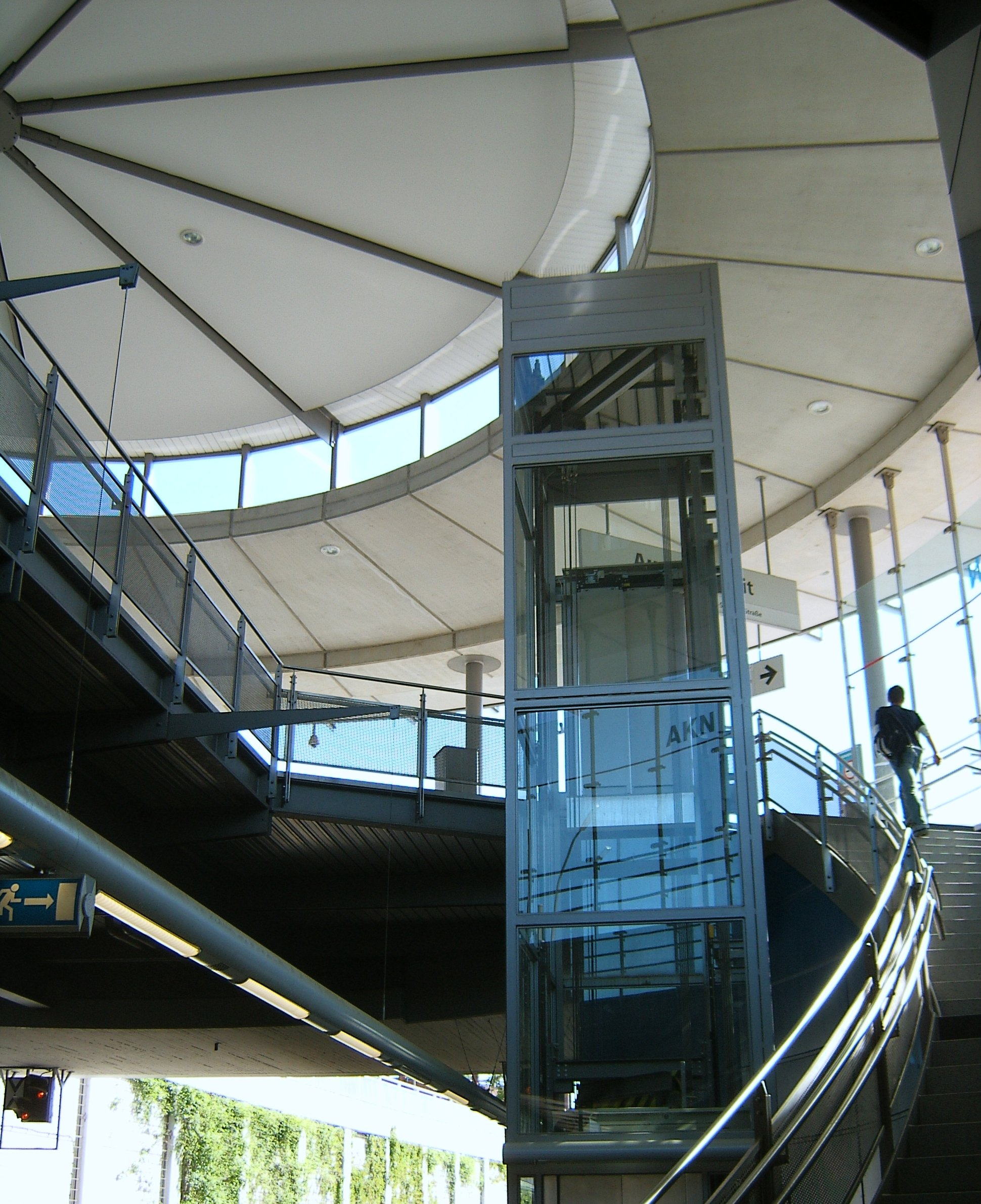
Entrance hall of Eidelstedt Zentrum station, interior

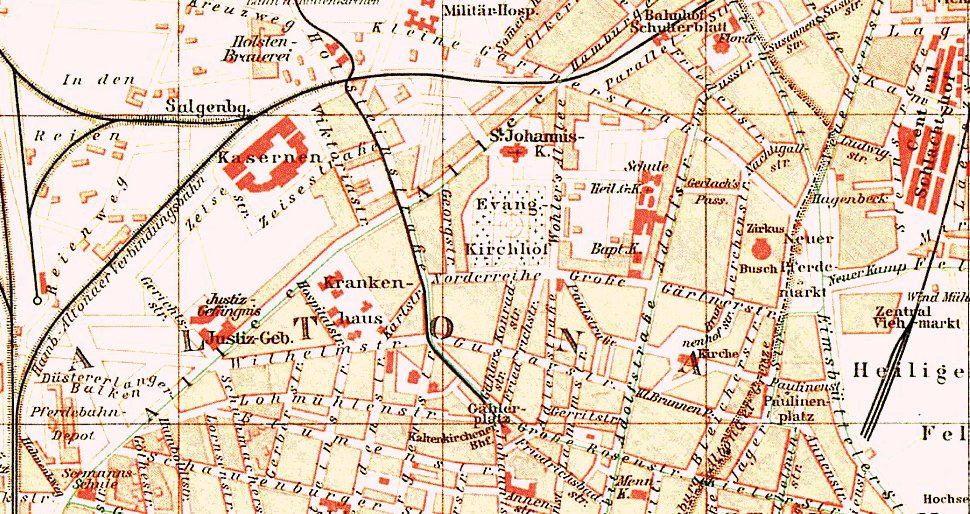
Kaltenkirchener Bahnhof at Gählerplatz in Altona from 1884 until 1893, map extract from about 1890

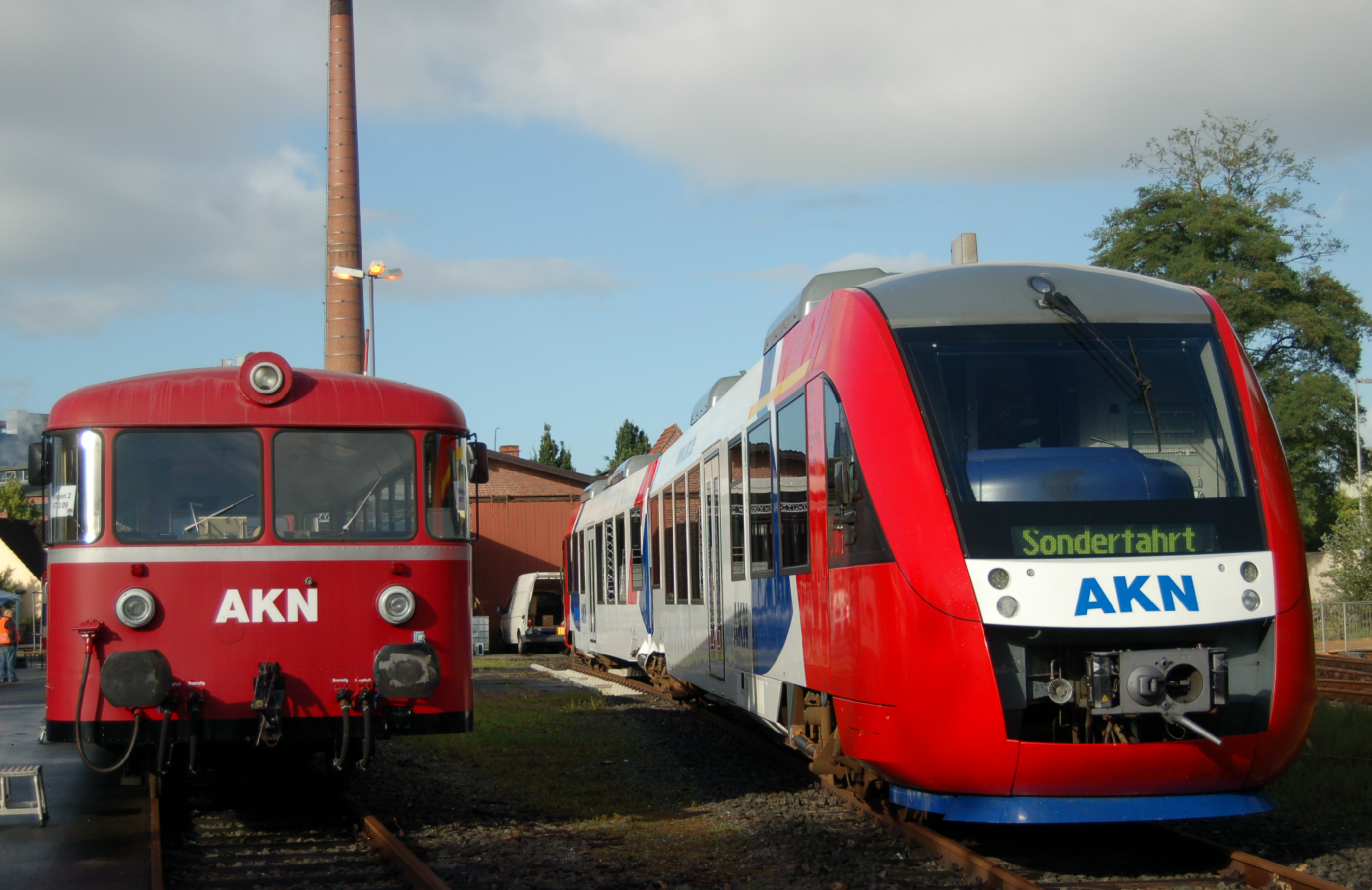
The oldest operable AKN vehicle next to a new one

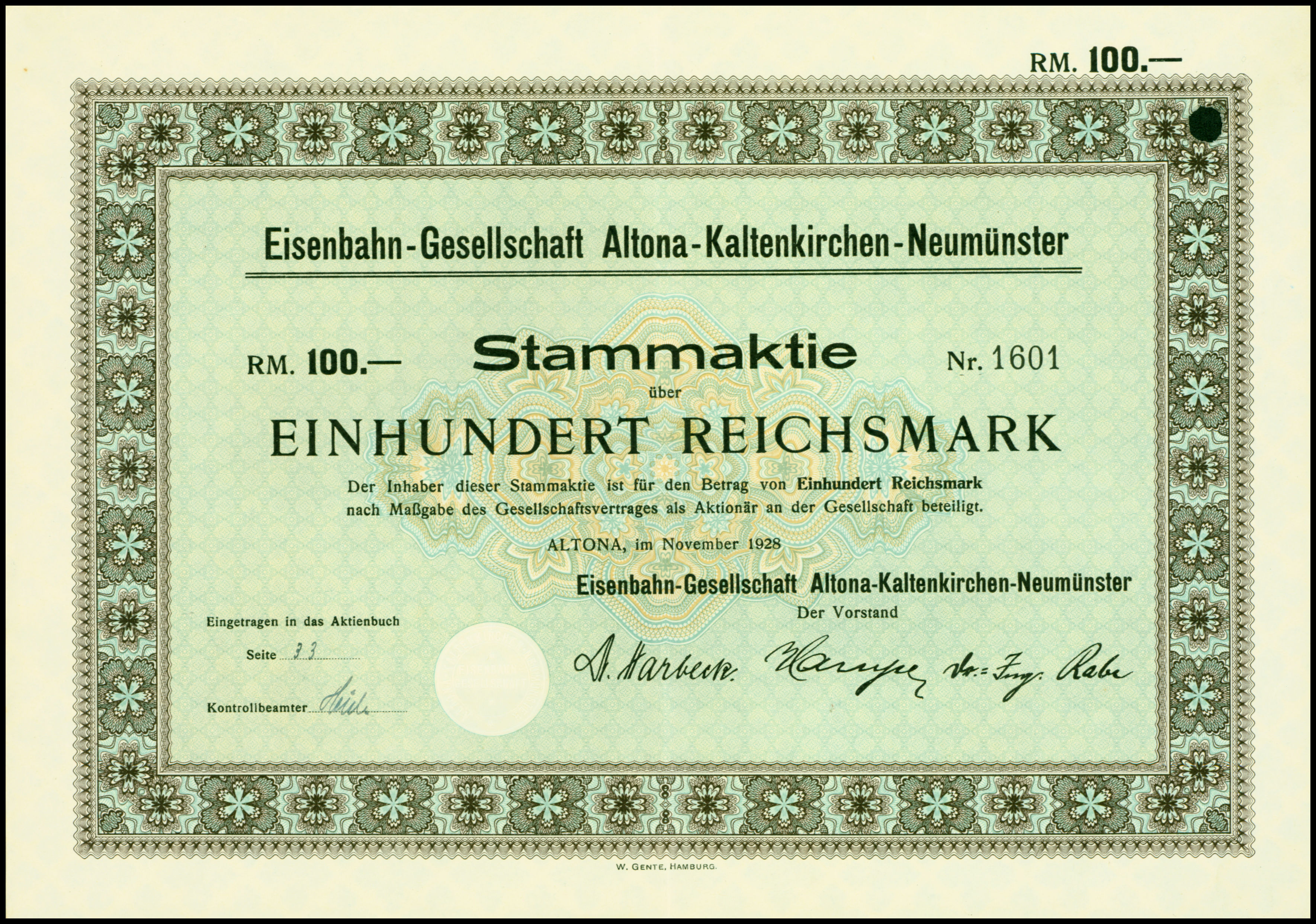
Share of the Eisenbahn-Gesellschaft Altona-Kaltenkirchen-Neumünster, issued November 1928

In 1879, HK Notnagel & Co. of Altona, a lessee of Himmelmoor, located in Quickborn, where peat was mined for heating, called for the construction of a railway for the transport of peat. The municipalities of Quickborn and Kaltenkirchen and the then independent town of Altona supported this project. After the founding of the Altona-Kaltenkirchner Eisenbahn-Gesellschaft (Altona-Kaltenkirchen Railway Company, AKE) in 1883 and an expression of support from the Emperor on 27 April 1883, the construction of the new railway had already started in the autumn of 1883. On 8 September 1884, passenger traffic commenced on the line from Gählerplatz in Altona to Kaltenkirchen and on 24 November of the same year the carriage of freight traffic commenced. The shares were subscribed by the town of Altona, the communities of Quickborn, Ulzburg and Kaltenkirchen and the construction company Kintzel & Lauser. On May 21, 1913, the company as remained Eisenbahn-Gesellschaft Altona-Kaltenkirchen-Neumünster.

Since 1981, the AKN has also operated the Alster Northern Railway (Alsternordbahn, ANB) and the Elmshorn-Barmstedt-Oldesloe railway (EBOE). The AKN had managed the ANB since 1953 and the EBOE since 1957. The Alster Northern Railway was sold to the Verkehrsgesellschaft Norderstedt (Norderstedt transport company), a subsidiary of the Norderstedt municipal utility, in 1992, but operations have continued to be carried out by the AKN.

Currently, 50 percent of the shares are held by the city of Hamburg and 49.89 percent are held by the State of Schleswig-Holstein. The remaining 0.11 percent of shares are held by private individuals.

== Network ==
The original route of the AKN was the Hamburg-Altona–Neumünster railway. Since 1965 AKN has been part of the Hamburger Verkehrsverbund (Hamburg Transport Association, HVV). In the Hamburg rapid transit network, AKN lines are marked with an orange A, sharing the map with the U-Bahn lines (U), S-Bahn lines (S) and Regionalbahn services (R). However, other colours are used to route plans that show only the AKN lines: red for the A1, green for the A2 and dark blue for the A3.

The fares of the HVV apply on almost the entire AKN route network (as far as Boostedt since 2002) otherwise, Schleswig-Holstein fares apply.

Line		Stations and stops
A1	Ulzburg Süd – Eidelstedt (AKN main line)	Kaltenkirchen – Kaltenkirchen Süd – Henstedt-Ulzburg – Ulzburg Süd – Tanneneck – Ellerau – Quickborn – Quickborn Süd – Hasloh – Bönningstedt – Burgwedel – Schnelsen – Hörgensweg – Eidelstedt Zentrum – Eidelstedt (– Stellingen – Langenfelde – Diebsteich – Holstenstraße – Sternschanze – Hamburg Dammtor – Hamburg Hauptbahnhof)
A2	Neumünster - (Kaltenkirchen −) Henstedt-Ulzburg – Norderstedt (Alster Northern Railway)	Neumünster – Neumünster Süd – Boostedt – Großenaspe – Wiemersdorf – Bad Bramstedt – Bad Bramstedt Kurhaus – Lentföhrden – Nützen – Dodenhof – Holstentherme – Kaltenkirchen – Kaltenkirchen Süd – Henstedt-Ulzburg − Ulzburg Süd – Meeschensee – Haslohfurth – Quickborner Straße – Friedrichsgabe – Moorbekhalle – Norderstedt Mitte on behalf of Verkehrsgesellschaft Norderstedt (VGN)
A3	Elmshorn – Barmstedt – Henstedt-Ulzburg (Elmshorn-Barmstedt-Oldesloe railway)	Elmshorn – Langenmoor – Sparrieshoop – Bokholt – Voßloch – Barmstedt Brunnenstraße – Barmstedt – Langeln – Alveslohe – Henstedt-Ulzburg – Ulzburg Süd

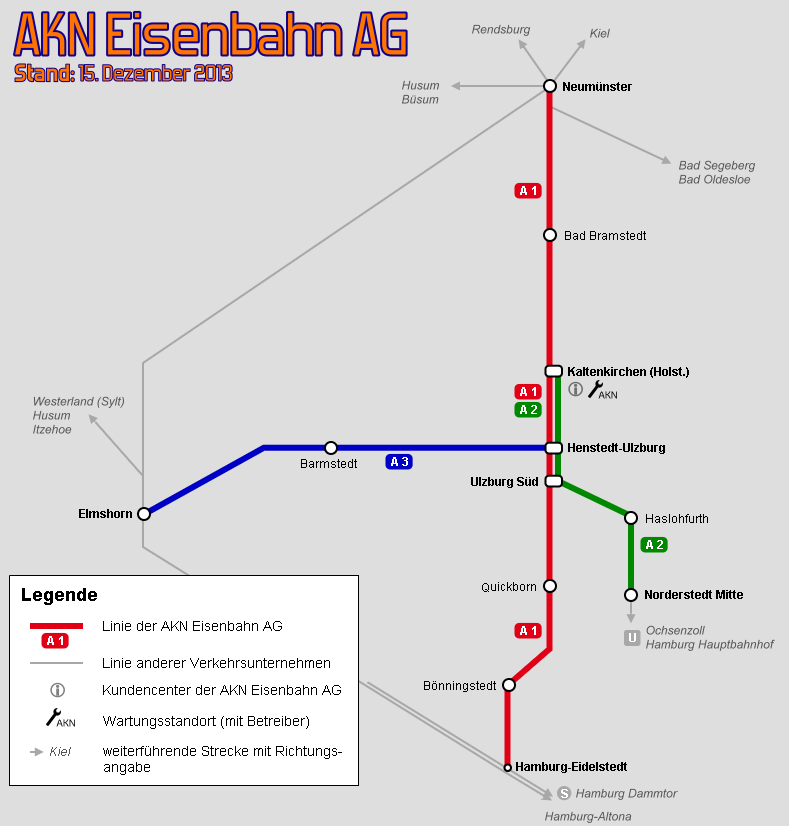
AKN network in Holstein and Hamburg

As part of the railway reform in the mid-1990s, the AKN successfully tendered to operate on some other routes, some of which were previously operated by Deutsche Bahn.

Since 15 December 2002, the Nordbahn Eisenbahngesellschaft, a subsidiary of AKN Eisenbahn and the Hamburger Hochbahn has operated services from Neumünster to Bad Segeberg on the reactivated Neumünster–Bad Oldesloe railway (HVV line R 82).

From 14 December 2003 to 10 December 2011, the Schleswig-Holstein-Bahn, which was 100 percent owned by the AKN, operated through trains passenger traffic on the Neumünster–Heide and the Heide–Büsum lines. Previously AKN passenger trains ran to Heide. This line has also been operated by Nordbahn Eisenbahngesellschaft since 11 December 2011 as a result of re-tendering.

Since 12 December 2004, services are extended on line A1 twice a day (Monday to Friday) between Eidelstedt and Hamburg Hauptbahnhof, using its VTA railcars over the S-Bahn tracks and power supply collected from a side-contact third rail. Since 13 December 2009, the evening services from the Hauptbahnhof have been abandoned, only the two mornings through services on weekdays have been retained.

Since December 2005, additional services of the A2 in the morning and afternoon are extended from Henstedt-Ulzburg to Kaltenkirchen.

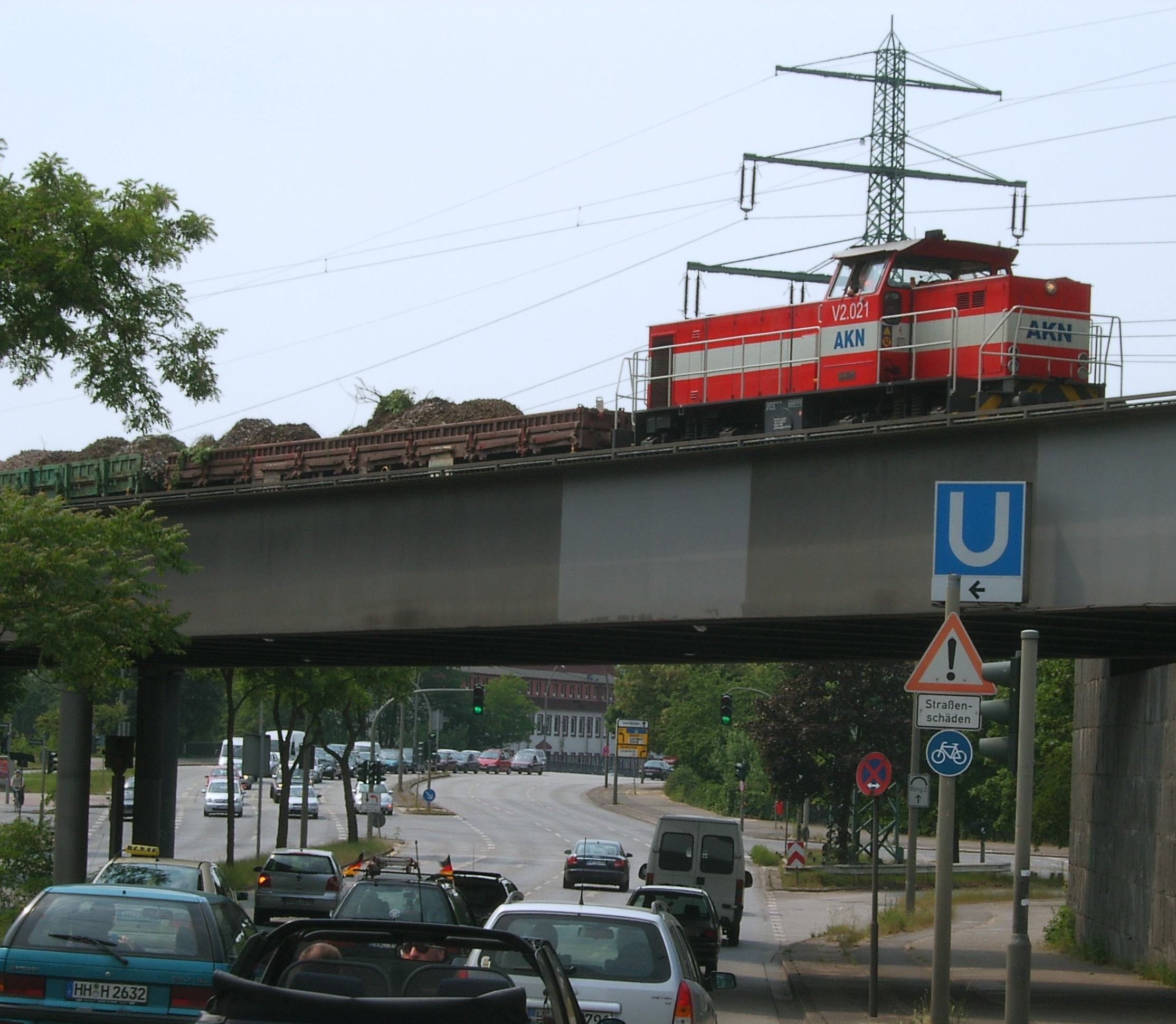
AKN diesel locomotive near Track construction work on the Hamburg freight rail bypass

== Expansion and acceleration ==
Currently, the travel times on the AKN for many connections are not competitive with cars, even measured from station to station. This is a result of:

- the lack of AKN services continuing through Neumünster and Eidelstedt to the centre of Hamburg or Kiel;
- the small distances between the stops along lines A1 and A2;
- line speeds of only 100 km/h;
- some of the railcars are designed to run at only 100 km/h.

Thus, for example, running times average 87 minutes between Henstedt-Ulzburg and Kiel and about 75 minutes between Bad Bramstedt and Hamburg Hauptbahnhof. To improve this situation, several concepts have been developed. Among the measures under consideration are the upgrade of the AKN lines for higher speeds, the establishment of express services with a reduced number of intermediate stops and the construction of a connecting line to the Hamburg Airport S-Bahn line.

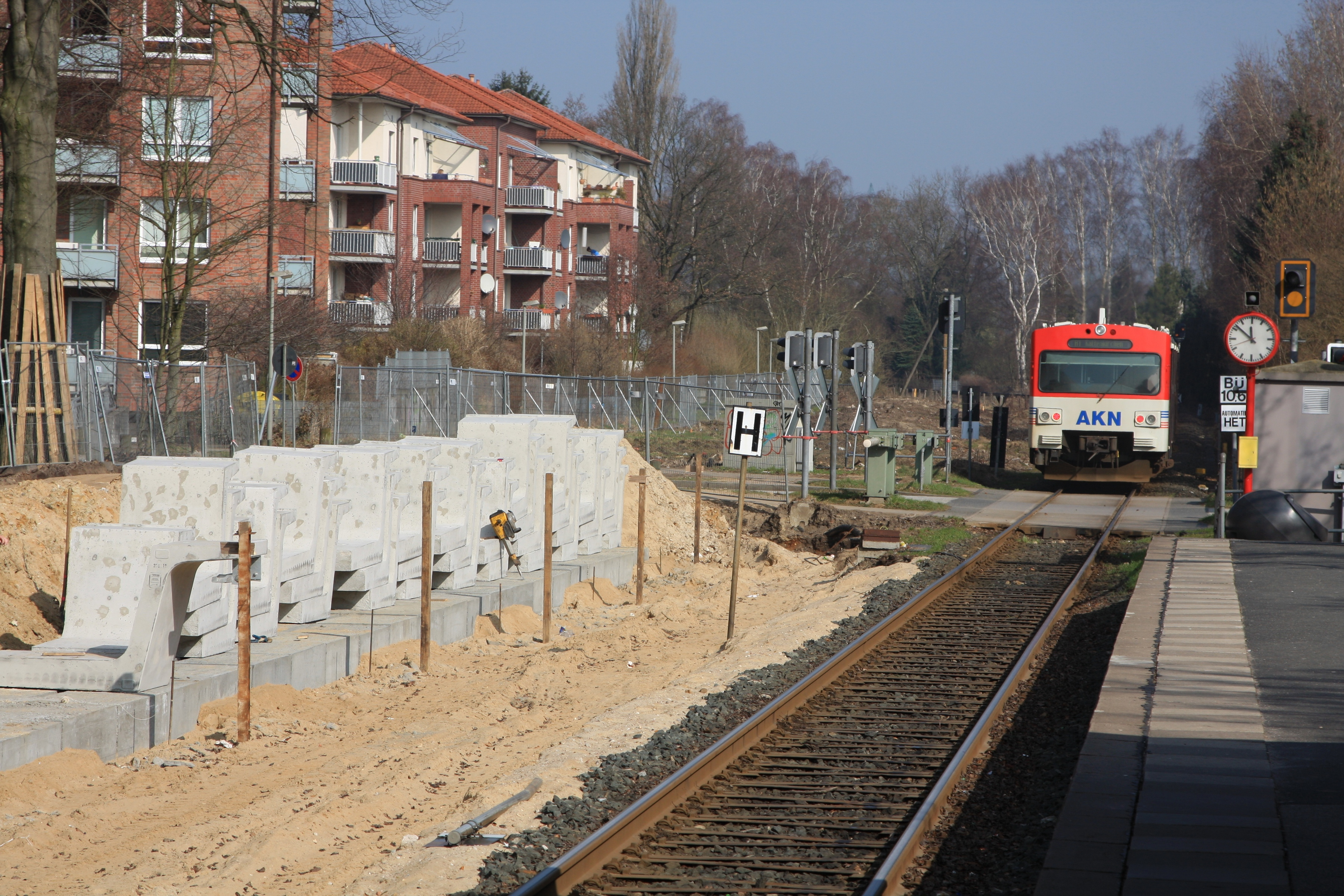
Construction work at Burgwedel station (March 2012)

The construction of a connecting line to the airport is not supported by the Schleswig-Holstein state government because of the considerable cost burden of at least €150 million. The state instead has focused on the upgrade of the existing line of the AKN between Eidelstedt, Quickborn and Kaltenkirchen, allowing it to be operated by both the AKN and the Hamburg S-Bahn. Both companies are interested in operating the route. Particularly with regard to preservation of working places a very close co-operation is planned. In preparation for a possible extension of the S-Bahn network, the section from Halstenbeker Straße to the border near Burgwedel station was duplicated up to 2013 and a new Schnelsen Süd station is planned after the Bönningstedt–Quickborn section has been fully duplicated. AKN has called in the past for the establishment of an all-day grade-separated connection from Eidelstedt to Hamburg Hauptbahnhof, but this failed because it would lead to increased operating costs and because of the limited capacity of the line. An extension of the S-Bahn line would at least overcome the capacity issue. Current status provides a completion of the planning process ("new S21") in 2017 and start of operation in 2020. After the last state election (2015) the extension plans are part of the coalition plan.
