= Ulzburg Süd station =

Railway station in Henstedt-Ulzburg, Germany

Ulzburg Süd
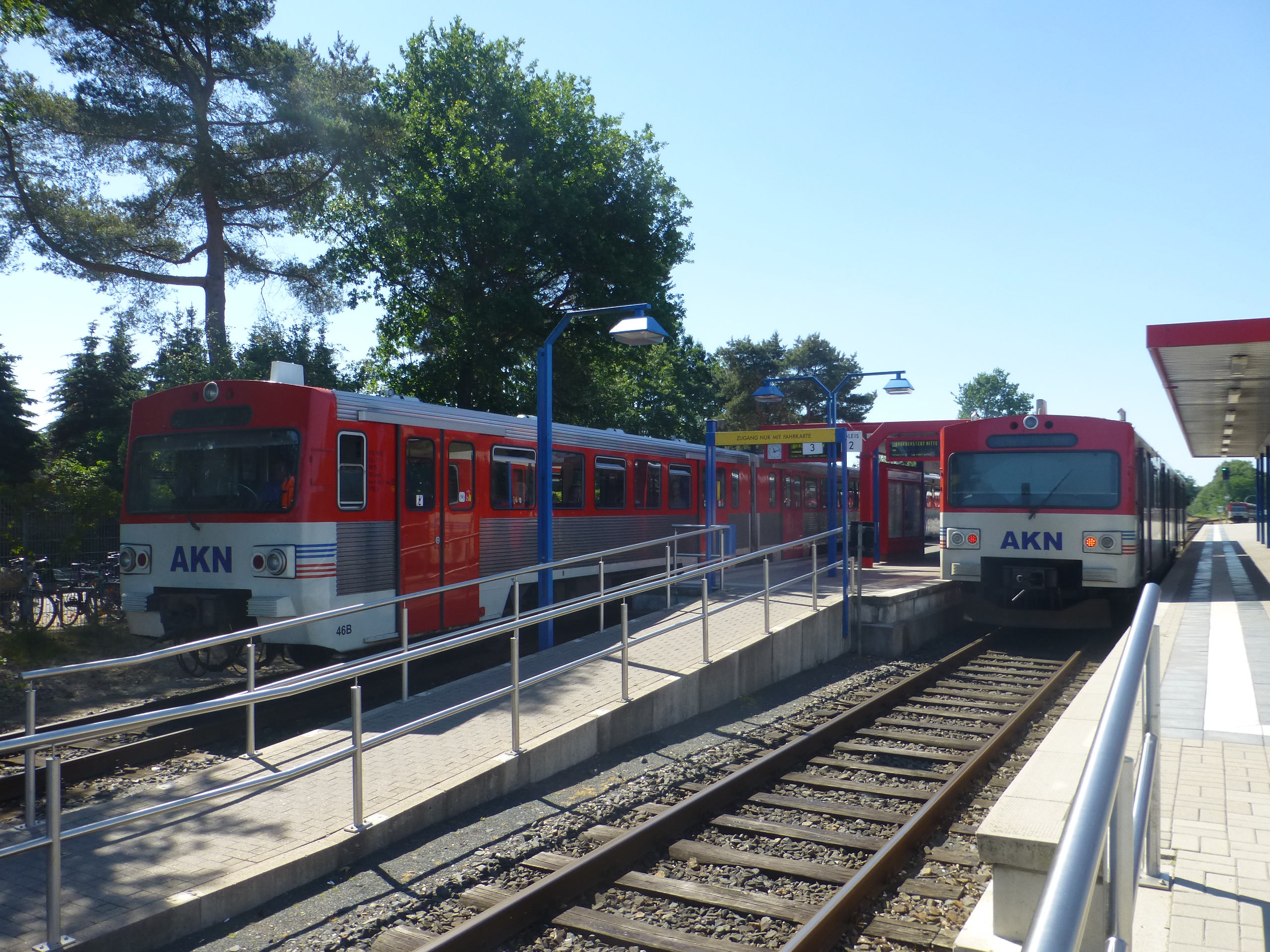

General information
- Location: Henstedt-Ulzburg, Schleswig-Holstein; Germany
- Coordinates: 53°46′24″N 9°58′23″E
- System: HVV rapid transit station
- Lines: Eidelstedt–Kaltenkirchen–Neumünster (KBS 137); Alster Northern Railway (KBS 138)
- Platforms: 3

Other information
- Station code: 688
- DS100 code: AUBS
- Fare zone: HVV: C/604

History
- Opened: 1953
- Former names: Beckershof

Services
Preceding station		Following station
Henstedt-Ulzburg towards Ulzburg Süd	A1	Tanneneck towards Hamburg-Eidelstedt
Henstedt-Ulzburg towards Neumünster	A2	Meeschensee towards Norderstedt Mitte
Henstedt-Ulzburg towards Elmshorn	A3	Terminus
Location

Ulzburg Süd station is a hub on the AKN Eisenbahn network in the municipality of Henstedt-Ulzburg in the German state of Schleswig-Holstein. It is where AKN’s trunk line (the Hamburg-Altona–Neumünster railway) and the Alster Northern Railway, which are now traversed by AKN lines A1 and A2, meet. In addition, trains on line A3 (the Elmshorn-Barmstedt-Oldesloe railway) begin and end in Ulzburg Süd.

The station is located on the western edge of Ulzburg Süd (south), a suburb of Henstedt-Ulzburg.

== History ==
The station was established in 1953 under the name of Beckershof on the AKN trunk line to connect with the newly built Alster Northern Railway, but it was soon renamed Ulzburg Süd. The station was modernised in the mid-1990s. Since then the trains of the Alster Northern Railway have run mainly on the middle track 2 between the two tracks of the AKN trunk line. Until then, the Alster Northern Railway had a separate platform on the eastern edge of the complex. The connection between the two lines has been significantly facilitated since passengers no longer have to change platform to make changes.

From 1976 to 2002 there was a signal box for the lines at this station. It has now been relocated to the AKN operations centre at Kaltenkirchen. A parking area has been built on the site.

== Structure ==
The station currently has two island platforms with three tracks. The middle track is accessible from both platforms. South of the platforms there are two sidings, each about 130 m long. Further south there is a curve connecting between Meeschensee station on the Alster Northern Railway and Tanneneck station on the Hamburg-Altona–Neumünster railway. It is used for freight trains running between Eidelstedt and the Norderstedt industrial railway.

== Operations ==
Every weekday about 300 passenger trains stop in Ulzburg Süd.

The through trains of the AKN trunk line (A1) as a rule stop on the two outer tracks 1 and 3 and the middle track 2 is used by trains on line A2. The timetable allows for direct connections between the two lines with a transition time of 1 to 2 minutes. A3 services begin and end mostly on platform track 3, but on weekends and public holidays platform track 2 is usually used. Through trains on line A2 from Norderstedt Mitte towards Kaltenkirchen also stop on platform track 3.

The bus stop A Ulzburg Süd on line 293 has been located directly next the station since December 2009.
