= Elmshorn station =

Railway station in Elmshorn, Germany

Elmshorn
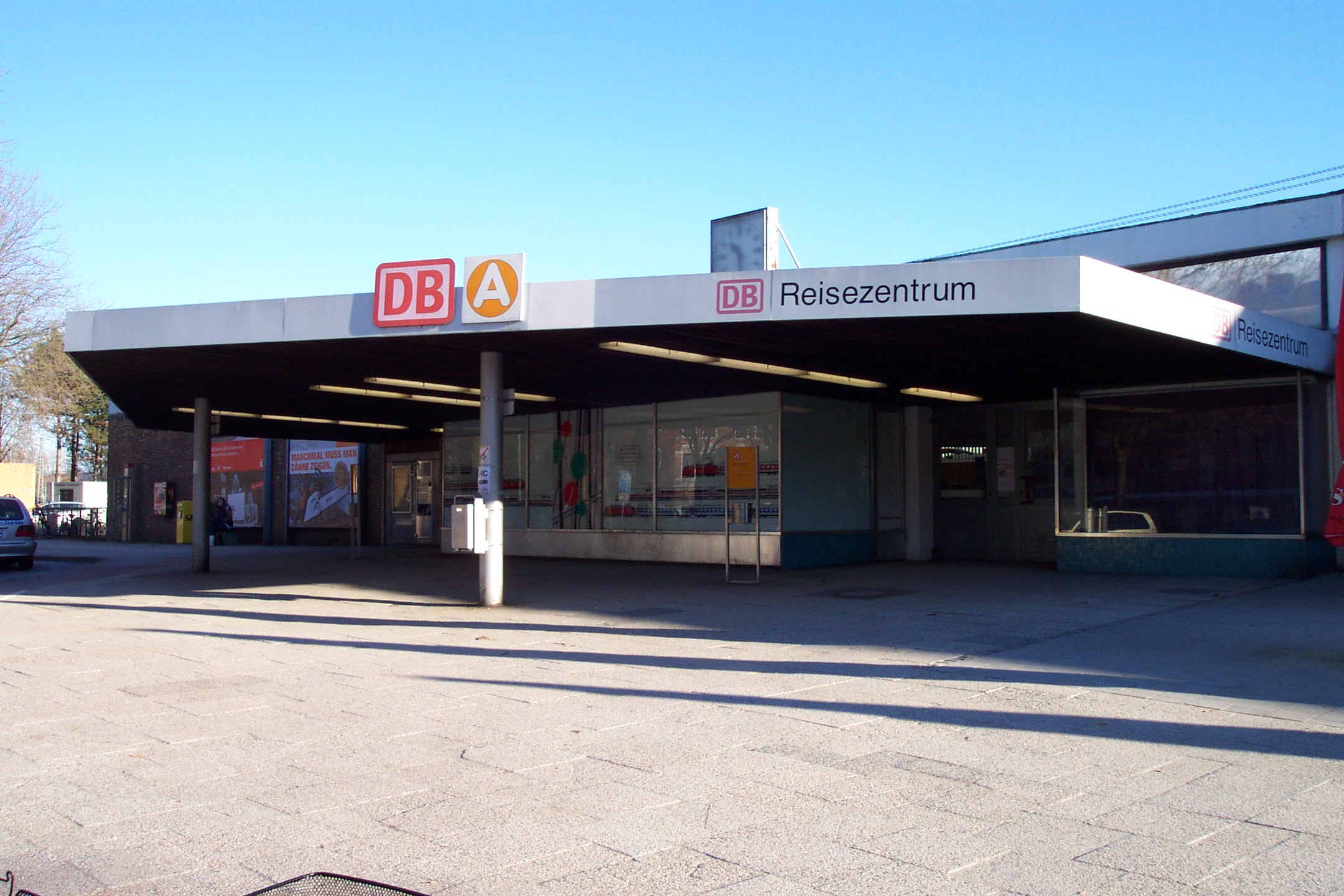

General information
- Location: Elmshorn, Schleswig-Holstein; Germany
- Coordinates: 53.754811°N 9.658971°E
- Owner: DB Netz
- Operator: DB Station&Service
- Lines: Hamburg–Kiel (30,7 km); Elmshorn–Westerland (30,7 km); Elmshorn–Bad Oldesloe (0,0 km); Elmshorn port railway (0,0 km)
- Platforms: 4

Other information
- Station code: 1558
- DS100 code: AEL
- IBNR: 8000092
- Category: 3
- Fare zone: HVV: C/602
- Website: www.bahnhof.de

History
- Opened: 18 September 1844; 181 years ago
- Electrified: 24 September 1995; 30 years ago

Services
| Preceding station | DB Regio Nord | Following station |
|---|---|---|
| Glückstadt towards Westerland (Sylt) | RE 6 | Hamburg-Altona Terminus |
| Neumünster towards Flensburg or Kiel Hbf | RE 7 | Hamburg Dammtor towards Hamburg Hbf |
| Neumünster towards Flensburg or Kiel Hbf | RE 7 | Pinneberg towards Hamburg Hbf |
| Wrist towards Kiel Hbf | RE 70 | Hamburg Dammtor towards Hamburg Hbf |
| Preceding station | | Following station |
| Herzhorn towards Itzehoe | RB 61 | Tornesch towards Hamburg Hbf |
| Herzhorn towards Itzehoe | RB 71 via Marsh Railway | Tornesch towards Hamburg-Altona |
| Horst (Holst) towards Wrist | RB 71 | Tornesch towards Hamburg-Altona |
| Preceding station | | Following station |
| Terminus | A3 | Langenmoor towards Ulzburg Süd |
Location

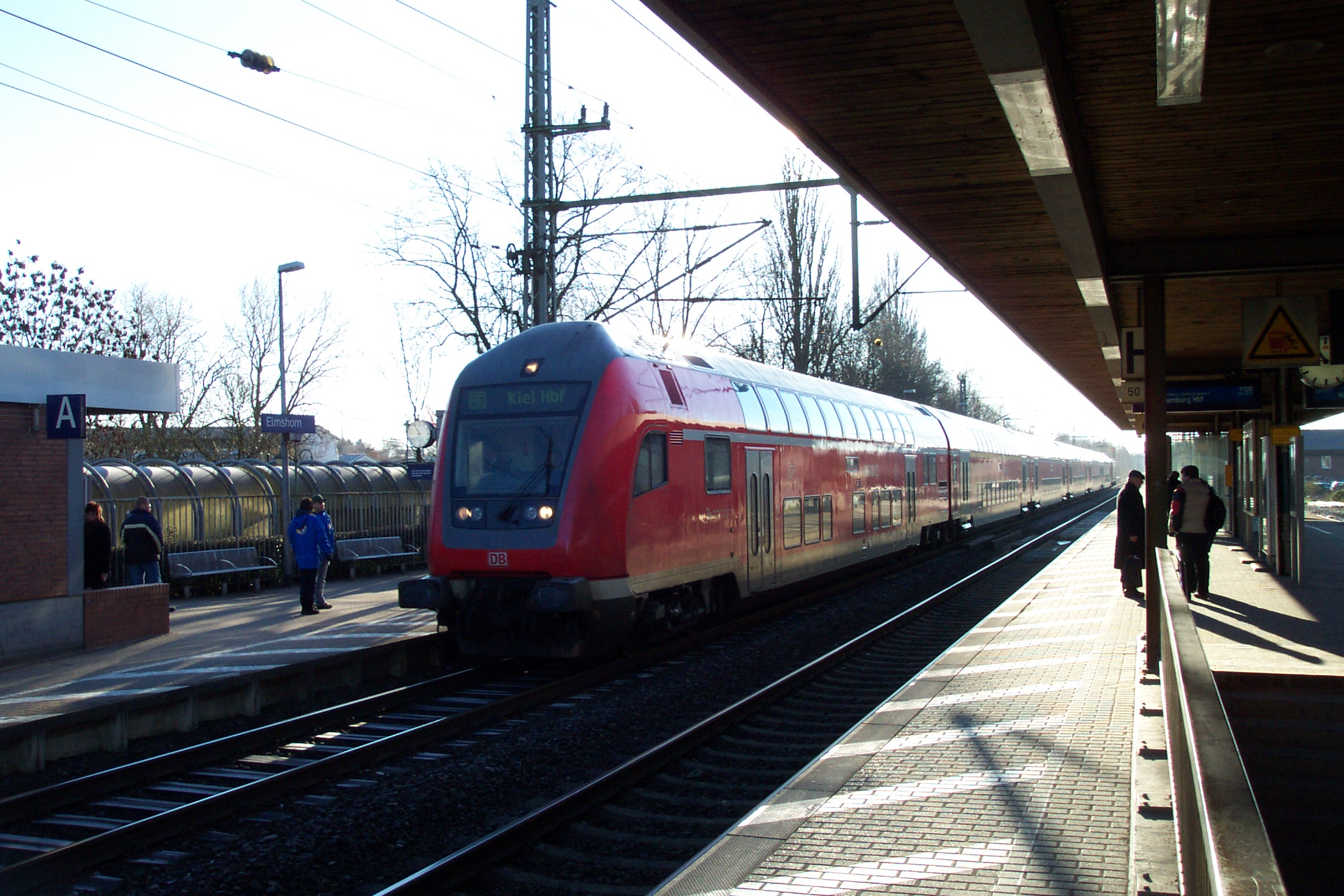
A Regional-Express to Kiel Hbf

Elmshorn station is a railway station in Elmshorn in Schleswig-Holstein. Here the Hamburg-Altona–Kiel railway (R70) meets the Marsh Railway (R60). Elmshorn is also the terminus of the A3 line of the AKN Eisenbahn. That makes it the third-busiest station in Schleswig-Holstein. The Deutsche Bahn classifies it as a category 3 station and Elmshorn station is in the Hamburger Verkehrsverbund.

== History ==
Elmshorn station was opened 18 September 1844, making it one of the oldest stations in the state. The Hamburg-Altona–Kiel railway should go through Barmstedt but as Elmshorn had more habitans the line went through it. Years ago there was a port railway that connected the station with the south of the harbour. It was replaced with trucks and the last tracks disappeared in 2002.

== Traffic ==
The Regionalbahn-Schleswig-Holstein runs with trains to Neumünster, Itzehoe, Pinneberg, and Hamburg-Altona. A Regional-Express connects Hamburg Hauptbahnhof with Kiel Hauptbahnhof. DB Regio Nord offers transportation from Hamburg-Altona to Westerland on Sylt. AKN trains run to Ulzburg-Süd.

On track 1 run the trains to Kiel, Flensburg, Neumünster and Westerland and one Regionalbahn to Itzehoe. On track 2 and 3 run trains to Pinneberg, Hamburg and Itzehoe as well as the Intercitys. On track 1a runs the AKN. The bus station (ZOB (German for "Zentraler Omnibusbahnhof")) is located in front of the station.

=== Routes ===
- Hamburg–Kiel (30.7 km)
- Elmshorn–Westerland (30.7 km)
- Elmshorn–Bad Oldesloe (0.0 km)
- Elmshorn port railway (0.0 km)

=== Lines ===
| Linie | Verlauf | |
|---|---|---|
| RE 6 | Westerland (Sylt) – Niebüll – Husum – Heide (Holst) – Itzehoe – Elmshorn – Hamburg-Altona | |
| RE 7 | Kiel Hbf – | Neumünster – Elmshorn – Pinneberg – Hamburg Hbf |
| RE 7 | Flensburg – | Neumünster – Elmshorn – Pinneberg – Hamburg Hbf |
| RE 70 | Kiel Hbf – Neumünster – Elmshorn – Pinneberg – Hamburg Hbf | |
| RB 61 | Itzehoe – Elmshorn – Pinneberg – Hamburg Hbf | |
| RB 71 | Wrist – | Elmshorn – Pinneberg – Hamburg-Altona |
| RB 71 | Itzehoe – | Elmshorn – Pinneberg – Hamburg-Altona |
| A3 | Ulzburg Süd – Elmshorn | |
