= Stellingen station =

Railway station in Hamburg, Germany

Stellingen
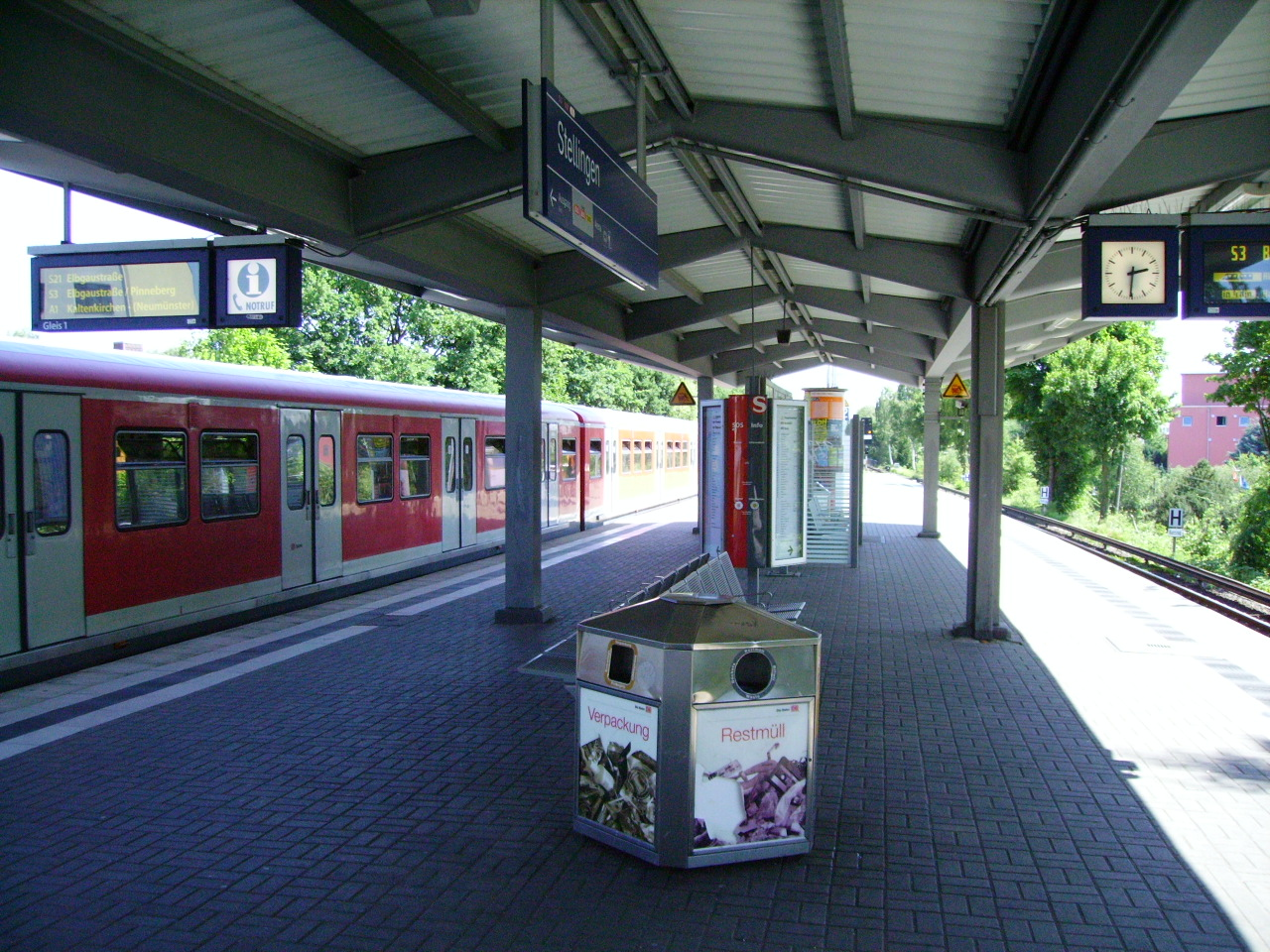

General information
- Location: Volksparkstraße 69; 22525 Hamburg; Germany
- Coordinates: 53°35′22″N 9°55′6″E
- Line: S3 S5
- Platforms: 1 island platform
- Tracks: 2
- Connections: 180 towards Diebsteich/Altona

Construction
- Structure type: Elevated
- Parking: 25 parking lots
- Cycle facilities: No
- Accessible: Yes

Other information
- Station code: ds100: ASTS, DB: 2797; Type: Hp, Category: 4
- Fare zone: HVV: A/101, 201, and 203

History
- Opened: 1903
- Former names: Stellingen (Volksparkstadion)

Services
Preceding station	Hamburg S-Bahn	Following station
Eidelstedt towards Pinneberg	S3	Langenfelde towards Hamburg-Neugraben
Eidelstedt towards Elbgaustraße	S5	Langenfelde towards Stade
Location
- Location within Hamburg Location within Schleswig-Holstein Location within Germany Location within Europe

Stellingen is a railway station on the Hamburg-Altona–Kiel line, northern Germany, served by the Hamburg S-Bahn. The station is located in the Hamburg borough of Eimsbüttel, west of Hamburg Inner City, and a little east to Volksparkstadion In direct neighborhood to the station, motorway A7 crosses above the elevated railway tracks.

== Station layout ==
The elevated station has one island platform with 2 tracks and one exit. The station is fully accessible for handicapped persons; there is a lift and a special floor layout for blind persons.

A small shop in the station sells fast food and newspapers. There are no lockers. No personnel is present at the station but there are SOS and information telephones, ticket machines and 25 parking spaces. In front of the station is a taxicab stand.

== Station services ==
=== Rail ===
The rapid transit trains of the lines S3 and S5 of the Hamburg S-Bahn call at the station.

The direction of the trains on track 1 is northbound towards Pinneberg (S3) and Elbgaustraße (S5). On track 2 the trains run southbound in the direction Stade (S5), and Neugraben (S3).

=== Bus ===
Two bus routes call at a bus stop located in the station forecourt in the east.

== Gallery ==
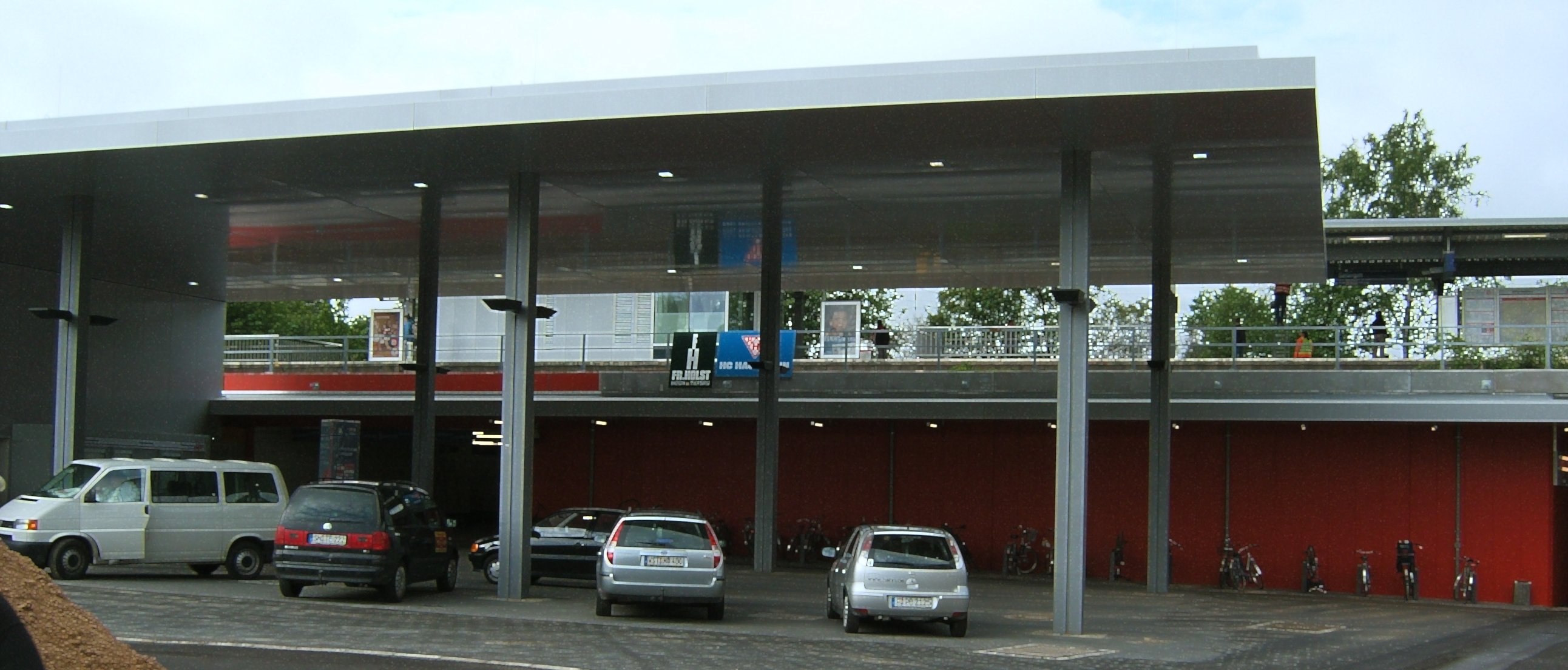
Station's exterior

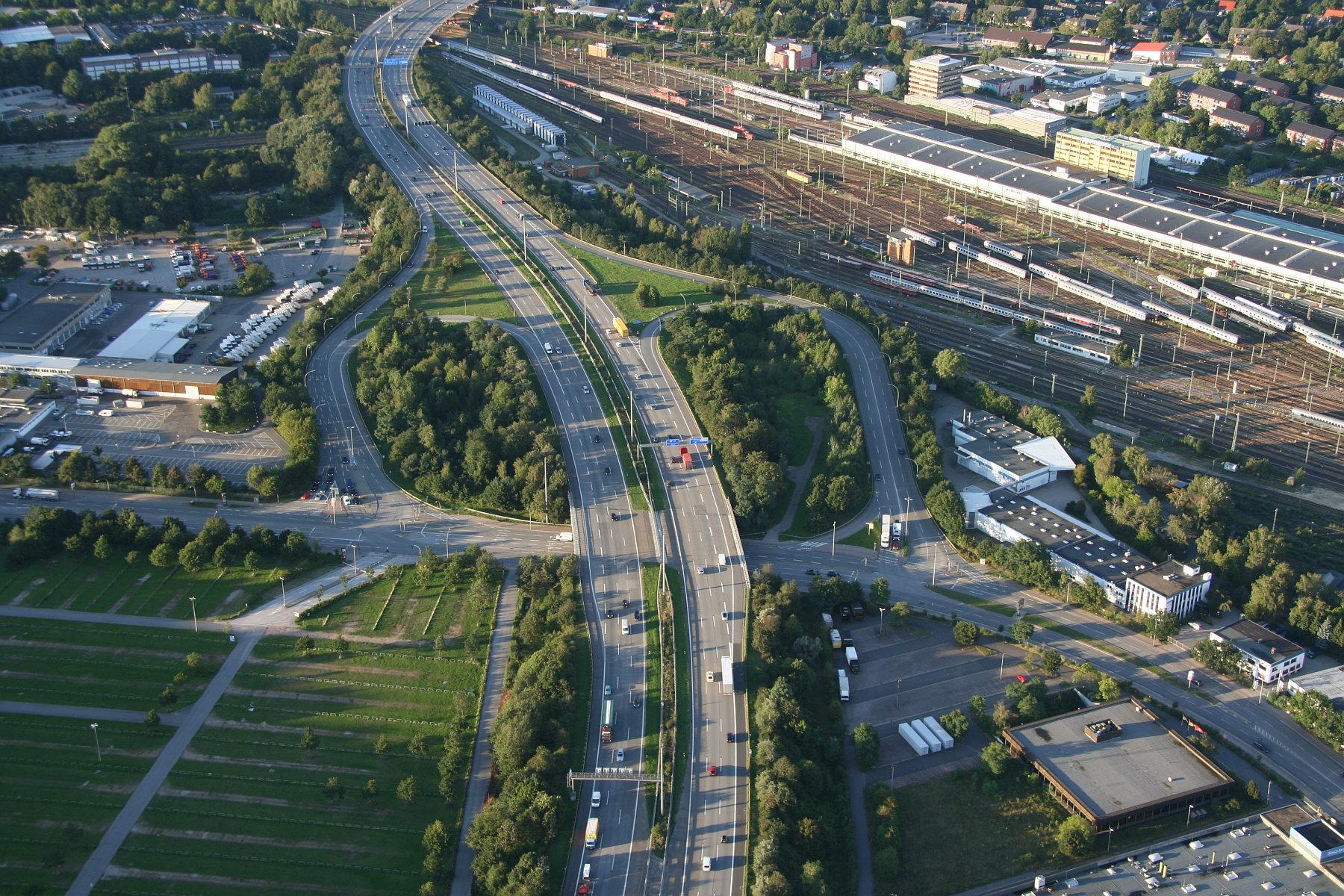
Aerial view from the South: Bundesautobahn 7 crosses the rail tracks at Stellingen station (top); Altona Volkspark, Imtech Arena and O_{2} World to the left (not on photo)

== See also ==
- Hamburger Verkehrsverbund (HVV)
- Imtech Arena
