= Quickborn =

- Town
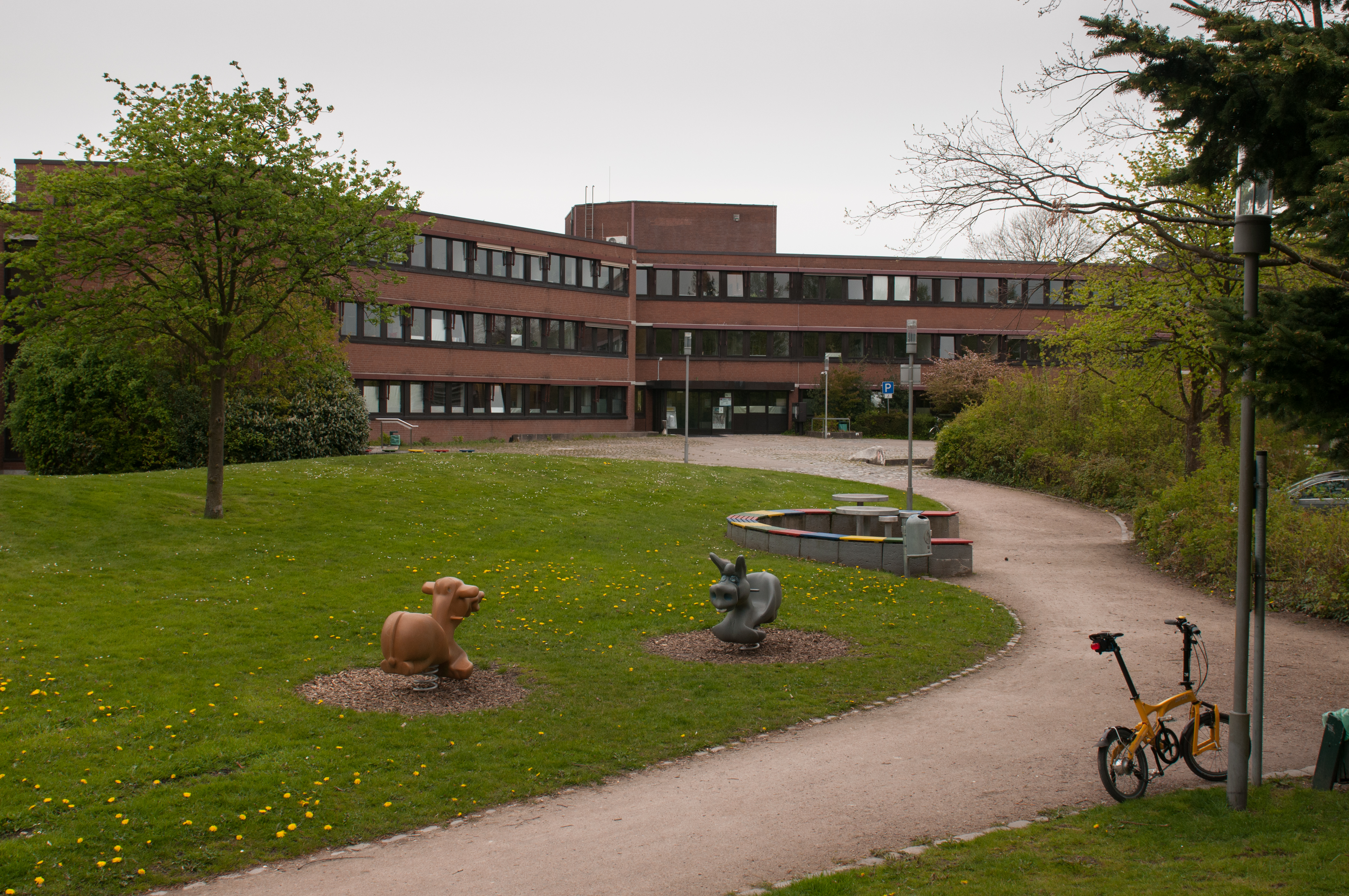
- Town hall

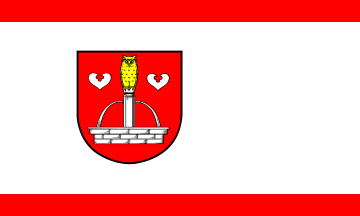
- Flag Coat of arms

- Location of Quickborn within Pinneberg district
- Interactive map of Quickborn
- Location within Germany Location within Schleswig-Holstein
- Coordinates: 53°44′0″N 9°53′50″E
- Country: Germany
- State: Schleswig-Holstein
- District: Pinneberg

Government
  - Mayor: Thomas Beckmann (FDP)

Area
  - Total: 43.16 km^{2} (16.66 sq mi)
- Elevation: 19 m (62 ft)

Population (2025-12-31)
  - Total: 22,662
  - Density: 525.1/km^{2} (1,360/sq mi)
- Time zone: UTC+01:00 (CET)
  - Summer (DST): UTC+02:00 (CEST)
- Postal codes: 25451
- Dialling codes: 04106, 04193
- Vehicle registration: PI
- Website: www.quickborn.de

Quickborn (German pronunciation: [ˈkvɪkbɔʁn]) is a town in the district of Pinneberg, in Schleswig-Holstein, Germany. It belongs to Metropolregion Hamburg and is located on the north part of Hamburg on Autobahn A7. It is a 700 year old town which also belonged to Denmark in the past.

== Connectivity ==
Quickborn is located about 18 km north from the centre of Hamburg, on the eastern edge of Kreis Pinneberg. It lies on the A7 between Hamburg and Neumünster. It is situated just 6 km from the Hamburg Airport. Quickborn is also located along the Hamburg-Altona–Neumünster railway, which connects it to the AKN railway and buses of the Hamburger Verkehrsverbund. As of 2026, the Hamburg-Altona–Neumünster railway is in the process of being converted into part of the S-Bahn network, to provide direct train services to Hamburg Hauptbahnhof.

== Geography ==
Northwest of Quickborn is the Himmelmoor, the largest raised bog in Schleswig-Holstein, which is about 605 hectares large. It has long been used for peat mining. For this purpose, a narrow-gauge railway was built through the bog. These days the area has been converted to a nature reserve and is a popular recreation and birdwatching area. The railway is now operated by a registered association for educational and tourist purposes in the summertime.

South of the city is the Holmmoor, a nature preserve that is about 110 ha. large.

== Climate ==
Climate data for Quickborn (1991–2020 normals)
Month	Jan	Feb	Mar	Apr	May	Jun	Jul	Aug	Sep	Oct	Nov	Dec	Year
Mean daily maximum °C (°F)	4.0 (39.2)	4.9 (40.8)	8.8 (47.8)	14.0 (57.2)	18.0 (64.4)	20.9 (69.6)	23.4 (74.1)	22.7 (72.9)	18.9 (66.0)	13.7 (56.7)	8.3 (46.9)	5.2 (41.4)	13.5 (56.3)
Daily mean °C (°F)	−0.4 (31.3)	0.7 (33.3)	4.9 (40.8)	9.7 (49.5)	14.2 (57.6)	17.6 (63.7)	19.3 (66.7)	18.9 (66.0)	14.1 (57.4)	9.0 (48.2)	4.0 (39.2)	0.6 (33.1)	9.4 (48.9)
Mean daily minimum °C (°F)	−1.0 (30.2)	−1.3 (29.7)	0.5 (32.9)	3.0 (37.4)	6.4 (43.5)	9.5 (49.1)	11.7 (53.1)	11.3 (52.3)	8.7 (47.7)	5.8 (42.4)	2.6 (36.7)	0.3 (32.5)	4.8 (40.6)
Average precipitation mm (inches)	74.2 (2.92)	54.8 (2.16)	58.0 (2.28)	37.1 (1.46)	60.8 (2.39)	78.0 (3.07)	91.2 (3.59)	86.3 (3.40)	67.1 (2.64)	65.4 (2.57)	70.2 (2.76)	78.8 (3.10)	821.5 (32.34)
Average precipitation days (≥ 1.0 mm)	18.0	16.7	14.9	13.3	13.3	15.6	16.2	17.8	15.3	16.0	18.0	19.1	196.8
Average relative humidity (%)	87.5	85.0	80.8	74.6	74.1	75.2	76.6	79.0	82.8	85.7	89.3	89.7	81.7
Mean monthly sunshine hours	40.1	63.2	116.7	182.8	223.9	207.3	220.0	191.0	146.4	107.4	49.1	34.6	1,570.8
Source: World Meteorological Organization

== Employers in Quickborn ==
- Comdirect Bank Head Quarters
- Pinneberg Justice Court Branch
- Hansewerk

== Twin towns – sister cities ==
Quickborn is twinned with:

- Boxholm, Sweden (since 1974)
- Malchow, Germany (since 1990)
- Uckfield, England, United Kingdom (since 1990)

== Notable people ==
- Franz Josef Degenhardt (1931–2011), songwriter, poet, satirist, and novelist
- Mike Krüger (born 1951), comedian, actor, singer, who lived for several years in Quickborn
- Daniel Matthias Heinrich Mohr (1780–1808), botanist
- Carlo von Tiedemann (1943–2025), television presenter and actor
