= Hamburg-Altona–Neumünster railway =

German railway line

Hamburg-Altona–Neumünster
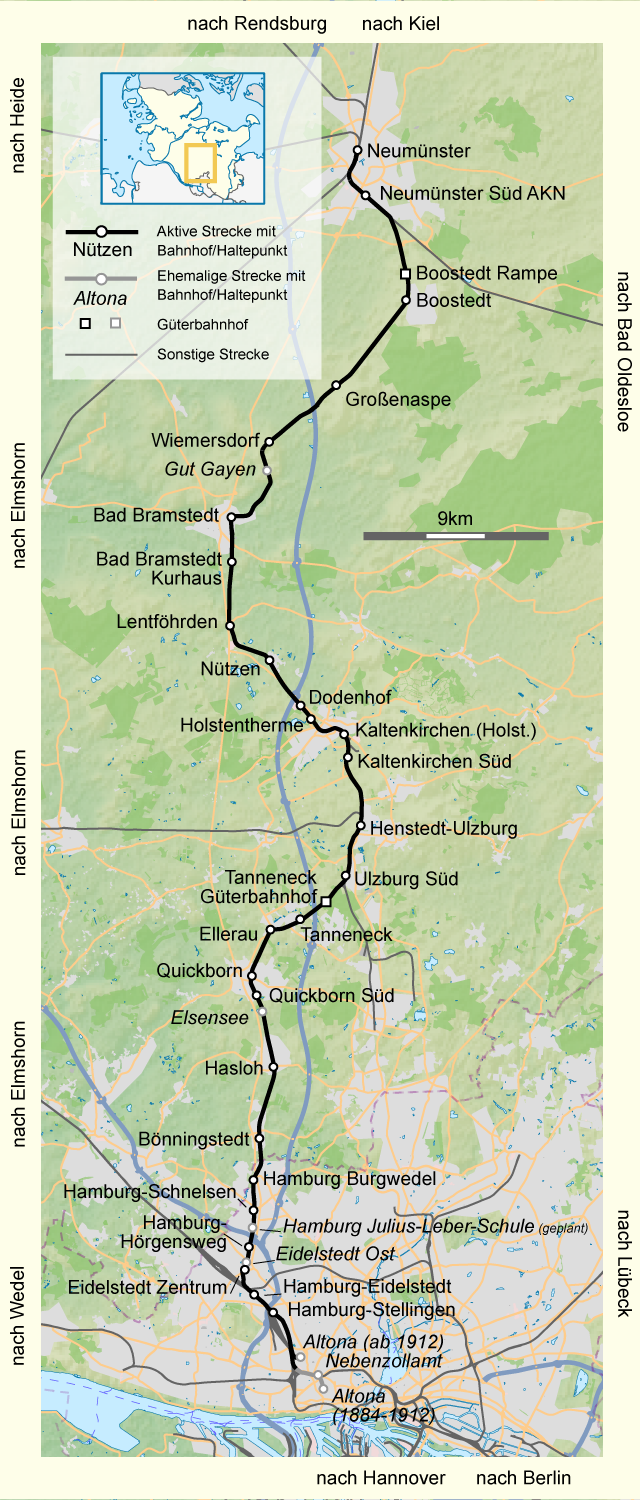

Overview
- Line number: 9121
- Locale: Schleswig-Holstein and Hamburg Germany

Service
- Route number: 137

Technical
- Line length: 75 km (47 mi)
- Track gauge: 1,435 mm (4 ft 8 1/2 in) standard gauge
- Operating speed: 100 km/h (62.1 mph) (maximum)

The Hamburg-Altona–Neumünster railway is the original line of the AKN Eisenbahn (railway) in the German states of Hamburg and Schleswig-Holstein. Today, passenger services on the 64.5 km-long Hamburg Eidelstedt–Neumünster section are operated by AKN.

== History ==
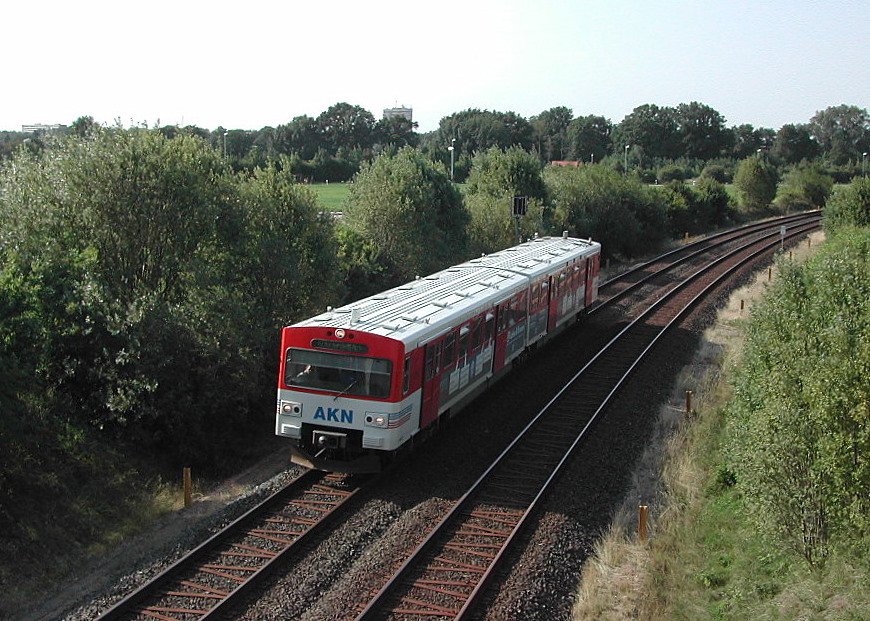
A VTA railcar of the AKN on the line

On 8 September 1884, the Altona-Kaltenkirchner Eisenbahn-Gesellschaft (Altona-Kaltenkirchen Railway Company), which was established in the previous year, opened the line from Altona to Kaltenkirchen for passenger traffic. Freight operations commenced on 24 November 1884. The line was initially operated by the Kintzel & Lauser company, which had also built the line and owned share in the Altona-Kaltenkirchen Railway Company. There was initially no provision for the transfer of freight to the state railways, but it was possible for freight to connect with the Hamburg tramway in Altona. Accordingly, a central buffer coupling was selected, which was also necessary at the beginning because of the sharp curves of the line. The AKE took over the management of the line in 1892.

The line was originally planned as narrow gauge railway, but it was then built as standard gauge. It largely followed the Altona-Kiel road (Altona-Kieler Chaussee) built between 1830 and 1832 with its southernmost section running north along Holstenstraße from the Kaltenkirchen station (Kaltenkirchener Bahnhof) in Altona. It ran over the Hamburg-Altona link line using folding track (this was able to fold to give one line or the other a clear passage), running on street level from Schulterblatt station (about where Haubachstraße now runs) to the Viktoria barracks. Further north it crossed the border of the common customs territory of Hamburg/Altona where the Bahnhof Nebenzollamt (minor customs office railway station) was established. Customs checks were carried out there until 1888 when Hamburg joined the Zollverein (German customs union).

In 1893, the link line was rebuilt on an embankment to the north of the Holsten Brewery and Holstenstraße station was built, as it exists today, with the AKE operating at street level on the Gählersplatz–Nebenzollamt section. On 20 August 1898, the line was extended via Kaltenkirchen to Bramstedt and Nebenzollamt station was renamed as the Bramstedter Bahnhof (Bramstedt line station).

South of Eidelstedt there was a slope that caused difficulties for longer trains. In 1902, a connection was built to the state railway in Eidelstedt, where freight wagons were transferred.

On 17 December 1912, the line between Altona and Eidelstedt was laid parallel to the Hamburg-Altona–Kiel railway on the current route because of the increasing traffic of the Altona-Kiel road. The line speed was now 40 km/h. The terminus in Altona was now to the north of the link line at Sonderburger Platz, now Kaltenkirchener Platz, at the newly built (second) Kaltenkirchen station. This was used by the post office until 1962 and was then taken over by it. A loading facility for parcel traffic was built on the site from 1965 to 1973; until then parcel traffic had been housed in the old post office building on Stephansplatz.

Permission to extend the line to Neumünster was sought in 1913 and it was approved on 1 December 1914. Operation on the new line commenced on 1 August 1916. In 1914, the company had been renamed as the Eisenbahn Altona-Kaltenkirchen-Neumünster (Altona-Kaltenkirchen-Neumünster Railway). The terminus was at the Neumünster Süd station on the Neumünster–Bad Oldesloe railway.

After the Second World War the track was left in a poor condition. Wiemersdorf station was destroyed by the explosion of an ammunition train.

After 1957, the track was operated with a simplified form of train control using instruction over the radio. In 1962, a connection was built for the Hamburg S-Bahn to the AKN route from Holstenstrasse station, Diebsteich station was built and the southern terminus of the AKN route was moved to Langenfelde.

In 1974, the track was rebuilt with continuously welded rail. The platforms between Eidelstedt and Kaltenkirchen were raised to a uniform height of 76 cm and extedended to a length of 100 metres. Crossings were abolished or secured with half-barriers. This allowed the travel time between Kaltenkirchen and Eidelstedt to be reduced to between 38 and 44 minutes. A central signal box was put into operation in Ulzburg Süd in 1976 and signal boxes were also installed in Quickborn, Hamburg-Schnelsen and Kaltenkirchen (from 1982). Since 1983, they work with microprocessors instead of relay technology. Signalling on the line began to be controlled from an electronic interlocking in Kaltenkirchen from 2002. The entire route was converted by 2005.

The line between Ulzburg Süd and Kaltenkirchen Süd was duplicated between 1997 and 2001. For this purpose, the line in Henstedt-Ulzburg was shifted by several hundred metres to the west. The line now passes under the centre through a 630-meter-long tunnel and the end of Henstedt-Ulzburg station towards the tunnel is now located underground. The operation of traffic on the new line started on 28 August 2000 and about a year later the work was completed and the new buildings were officially opened.

Between Eidelstedt and Schnelsen part of the track was rebuilt between 2001 and 2004 to pass under three streets. A new Eidelstedt Zentrum station was built on this section. The entrance to Eidelstedt station was changed. The line passes under the eastern S-Bahn track and then connects with the S-Bahn tracks, making it possible for trains to continue on the S-Bahn tracks. South of Eidelstedt station it connects with the freight line towards Langenfelde. Since 2006, the line between Schnelsen and Quickborn has been upgraded; double track has been in operation between Bönningstedt and Hasloh since 28 October 2007. The Hasloh–Quickborn Süd section has been duplicated since May 2011; this was followed by the commissioning of double track between Halstenbeker Straße and Schnelsen station in October 2011. Double track has been operational between Schnelsen and Bönningstedt since October 2012. With the completion of this work, there will initially be no further duplication.

Track renewals since 1989 have almost exclusively used Y-shaped sleepers. Over 100 km of the AKN network is now equipped with them.

Between 2001 and 2004, Kaltenkirchen station was rebuilt in a cutting and a 400-metre-long tunnel was built to its north. This replaced several level crossing.

Since 1 December 2002, the AKN has leased the section of line between Neumünster Süd and Neumünster from DB Netz and it runs to Neumünster, continuing to Heide and Büsum.

== Upgrades ==
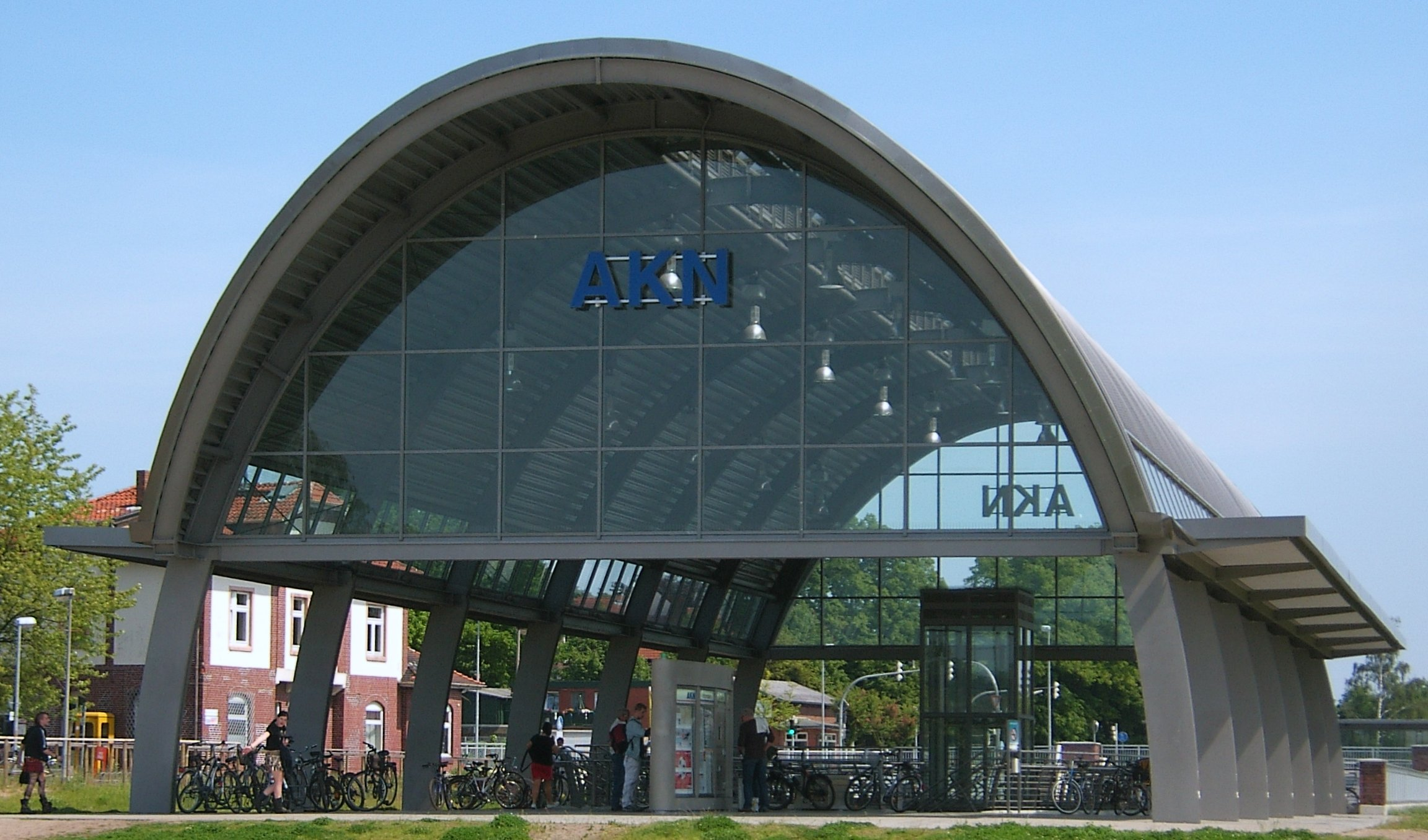
New Kaltenkirchen station

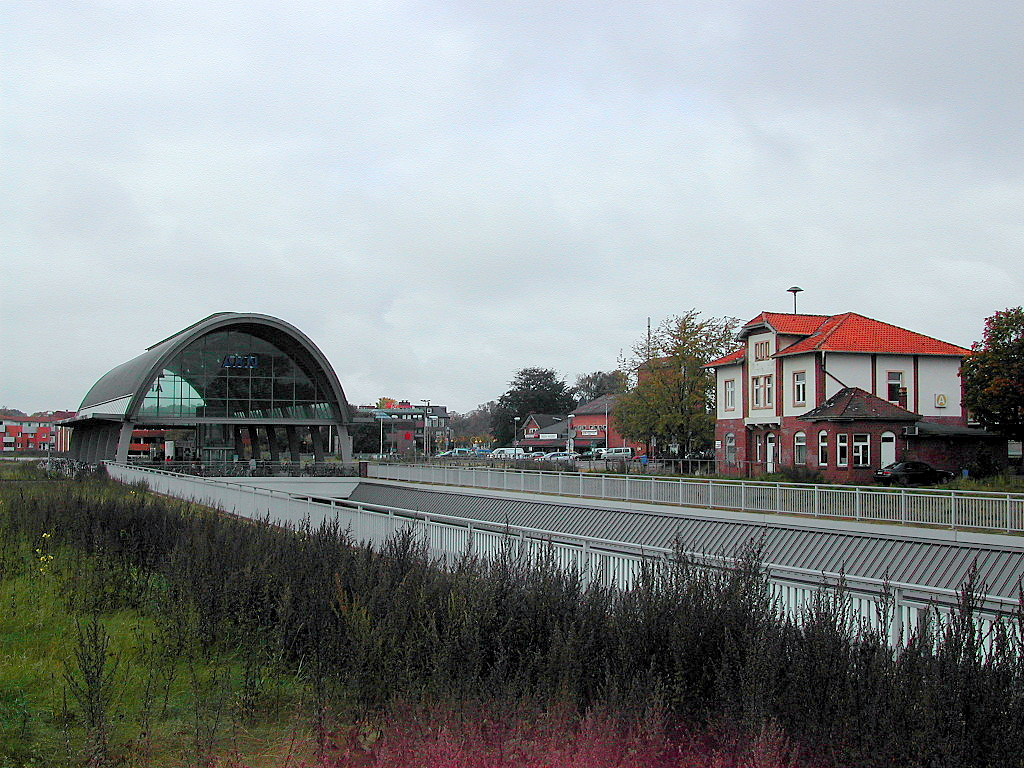
New and old Kaltenkirchen stations

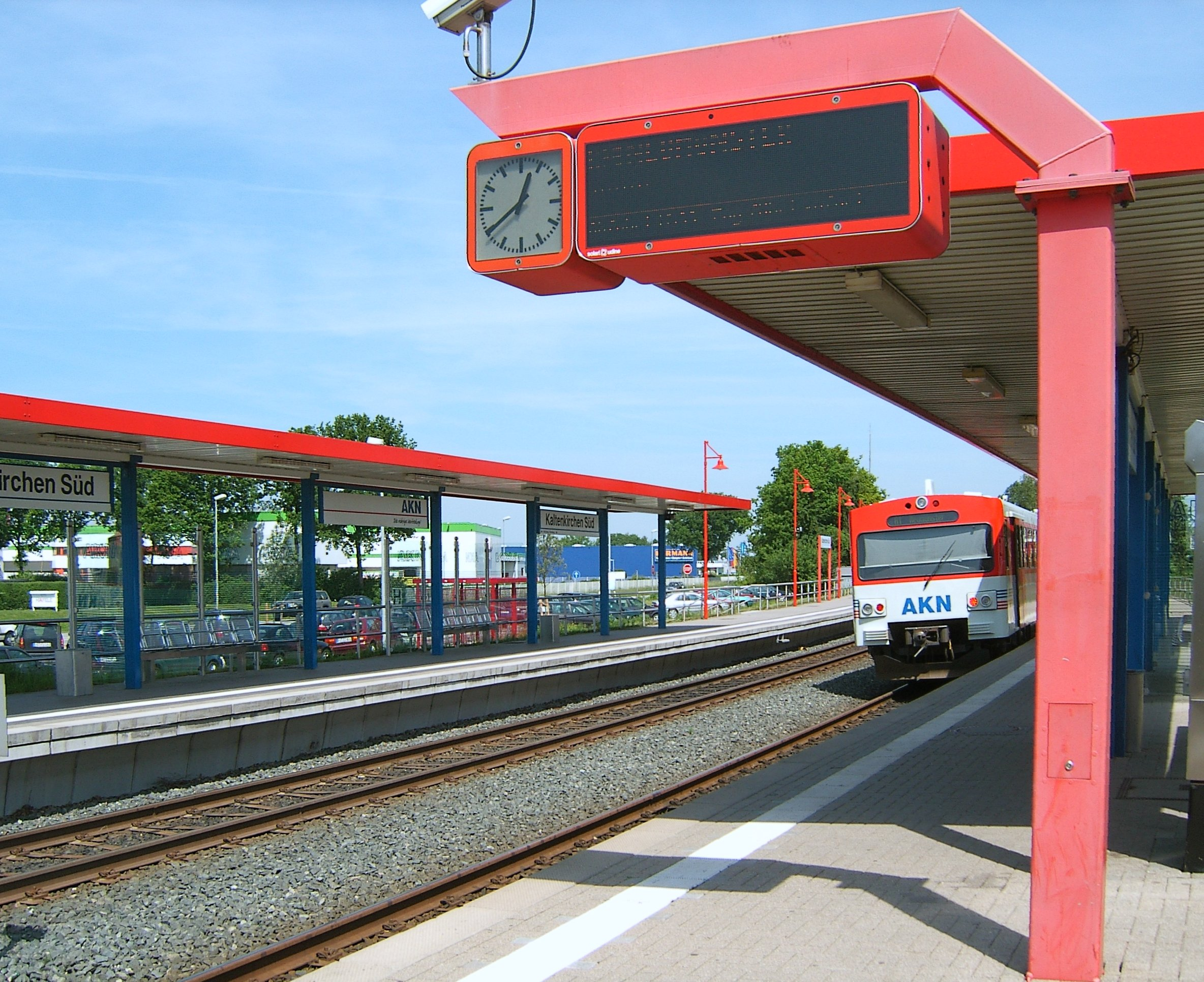
Kaltenkirchen Süd station

The southern section of the line between Hamburg–Kaltenkirchen has been upgraded in many places since 1995. In the medium term it is planned to complete the duplication and to integrate it into the Hamburg S-Bahn network. The following projects, among others, had been completed by October 2012:

- a grade separated connection with the S-Bahn network in Eidelstedt
- the new Eidelstedt Zentrum station in a sub-surface location
- duplication between Eidelstedt Zentrum and Quickborn
- duplication between Ulzburg Süd and Kaltenkirchen Süd with the elimination of all grade crossings and construction of a new Henstedt-Ulzburg station in a sub-surface location and a nearly 600 m long tunnel south of it
- a new Kaltenkirchen station in a sub-surface location

There continues to be single track between Eidelstedt and Kaltenkirchen, on individual sections between Eidelstedt and Eidelstedt Zentrum, between Quickborn and Ellerau and between Kaltenkirchen Süd and Kaltenkirchen.

The entire line is controlled from the AKN operations centre in Kaltenkirchen via local electronic interlockings.

All stations on the southern sector from Kaltenkirchen to Eidelstedt are equipped with electronic passenger information displays; on the northern section individual stations such as Bad Bramstedt and Neumünster Süd are so equipped.

== Former stations ==
Elsensee station lay between Hasloh and Quickborn Süd and was mainly used by employees of the Thörlschen margarine factory. This was closed during World War II due to air raids and moved to Hamburg-Harburg. Although superfluous, the station was only that closed in 1974 during the reconstruction of the line.

Gut Gayen station lay between Bad Bramstedt and Wiemersdorf. A sandy platform still exists.

Until 2002, Eidelstedt Ost station was a few hundred metres to the north of the current Eidelstedt Zentrum station.

== Current operation ==
AKN's local trains now run mainly at 20-minute intervals on the Eidelstedt-Kaltenkirchen section. These intervals apply on weekdays between 5 AM and 11 PM and on Saturday between 7 AM and 9 PM. In peak hours, there are additional services with trains largely running every 10 minutes. Later in the evenings and on Sundays, services run at 40-minute intervals.

Between Kaltenkirchen and Neumünster services mainly run every hour.

Since the 2020s trains on the A2 service from Norderstedt Mitte run via Ulzburg Süd further on to Kaltenkirchen and Neumünster.

A3 services also run between Henstedt-Ulzburg and Ulzburg Süd every hour.

The busiest part of the line is the section between Ulzburg Süd and Henstedt-Ulzburg, which regularly has up to nine trains per hour in each direction.

The route was regularly used for freight to and from the Norderstedt industrial railway (Norderstedter Industriebahn) and is required as a detour route when the Hamburg-Elmshorn-Neumünster line is blocked for long-distance freight trains.

== Passengers ==
In 1884, the trip from Altona to Kaltenkirchen took more than two hours. Nevertheless, more than 150,000 passengers were carried in the first year. In 1930, the first railcars were used to carry the traffic more cost-effectively. After the Second World War daily passenger services were restored on 25 May 1945. In 1946, there were already ten daily passenger trains. Passenger numbers rose: in 1945 there were 1,495,000 passengers and in 1948 there were 3,883,000 passengers. From 31 March 1953, passenger services continued from Neumünster Süd station over the tracks of Deutsche Bundesbahn’s Neumünster–Bad Oldesloe line to Neumünster station.

With the extension of the Hamburg S-Bahn, the southern terminus for passenger services was moved from Kaltenkirchener station in Altona to Langenfelde in 1962 and finally to Eidelstedt in 1965. The S-Bahn tracks (now lines S3 and S5) are located west and parallel with the track of the AKN, which continues to be used for freight.

In 1947, more than three million passengers were carried for the first time. The exact number was 3,517,733. In 1967, the number had fallen to 2.84973 million. When it became part of the Hamburger Verkehrsverbund (Hamburg Transport Association, HVV) numbers rose to 4.21393 million passengers in 1974.

== Freight ==
10,000 tonnes were carried in the first year. The biggest users were peat manufacturers.

Initially, there was no direct transfer traffic with the state railway, all freight had to be transhipped. Transfer between the systems became possible in 1902. The line had 22 railway sidings with a total of 13.59 km of track in 1934.

560,000 tons of freight was carried in 1940, but it had fallen to 348,000 tons in 1950.

Since 1 January 2008, the remaining freight traffic (mainly transfers from the main line of the Norderstedt industrial railway and from Boostedt station) has been carried by DB Schenker Rail.

== Rolling stock ==
Since the beginning of operations until the end of the Second World War, the AKN had a total of 28 steam locomotives, which handled all traffic until the arrival of the first railcars, built in 1930. Two more railcars were added before the end of the war. Five Esslingen railbuses were introduced for passenger services in 1951, which operated until 1963. From 1956 to 1963, MAN delivered ten more railbuses and an additional four Uerdingen railbuses were added. A total of ten control cars achieved the required capacity. In 1927 the AKN had 25 biaxial and five triaxial carriages, seven of which were also equipped for the carriage of mail. 42 covered and 72 open wagons were acquired from Deutsche Reichsbahn. Seven milk wagons carried the daily milk shipments. By 1960, this pool of rollingstock had changed only slightly. Milk wagons no longer appear in the statistics in 1936. Diesel locomotives operated for the first time on the AKN network in 1948. A total of 20 diesel locomotives operated on this line and the Billwerder area in Hamburg hauling freight until 1972. From 1976, new VTE railcars were operated between Eidelstedt and Kaltenkirchener. Since 1993, new VTA railcars have been used. Eight trains have been given third-rail current collectors, so that they could run on the S-Bahn network.
