= Kaltenkirchen =

- Town
- Flag Coat of arms

- Location of Kaltenkirchen within Segeberg district
- Interactive map of Kaltenkirchen
- Location within Germany Location within Schleswig-Holstein
- Coordinates: 53°50′23″N 9°57′37″E
- Country: Germany
- State: Schleswig-Holstein
- District: Segeberg

Government
  - Mayor: Hanno Krause (CDU)

Area
  - Total: 23.11 km^{2} (8.92 sq mi)
- Elevation: 31 m (102 ft)

Population (2025-12-31)
  - Total: 23,585
  - Density: 1,021/km^{2} (2,643/sq mi)
- Time zone: UTC+01:00 (CET)
  - Summer (DST): UTC+02:00 (CEST)
- Postal codes: 24568
- Dialling codes: 04191
- Vehicle registration: SE
- Website: www.kaltenkirchen.de

Kaltenkirchen (German pronunciation: [kaltn̩ˈkɪʁçn̩]; nicknamed Kaki; Low German: Koldenkarken or Kolenkarken) is a town located 35 km north of Hamburg in Germany. It is part of the Segeberg district, in Schleswig-Holstein. It has about 20,000 inhabitants.

== History ==
First mentioned in the 14th century, it flourished during the Industrial Revolution to accommodate the large number of workers in Hamburg.

During World War II, a temporary airfield protected the northern towns from bombing raids, but during the raids on Hamburg the airfield was destroyed and never rebuilt. Only open fields now remain where it was. A concentration camp was established here from August 1944 to April 1945 as a subcamp to the Neuengamme concentration camp. About 700 prisoners died here.

There was talk of moving the Hamburg Airport to Kaltenkirchen in the 1970s, but this did not materialise.

== Attractions ==
Kaltenkirchen station is well known in northern Germany as being the central node of the AKN railway company (Altona - Kaltenkirchen - Neumünster) trains which link many of the smaller south Schleswig-Holstein towns with the Hamburg underground network. This makes Kaltenkirchen an attractive home for current or potential commuters.

Like many towns in Germany, Kaltenkirchen is constantly being rebuilt by creating new living areas in and around the town. The new railway station has been built to accommodate Kaltenkirchen's ever growing community of workers and tourists.

Kaltenkirchen is largely a bedroom community for commuters to Hamburg. The southern parts of Kaltenkirchen include an industrial area where boiled sweets are produced. Kaltenkirchen has ten schools and is planning a shopping centre around the new railway station.

== Twin towns – sister cities ==
Kaltenkirchen is twinned with:

- Aabenraa, Denmark
- Kalisz Pomorski, Poland
- Putlitz, Germany

== Notable people ==
- Bernd Kortmann (born 1960), linguist and director of the FRIAS
- Aaron Ziercke (born 1972), handball player and handball coach
- Jan Hartmann (born 1980), actor
