= Elbgaustraße station =

Railway station in Germany

Elbgaustraße
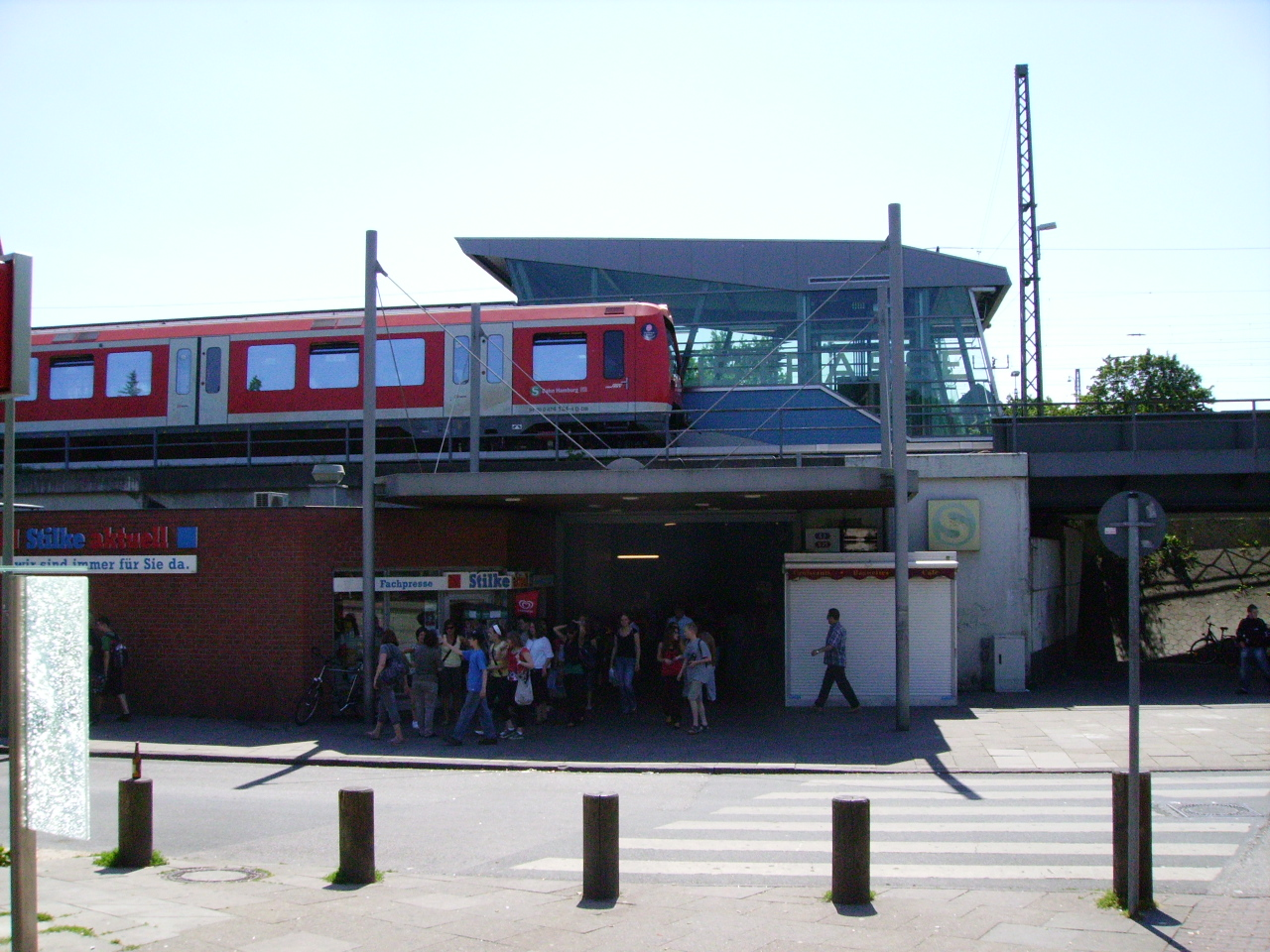

General information
- Location: Elbgaustraße 105; 22523 Hamburg; Germany
- Coordinates: 53°36′9″N 9°53′37″E
- Owner: DB Netz
- Operator: DB Station&Service
- Line: S3 S5
- Platforms: 1 island platform
- Tracks: 2
- Train operators: S-Bahn Hamburg
- Connections: Bus

Construction
- Structure type: Elevated
- Parking: Park and ride
- Cycle facilities: 25 bicycle stands
- Accessible: Yes

Other information
- Station code: ds100: AEGS; DB station code: 1542; Type: Bf Category: 4
- Fare zone: HVV: A/201 and 203

History
- Rebuilt: 1965
- Electrified: 26 September 1965; 60 years ago

Services
Preceding station	Hamburg S-Bahn	Following station
Krupunder towards Pinneberg	S3	Eidelstedt towards Hamburg-Neugraben
Terminus	S5	Eidelstedt towards Stade
Location

Elbgaustraße railway station is on the Hamburg-Altona–Kiel line and is served by the city trains located in Hamburg, Germany. The railway station is located in the quarter of Eidelstedt in the Eimsbüttel borough. After on 16 July 1922 the Eidelstedt marshalling yard (Verschiebebahnhof) had opened and, after the Reichsbahn had established railwaymen in company housings in the environs, a first station for suburban traffic was opened. This was already named Elbgaustraße. In 1965 the old platform was rebuilt and electrified for the S-Bahn service.

== Station layout ==
The station is an elevated island platform with 2 tracks and two exit. The station is fully accessible for handicapped persons, because there is a lift and a special floor layout for blind persons.

== Station services ==
=== Trains ===
The rapid transit trains of the lines S3 and S5 of the Hamburg S-Bahn are calling the station. The station is a terminus for the S5.

Direction of the trains on track 1 is Pinneberg (S3). On track 2 the trains are traveling in the direction Neugraben (S3) and Stade (S5) via Hamburg central station. The S3 needs 33 minutes to the central station, the S5 only 18 minutes via Holstenstraße.

=== Buses ===
Several bus lines are calling a bus stop in front.

=== Facilities at the station ===
A small shop in the station sells fast food and newspapers. There are no lockerboxes. No personnel is attending the station, but there are SOS and information telephones, ticket machines, 25 bicycle stands and 300 park and ride parking lots. In front of the station is a taxicab stand.

== See also ==
- Hamburger Verkehrsverbund (HVV)
- List of Hamburg S-Bahn stations
