= Hamburg-Mitte (electoral district) =

Federal electoral district of Germany

18 Hamburg-Mitte
- Electoral district for the Bundestag
- Hamburg-Mitte in 2025
- State: Hamburg
- Population: 360,300 (2019)
- Electorate: 242,078 (2021)
- Area: 118.4 km^{2}

Current electoral district
- Created: 1965
- Party: SPD
- Member: Falko Droßmann
- Elected: 2021, 2025

Hamburg-Mitte is an electoral constituency (German: Wahlkreis) represented in the Bundestag. It elects one member via first-past-the-post voting. Under the current constituency numbering system, it is designated as constituency 18. It is located in central Hamburg, comprising the Hamburg-Mitte borough and southern parts of the Hamburg-Nord borough.

Hamburg-Mitte was created for the 1965 federal election. Since 2021, it has been represented by Falko Droßmann of the Social Democratic Party (SPD).

== Geography ==
Hamburg-Mitte is located in central Hamburg. As of the 2021 federal election, it comprises all of the Hamburg-Mitte borough with the exception of the quarter of Wilhelmsburg, as well as the quarters of Barmbek-Nord, Barmbek-Süd, Dulsberg, Hohenfelde, and Uhlenhorst from the Hamburg-Nord borough. As they are part of the borough of Hamburg-Mitte, the district also includes the largely uninhabited exclave islands of Neuwerk, Scharhörn and Nigehörn in the Hamburg Wadden Sea National Park.

== History ==
Hamburg-Mitte was created in 1965 and contained parts of the abolished constituencies of Hamburg I, Hamburg VI and Hamburg VII. Until 1998, it was constituency 12 in the numbering system. Originally, it comprised the Hamburg-Mitte borough with the exception of the quarters of Horn, Billstedt, and Billbrook; it included the quarters of Altona-Altstadt and Altona-Nord/Süd from the Altona borough.

In the 1976 election, the quarter of Eilbek from the Wandsbek borough was added. From the 1980 election through the 1998 election, the constituency comprised the entirety of Hamburg-Mitte without the quarters of Finkenwerder and Billstedt, plus the quarter of Barmbek-Uhlenhorst from the Hamburg-Nord borough. For the 2002 election, the constituency was reconfigured. It comprised the Hamburg-Mitte borough without Wilhelmsburg, as well as the quarters of Barmbek-Nord, Barmbek-Süd, Dulsberg, Hohenfelde, and Uhlenhorst from the Hamburg-Nord borough, and Eilbek from the Wandsbek borough. In the 2013 election, the new quarter of Sternschanze was transferred from Hamburg-Mitte to the Hamburg-Altona constituency. In the 2017 election, the quarter of Eilbek was transferred from Hamburg-Mitte to the Hamburg-Wandsbek constituency.

Election	No.	Name	Borders
1965	12	Hamburg-Mitte	Hamburg-Mitte borough (excluding Horn, Billstedt, and Billbrook quarters); Altona borough (only Altona-Altstadt and Altona-Nord/Süd quarters)
1969	12	Hamburg-Mitte	Hamburg-Mitte borough (excluding Horn, Billstedt, and Billbrook quarters); Altona borough (only Altona-Altstadt and Altona-Nord/Süd quarters)
1972	12	Hamburg-Mitte	Hamburg-Mitte borough (excluding Horn, Billstedt, and Billbrook quarters); Altona borough (only Altona-Altstadt and Altona-Nord/Süd quarters)
1976	12	Hamburg-Mitte	Hamburg-Mitte borough (excluding Horn, Billstedt, and Billbrook quarters); Altona borough (only Altona-Altstadt and Altona-Nord/Süd quarters); Wandsbek borough (only Eilbek)
1980	12	Hamburg-Mitte	Hamburg-Mitte borough (excluding Billstedt and Finkenwerder quarters); Hamburg-Nord borough (only Barmbek-Uhlenhorst quarter)
1983	12	Hamburg-Mitte	Hamburg-Mitte borough (excluding Billstedt and Finkenwerder quarters); Hamburg-Nord borough (only Barmbek-Uhlenhorst quarter)
1987	12	Hamburg-Mitte	Hamburg-Mitte borough (excluding Billstedt and Finkenwerder quarters); Hamburg-Nord borough (only Barmbek-Uhlenhorst quarter)
1990	12	Hamburg-Mitte	Hamburg-Mitte borough (excluding Billstedt and Finkenwerder quarters); Hamburg-Nord borough (only Barmbek-Uhlenhorst quarter)
1994	12	Hamburg-Mitte	Hamburg-Mitte borough (excluding Billstedt and Finkenwerder quarters); Hamburg-Nord borough (only Barmbek-Uhlenhorst quarter)
1998	12	Hamburg-Mitte	Hamburg-Mitte borough (excluding Billstedt and Finkenwerder quarters); Hamburg-Nord borough (only Barmbek-Uhlenhorst quarter)
2002	19	Hamburg-Mitte	Hamburg-Mitte borough (excluding Wilhelmsburg quarter); Hamburg-Nord borough (only Barmbek-Nord, Barmbek-Süd, Dulsberg, Hohenfelde, and Uhlenhorst quarters); Wandsbek borough (only Eilbek)
2005	19	Hamburg-Mitte	Hamburg-Mitte borough (excluding Wilhelmsburg quarter); Hamburg-Nord borough (only Barmbek-Nord, Barmbek-Süd, Dulsberg, Hohenfelde, and Uhlenhorst quarters); Wandsbek borough (only Eilbek)
2009	19	Hamburg-Mitte	Hamburg-Mitte borough (excluding Wilhelmsburg quarter); Hamburg-Nord borough (only Barmbek-Nord, Barmbek-Süd, Dulsberg, Hohenfelde, and Uhlenhorst quarters); Wandsbek borough (only Eilbek)
2013	18	Hamburg-Mitte	Hamburg-Mitte borough (excluding Wilhelmsburg quarter); Hamburg-Nord borough (only Barmbek-Nord, Barmbek-Süd, Dulsberg, Hohenfelde, and Uhlenhorst quarters); Wandsbek borough (only Eilbek)
2017	18	Hamburg-Mitte	Hamburg-Mitte borough (excluding Wilhelmsburg quarter); Hamburg-Nord borough (only Barmbek-Nord, Barmbek-Süd, Dulsberg, Hohenfelde, and Uhlenhorst quarters)
2021	18	Hamburg-Mitte	Hamburg-Mitte borough (excluding Wilhelmsburg quarter); Hamburg-Nord borough (only Barmbek-Nord, Barmbek-Süd, Dulsberg, Hohenfelde, and Uhlenhorst quarters)
2025	18	Hamburg-Mitte	Hamburg-Mitte borough (excluding Wilhelmsburg quarter); Hamburg-Nord borough (only Barmbek-Nord, Barmbek-Süd, Dulsberg, Hohenfelde, and Uhlenhorst quarters)

== Members ==
The constituency has been held continuously by the Social Democratic Party (SPD) since its creation in 1965. Its first representative was Eugen Glombig, who served from 1965 to 1980, followed by Freimut Duve from 1980 to 1998. Johannes Kahrs was representative from 1998 to 2021. Falko Droßmann was elected in 2021.

Election	Member	Party	%
1965	Eugen Glombig	SPD	53.8
1969	Eugen Glombig	SPD	60.7
1972	Eugen Glombig	SPD	64.6
1976	Eugen Glombig	SPD	57.7
1980	Freimut Duve	SPD	57.5
1983	Freimut Duve	SPD	54.3
1987	Freimut Duve	SPD	47.1
1990	Freimut Duve	SPD	47.3
1994	Freimut Duve	SPD	45.1
1998	Johannes Kahrs	SPD	50.9
2002	Johannes Kahrs	SPD	54.1
2005	Johannes Kahrs	SPD	49.5
2009	Johannes Kahrs	SPD	34.6
2013	Johannes Kahrs	SPD	39.2
2017	Johannes Kahrs	SPD	30.9
2021	Falko Droßmann	SPD	33.2
2025	Falko Droßmann	SPD	27.4

== Election results ==
=== 2025 election ===
Federal election (2025): Hamburg-Mitte
Notes:	Blue background denotes the winner of the electorate vote. Pink background denotes a candidate elected from their party list. Yellow background denotes an electorate win by a list member, or other incumbent. A ✓ or ✗ denotes status of any incumbent, win or lose respectively.						
Party	Candidate	Votes	%	±%	Party votes	%	±%
SPD	✓ Falko Droßmann	51,536	27.4	▼5.8	41,803	22.2	▼6.5
Greens	Emilia Fester	40,344	21.5	▼4.5	38,169	20.3	▼7.8
CDU	Christoph de Vries	31,829	17.0	▲3.9	29,588	15.7	▲4.5
Left	Marinus Stehmeier	31,014	16.5	▲7.4	35,750	19.0	▲10.2
AfD	Nicole Jordan	19,898	10.6	▲5.7	19,813	10.5	▲5.4
BSW					8,514	4.5	New
FDP	Max Hauptmann	6,539	3.5	▼4.6	7,745	4.1	▼6.4
Volt	Friederike Delong	4,688	2.5	New	3,022	1.6	▲1.0
Tierschutzpartei					1,826	1.0	▼0.4
PARTEI					1,065	0.6	▼0.8
FW	Nichant Makar	1,467	0.8	0.0	666	0.4	▼0.2
BD					242	0.1	New
MLPD	Joachim Griesbaum	436	0.2	▲0.1	129	0.1	0.0
Informal votes		1,683			1,102		
Total valid votes		187,751			188,332		
Turnout		189,434	77.7	▲3.4			
SPD hold	Majority	11,192	5.9	▼1.3			

=== 2021 election ===
Federal election (2021): Hamburg-Mitte
Notes:	Blue background denotes the winner of the electorate vote. Pink background denotes a candidate elected from their party list. Yellow background denotes an electorate win by a list member, or other incumbent. A ✓ or ✗ denotes status of any incumbent, win or lose respectively.						
Party	Candidate	Votes	%	±%	Party votes	%	±%
SPD	Falko Droßmann	59,229	33.2	▲2.3	51,170	28.7	▲4.8
Greens	Manuel Muja	46,326	26.0	▲13.1	49,791	27.9	▲13.4
CDU	Christoph de Vries	23,231	13.1	▼11.2	19,982	11.2	▼12.3
Left	David Stoop	16,195	9.1	▼4.8	15,593	8.7	▼6.2
FDP	James Blum	14,424	8.1	▲1.7	18,723	10.5	▲1.2
AfD	Nicole Jordan	8,664	4.9	▼2.5	9,100	5.1	▼2.9
PARTEI	Arne Ihlenfeld	4,251	2.4	▼0.4	2,494	1.4	▼0.9
Tierschutzpartei					2,486	1.4	▲0.3
dieBasis	Dennis Sommer	2,940	1.6		2,396	1.3	
Team Todenhöfer					2,019	1.1	
Volt					1,137	0.6	
FW	Ralf Relmer	1,340	0.8	▲0.2	974	0.5	▲0.1
Pirates					905	0.5	
du.					398	0.2	
ÖDP	Sebastian Bollien	704	0.4	▼0.2	370	0.2	▼0.1
Independent	Odin Janoske-Kizildag	564	0.3				
V-Partei3					303	0.2	▼0.1
Humanists					275	0.2	
MLPD	Joachim Griesbaum	194	0.1	▼0.1	70	0.0	▼0.1
NPD	Lennart Schwarzbach	136	0.1	▼0.1	130	0.1	▼0.1
DKP					112	0.1	0.0
Bündnis 21					77	0.0	
LKR					50	0.0	
Informal votes		1,439			1,082		
Total valid votes		178,198			178,555		
Turnout		179,637	74.2	▲2.1			
SPD hold	Majority	12,903	7.2	▲0.5			

=== 2017 election ===
Federal election (2017): Hamburg-Mitte
Notes:	Blue background denotes the winner of the electorate vote. Pink background denotes a candidate elected from their party list. Yellow background denotes an electorate win by a list member, or other incumbent. A ✓ or ✗ denotes status of any incumbent, win or lose respectively.						
Party	Candidate	Votes	%	±%	Party votes	%	±%
SPD	✓ Johannes Kahrs	53,795	30.9	▼8.3	41,551	23.8	▼9.8
CDU	Christoph de Vries	42,149	24.2	▼3.7	40,909	23.5	▼3.3
Left	Martin Dolzer	24,083	13.8	▲4.2	26,109	15.0	▲3.9
Greens	Meryem Celikkol	22,368	12.9	▲0.9	25,164	14.4	▲0.8
AfD	Nicole Jordan	12,728	7.3	▲4.0	13,940	8.0	▲3.7
FDP	Michael Kruse	11,202	6.4	▲4.7	16,255	9.3	▲5.5
PARTEI	Samantha Edsen	4,929	2.8	▲1.8	3,945	2.3	▲1.3
Tierschutzpartei					1,817	1.0	
BGE					1,105	0.6	
ÖDP	Martin Krause	1,090	0.6		613	0.4	▲0.1
FW	Henner Kühne	1,038	0.6	▲0.2	744	0.4	▲0.1
DiB					976	0.6	
V-Partei³					523	0.3	
MLPD	Stephan Brandt	317	0.2		181	0.1	0.0
NPD	Bodo Johlke	316	0.2	▼0.6	348	0.2	▼0.6
DKP					113	0.1	
Informal votes		1,716			1,438		
Total valid votes		174,015			174,293		
Turnout		175,731	72.2	▲7.0			
SPD hold	Majority	11,646	6.7	▼4.3			

=== 2013 election ===
Federal election (2013): Hamburg-Mitte
Notes:	Blue background denotes the winner of the electorate vote. Pink background denotes a candidate elected from their party list. Yellow background denotes an electorate win by a list member, or other incumbent. A ✓ or ✗ denotes status of any incumbent, win or lose respectively.						
Party	Candidate	Votes	%	±%	Party votes	%	±%
SPD	✓ Johannes Kahrs	64,997	39.2	▲4.5	55,721	33.5	▲5.3
CDU	Dirk Marx	46,753	28.2	▲1.4	44,947	27.0	▲3.4
Greens	Katharina Fegebank	19,943	12.0	▼4.2	22,645	13.6	▼3.0
Left	Jochen Hanisch	15,693	9.5	▼3.6	18,124	10.9	▼2.7
Pirates	Michael Büker	5,733	3.5		6,442	3.9	▲0.1
AfD	Kay Gottschalk	5,525	3.3		7,186	4.3	
FDP	Najibulla Karim	2,878	1.7	▼6.1	6,458	3.9	▼7.8
PARTEI	Michel Gérard	1,738	1.0		1,545	0.9	
NPD	Torben Klebe	1,245	0.7	▼0.7	1,257	0.8	▼0.4
RENTNER					790	0.5	
FW	Henner Kühne	700	0.4		589	0.4	
Independent	Stefan Füsers	661	0.4				
ÖDP					417	0.3	▼0.2
Independent	Romuald Jasinski	154	0.1				
MLPD					92	0.1	0.0
Informal votes		2,445			2,252		
Total valid votes		166,020			166,213		
Turnout		168,465	65.6	▲0.5			
SPD hold	Majority	18,244	11.0	▲2.9			

=== 2009 election ===
Federal election (2009): Hamburg-Mitte
Notes:	Blue background denotes the winner of the electorate vote. Pink background denotes a candidate elected from their party list. Yellow background denotes an electorate win by a list member, or other incumbent. A ✓ or ✗ denotes status of any incumbent, win or lose respectively.						
Party	Candidate	Votes	%	±%	Party votes	%	±%
SPD	✓ Johannes Kahrs	56,809	34.5	▼15.0	46,419	28.1	▼13.9
CDU	David Erkalp	43,587	26.5	▼1.0	38,689	23.4	▼0.4
Greens	Farid Müller	27,213	16.5	▲5.1	27,865	16.9	▲1.3
Left	Joachim Bischoff	21,718	13.2	▲7.1	22,702	13.7	▲5.9
FDP	Lothar Hänsch	12,818	7.8	▲4.2	19,105	11.6	▲3.8
NPD	Jürgen Rieger	2,348	1.4	▲0.1	1,822	1.1	▼0.1
Pirates					6,303	3.8	
RENTNER					1,176	0.7	
ÖDP					675	0.4	
DVU					243	0.1	
MLPD					132	0.1	0.0
Informal votes		2,737			2,089		
Total valid votes		164,493			165,131		
Turnout		167,220	66.1	▼7.2			
SPD hold	Majority	13,222	8.0	▼14.0			

=== 2005 election ===
Federal election (2005):Hamburg-Mitte
Notes:	Blue background denotes the winner of the electorate vote. Pink background denotes a candidate elected from their party list. Yellow background denotes an electorate win by a list member, or other incumbent. A ✓ or ✗ denotes status of any incumbent, win or lose respectively.						
Party	Candidate	Votes	%	±%	Party votes	%	±%
SPD	✓ Johannes Kahrs	87,748	49.5	▼4.6	74,573	42.0	▼3.8
CDU	Antje Blumenthal	48,762	27.5	▲1.0	42,351	23.9	▲0.8
Greens	Krista Sager	20,230	11.4	0.0	27,703	15.6	▼1.3
Left	Zaman Masudi	10,869	6.1	▲4.1	13,967	7.9	▲5.1
FDP	Leif Schrader	6,407	3.6	▼1.1	13,806	7.8	▲1.9
NPD	Ulrich Harder	2,433	1.4	▲0.6	2,201	1.2	▲1.0
Tierschutzpartei					1,540	0.9	
PARTEI					727	0.4	
Independent	Torsten Wrage	715	0.4				
APPD					381	0.2	
MLPD					117	0.1	
Informal votes		2,558			2,386		
Total valid votes		177,164			177,366		
Turnout		179,752	73.3	▼1.9			
SPD hold	Majority	38,986	22				
