= Diebsteich =

Former mill pond in Hamburg, Germany

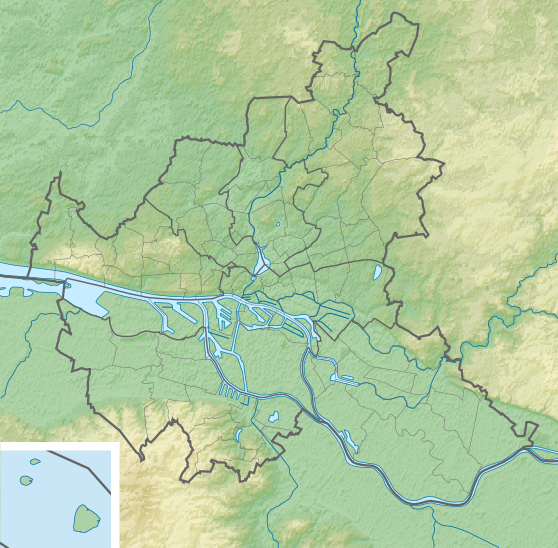
- Location within Hamburg
- Location: Altona-Nord, Hamburg
- Coordinates: 53°33′58″N 9°56′37″E
- Type: Former Mill pond
- Part of: Isebek
- Primary inflows: Isebek
- Primary outflows: Isebek
- Built: 1706
- Max. length: 180 metres (590 ft)
- Max. width: 110 metres (360 ft)
- Surface area: 1.9 hectares (4.7 acres)
- Max. depth: 3–4 metres (9.8–13.1 ft) according to some sources

The Diebsteich (German pronunciation: [ˈdiːpsˌtaɪç]) was a pond around the Hamburg quarter of Altona-Nord. It was located directly west of Pinneberger Chaussee (today: Kieler Straße), which has a detour because of it. It was crossed by the Isebek stream, which flowed into the northwest corner of the pond and left it on its east side. It had a surface area of 1.9 hectares.

== History ==
The pond was originally created in 1706 to build a grain mill called Diebsteicher Mühle by damming the Isebek stream. The mill was located across the road, and held significance for Altona farmers as the city only allowed them to have their wheat milled there. It was expanded further in 1731 and 1747, and an inn was added in 1860. The mill was eventually destroyed in 1943.

Due to being Isebek piped/filled-in around 1912 as part of urban development, the pond eventually dried up in 1913. It was then leveled to build an amusement park called Luna Park Hamburg-Altona, which closed a year later due to World War I. It reopened after the war in 1923, however, it ultimately closed permanently in 1925 due to financial difficulties.

In late 1920s, two sports fields and an Arbeitsamt (today: Arbeitsagentur Hamburg-Altona) building were built in its place. As of 2025, these still stand.

Diebsteich cemetery, the street "Am Diebsteich", and the Diebsteich station are named after it.
