= Isebekkanal =

Canal in Germany

Coordinates: 53.5775°N 9.9736°E

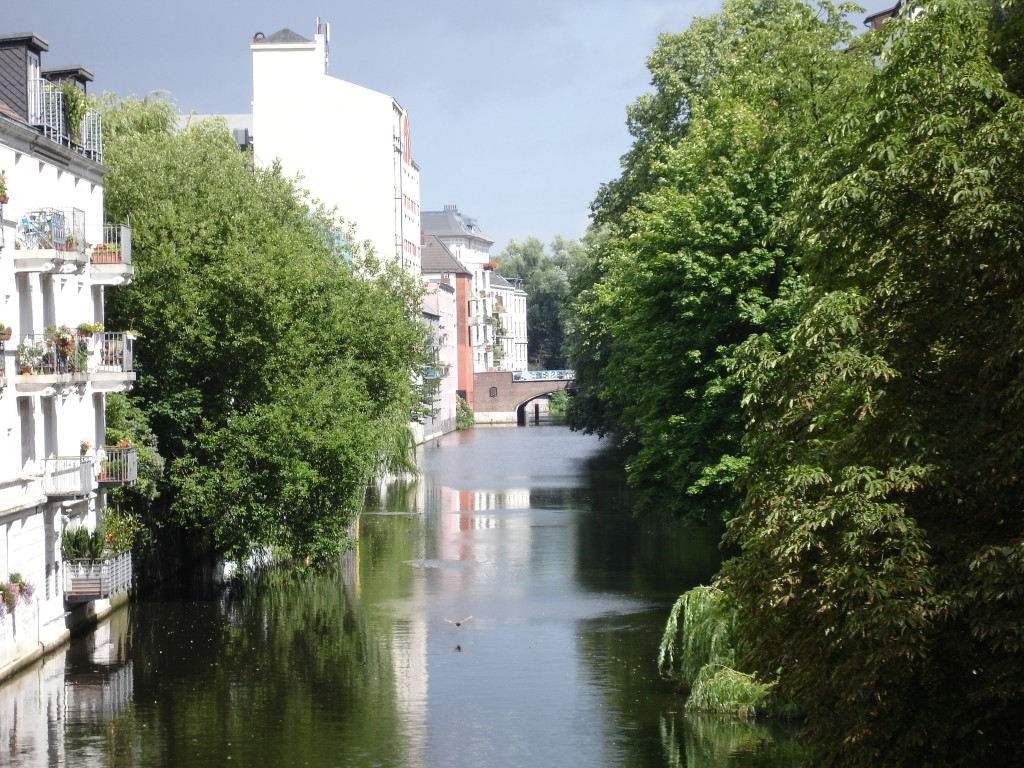
Isebekkanal in 2005

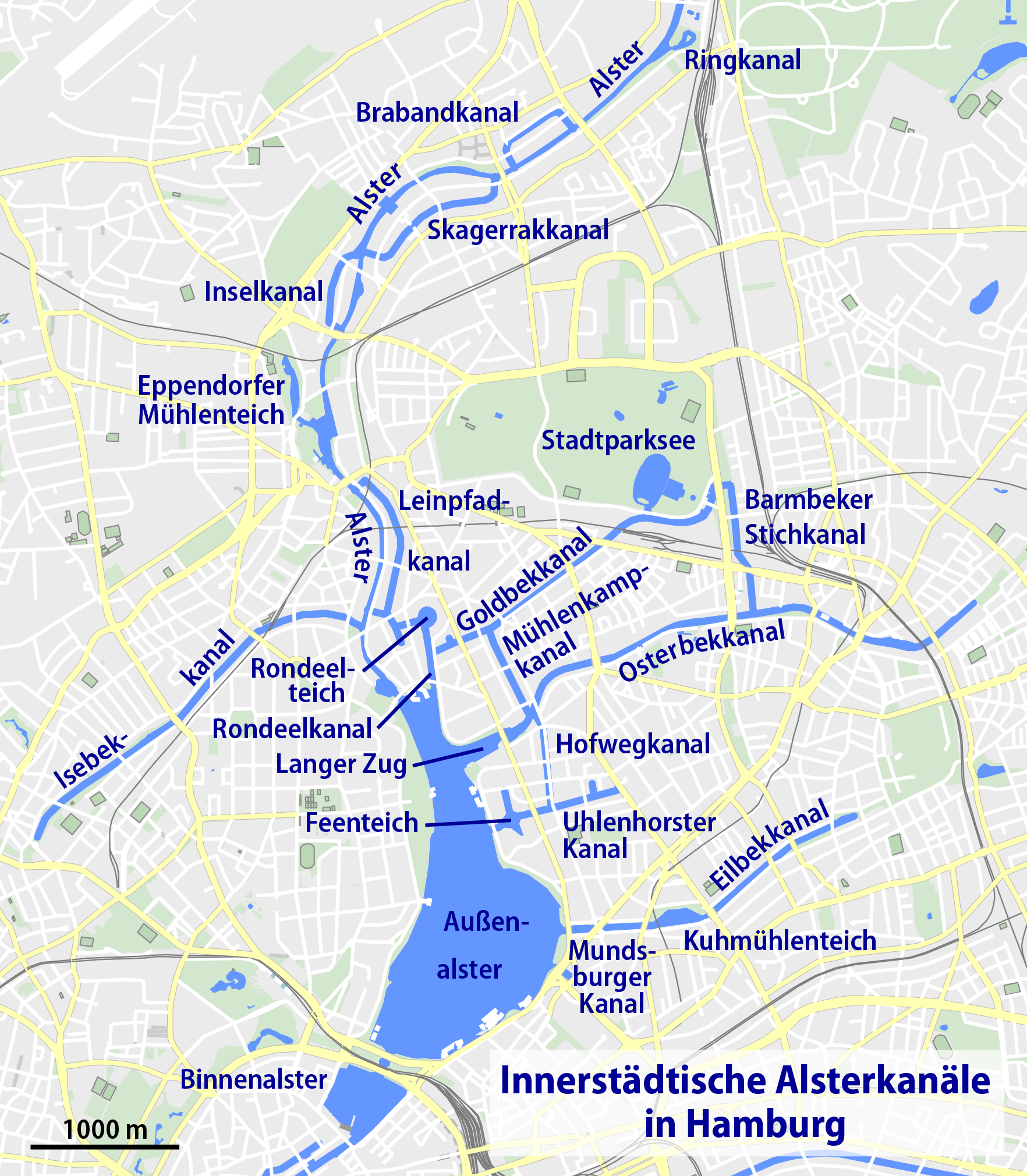
Inner city canals of Hamburg

Isebekkanal (German pronunciation: [ˈiːzəbeːk.kaˌnaːl]) is a canal in Hamburg, Germany. It has a length of about 3 km and is a remnant of the former stream of Isebek. The small Ottersbek stream flows into it. The Isebekkanal flows into the Alster.

== Location ==
The canal is located in the quarters of Eimsbüttel, Hoheluft-West, Hoheluft-Ost, Harvestehude, and Eppendorf.

Isebekkanal, especially the adjacent street of Kaiser-Friedrich-Ufer (also known under the acronym Kaifu) is popular with joggers and walkers, also the public open air pool of Kaifu-Bad can be found here.

== History ==
Isebek means iron stream. The name derives from the high iron content of the water. The iron was supposed to come from a small tributary which rinsed iron out of Langenfelde meadows into former Isebek. Originally, the stream flowed from its source near Bahrenfeld into the pond of Diebsteich (which was located at the street of Kieler Straße) and from there into the Alster. The street names Isebekstraße and Isebekstieg (near today Diebsteich station) remind of the former stream.
