= Altona-Altstadt =

- Quarter of Hamburg
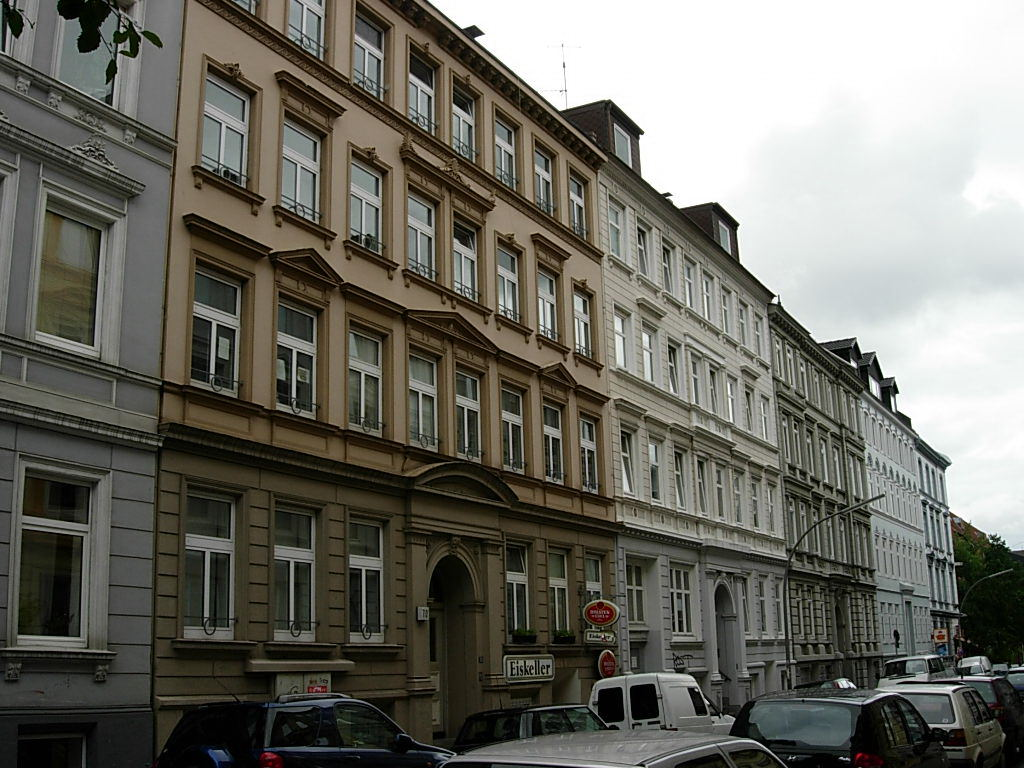
- Virchowstraße
- Interactive map of Altona-Altstadt
- Location within Germany Location within Hamburg
- Coordinates: 53°32′56″N 9°56′52″E
- Country: Germany
- State: Hamburg
- City: Hamburg
- Borough: Altona

Area
  - Total: 2.8 km^{2} (1.1 sq mi)

Population (2024-12-31)
  - Total: 29,680
  - Density: 11,000/km^{2} (27,000/sq mi)
- Time zone: UTC+01:00 (CET)
  - Summer (DST): UTC+02:00 (CEST)
- Dialling codes: 040
- Vehicle registration: HH

Altona-Altstadt (German pronunciation: [ˈaltoːnə ˈʔaltˌʃtat], lit. 'Altona-Old town') is a quarter in Hamburg (Germany) that belongs to the Altona borough. The quarter's boundaries are congruent with the historic center of what has been the city of Altona until 1937.

== History ==
Altona was founded in 1535 and became a city in 1664. In 1713, it was burned down by Swedish troops. In 1937, it became part of the city of Hamburg.

== Geography ==
Altona-Altstadt is located between the quarters of Ottensen, Altona-Nord, Sternschanze and St. Pauli. In the south, it borders with the Elbe river.

== Politics ==
These are the results of Altona-Altstadt in the Hamburg state election:

Election	Greens	SPD	Left	CDU	AfD	FDP	Others
2025	26,9 %	23,8 %	28,2 %	7,4 %	4,0 %	1,4 %	8,3 %
2020	34,0 %	25,0 %	24,2 %	3,6 %	2,7 %	2,1 %	8,4 %
2015	22,3 %	35,2 %	23,8 %	5,0 %	3,0 %	3,2 %	7,5 %
2011	17,7 %	46,6 %	16,5 %	7,1 %	–	2,4 %	9,7 %
2008	17,5 %	41,1 %	13,7 %	21,4 %	–	2,9 %	3,4 %
2004	26,3 %	34,4 %	–	26,5 %	–	1,7 %	11,1 %
