= Holstenstraße station =

Railway station in Hamburg, Germany

Coordinates: 53°33′41″N 9°57′0″E

Holstenstraße
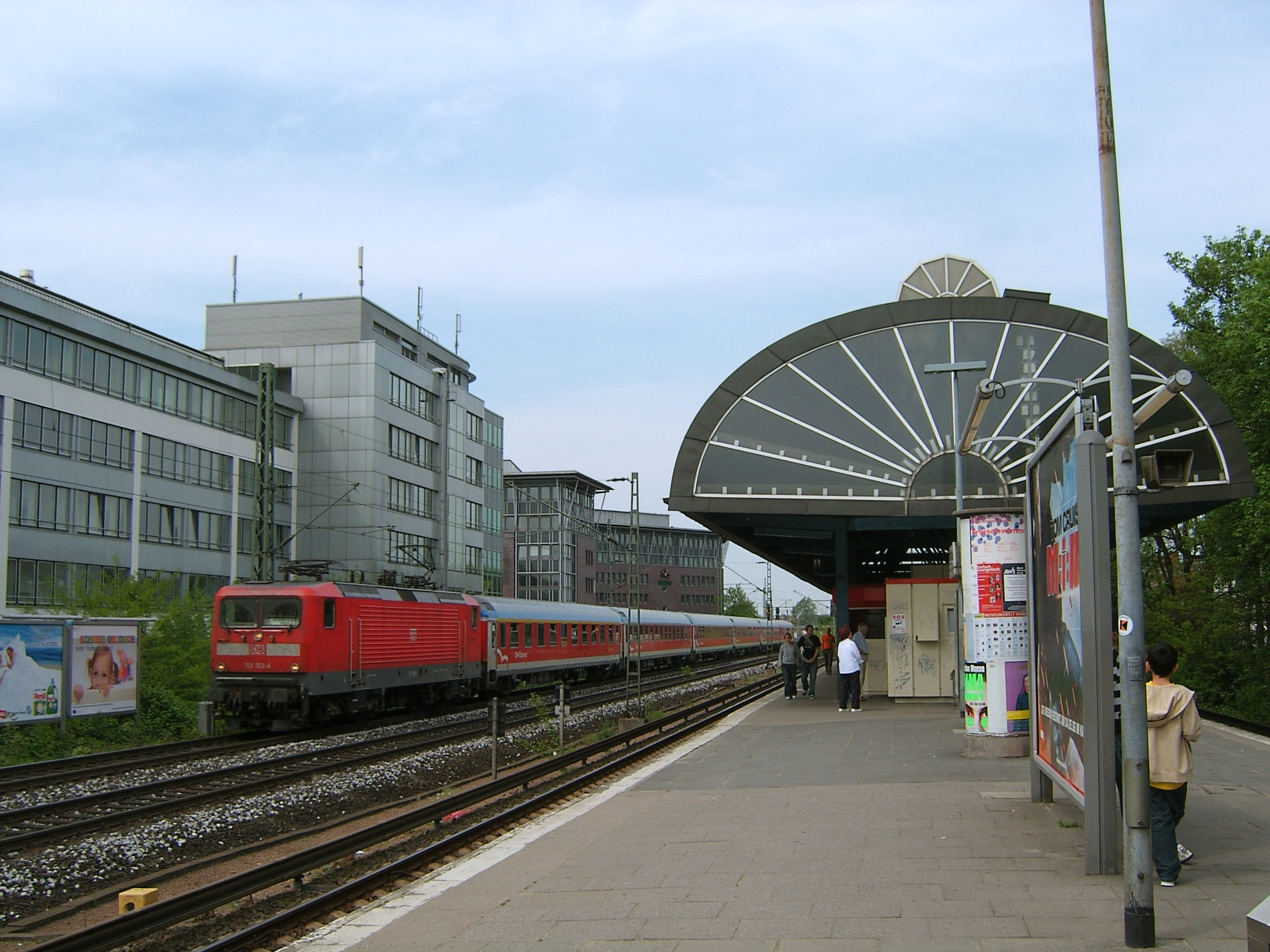
- Holstenstraße station platform

General information
- Location: Stresemannstraße; 22765 Hamburg; Germany
- Line: S2 S5
- Platforms: 2 (island platform)
- Tracks: 2
- Connections: Bus

Construction
- Structure type: Elevated
- Accessible: Yes

Other information
- Station code: 2509
- DS100 code: AHKS
- Category: 4
- Fare zone: HVV: A/101

History
- Opened: 1 May 1893; 133 years ago
- Rebuilt: End 1980's
- Electrified: 29 January 1908; 118 years ago, 6.3 kV AC system (overhead; turned off in 1955); 10 April 1941; 85 years ago, 1.2 kV DC system (3rd rail)
- Former names: 1893-1938 Altona Holstenstraße

Services
Preceding station	Hamburg S-Bahn	Following station
Hamburg-Altona Terminus	S2	Sternschanze towards Aumühle
Diebsteich towards Elbgaustraße	S5	Sternschanze towards Stade
Location
- Location within Hamburg Location within Schleswig-Holstein Location within Germany Location within Europe

Holstenstraße is a railway station in Hamburg, Germany, located in the quarter of Altona-Nord in the borough of Altona. It is served by the rapid transit trains of the Hamburg S-Bahn. The station is managed by DB Station&Service.

The station is situated directly beside the Neue Flora musical theatre and close to the Holsten Brewery. It was the focus of significant media attention in 2005 after people at the station's bus stop allegedly eavesdropped three men planning a terrorist attack, resulting in a large-scale police investigation.

== History ==
On 28 September 1883, a Holstenstraße station was opened for a horsecar line, from Millerntor – near Reeperbahn – to Holstenstraße.

In 1893, the station was built elevated, as an alternate for the at-grade station called Schulterblatt at the current location. The station was part of the link line from Hamburg central station to Altona central station. During the bombing of Hamburg in World War II in 1943, the station building was destroyed and provisionally rebuilt. In the end of the 1980s, the Station was completely renovated, with a new platform building and entrance.

== Layout ==
Holstenstraße is an elevated railway station with an island platform and two tracks. There is no personnel attending the station, but SOS and information telephones and ticket machines are available. Through a lift the station is accessible for handicapped persons.

Tracks of the long distance and regional trains are separated, these trains do not stop at Holstenstraße station.

== Services ==
The station is served by the line S2 and S5 of the Hamburg S-Bahn. The city trains call at the station every 5 to 10 minutes in the rush hours. On weekdays the service stops around midnight and starts at 4 a.m. On weekend nights the city trains call at the station round-the-clock every 30 minutes.

Passengers can change to several bus lines in front of the station. There is also a taxicab stand. A small shop is in the entrance of the station building.

== See also ==
- Hamburger Verkehrsverbund
