= Barmbek =

Coordinates: 53°34′58″N 10°02′28″E

Barmbek Barmbeck
- Village
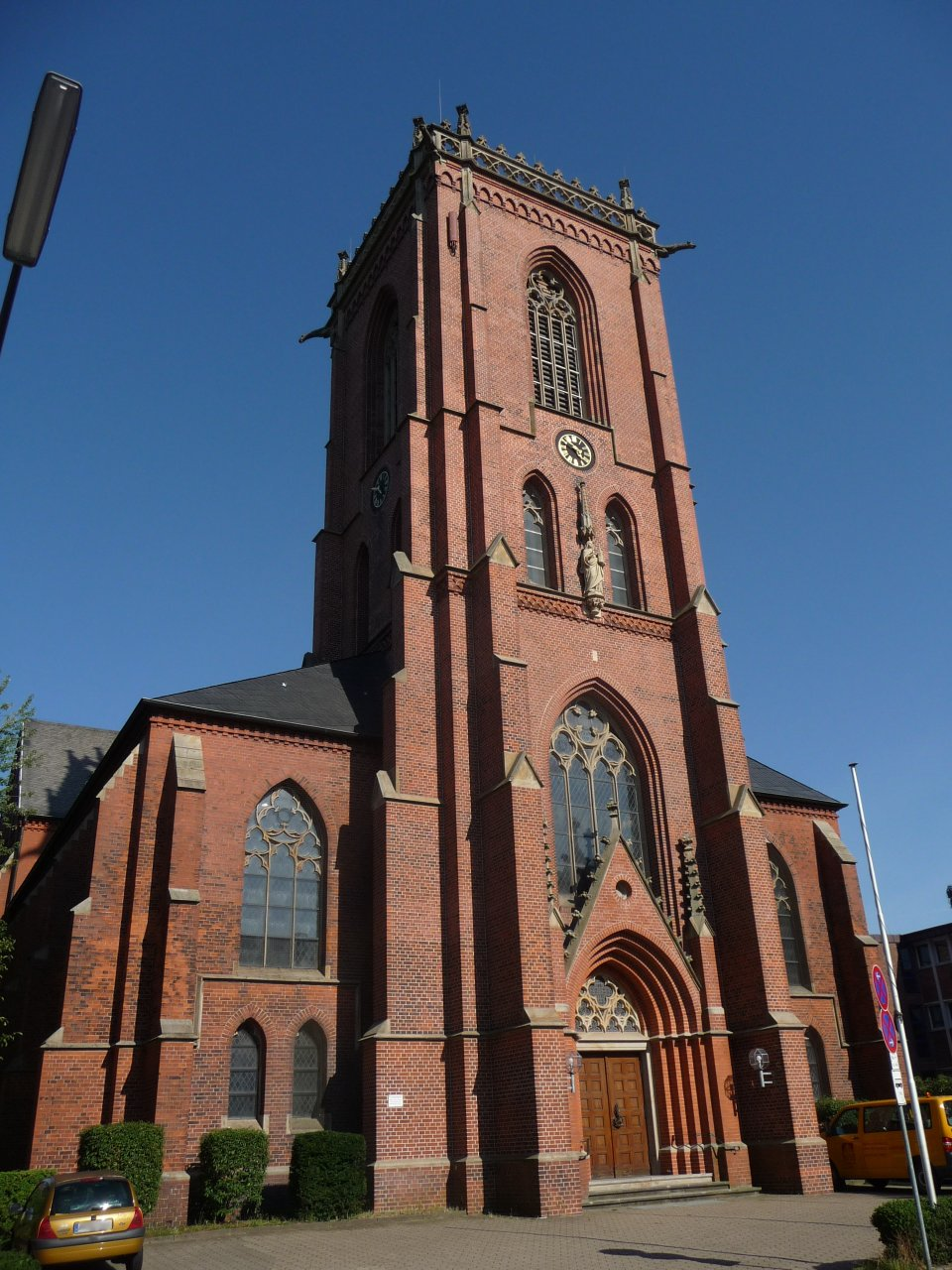
- St. Sophia's Catholic Church built in 1900

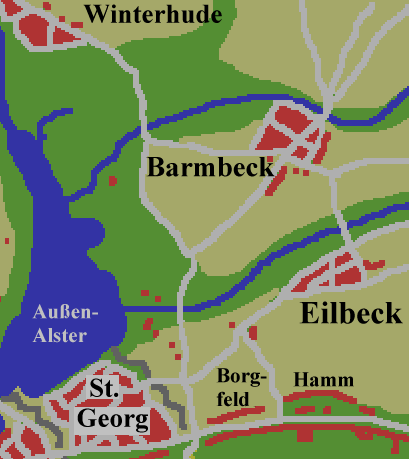
- Map, situation in the north-east of Hamburg around 1800
- Country: Germany
- City: Hamburg

Barmbek (German pronunciation: [ˈbaʁmbeːk]), until 27 September 1946 Barmbeck, is the name of a former village that was absorbed into the city of Hamburg, Germany. In 1951 it was divided into the quarters Barmbek-Süd, Barmbek-Nord and Dulsberg in the borough Hamburg-Nord.

== History ==
It was first recorded in 1271 as "Bernebeke". Up until 1946 it was written with a 'c' as Barmbeck. Barmbeck and Barmbek are pronounced with a long e, similar to the English "Barm Bake". The village of Barmbeck had been under Hamburg administration since 1830, and it became a suburb of Hamburg in 1894, while the area of Barmbek-Nord was incorporated into Hamburg in 1937 with the Greater Hamburg Act.

== Buildings ==
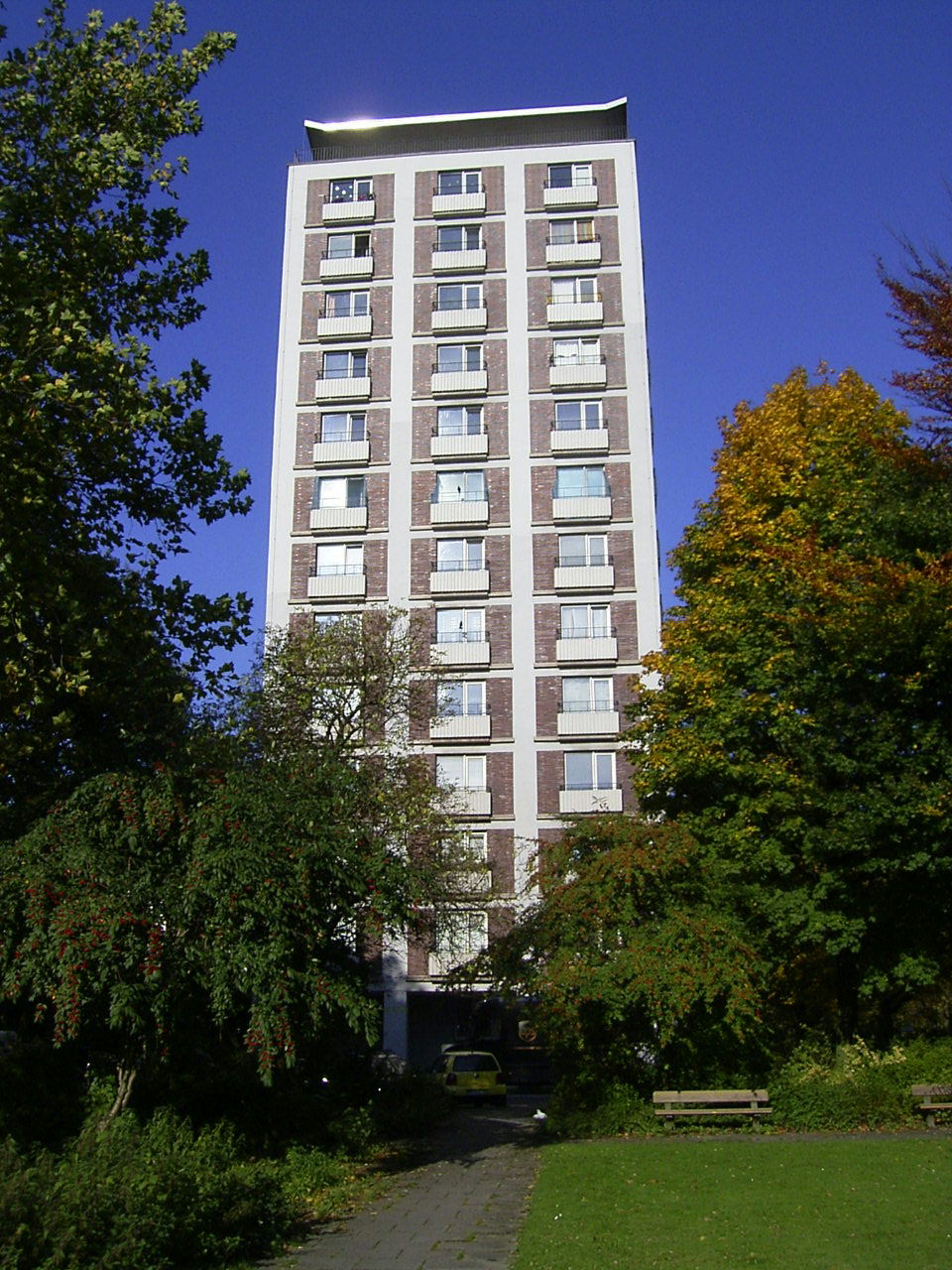
High-rise built in 1955

near Habichtstraße (Hamburg U-Bahn station)

- St. Sophia's Catholic Church
- Evangelical–Lutheran Bugenhagenkirche
- AK Barmbek clinic
- AK Eilbek clinic
- Museum of work
- Barmbek station
