= Barmbek-Nord =

- Quarter of Hamburg
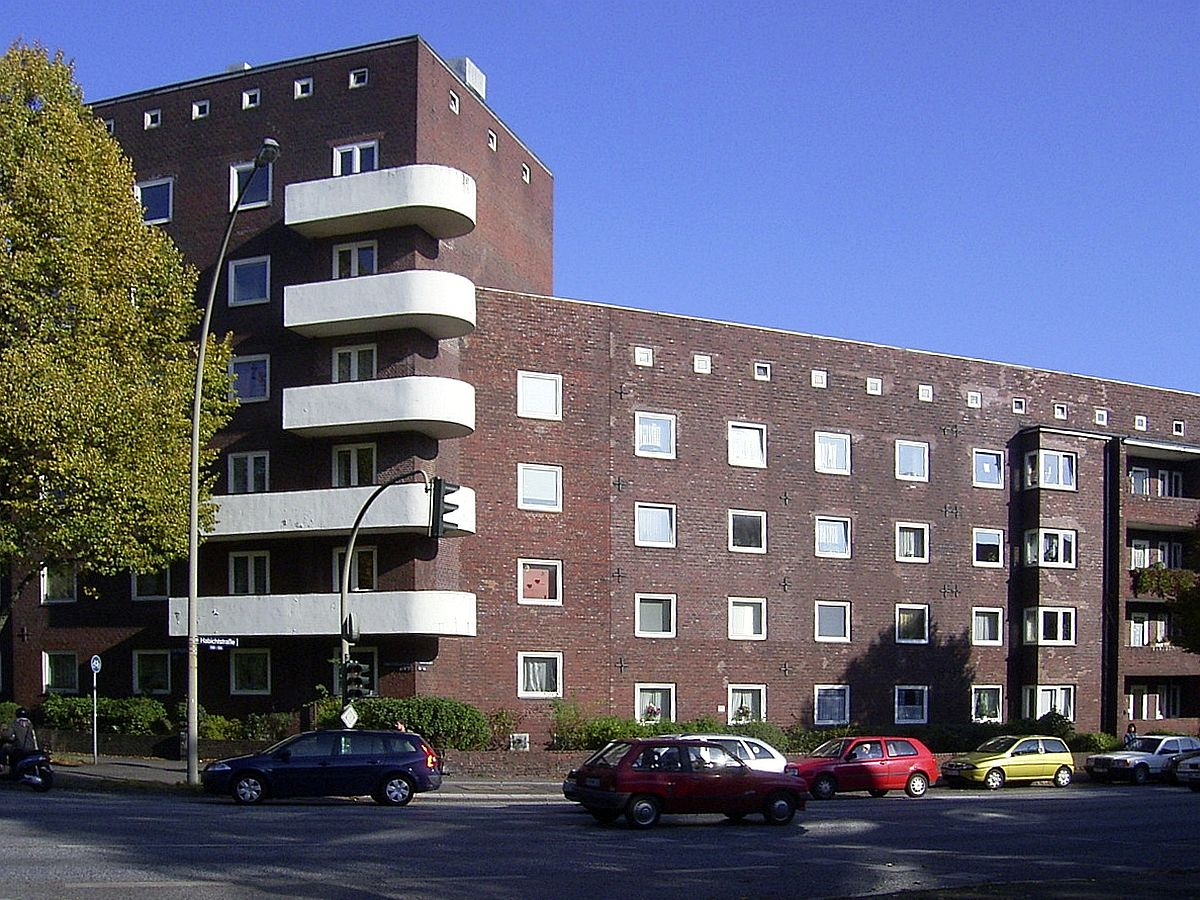
- Typical brick apartment building at the street of Habichtstrasse

- Location of Barmbek-Nord in Hamburg
- Interactive map of Barmbek-Nord
- Location within Germany Location within Hamburg
- Coordinates: 53.6052°N 10.0399°E
- Country: Germany
- State: Hamburg
- City: Hamburg
- Borough: Hamburg-Nord

Area
  - Total: 3.9 km^{2} (1.5 sq mi)

Population (2024-12-31)
  - Total: 44,062
  - Density: 11,000/km^{2} (29,000/sq mi)
- Time zone: UTC+01:00 (CET)
  - Summer (DST): UTC+02:00 (CEST)
- Dialling codes: 040
- Vehicle registration: HH

Barmbek-Nord (German pronunciation: [ˈbaʁmbeːk ˈnɔʁt], lit. 'Barmbek-North') is a quarter of Hamburg, Germany, in the borough of Hamburg-Nord. It is located in the east of Hamburg-Nord, approximately five kilometers from Hamburg city center. Barmbek-Nord is a densely built-up area.

Barmbek-Nord borders the quarters of Ohlsdorf, Steilshoop, Bramfeld, Wandsbek, Dulsberg, Barmbek-Süd and Winterhude.

== History ==
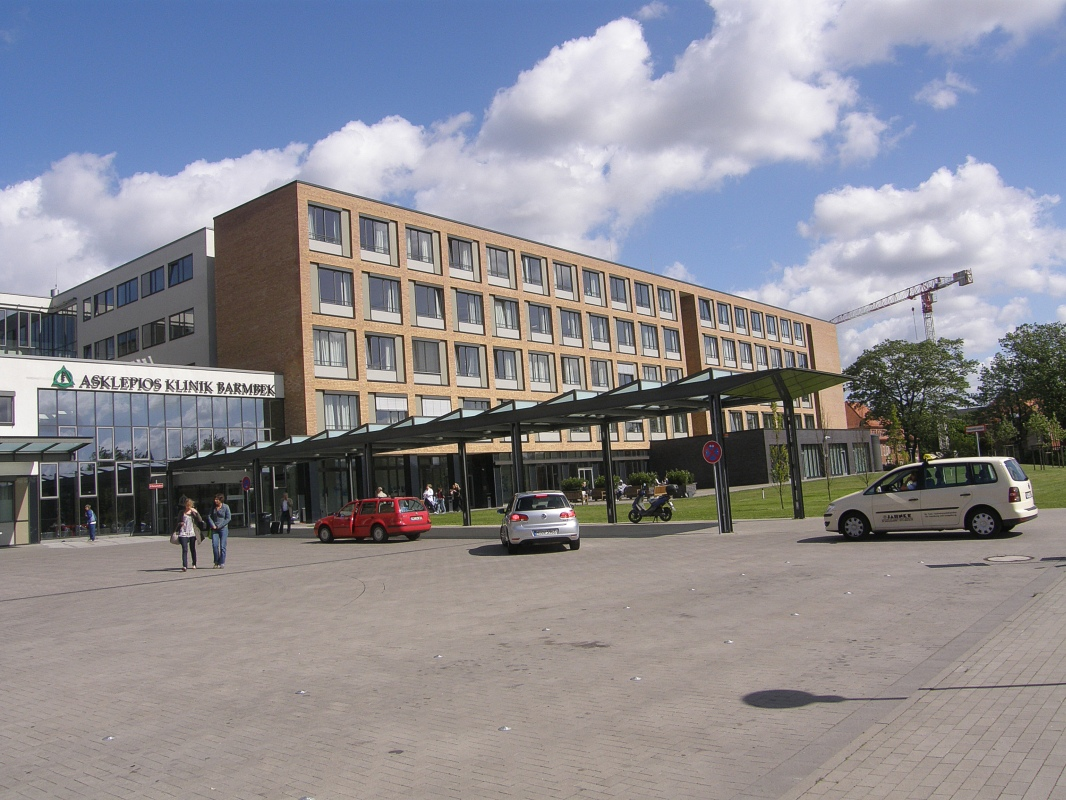
The hospital of Barmbek in 2010

Barmbek-Nord was farmland until the end of the 19th century. A workers' district, its population mainly grew in size during industrialization in the 1910s and 1920s, although it did also have industrial structures itself. In 1907, the Hamburg-Altonaer Stadt- und Vorortbahn (Hamburg - Altona urban and suburban railway, now incorporated into Hamburg S-Bahn) with the Barmbeck station, now Barmbek station started operation. In Barmbek-Nord the stations of Rübenkamp (1913), later Alte Wöhr (1931) opened. In 1912, the Hamburger Hochbahn started operating the first part of the Hamburg U-Bahn circle line from Barmbek station via Mundsburg to central station. In 1930 the track to the station of Habichtstraße opened.

In 1913 the hospital of Barmbek, (Allgemeines Krankenhaus Barmbek, today Asklepios Klinik Barmbek), was also established. Until the incorporation of neighboring villages Bramfeld and Steilshoop 1937 by the Greater Hamburg Act the present-day quarters of Barmbek-Nord and Dulsberg, which were then still named Barmbeck along with Barmbek-Süd, formed a part of the Hamburger eastern border with Prussia. In 1937, Barmbek-Nord became a part of Hamburg, and has remained that way since. Barmbek-Nord faced major destruction during the Bombing of Hamburg in World War II. In the 1970s and 1980s the quarter underwent economic structural change, parts of the population moving away. Meanwhile it turned from a workers quarter into a more family-friendly environment. To date it is a vivid quarter, especially around Barmbek station and the major shopping street of Fuhlsbüttler Straße.

== Politics ==
These are the results of Barmbek-Nord in the Hamburg state election:

Election	SPD	Greens	Left	CDU	AfD	FDP	Others
2020	36,1 %	29,6 %	12,2 %	5,9 %	4,3 %	3,3 %	8,6 %
2015	46,0 %	15,1 %	11,9 %	10,0 %	5,5 %	4,9 %	6,6 %
2011	51,7 %	14,7 %	8,6 %	13,7 %	–	3,9 %	7,4 %
2008	39,8 %	12,1 %	9,2 %	31,8 %	–	3,7 %	3,3 %
2004	36,6 %	15,3 %	–	37,4 %	–	2,4 %	8,4 %
2001	44,1 %	10,5 %	0,6 %	19,3 %	–	3,5 %	22,0 %
1997	43,1 %	16,0 %	0,8 %	21,6 %	–	2,2 %	16,3 %
1993	48,6 %	14,2 %	–	18,5 %	–	2,6 %	16,1 %
