= Hamburger Straße station =

Railway station in Germany

Hamburger Straße
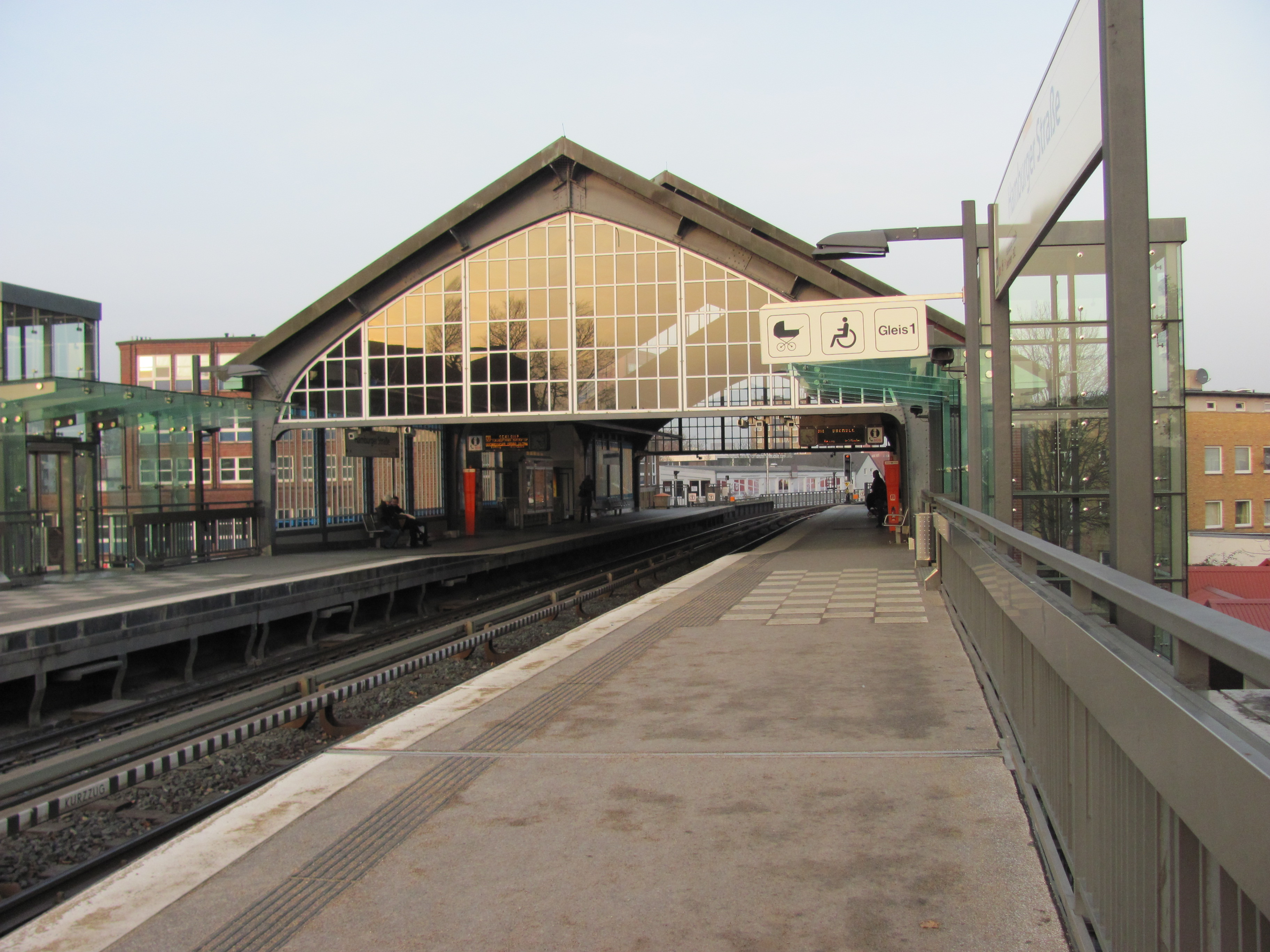

General information
- Location: Hamburger Straße; 22081 Hamburg, Germany
- Coordinates: 53°34′28″N 10°02′14″E
- System: Hamburg U-Bahn station
- Operator: Hamburger Hochbahn AG
- Line: U3
- Platforms: 2 side platforms
- Tracks: 2

Construction
- Structure type: Elevated
- Accessible: Yes

Other information
- Station code: HHA: HS
- Fare zone: HVV: A/105

History
- Opened: 1 March 1912; 114 years ago
- Electrified: At opening
- Former names: 1912-1970 Wagnerstraße

Key dates
- 30 July 1943 - 1 July 1950: Closed (destroyed by Operation Gomorra)

Services
Preceding station	Hamburg U-Bahn	Following station
Mundsburg towards Barmbek	U3	Dehnhaide towards Wandsbek-Gartenstadt
Location
- Location within Hamburg Location within Germany

Hamburger Straße is a rapid transit station located in the Hamburg district of Barmbek-Süd, Germany. The elevated station was opened in 1912 and is served by Hamburg U-Bahn line U3.

== Service ==
=== Trains ===
Hamburger Straße is served by Hamburg U-Bahn line U3; departures are every 5 minutes.

== See also ==
- List of Hamburg U-Bahn stations
