= Freimut Duve =

German politician (1936–2020)

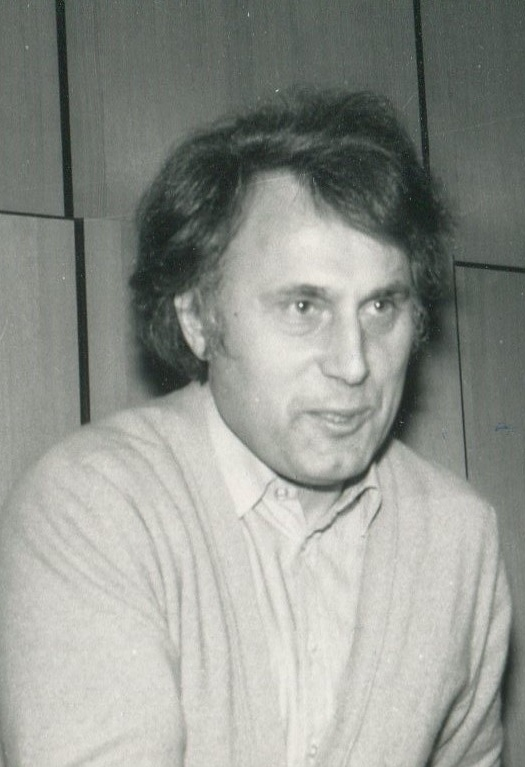
- Duve in 1979

Member of Bundestag; for Hamburg-Mitte
- In office 4 November 1980 – 26 October 1998
- Preceded by: Eugen Glombig
- Succeeded by: Johannes Kahrs

Personal details
- Born: 26 November 1936 Würzburg, Germany
- Died: 3 March 2020 (aged 83) Hamburg, Germany
- Party: Social Democratic
- Education: University of Hamburg
- Occupation: Journalist; writer; human rights activist
- Organizations: Stern; Rowohlt Verlag; OSCE
- Awards: Hannah Arendt Award for Political Thought; Order of Merit of the Federal Republic of Germany

Freimut Duve (26 November 1936 – 3 March 2020) was a German journalist, writer, politician and human rights activist. From 1980 to 1998 he was a member of the Bundestag for the Social Democratic Party of Germany (SPD). He was the first OSCE Representative on Freedom of the Media from 1998 to 2003. He was lesser known on the German literary scene.

== Early life and education ==
Born in Würzburg on 26 November 1936, Duve grew up in Hamburg. He studied history, English literature and sociology at the University of Hamburg. In 1961, he studied Britain's colonial history in South Africa and Zimbabwe. He was the supervisor of foreign students at the University of Hamburg in 1965.

== Political career ==
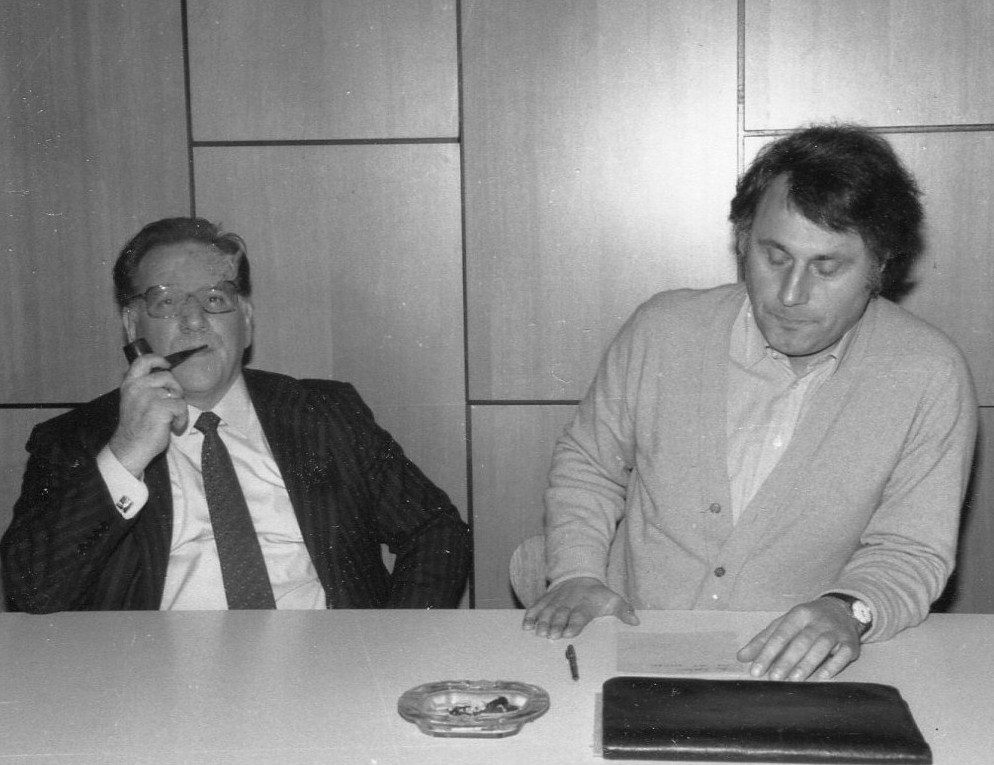
Freimut Duve (right) with Eugen Glombig in 1979

In 1966, Duve joined the Social Democratic Party of Germany (SPD) and became a personal assistant of Helmuth Kern, the Hamburg senator for business. He campaigned for the party together with Günter Grass and Siegfried Lenz. He worked as a political journalist for Stern magazine from 1969 and as an editor for Rowohlt Verlag from 1970 to 1989, responsible for a series of political books, among others. He published political writings by Václav Havel, a manifesto against dictatorship in Portugal by Mário Soares and yearbooks on human rights in Central and East Europe, among others. Duve was a member of the Bundestag for the SPD, directly elected by the Hamburg-Mitte electoral district, from 1980 to 1998.

== Later life ==
Duve was the first OSCE Representative on Freedom of the Media until 2003, being succeeded by Miklós Haraszti.

Duve died in Hamburg on 3 March 2020.

== Publications ==
Duve's publications include:

As author

- Der Rassenkrieg findet nicht statt. Entwicklungspolitik zwischen Angst und Armut. Econ, Düsseldorf 1971, ISBN 978-3-430-12264-1.
- Vom Krieg in der Seele. Rücksichten eines Deutschen. Rowohlt, Reinbek 1998, ISBN 3-49960486-8.
- Kulturpolitik, auswärtig. In: Robert Picht u. a. (ed.): Fremde Freunde. Deutsche und Franzosen vor dem 21. Jahrhundert. Piper, München 2002, ISBN 3-49203956-1, pp. 377–383.

As editor

- Kap ohne Hoffnung oder Die Politik der Apartheid. Rowohlt, Reinbek 1965.
- Die Restauration entläßt ihre Kinder oder Der Erfolg der Rechten in der Bundesrepublik. Rowohlt, Reinbek 1968.
- Technologie und Politik. Das Magazin zur Wachstumskrise. Reinbek No. 1/1975 to No. 16/1980.
- Aufbrüche. Die Chronik der Republik 1961 bis 1986. (together with Friedrich Krotz). Rowohlt, Reinbek 1988, ISBN 978-3-499-15920-6.

== Awards ==
Duve was presented the Hannah Arendt Award for Political Thought in 1997, together with Joachim Gauck. He was awarded the Order of Merit of the Federal Republic of Germany in 2004.
