= Falko Droßmann =

German politician (born 1973)

Falko Droßmann MdB
- Droßmann in 2021

Member of the Bundestag; for Hamburg-Mitte
- Incumbent
- Assumed office 26 October 2021
- Preceded by: Dorothee Martin

Personal details
- Born: 11 December 1973 (age 52) Wipperfürth, West Germany
- Party: Social Democratic
- Spouse: Denny Krienke (m. 2017)
- Education: Helmut Schmidt University

Falko Droßmann (born 11 December 1973) is a German politician who has been serving as a Member of the Bundestag for Hamburg-Mitte since the 2021 elections.

== Early life and career ==
Droßmann grew up as the son of a bus driver and a cleaning woman. At the age of 17, he became a police officer.

Droßmann became a member of the Bundestag in the 2021 elections. He has since been serving on the Defence Committee and the Subcommittee on Disarmament, Arms Control and Non-Proliferation.

In the negotiations to form a Grand Coalition under the leadership of Friedrich Merz's Christian Democrats (CDU together with the Bavarian CSU) and the SPD following the 2025 German elections, Droßmann was part of the SPD delegation in the working group on foreign affairs, defense, development cooperation and human rights, led by Johann Wadephul, Florian Hahn and Svenja Schulze.

== Other activities ==
- Magnus Hirschfeld Foundation, Alternate Member of the Board of Trustees (since 2022)

== Personal life ==
Droßmann has been married to Denny Krienke since 2017.
