= Johannes Kahrs (politician) =

German politician (born 1963)

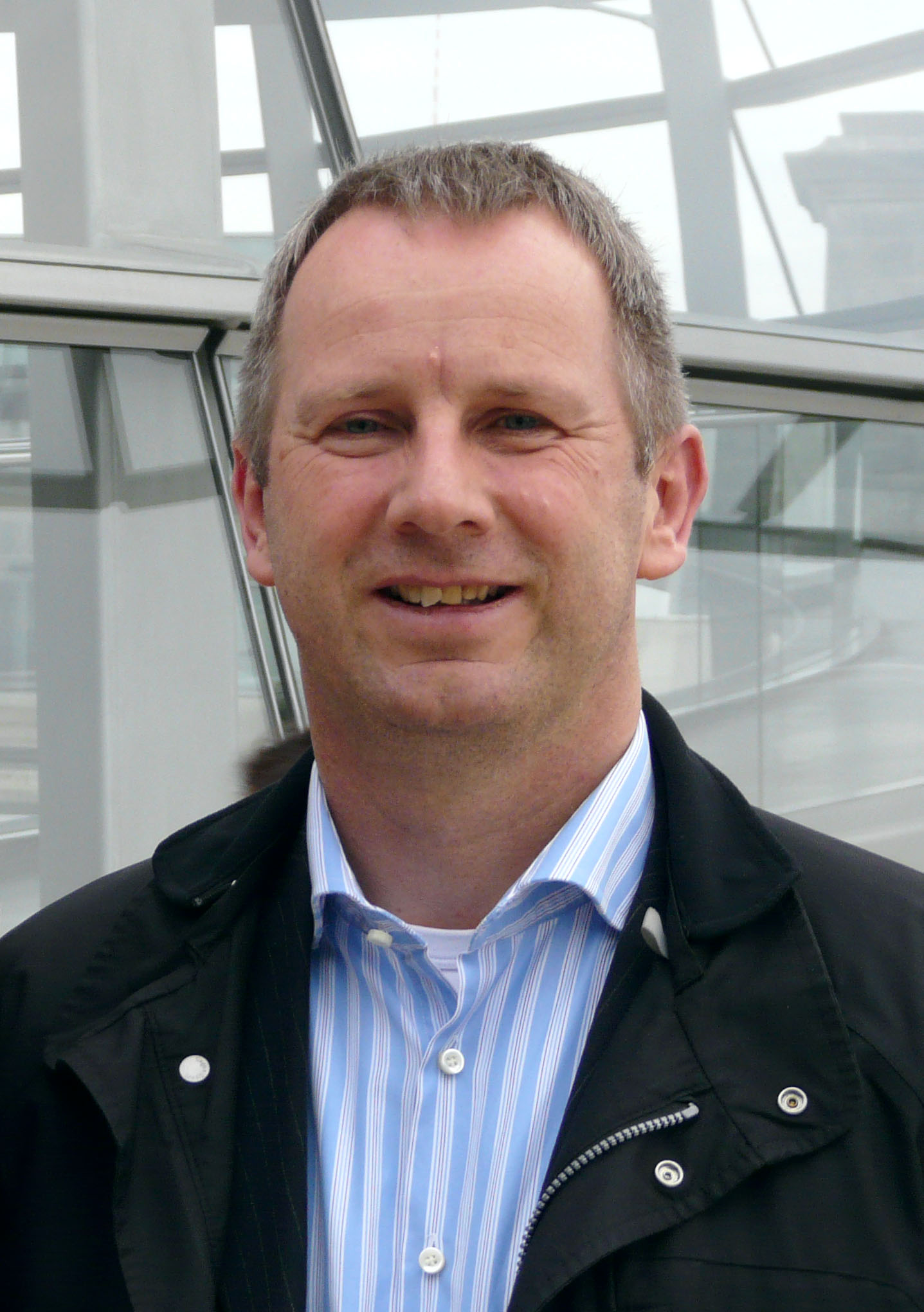
- Kahrs in 2008

Member of the Bundestag; for Hamburg-Mitte
- In office 26 October 1998 – 6 May 2020
- Preceded by: Freimut Duve
- Succeeded by: Dorothee Martin

Personal details
- Born: 15 September 1963 (age 63) Bremen, West Germany
- Party: Social Democratic
- Spouse: Christoph Rohde (m. 2018)
- Education: University of Hamburg

Johannes Kahrs (German pronunciation: [joˈhanəs ˈkaːɐ̯s]; born 15 September 1963) is a former German politician of the Social Democratic Party (SPD) who served as a member of the German parliament, Deutscher Bundestag, from 1998 until 2020.

== Early life and education ==
Kahrs was born in Bremen. His parents are Wolfgang and Bringfriede Kahrs who were both senators in Bremen on the ticket of the Social Democratic Party of Germany. After visiting school in Bremen, Kahrs joined the Bundeswehr and became an officer. Later, he began to study German jurisprudence. During his university studies, Kahrs became a member of Wingolfs, a student fraternity, in Hamburg and was speaker of the organization from 1990 to 1992.

After he finished university, Kahrs worked for the state-owned housing company Siedlungs-Aktiengesellschaft Altona (SAGA). Kahrs is openly gay.

== Political career ==
Kahrs became a member of the Social Democratic Party of Germany in 1982. He first worked for the Young Socialists in the SPD (Jusos). In 1992 Kahrs stood before trial because of the imputation of harassment against a female political rival in the "Jusos". He was sentenced to pay a penalty of 800 euros.

In the 1998 elections, Kahrs was first elected to the Bundestag, representing the Hamburg-Mitte constituency.

During his first term between 1998 and 2002, Kahrs served on the Defence Committee. Since 2002, he has been a member of the Budget Committee and the Audit Committee. In addition, he joined the parliament's Council of Elders in 2002, which – among other duties – determines daily legislative agenda items and assigns committee chairpersons based on party representation. From 2018 until 2020, he chaired the so-called Confidential Committee (Vertrauensgremium) of the Budget Committee, which provides budgetary supervision for Germany's three intelligence services, BND, BfV and MAD.

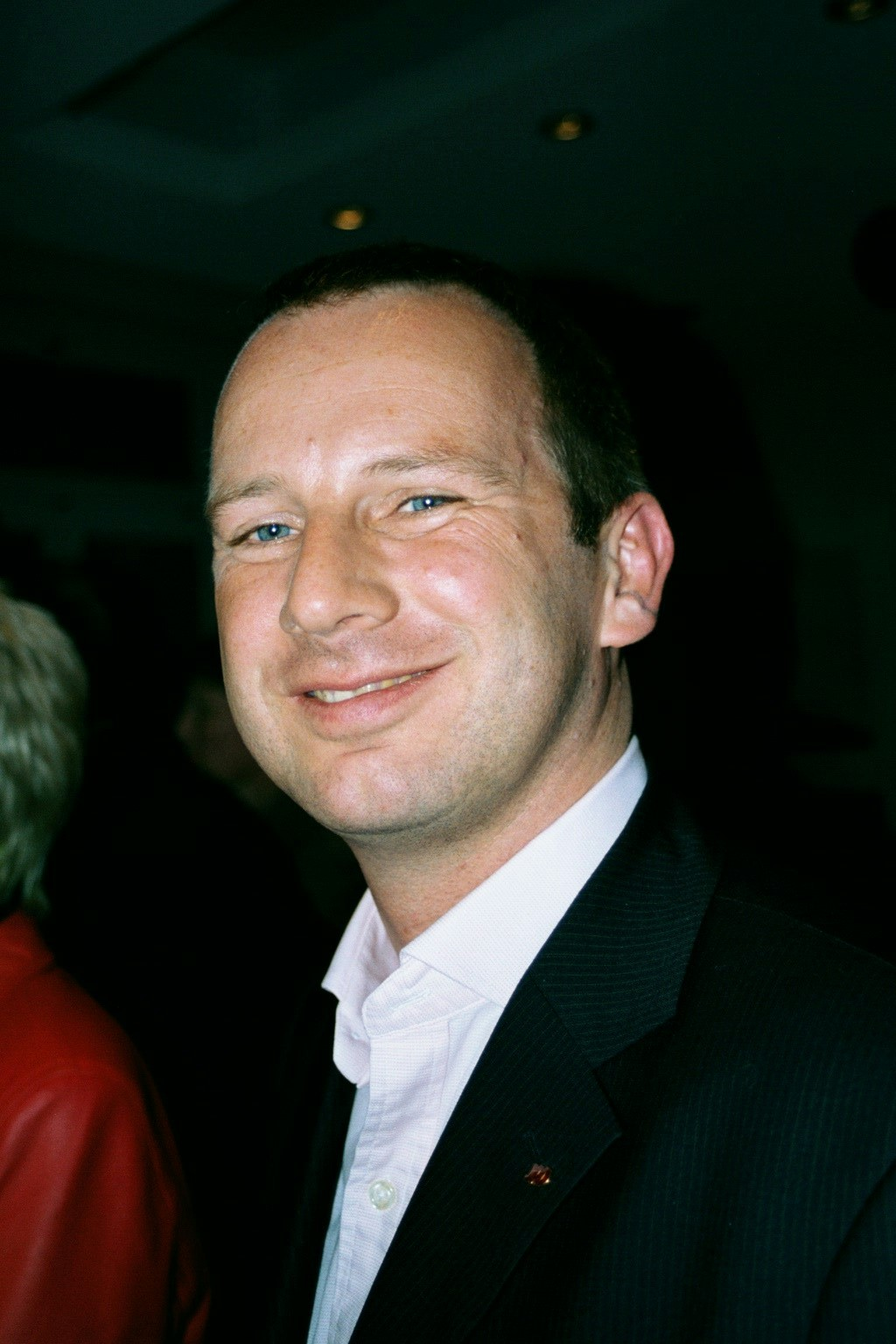
Kahrs in 2001

In addition to his committee assignments, Kahrs served as member of the German-Turkish Parliamentary Friendship Group, first as deputy chairman (2003–2011) and then as chairman (2011–2013). From 2014, he was also a deputy chairman of the Parliamentary Friendship Group for Relations with the States of the Southern Caucasus (Armenia, Azerbaijan, Georgia).

Within his parliamentary group, Kahrs led the Bundestag group of SPD parliamentarians from Hamburg from 2009. In this capacity, he was part of the parliamentary group's leadership under its successive chairs Thomas Oppermann (2013–2017), Andrea Nahles (2017–2019), and Rolf Mützenich (2019–2020). He was also the speaker of the Seeheim Circle.

In the negotiations to form a Grand Coalition of Chancellor Angela Merkel's Christian Democrats (CDU together with the Bavarian CSU) and the SPD following the 2013 German elections, Kahrs was part of the SPD delegation in the working group on banking regulation and the Eurozone, led by Herbert Reul and Martin Schulz.

In 2015, Kahrs served on the supervisory board of the Bewerbungsgesellschaft Olympia 2024 GmbH, the agency in charge of Hamburg's unsuccessful bid for the 2024 Summer Olympics.

Kahrs resigned from his mandate and all political positions on 5 May 2020.

== Other activities ==
=== Corporate boards ===
- KfW, Member of the Board of Supervisory Directors

=== Non-profit organizations ===
- Business Forum of the Social Democratic Party of Germany, Member of the Political Advisory Board (since 2018)
- Helmut Schmidt Foundation, Member of the Board of Trustees (since 2017)
- Friedrich Ebert Foundation (FES), Member
- Rebuild and Relief International (RRI), Member of the Supervisory Board
- German Association for Defense Technology (DWT), Member of the Presidium
- Association of the German Army (FKH), Member of the Presidium
- German Military Reserve Association, Member
- German-Azerbaijani Forum, Member of the Board of Trustees
- Tarabya Academy, Member of the Advisory Board
- Otto von Bismarck Foundation, Member of the Board of Trustees
- Haus Rissen, Member of the Board of Trustees
- Jewish Museum Berlin, Alternate Member of the Board of Trustees
- Jugend gegen AIDS, Member of the Advisory Board
- Lesbian and Gay Federation in Germany (LSVD), Member
- German National Committee for Monument Preservation (DNK), Member
- Reichsbanner Schwarz-Rot-Gold, Member
- FC St. Pauli, Member
- German United Services Trade Union (ver.di), Member
- Magnus Hirschfeld Foundation, Member of the Board of Trustees (2011–2019)

== Political positions ==
Kahrs is a proponent of an accession of Turkey to the European Union.

== Controversy ==
In 1992, Kahrs had a power struggle with Juso member Silke Dose in which he threatened her by calling her phone anonymously at nights. He was identified by a trap installed by the police and was asked to resign from all posts by 50 members of his party but stayed on after paying a fine.

He is known for receiving substantial political donations from the arms industry and for being the center of a political network in Hamburg politics which has allegedly used its power to hinder and promote careers in a way that many journalists have called inappropriate.
