= Dehnhaide station =

Railway station in Hamburg, Germany

Dehnhaide
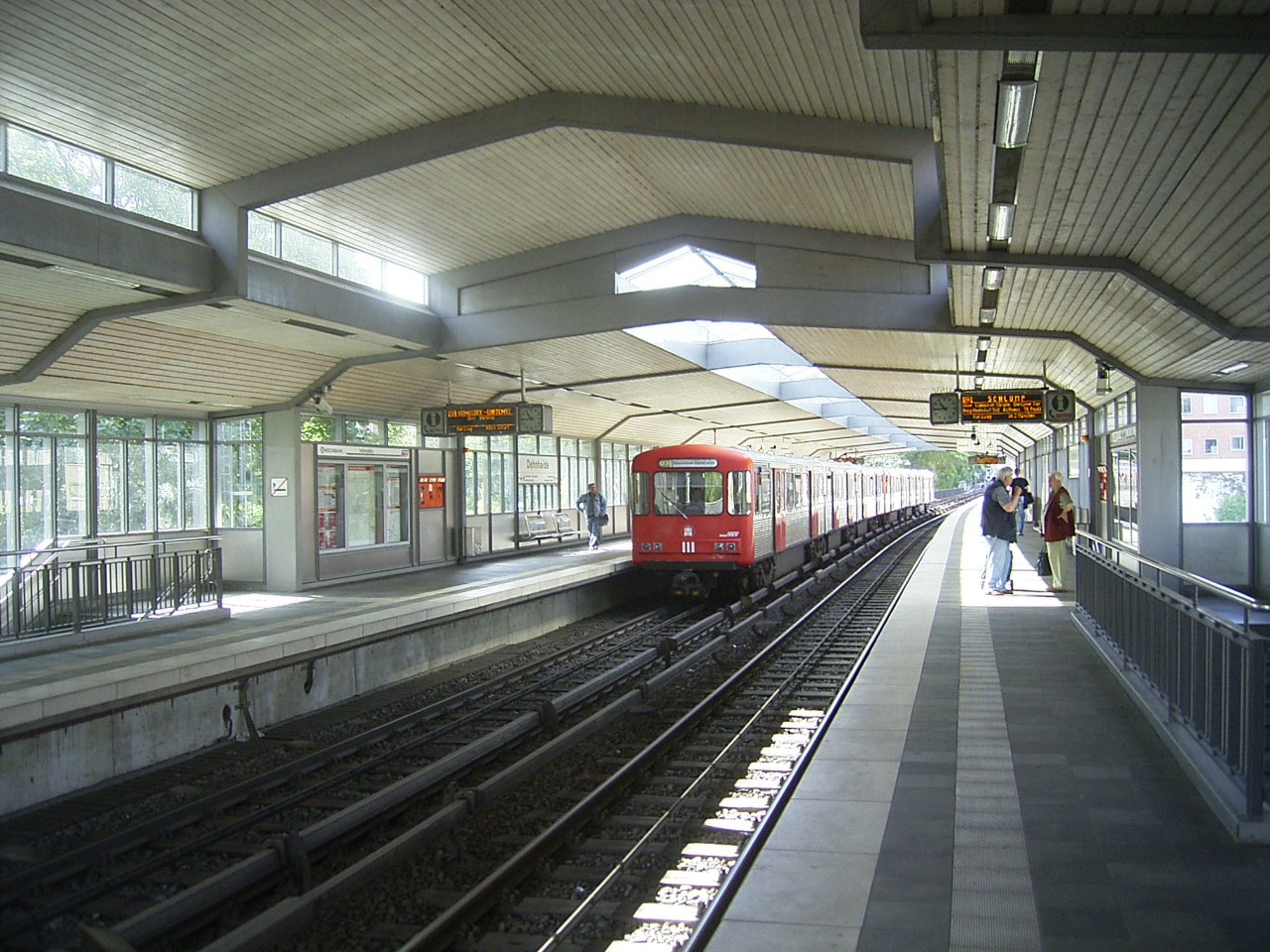

General information
- Location: Dehnhaide; 22081 Hamburg, Germany
- Coordinates: 53°34′45″N 10°02′27″E
- System: Hamburg U-Bahn station
- Operator: Hamburger Hochbahn AG
- Line: U3
- Platforms: 2 side platforms
- Tracks: 2

Construction
- Structure type: Elevated
- Accessible: Yes

Other information
- Station code: HHA: DE
- Fare zone: HVV: A/105

History
- Opened: 1 March 1912; 114 years ago

Services
Preceding station	Hamburg U-Bahn	Following station
Hamburger Straße towards Barmbek via Hauptbahnhof Süd	U3	Barmbek towards Wandsbek-Gartenstadt
Location
- Location within Hamburg Location within Germany

Dehnhaide is an elevated rapid transit station located in the Hamburg district of Barmbek-Süd, Germany. The station was opened in 1912 and is served by Hamburg U-Bahn line U3.

== Service ==
=== Trains ===
Dehnhaide is served by Hamburg U-Bahn line U3; departures are every 5 minutes. The travel time to Hamburg Hauptbahnhof takes about 10 minutes.

== Gallery ==
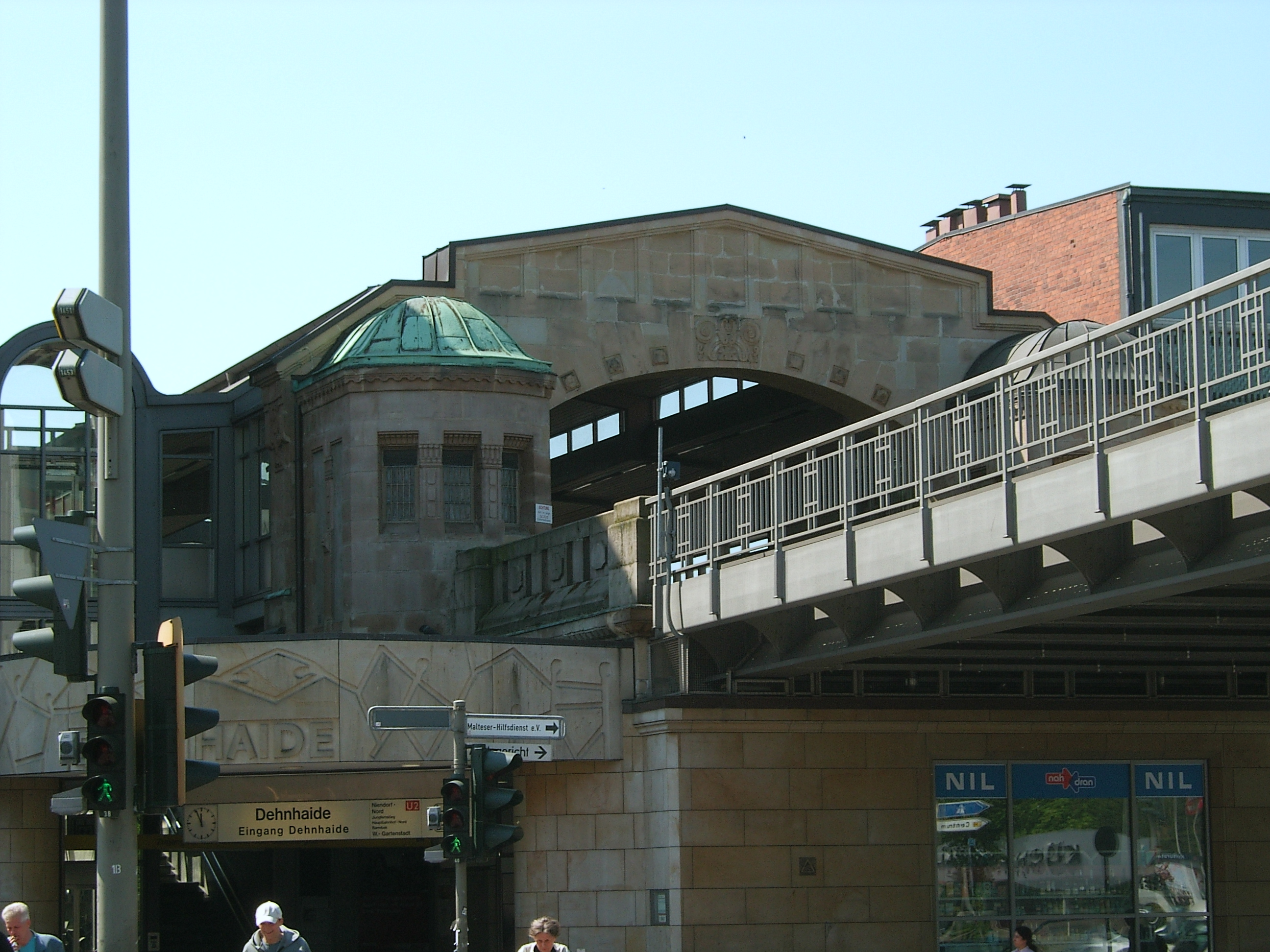
Outside view of the station

== See also ==
- List of Hamburg U-Bahn stations
