= Christoph de Vries =

German politician

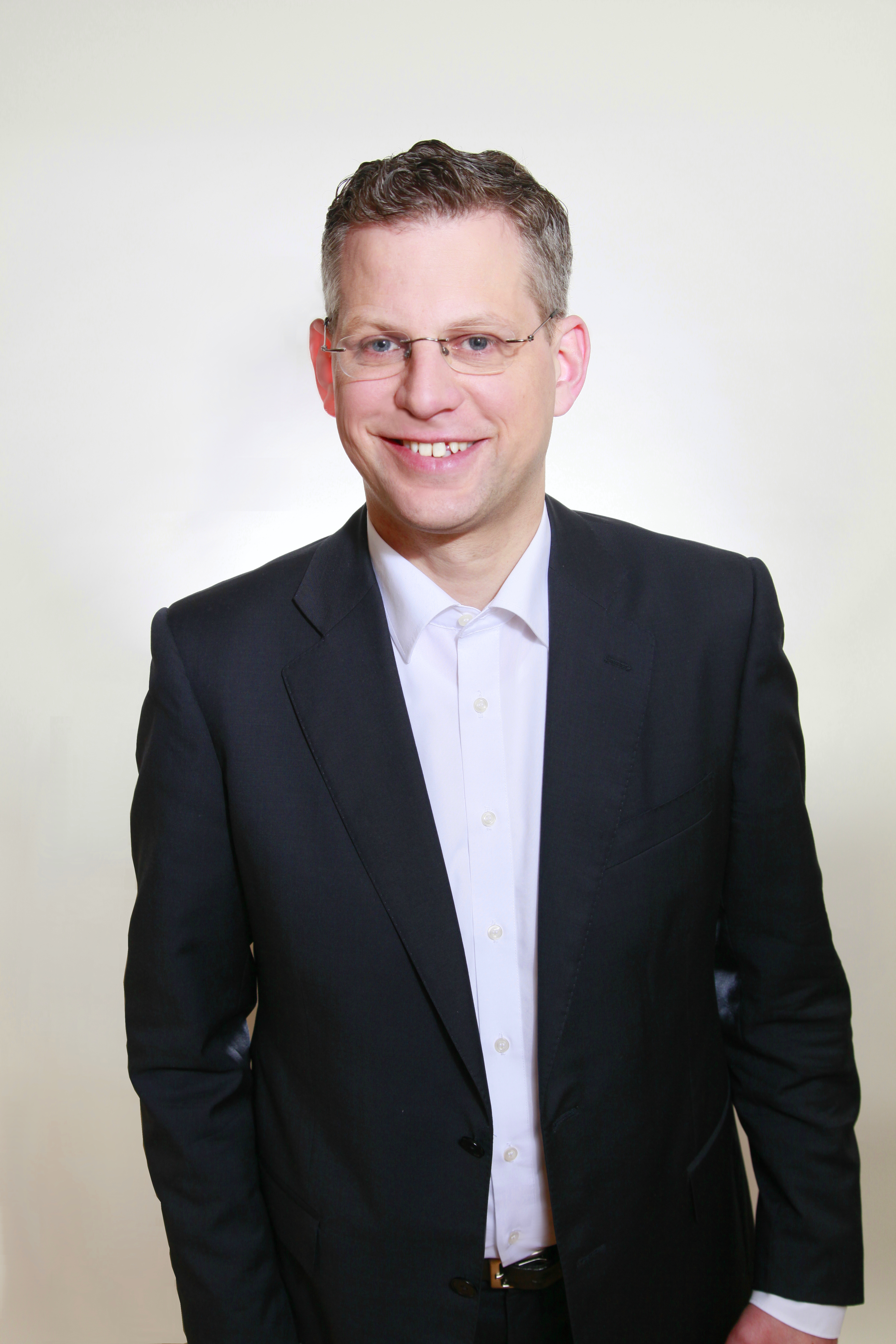
- Christoph de Vries in 2017

Member of the Bundestag for Hamburg
- Incumbent
- Assumed office 24 October 2017

Personal details
- Born: 4 December 1974 (age 51) Hamburg, West Germany
- Party: CDU
- Education: University of Hamburg

Christoph de Vries (born 4 December 1974) is a German politician of the Christian Democratic Union (CDU) who has been serving as a member of the Bundestag from the state of Hamburg since 2017.

In addition to his work in parliament, De Vries has been serving as Parliamentary State Secretary at the Federal Ministry of the Interior in the government of Chancellor Friedrich Merz since 2025.

== Political career ==
From 2011 bis 2015, De Vries served as a member of the State Parliament of Hamburg, where he was his parliamentary group’s on family policy. Since 2016, he has been one of the deputy chairpersons of the CDU in Hamburg, under the leadership of chairman Roland Heintze.

De Vries became a member of the Bundestag in the 2017 German federal election, representing the Hamburg-Mitte district. He is a member of the Committee for Home Affairs. In this capacity, he serves as his parliamentary group’s rapporteur on religious groups. From 2022 to 2025, he was also a member of the Parliamentary Oversight Panel (PKGr), which provides parliamentary oversight of Germany’s intelligence services BND, BfV and MAD.

== Political positions ==
In 2020, De Vries opposed plans to introduce a mandatory quota aimed at achieving equal representation of women within the CDU’s regional and national governing bodies by 2025.

Ahead of the Christian Democrats’ leadership election in 2021, De Vries publicly endorsed Friedrich Merz to succeed Annegret Kramp-Karrenbauer as the party’s chair.
