= Mundsburg station =

Railway station in Uhlenhorst, Hamburg

Mundsburg
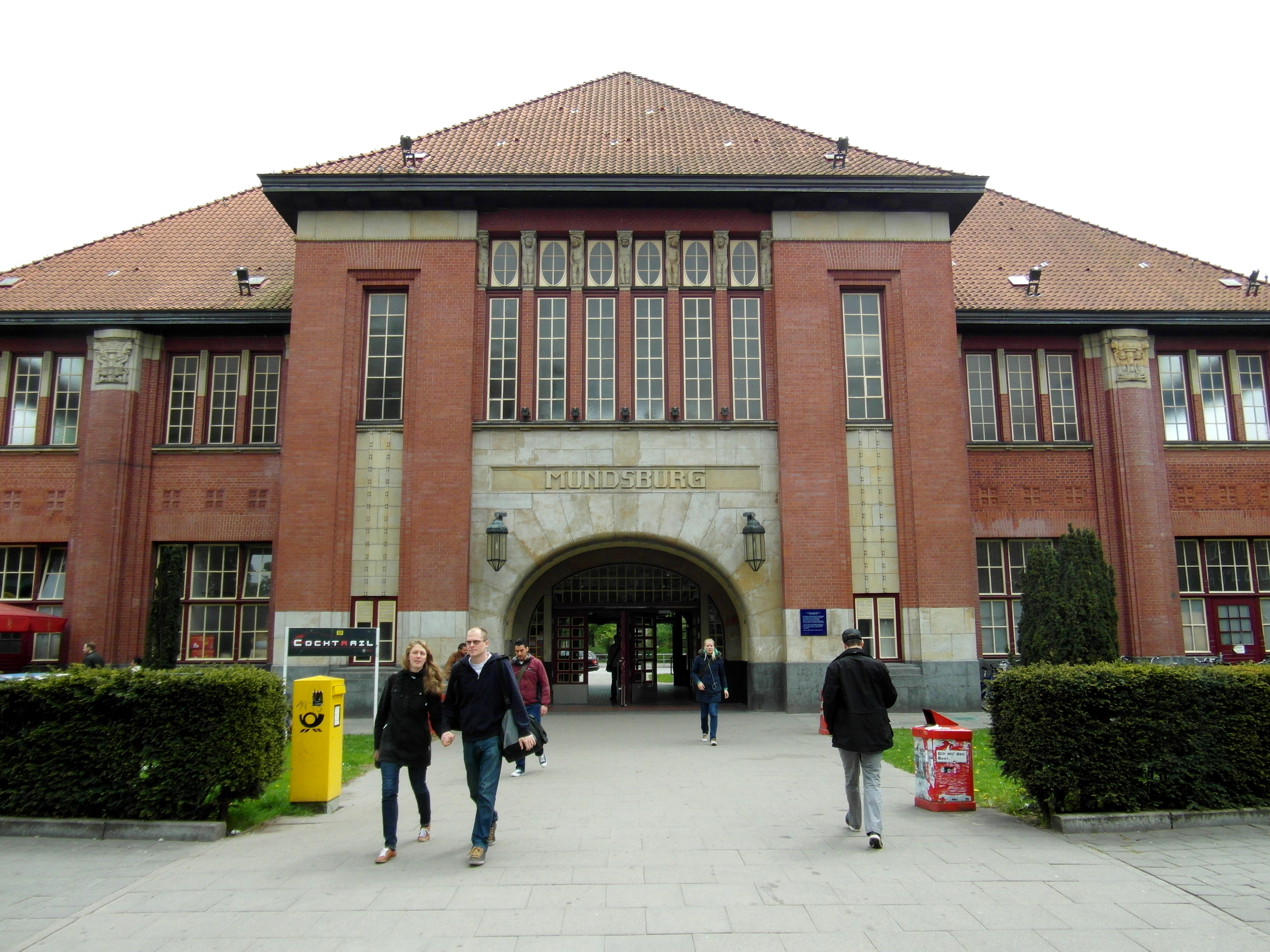

General information
- Location: Schürbecker Straße; 22087 Hamburg, Germany
- Coordinates: 53°34′16″N 10°01′39″E
- System: Hamburg U-Bahn station
- Operator: Hamburger Hochbahn AG
- Line: U3
- Platforms: 2 side platforms
- Tracks: 2
- Connections: Bus

Construction
- Structure type: Elevated
- Accessible: Yes

Other information
- Station code: HHA: MU
- Fare zone: HVV: A/000 and 105

History
- Opened: 1 March 1912

Services
Preceding station	Hamburg U-Bahn	Following station
Uhlandstraße towards Barmbek	U3	Hamburger Straße towards Wandsbek-Gartenstadt
Location
- Location within Hamburg Location within Schleswig-Holstein Location within Germany Location within Europe

Mundsburg is a metro station on the Hamburg U-Bahn line U3. The station was built in 1912 and is located in Hamburg's quarter of Barmbek-Süd, Germany.

== Service ==
Mundsburg is served by Hamburg U-Bahn line U3; departures are every 5 minutes.

== Gallery ==
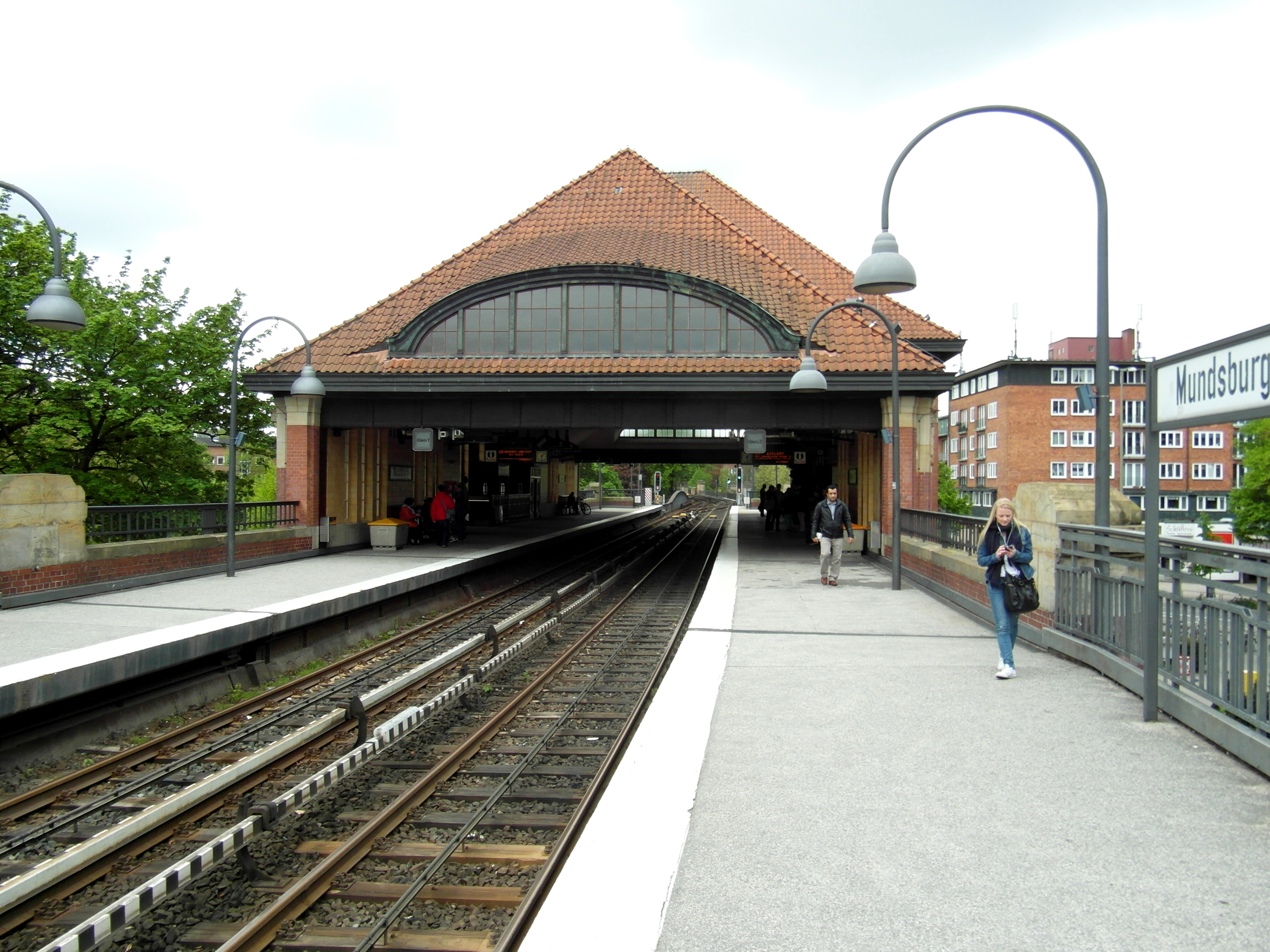

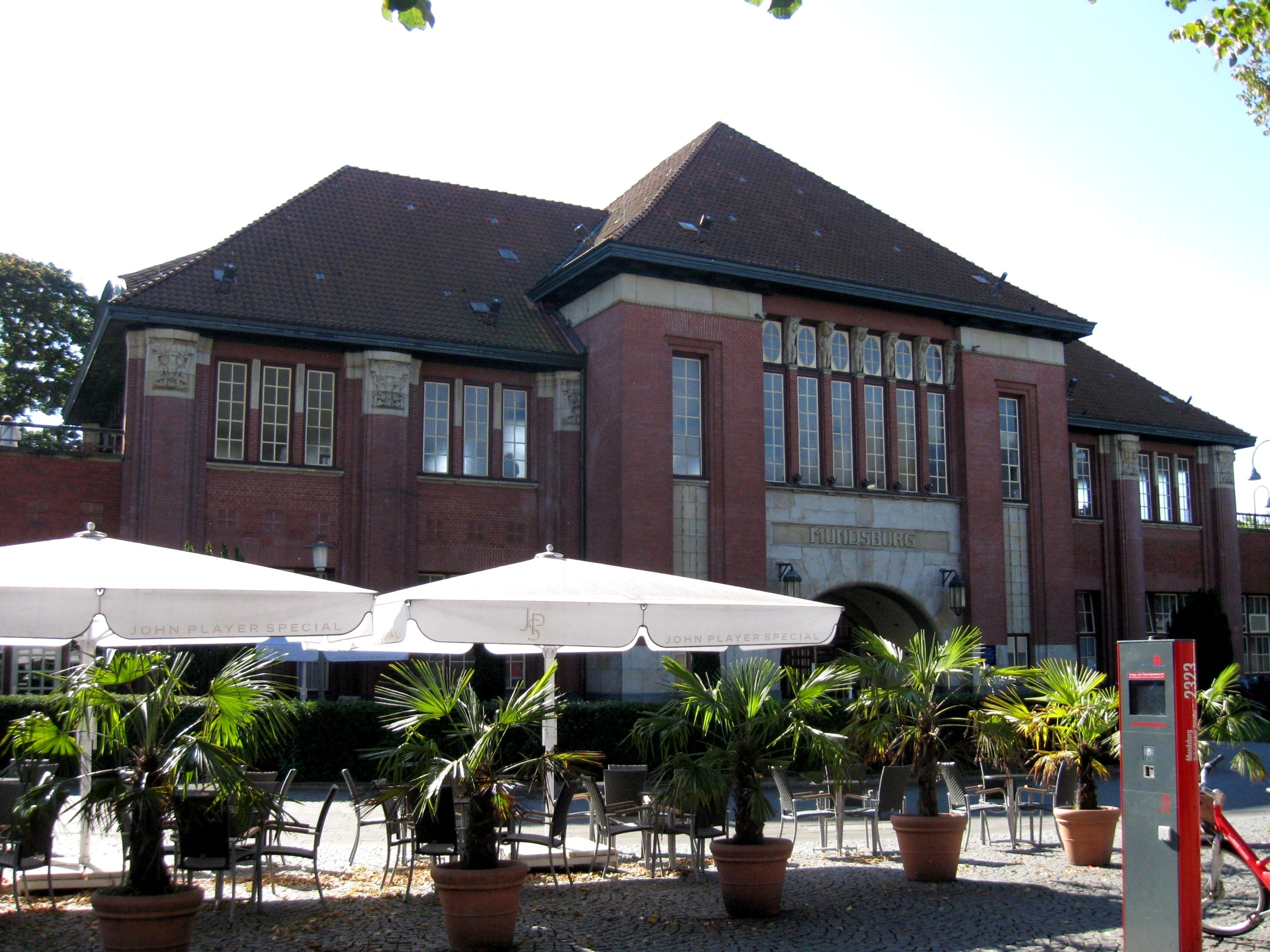

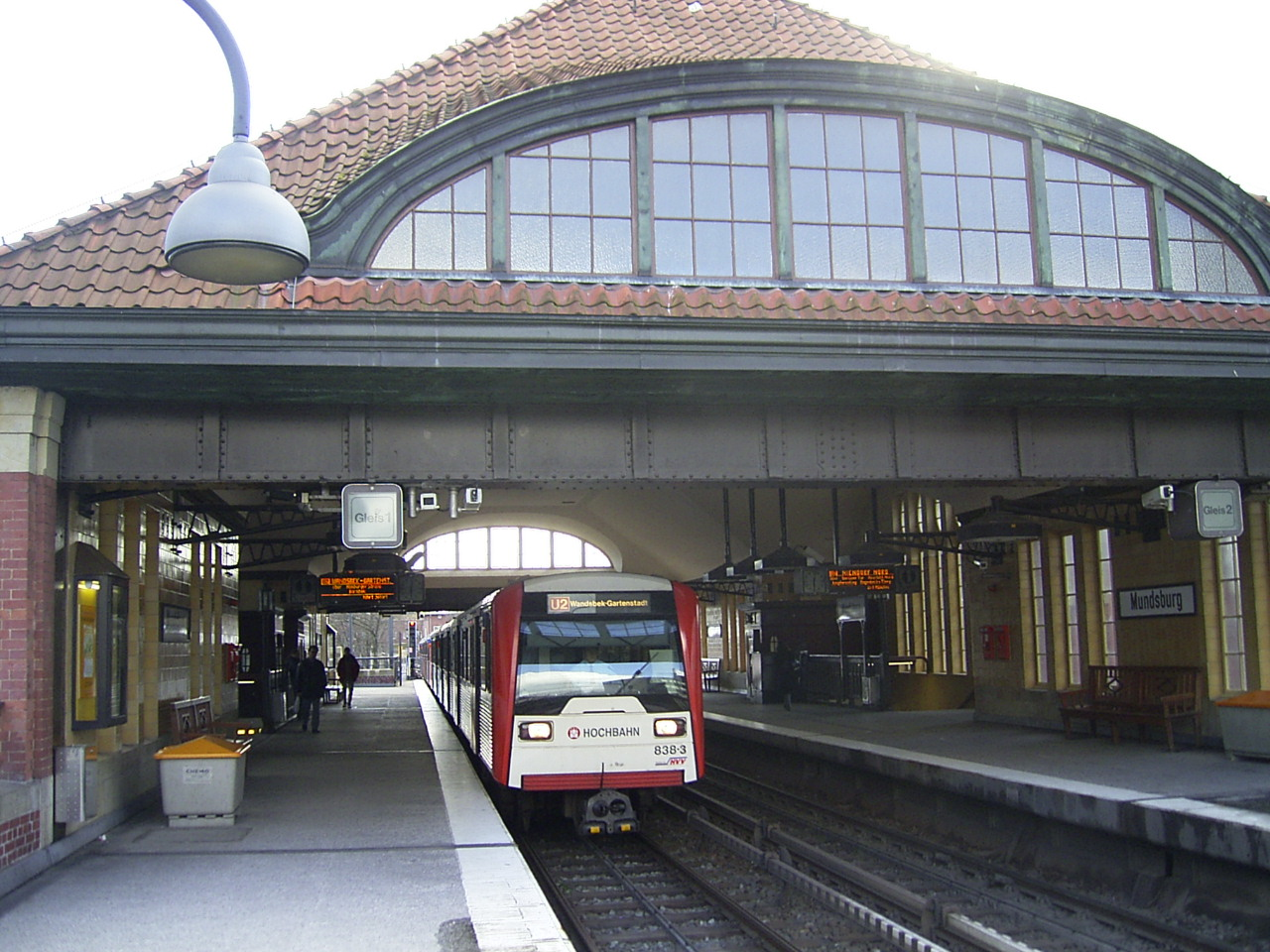

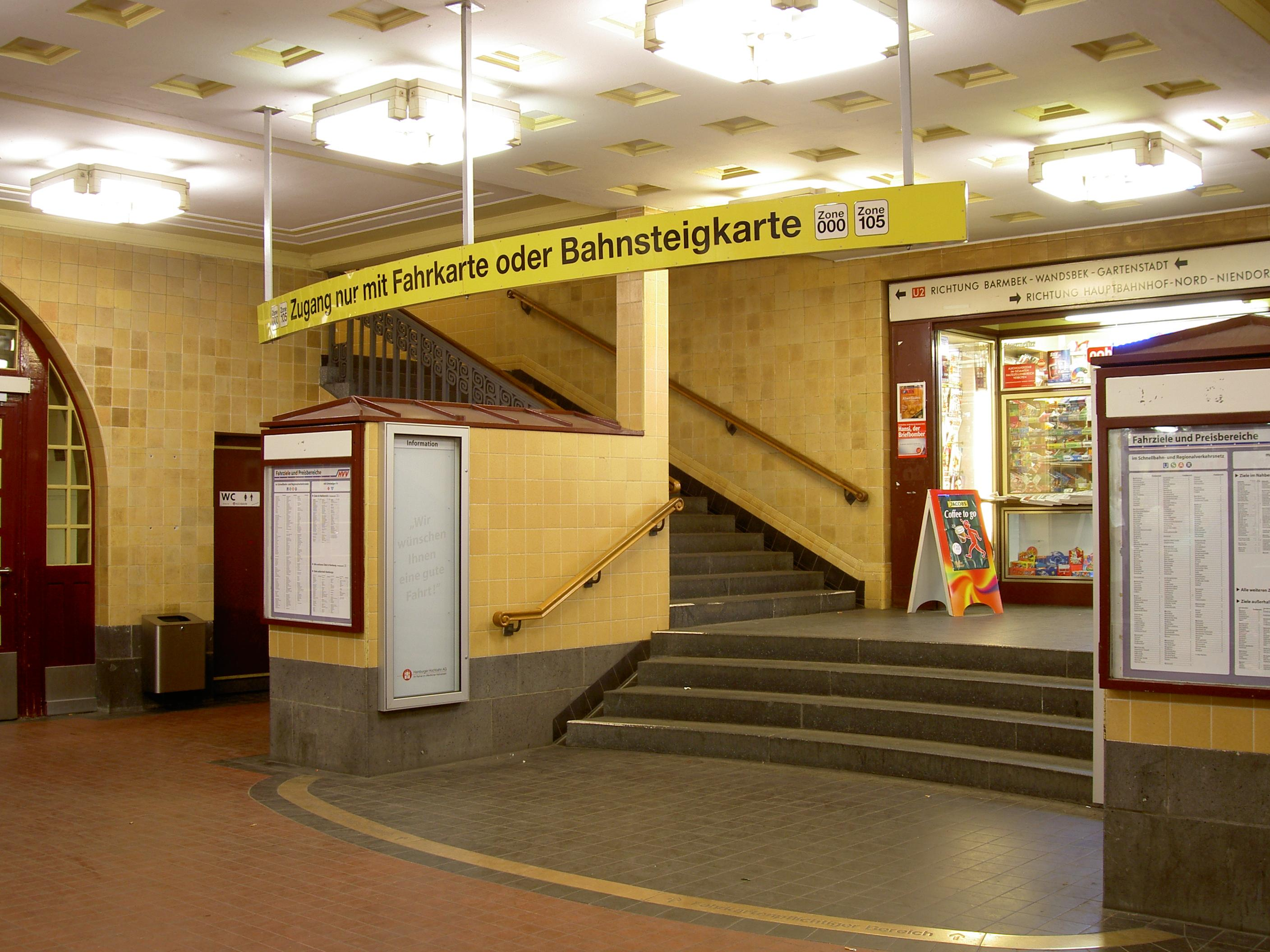

== See also ==
- List of Hamburg U-Bahn stations
