= Diebsteich station =

Railway station in Hamburg, Germany

Coordinates: 53°34′7″N 9°56′2″E

Diebsteich
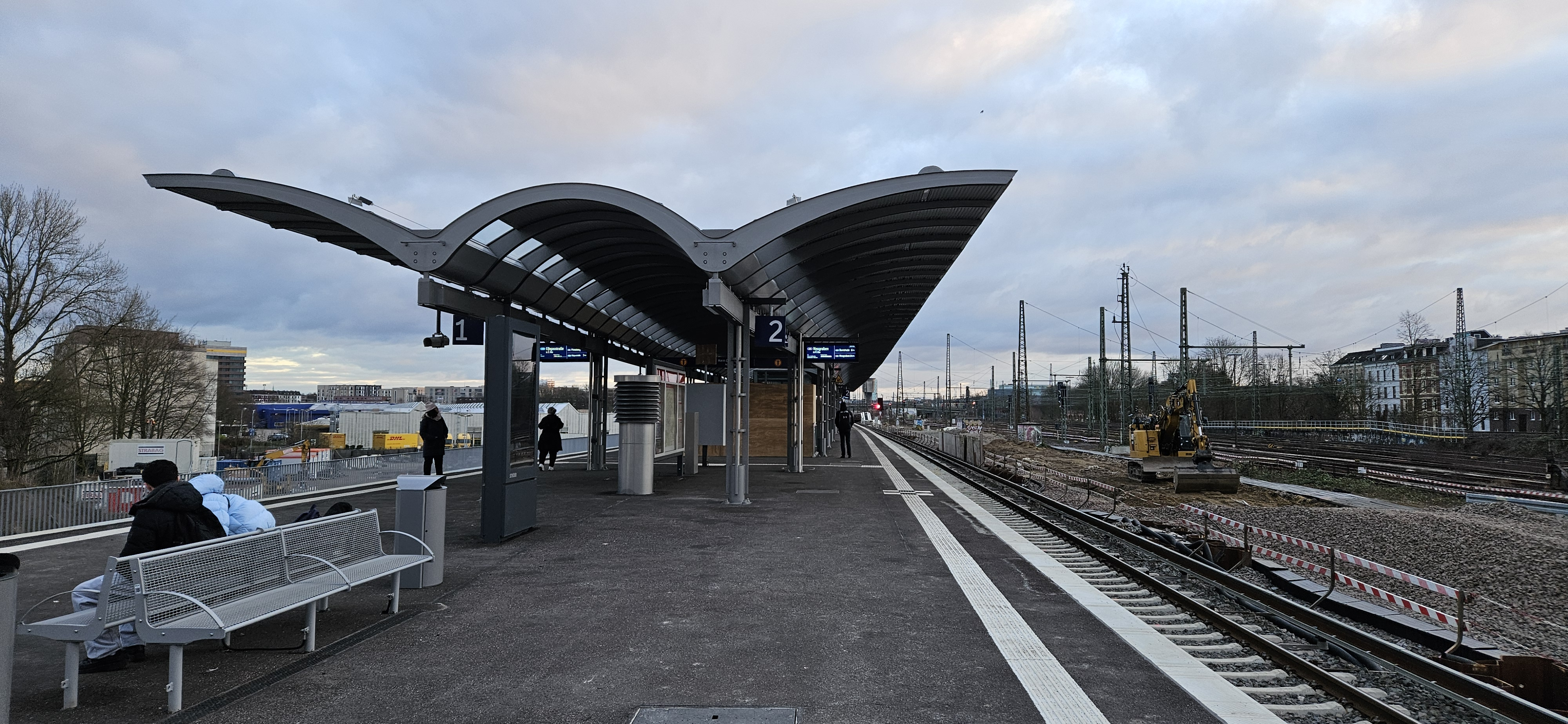
- Diebsteich railway station (after renovations)

General information
- Location: Plönerstr. 22766 Hamburg; Germany
- Line: RE70 IC/ICE
- Platforms: 2 (island platform) + 8 (express train platforms, planned)
- Tracks: 2+8
- Connections: Bus

Construction
- Structure type: Elevated
- Platform levels: 2 (S-Bahn + RE and long distance trains (ICE))
- Parking: No
- Cycle facilities: Rented boxes and bicycle stands

Other information
- Station code: ds100: ADT; DB station code: 1193; Type: Bf; Category: 4
- Fare zone: HVV: A/101

History
- Opened: 26 September 1962; 63 years ago
- Closed: Closed for reconstruction until 7 February 2025
- Rebuilt: 2022-2025 (S-Bahn), 2022-2027 (Long distance and regional trains)
- Electrified: at opening, 1200 V DC system 3rd rail

Services
Preceding station	Hamburg S-Bahn	Following station
Langenfelde towards Pinneberg	S3	Hamburg-Altona towards Hamburg-Neugraben
Langenfelde towards Elbgaustraße	S5	Holstenstraße towards Stade
Location
- Location within Hamburg Location within Germany

The train station Diebsteich is served by the rapid transit trains of the Hamburg S-Bahn and the Hamburg-Altona–Kiel railway.

It is planned to replace Hamburg-Altona station for long distance and regional trains in 2027.

Right along the tracks is the border of the quarter Altona-Nord and Bahrenfeld of the Altona borough in Hamburg, Germany.

The station is named after a pond Diebsteich in the neighbourhood which no longer exists.

== Future ==
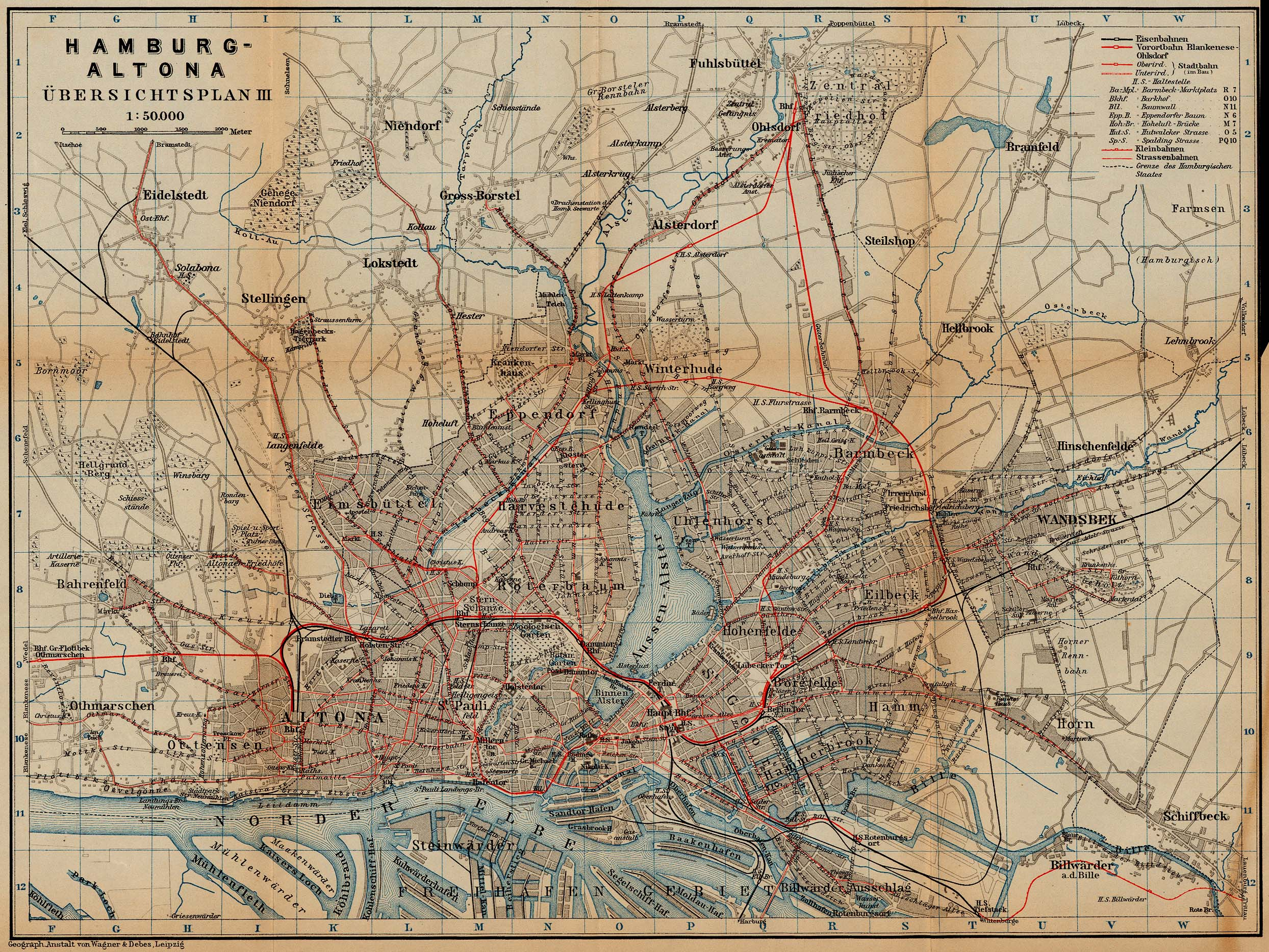
Map of railway lines in Hamburg (ca. 1910) (with the lake Diebsteich, the train station not yet built)

According to the German newspapers Hamburger Morgenpost and Die Welt in September 2009, the Deutsche Bahn AG plans to close the long distance train station at Altona and to build a new station at the area of Diebsteich station.

The station will be rebuilt and renamed Hamburg Altona, replacing the current Hamburg Altona station, which will be withdrawn from long distance and regional service after completion of the works, allowing terminating trains to proceed to the stabling facilities in Langenfelde without turning around, as well as services travelling onward to Kiel to serve the station without turning around.

== Station layout ==
The station is elevated with an island platform, two tracks and only one exit. The station is in the fare zone 101.

== Station services ==
The rapid transit trains of the lines S3 and S5 of the Hamburg S-Bahn stop at the station.

On track 1 the train destinations are Pinneberg (S3) and Elbgaustraße station (S5). On track 2 the destination of S5 is via Holstenstraße toward Stade. The S5 takes 10 minutes to reach Hamburg central station. The trains of the line S3 continue via Hamburg-Altona and Jungfernstieg railway station toward Neugraben and reach Hamburg central station in 18 minutes.

=== Facilities at the station ===
A small shop in the station sells fast food and newspapers. There are no lockerboxes and the station is not fully accessible for handicapped persons, because there is no lift. No personnel are attending the station, but there are SOS and information telephones and ticket machines. Bicycles can be locked in a previous rented boxes and also locked at stands free of charge.

== See also ==
- Hamburger Verkehrsverbund HVV
