= Barmbek-Süd =

- Quarter of Hamburg
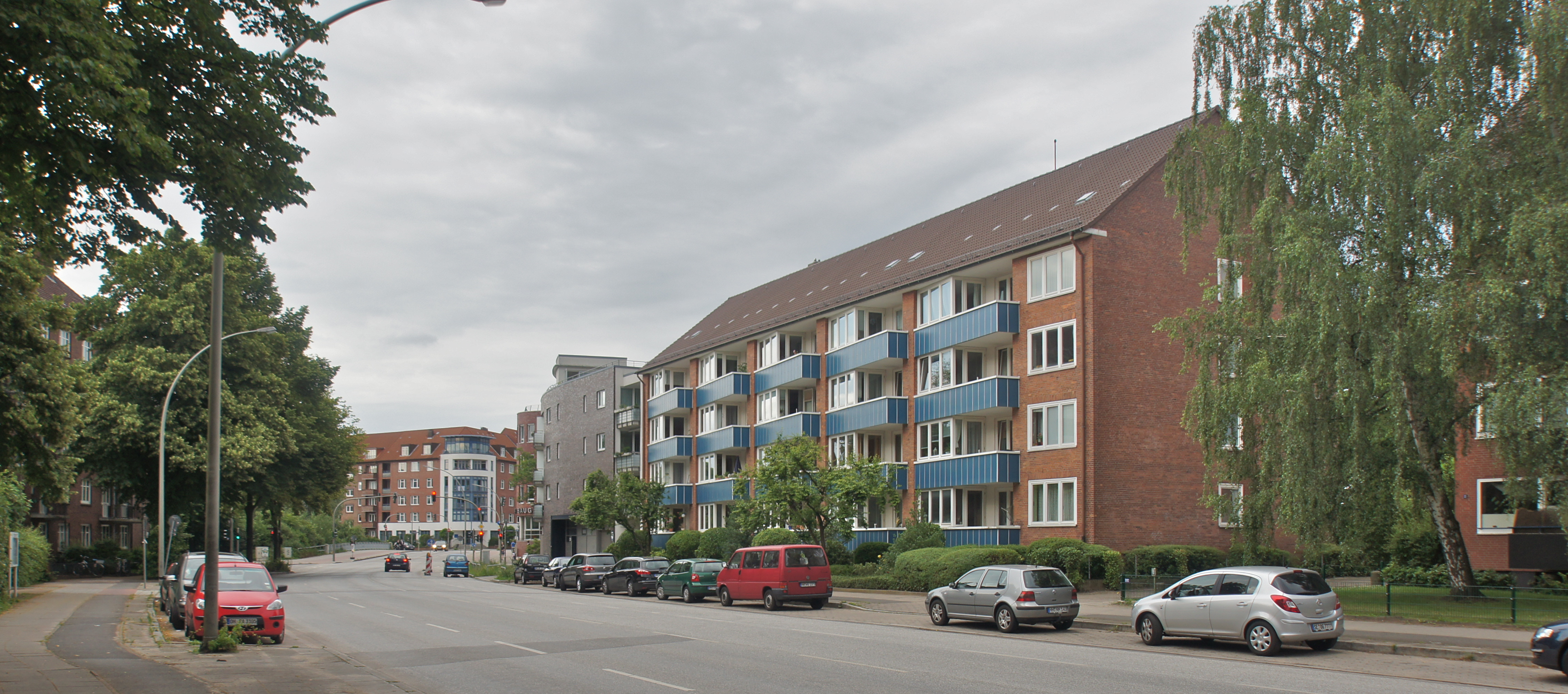
- Typical apartment buildings at the street of Reesestrasse

- Location of Barmbek-Süd in Hamburg
- Interactive map of Barmbek-Süd
- Location within Germany Location within Hamburg
- Coordinates: 53.5801°N 10.0407°E
- Country: Germany
- State: Hamburg
- City: Hamburg
- Borough: Hamburg-Nord

Area
  - Total: 3.1 km^{2} (1.2 sq mi)

Population (2024-12-31)
  - Total: 37,091
  - Density: 12,000/km^{2} (31,000/sq mi)
- Time zone: UTC+01:00 (CET)
  - Summer (DST): UTC+02:00 (CEST)
- Dialling codes: 040
- Vehicle registration: HH

Barmbek-Süd (German pronunciation: [ˈbaʁmbeːk ˈzyːt], lit. 'Barmbek-South') is a quarter of Hamburg, Germany, in the borough of Hamburg-Nord. It is located in the east of Hamburg-Nord, approximately five kilometers from Hamburg city center. Barmbek-Süd is a densely built-up area.

Barmbek-Süd borders the quarters of Barmbek-Nord, Dulsberg, Eilbek, Uhlenhorst, and Winterhude.

== Geography ==
It borders the quarters Barmbek-Nord, Dulsberg, Eilbek, Winterhude and Uhlenhorst.

== History ==
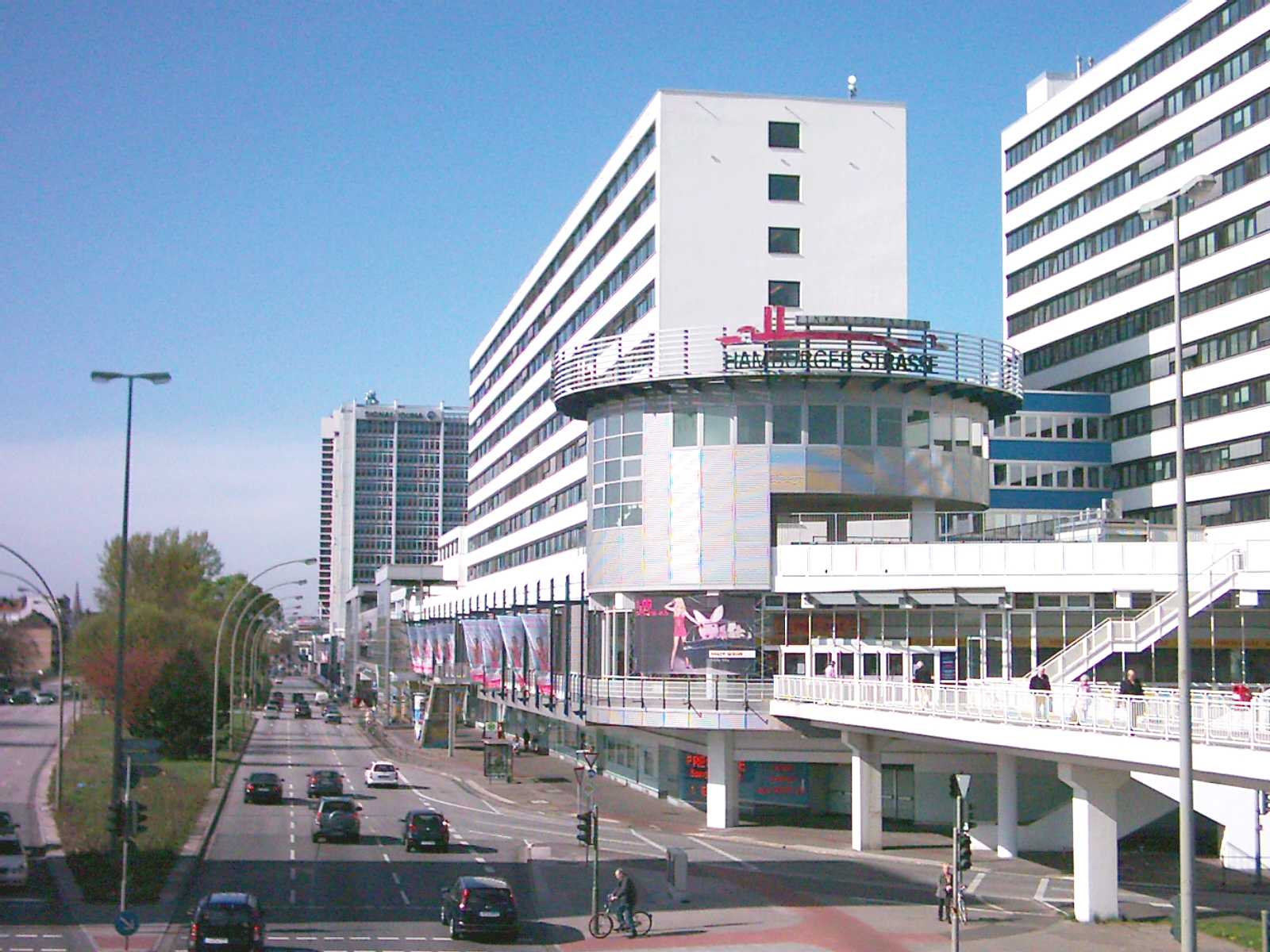
The shopping mall of Einkaufszentrum Hamburger Straße in 2007

Settlement in the area began, as a large workers quarter had to be demolished prior to the construction of the Speicherstadt in 1883. The village of Barmbeck itself had been under Hamburg administration since 1830, and it became a suburb of Hamburg in 1894. In the same year also Eilbek, before that the southernmost part of the village of Barmbeck, became a quarter of Hamburg. Barmbek-Süd was as a workers quarter mainly populated during the 1910s and 1920s during the process of industrialization, but also had industrial structures itself.

In 1867 a first horse track was established along the street of Hamburger Straße, in 1890 a depot of it opened at Mesterkamp (today a bus depot). In 1907, the Hamburg-Altonaer Stadt- und Vorortbahn (Hamburg - Altona urban and suburban railway, now incorporated into Hamburg S-Bahn) with the Barmbeck station, now Barmbek station located in Barmbek-Nord, started operation. In 1912, the Hamburger Hochbahn started operating the first part of the Hamburg U-Bahn circle line from Barmbek station to the central station. With the stations of Dehnhaide, Hamburger Straße and Mundsburg the area was connected to the inner city of Hamburg. The center of Barmbek-Süd was located north of Mundsburg station.

Barmbek-Süd had faced major destruction during the Bombing of Hamburg in World War II. It was mainly rebuilt in the 1950s, including parks and apartment buildings with the typical brick architecture. In 1970 the major mall of Einkaufszentrum Hamburger Straße (today Shopping-Center Hamburger Meile) opened, then considered as the largest mall within a city in Germany. In the 1990s the office area of Alster-City was built on the site of the former gasworks.

== Politics ==
These are the results of Barmbek-Süd in the Hamburg state election:

Election	SPD	Greens	Left	CDU	FDP	AfD	Others
2020	34,9 %	31,4 %	10,7 %	7,1 %	4,1 %	4,1 %	7,7 %
2015	47,2 %	15,9 %	11,0 %	10,5 %	5,2 %	5,0 %	5,2 %
2011	51,1 %	14,8 %	7,0 %	15,6 %	4,6 %	–	6,9 %
2008	38,2 %	11,5 %	7,0 %	37,0 %	3,9 %	–	2,3 %
2004	34,2 %	15,2 %	–	41,1 %	2,5 %	–	7,0 %
2001	42,8 %	10,0 %	0,5 %	22,4 %	4,2 %	–	20,1 %
1997	42,3 %	16,0 %	0,7 %	24,3 %	2,4 %	–	14,3 %
1993	48,4 %	14,4 %	–	19,1 %	2,8 %	–	15,3 %
