= Altona-Nord =

- Quarter of Hamburg
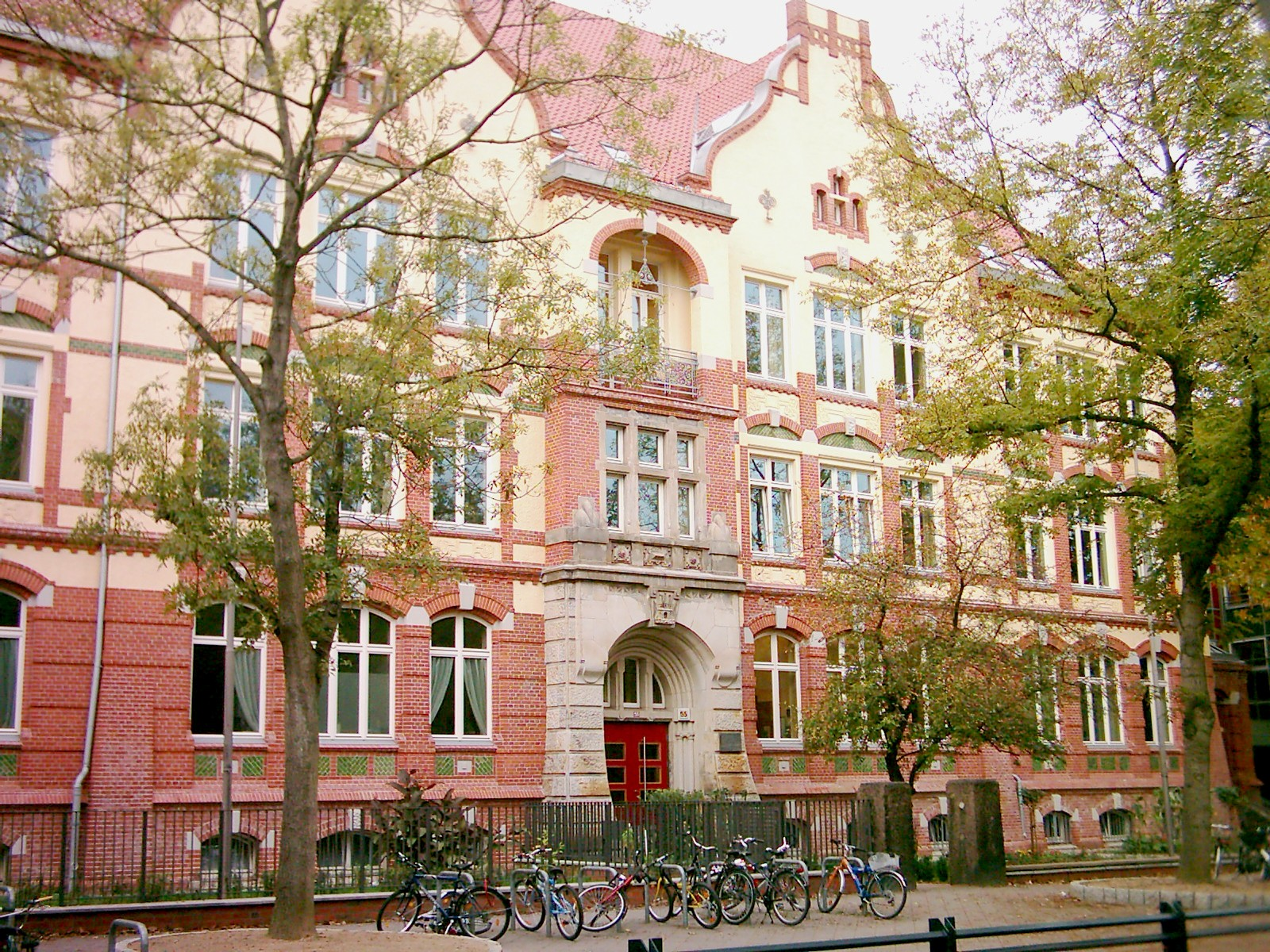
- The school Theodor-Haubach-Schule

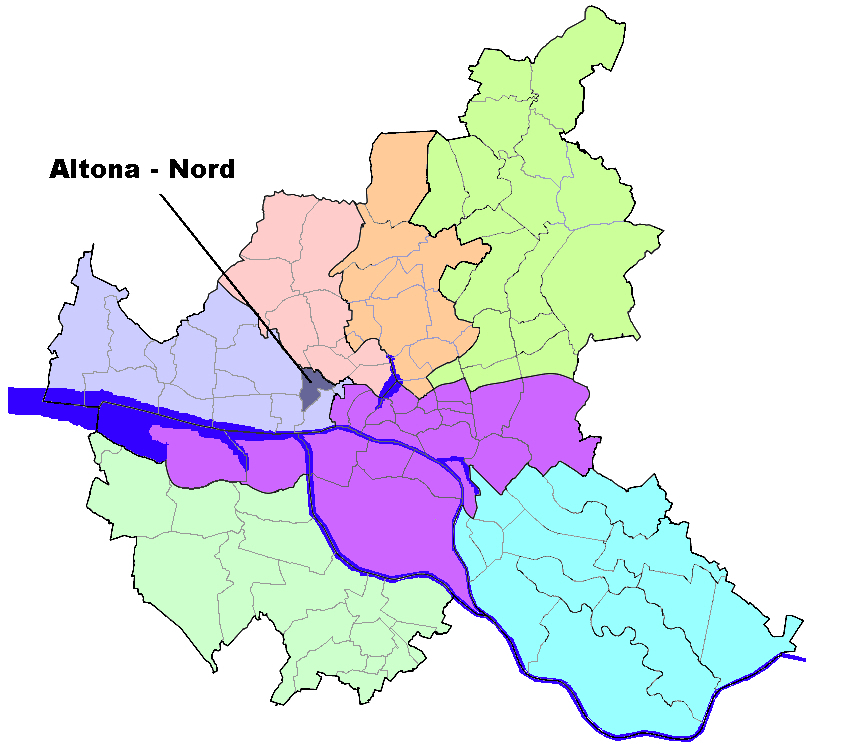
- Location of Altona-Nord in Hamburg
- Interactive map of Altona-Nord
- Location within Germany Location within Hamburg
- Coordinates: 53°33′47″N 9°56′43″E
- Country: Germany
- State: Hamburg
- City: Hamburg
- Borough: Altona

Area
  - Total: 2.2 km^{2} (0.85 sq mi)

Population (2024-12-31)
  - Total: 26,777
  - Density: 12,000/km^{2} (32,000/sq mi)
- Time zone: UTC+01:00 (CET)
  - Summer (DST): UTC+02:00 (CEST)
- Dialling codes: 040
- Vehicle registration: HH

Altona-Nord (German pronunciation: [ˈaltoːnə ˈnɔʁt], lit. 'Altona-North') located in the Altona borough in the city Hamburg, Germany, is one of 104 quarters of Hamburg. In 2023, the population was 26,807.

== Geography ==
According to the statistical office of Hamburg and Schleswig-Holstein, the quarter has a total area of 2.2 square kilometres (1 sq mi).

== Demographics ==
In 2006, in the quarter Altona-Nord were living 21,406 people. 15,1% were children under the age of 18, and 9,8% were 65 years of age or older. 22,9% were immigrants. 1689 people were registered as unemployed. In 1999, 55,1% of all households were made up of individuals.

Population by year

1987	1988	1989	1990	1991	1992	1993	1994	1995	1996	1997	1998	1999
19,424	19,633	19,853	20,113	20,288	20,297	20,542	20,635	20,586	20,562	20,497	20,433	20,725

2000	2001	2002	2003	2004	2005	2006	2014	2016
20,701	20,949	21,030	21,125	21,246	21,158	21,406	21,766	22,137

In 2006, there were 3,314 criminal offences (155 crimes per 1,000 people).

== Politics ==
These are the results of Altona-Nord in the Hamburg state election:

Year	Greens	SPD	Left	CDU	FDP	AfD	Others
2020	37,9 %	25,5 %	22,2 %	3,1 %	2,0 %	1,7 %	7,6 %
2015	25,8 %	35,8 %	22,9 %	4,3 %	2,7 %	2,1 %	6,4 %
2011	21,5 %	46,2 %	15,8 %	6,2 %	2,3 %	–	7,9 %
2008	20,7 %	43,0 %	13,4 %	17,8 %	2,8 %	–	2,3 %
2004	31,1 %	35,3 %	–	22,8 %	1,6 %	–	9,2 %

== Education ==
In 2006, there were two elementary schools and four secondary schools in Altona-Nord.

== Economy ==
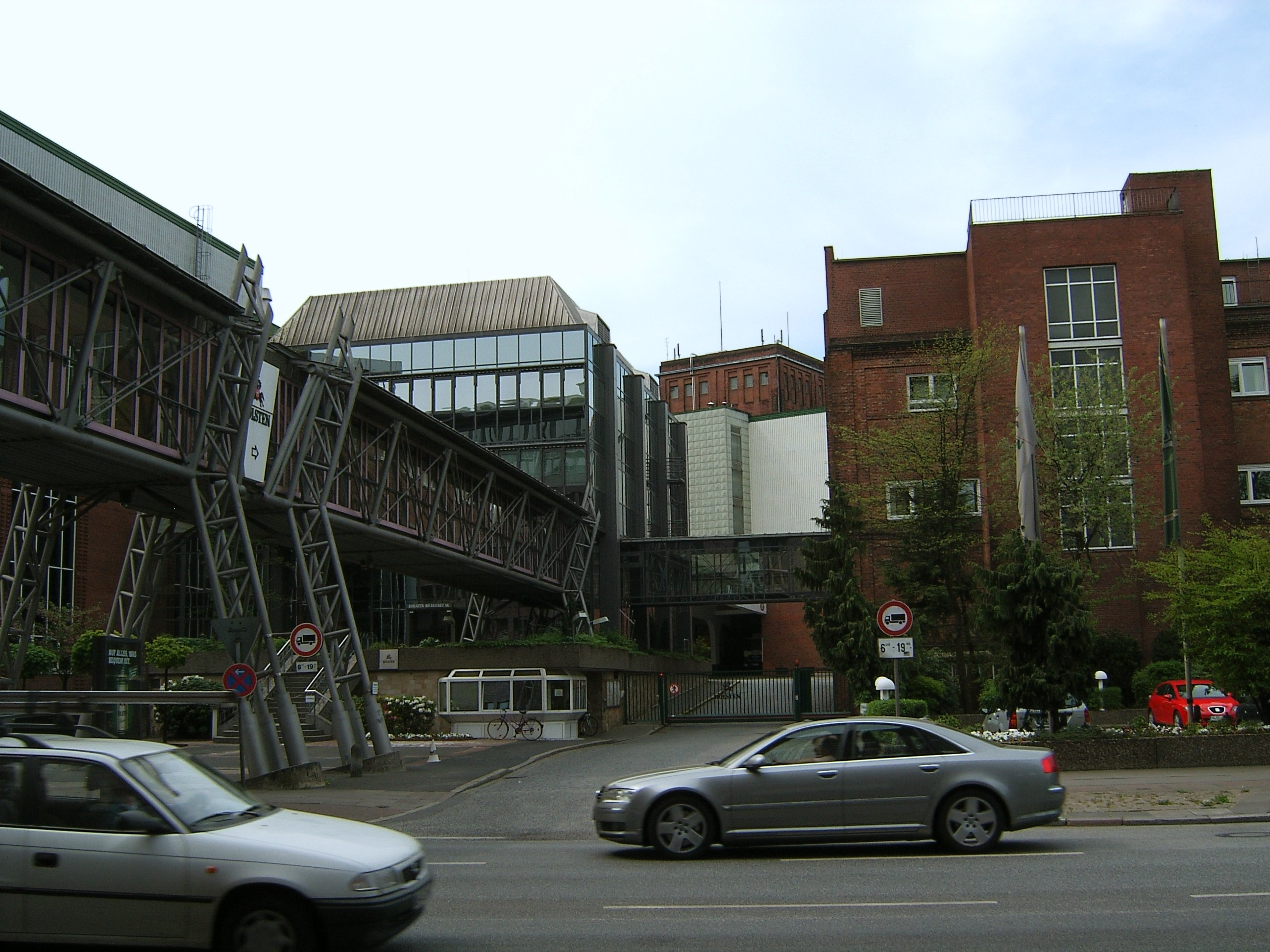
Entrance of the Holsten Brewery

Holsten Brewery plc. is located in the quarter.

== Culture ==
Altona Nord is most famous in Hamburg for its musical theatre Neue Flora, which started by showing The Phantom of the Opera.

== Infrastructure ==
=== Health systems ===
23 physicians in private practice and four pharmacies were registered in 2006.

=== Transportation ===
Altona-Nord is serviced by the rapid transit system of the city train with the stations Holstenstraße and Diebsteich.

According to the Department of Motor Vehicles (Kraftfahrt-Bundesamt), 5,682 private cars were registered in Altona-Nord (269 cars/1,000 people).
