= Klein Flottbek =

Coordinates: 53.5522°N 9.8644°E

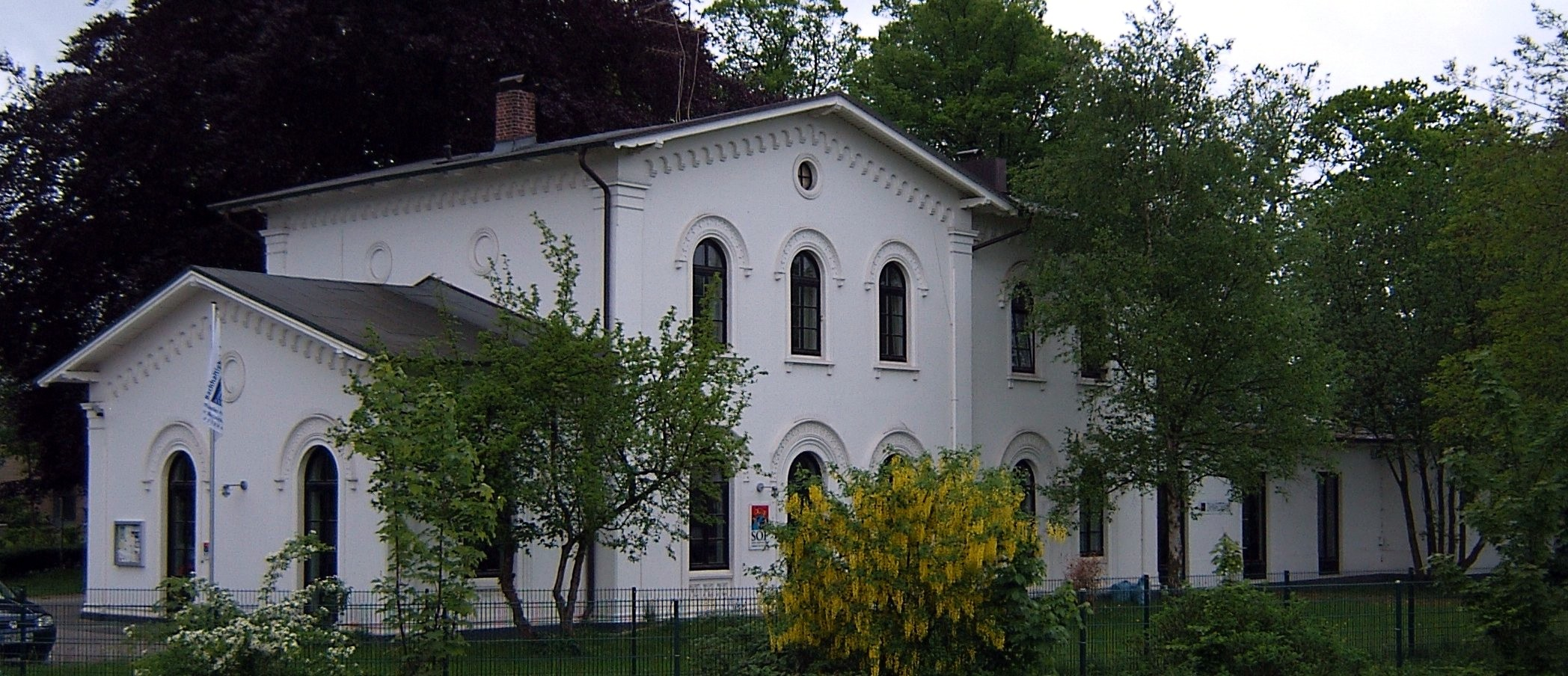
Klein Flottbek station, a listed building, in 2006

Klein Flottbek (German pronunciation: [ˈklaɪn ˈflɔtbeːk], lit. 'Little Flottbek', in contrast to "Great Flottbek") is a sub-urban district and neighbourhood in the quarters of Nienstedten, Othmarschen and Osdorf, located in the Altona borough of Hamburg, Germany. Unlike neighbouring Groß Flottbek, the former municipality of Klein Flottbek is not an official quarter of Hamburg today.

== Geography ==
Today, the western part of Klein Flottbek belongs to Nienstedten, the eastern part to Othmarschen. The area north of the S-Bahn tracks, including the Loki-Schmidt-Garten, Hamburg's botanical garden, belongs to Osdorf. To the south, the Jenisch park is located with the museums of Jenisch House and Ernst Barlach House. Flottbek stream flows through Klein Flottbek and into Elbe River near Teufelsbrück.

== History ==
Originally, Klein Flottbek municipality belonged to the Pinneberg district in Holstein. Along with Altona, of which it was a part since 1927, the former municipality of Klein Flottbek became a part of Hamburg in 1937/1938 through the Greater Hamburg Act.

== Transportation ==
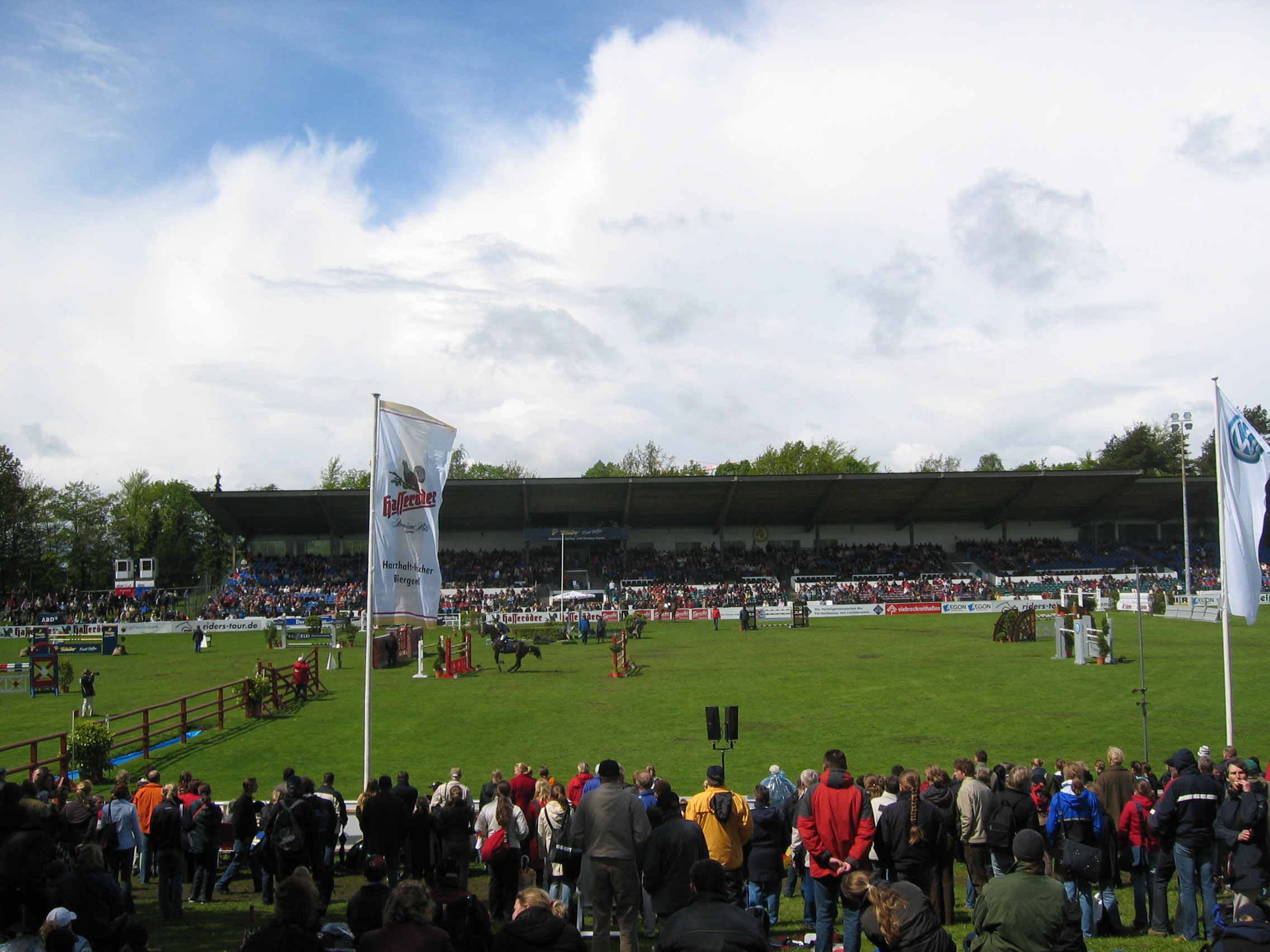
Deutsches Spring- und Dressurderby at Derby-Park Klein Flottbek

Klein Flottbek station is served by the Hamburg S-Bahn lines S1 and S11. Several bus lines service the area, including metro bus lines 115 and 21 at Klein Flottbek station.

== Horse riding ==
Klein Flottbek is known for horse-riding in the Derby-Park Klein Flottbek south of the S-Bahn station, where the German Jumping and Dressage Derby is held annually. The compound was also used for classical concerts and fairs (Home & Garden). A further stand is currently projected.

== People ==
- Bernhard von Bülow (1849-1929), German politician and chancellor
