= List of castles in Hamburg =

This is a list of castles and manor houses in the German city-state of Hamburg. The list encompasses castles referred to in German as Burg (castle or fortification), Schloss (manor house, castle or palace), and Herrenhaus (manor house or mansion); existing, ruined or completely vanished.

The oldest known structures in Hamburg are or were early Medieval fortifications built between the 8th and 11th centuries, e.g. Hammaburg, Bischofsturm, Domburg, Alsterburg and Neue Burg. They were all purpose-built and are located in Hamburg's Altstadt (old town). Remains of the Bischofsturm (Bishop's tower) can be visited in close vicinity of St. Petrikirche.

Later buildings were rarely fortifications. From the 13th century onwards, Hamburg had a complete ring of defensive structures, and as one of Europe's oldest city-republics there were no royal or princely estates (notable exceptions are structures in the boroughs of Bergedorf and Harburg which date from a time prior to becoming part of Hamburg). In the 17th through 19th century wealthy grand burghers had their country estates built as mansions or manor houses in the former outskirts, notably along Elbe and Elbchaussee in Othmarschen, Nienstedten and Blankenese, but also along Alster and the Alster Valley.

Name	German name	Date^{[A]}	Location^{[B]}	Condition	Image	Notes
Bergedorf Castle	Schloss Bergedorf	13th century	Bergedorf	Museum	Bergedorf Castle	
Hammaburg	Hammaburg	8.century-1020	Domplatz	No remains	Domplatz Hamburg with archaeological excavations	The name giving castle for the city of Hamburg
The New Castle	Neue Burg	built from: 1021-1023 In use: 1023-1139	Hopfenmarkt	No remains		The New Castle is the successor of the Hammaburg
Harburg Castle	Harburger Schloss/Horeburg	early 11th century	Harburg	Tenement/Museum in spe	Harburg Castle in the 1890s	
Jenisch House	Jenisch Haus	1831 – 1834	Othmarschen	Museum	Jenisch-Haus	
Neuwerk lighthouse	Leuchtturm Neuwerk	1300 –1310	Neuwerk	Hotel and lighthouse	Neuwerk lighthouse in	Fortification, build from 1300 to 1310. Since 1815, lighthouse.
Stillhorn Castle	Schloss Stillhorn	16th century	Wilhelmsburg	No remains		
Wandsbek Castle	Wandsbeker Schloss	1772 – 1778	Wandsbek	Ruins not accessible		Demolished in 1861
Wellingsbüttel Manor	Herrenhaus Wellingsbüttel	1750	Wellingsbüttel	Private nursing home and restaurant	Mansion Wellingsbüttel in 2006	

1. Construction date or first mentioned on record.
2. Borough or quarter of current political location.

== Bibliography ==
- Rainer-Maria Weiss, Anne Klammt (eds.): Mythos Hammaburg. Archäologische Entdeckungen zu den Anfängen Hamburgs. Hamburg 2014, ISBN 978-3-931429-27-0
- Rainer-Maria Weiss (ed.).Burgen in Hamburg: Eine Spurensuche Wachholz, Kiel 2021, ISBN 978-3-529-05070-1
- Thorsten Lemm: Die frühmittelalterlichen Ringwälle im westlichen und mittleren Holstein. Wachholtz Verlag, Neumünster/Hamburg 2013, ISBN 978-3-529-01806-0

== See also ==
- List of castles in Germany
- List of churches in Hamburg
