= Teufelsbrück =

Area around the River Elbe in Hamburg, Germany

Coordinates: 53.5475°N 9.8639°E

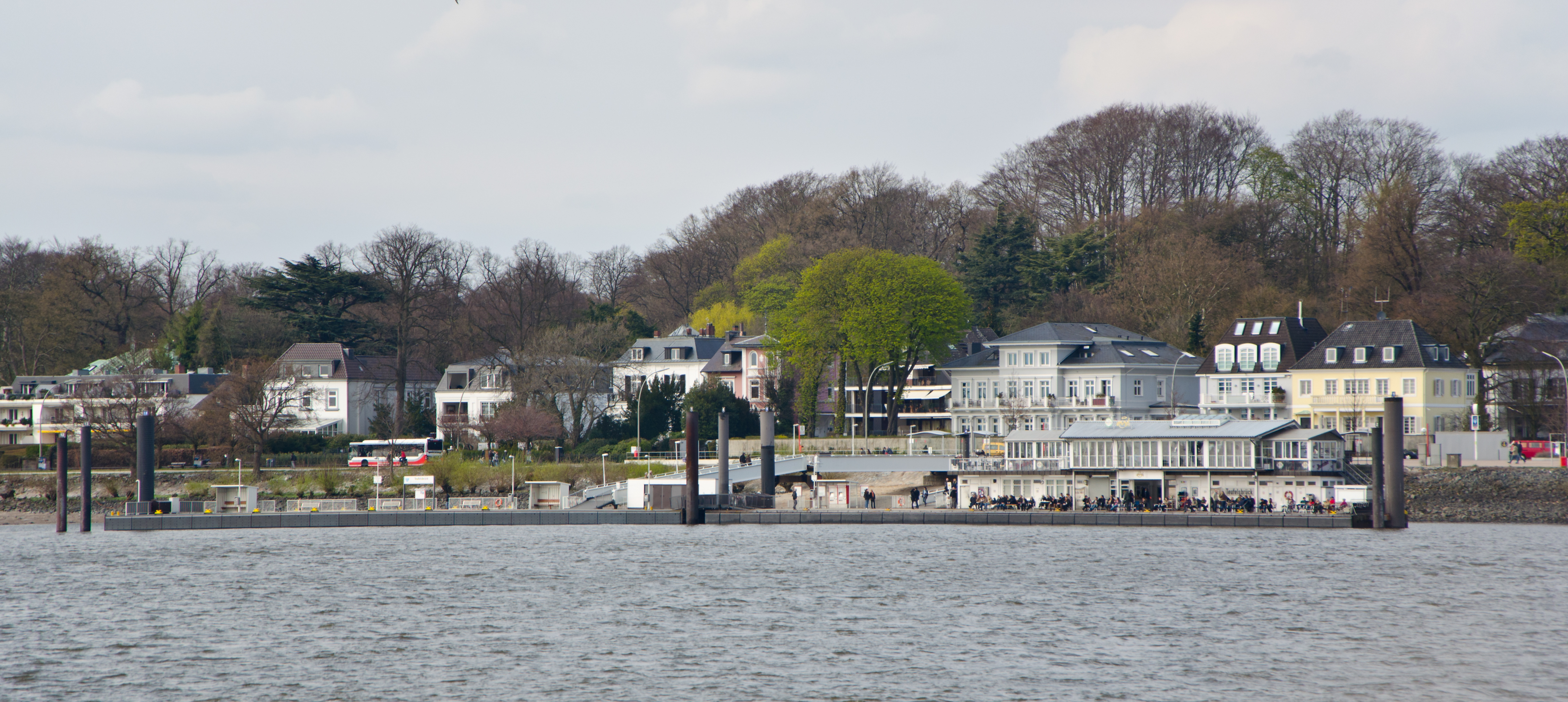
Teufelsbrück ferry pier and marina

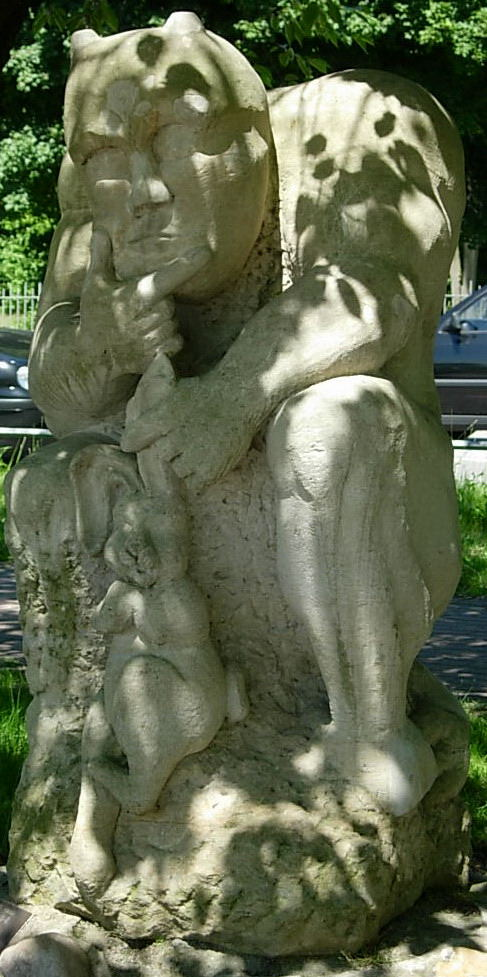
Statue of the devil near Teufelsbrück

Teufelsbrück (Devil's Bridge) is the name of the area around the mouth of Flottbek stream into the River Elbe in Hamburg, Germany. It is located in the local subdistrict of Klein Flottbek and today belongs partly to the quarters of Othmarschen and Nienstedten. Initially, Teufelsbrück was the name of the bridge of the street of Elbchaussee over the Flottbek stream; later it was used for the area itself, including the nearby ferry pier and marina. The area lies south of the Jenisch park.

== Name ==
The name goes back to an old legend. At the ford of the Flottbek stream, wagons frequently had accidents caused by broken wheels, so the inhabitants blamed the devil for it. A carpenter was assigned to build a bridge. But he made a pact with the devil and promised him the soul of the first creature crossing the bridge. On the day of inauguration, after a priest had blessed the bridge and the devil was looking forward for a human victim, the county councillor and the priest had a debate who should cross the bridge first. Meanwhile, a rabbit accidentally crossed it and the disappointed devil disappeared into the river.

This legend exists in similar form also for other bridges in Germany (see de:Brickegickel), as well as for the Teufelsbrücke in Schöllenen Gorge, Switzerland.

A statue made of stone refers to the legend at Teufelsbrück. Earlier statues at this place were made of wood, but were stolen several times.
