= Elbchaussee =

Famous Hamburg thoroughfare with stately homes

The Elbchaussee (German pronunciation: [ˈɛlpʃɔˌseː]) is a famous thoroughfare of Hamburg, Germany, joining the city's western Elbe suburbs (Elbvororte) Othmarschen, Nienstedten and Blankenese with Altona and Hamburg's inner city. Running along the elevated northern Elbe shore, across Geest heights, embedded forests and meadows, the Elbchaussee offers scenic views across the widening Lower Elbe, onto the opposite plains of Altes Land, and the distant activities of the port's container terminals.

Elbchaussee is best known for its many stately homes and villas, framed by ancient trees and lush parks and gardens. Developed as a residential road in the 18th century, at times also center of a local recreational area, Elbchaussee today is still home to many of Hamburg's finest residences, restaurants and hotels. At a length of 8.6 kilometers (5.3 miles) and a traffic volume of 40,000 cars per day, it also covers functions as a local collector road and one of Hamburg's arterial roads.

== History ==
Since the time after the Thirty Years' War (1618–1648), the area had a few country estates and summer retreats connected by a bumpy country lane. During the second half of the 18th century, with more Hamburg grand burghers, wealthy merchants and ship-owners establishing their homes along the Elbe shore, Elbchaussee became a fashionable residential address. Around 1780, and on private initiative, the street was enhanced as a chaussée and managed as an exclusive toll road.

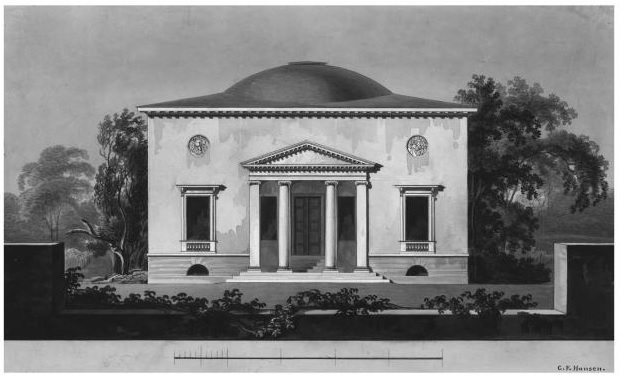
Baur's Landhaus (1806) by C. F. Hansen at Elbchaussee 372, Nienstedten

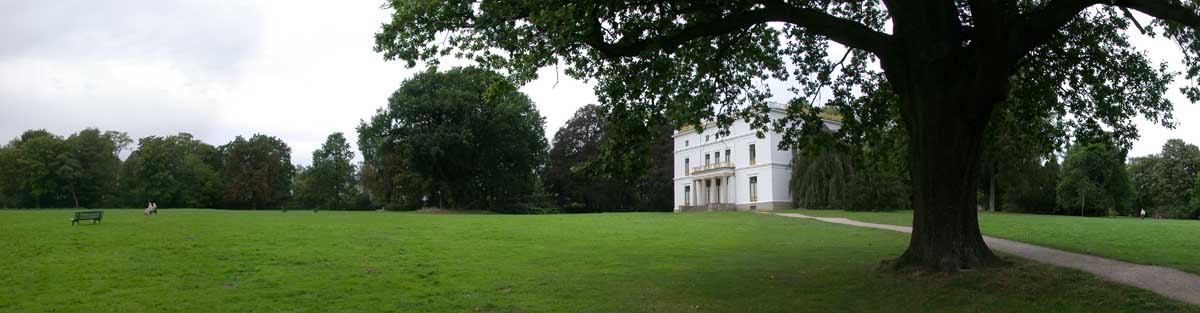
Jenisch Haus and Park (1834) by G. F. Forsmann, Othmarschen

The years between 1790 and 1840 saw a building boom on Elbchaussee. Villas and country houses from those years are identifiable by being named after the respective commissioning Hanseatic first families, and many of them likened to Royal residences. Typical for late 18th-century and early 19th-century European architecture, most of them were built in Neoclassical or Biedermeier style, surrounded by parks often inspired by English landscape design. During the Gründerzeit years (ca. 1871–1900), other building styles were also applied, including various Revival styles, Art Deco and Art Nouveau (Jugendstil).

With completion of modern infrastructure projects in the second half of the 19th century, the Elbchausee became popular as a local recreational area. On weekends and bank holidays, the new railway, tram and ferry lines brought large crowds to the Elbchaussee and its beaches. In the 1890s the management of the promenade was transferred to municipal authorities.

The Elbe suburbs were merged into the town of Altona in 1927, which in turn was merged into the city of Hamburg in 1937. As recent as 1950, a renaming of the eastern half was carried out. Despite forming a unity in terms of both traffic and a landscaped urban space all along, the street's eastern half was until then called "Flottbecker Chaussee" or "Flottbeker Chaussee", only the western half "Elbchaussee". (Note: in older spelling also Elb-Chaussee; Elbchaussee is a German language portmanteau consisting of the words "Elbe" and "Chaussee".) Since the 1990s a number of villas of the fin de siècle have been replaced by high end apartment buildings, mainly New Classical or Modern architecture.

== Route description ==
Map of Hamburg, indicating the two ends of Elbchaussee at Blankenese and Ottensen, and the three Elbe ferry piers along its course.
B = Blankenese Pier, T = Teufelsbrück Pier, N = Neumühlen/ Oevelgönne Pier
Elbchaussee (Germany)

Within its length of 8.6 kilometers (5.3 miles), Elbchaussee is a rather heterogeneous street.

At its eastern end, Elbchaussee starts hardly noticeable as an extension of Altona's Palmaille and Klopstockstraße. The first public park to the left is Heine-Park, laid out as an English park in the late 18th century. Subsequent parks are Donner's Park and Rosengarten. These green spaces all have interconnecting perrons and stairways down to Neumühlen at the Elbe's shore. Neumühlen has a quay wall, then from the Neumühlen/Oevelgönne Ferry Pier onwards, the Oevelgönne shore has a natural sand beach. The section of Elbchaussee up to Teufelsbrück Ferry Pier features a homogenous allocation of villas on both street sides, with the exceptions of Schröder's Elbpark and Hindenburgpark.

Teufelsbrück Ferry Pier, including a small marina, are located at the mouth of the Flottbek creek. At this point, Elbchaussee leaves the elevated plateau of the Geest, and briefly comes down close to the river shore. Opposite of Teufelsbrück, the Elbchaussee passes the Flottbek Valley, landscaped into Jenisch park, at 42 hectare by far the largest of the Elbe parks. For the next one and a half kilometers, Elbchaussee runs close to the river. At Louis C. Jacob's Hotel, it leaves the Elbe shore and turns inland. After passing the rather large Hirschpark, the Elbchaussee winds into the narrow street net of Blankenese, finding its western end in continuation of Blankeneser Hauptstraße, not far off the Süllberg or Blankenese Ferry Pier.

=== Elbe parks ===
Many of the now public Elbe parks (Elbparks) used to be massive private properties.

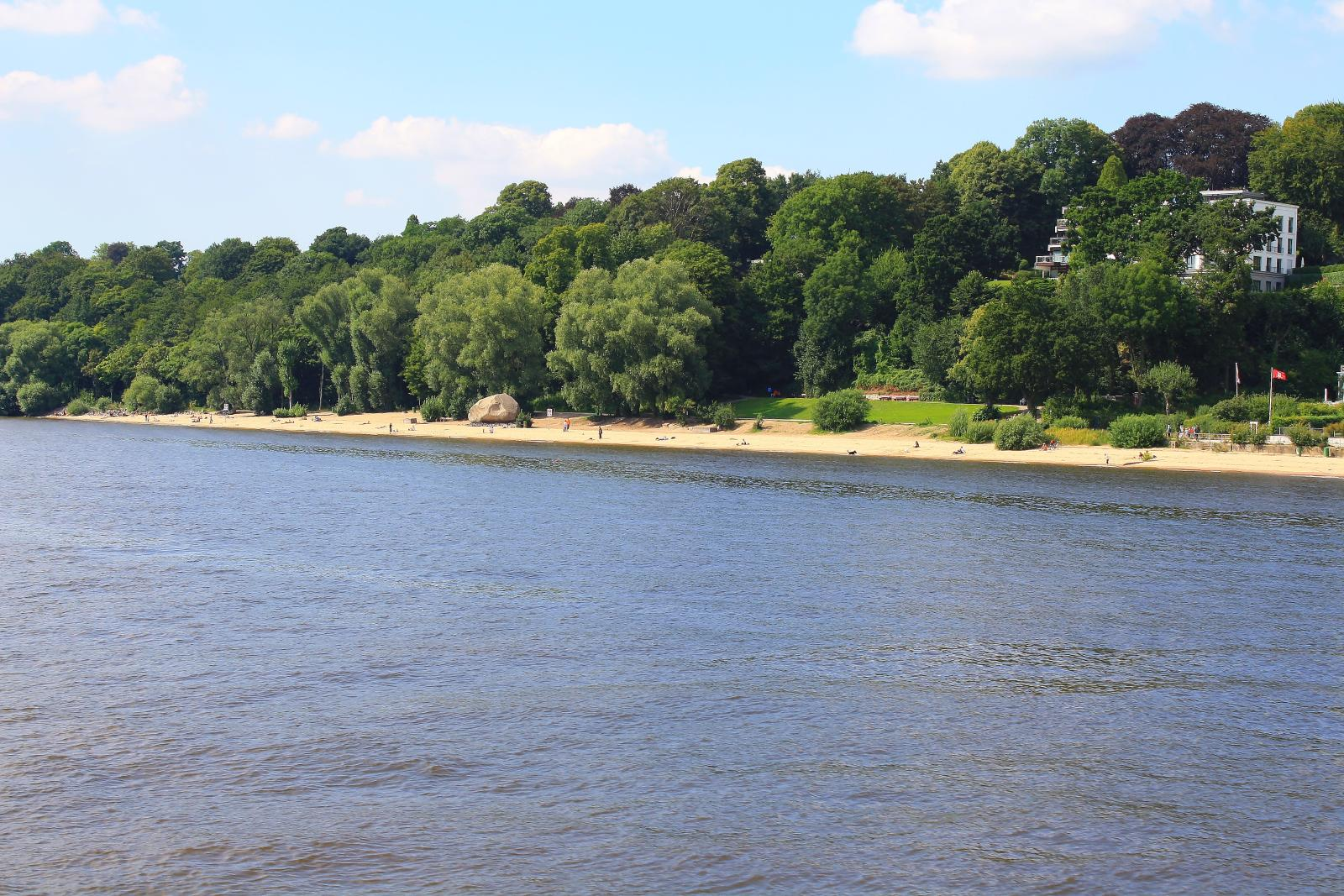
Elbe River, Oevelgönne Beach, and Schröder's Elbpark in Othmarschen. Between beach and buildings runs the Elbufer Footpath. visible center-left of the beach: "Der Alte Schwede", a 400,000 years old boulder.

| Name | Size | Location |
|---|---|---|
| Heine-Park | 3.4 ha | Elbchaussee 31–45 |
| Donner's Park | 4.3 ha | Elbchaussee |
| Rosengarten & Liebermannpark | | Elbchaussee |
| Schröder's Elbpark | | Elbchaussee |
| Hindenburgpark | | Elbchaussee |
| Jenisch-Park | 42.0 ha | Elbchaussee |
| Nienstedten Cemetery | 10.5 ha | Elbchaussee |
| Hirschpark | 24.5 ha | Elbchaussee |
| Baur's Park | 8.7 ha | Elbchaussee |

=== Notable premises ===
There are over 500 properties on Elbchaussee, approximately one fourth listed as cultural heritage monuments. The house numbering system follows a European scheme, with odd numbers for lots facing the Elbe, and even numbers for the opposite lots.

| Name | Built | Location (address) | Notes on present owner, tenant or usage |
|---|---|---|---|
| Heinrich-Heine-Haus | 1832 | Elbchaussee 31 | branch of Altona Museum |
| Villa Plange (Villa im Heine-Park) | 1913 | Elbchaussee 43 | Hamburg Business Club |
| | 1989 | Elbchaussee 139 | Gerkan, Marg and Partners |
| Villa Brandt (Säulenhaus) | 1817 | Elbchaussee 186 | Villa Brandt (Säulenhaus) |
| Halbmondhaus | 1796 | Elbchaussee 228 | |
| Villa de Freitas | 1904 | Elbchaussee 239 | Villa de Freitas |
| | 1907 | Elbchaussee 268 | Chinese Consulate General |
| Park-Hotel | 1886 | Elbchaussee 279 | Das Weisse Hotel an der Elbchaussee |
| Jenisch-Haus | 1834 | Baron-Voght-Straße 50 | branch of Altona Museum |
| Fährhaus | | Elbchaussee 322 | Restaurant "Im Fährhaus" |
| Villa Schröder | 18?? | Elbchaussee 354 | International Tribunal for the Law of the Sea (ITLOS) |
| Landhaus Baur (Elbschlösschen) | 1806 | Elbchaussee 372 | Hermann Reemtsma Stiftung |
| Nienstedten Church | 1751 | Elbchaussee | |
| | 1765 | Elbchaussee 401–403 | Lindenterrasse by Liebermann Hotel "Louis C. Jacob" (incl. the Lindenterrasse) |
| Landhaus J. C. Godeffroy | 1792 | Elbchaussee 499 | Landhaus J. C. Godeffroy branch of Hamburg Museum |
| Landhaus P. Godeffroy | 1792 | Elbchaussee 547 | |
