= Wellingsbüttel Manor =

- Herrenhaus Wellingsbüttel
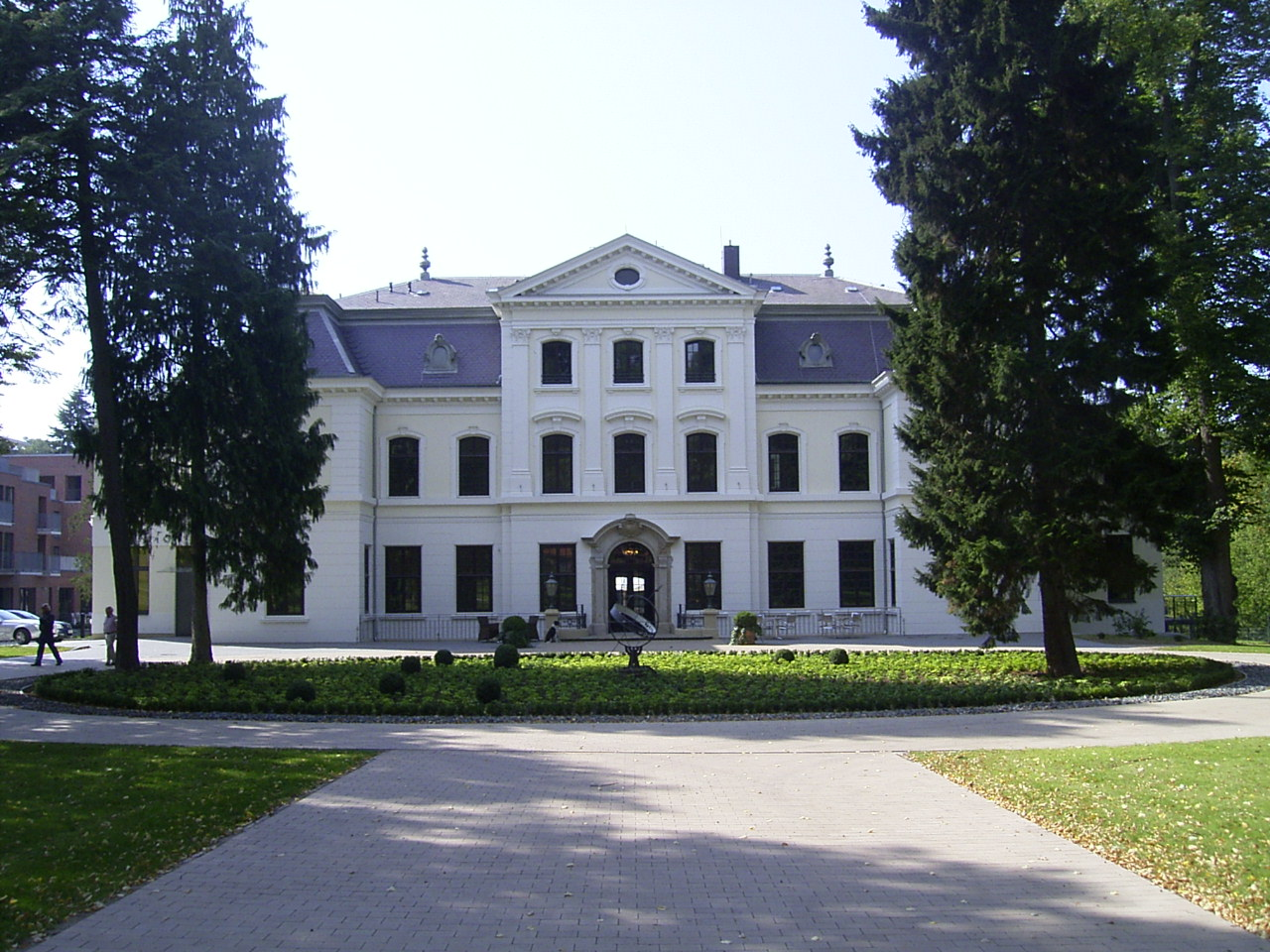
- Front elevation (2006)

- Shown within Hamburg Wellingsbüttel Manor (Germany)

General information
- Type: Manor house German: Herrenhaus
- Architectural style: Baroque
- Location: Alster valley in the borough of Wandsbek, Wellingsbütteler Weg 75; 22391 Hamburg
- Coordinates: 53°38′34″N 10°04′18″E
- Construction started: c1750
- Renovated: 1888 and 2005
- Client: Baron Maximilian Günther von Kurtzrock
- Owner: Private

Design and construction
- Architect: Georg Greggenhofer (gatehouse)

Renovating team
- Architects: Martin Haller (1888); NPS Tchoban Voss (2005)
- Other designers: Gurr · Herbst · Partner landscape architects (2002)
- Awards and prizes: Architecture Award 2008 of the Federation of German Architects (BDA)

Wellingsbüttel Manor (German: Rittergut Wellingsbüttel, since Danish times: Kanzleigut Wellingsbüttel) is a former manor with a baroque manor house (German: Herrenhaus) in Hamburg, Germany, which once enjoyed imperial immediacy (Reichsfreiheit). Wellingsbüttel was documented for the first time on 10 October 1296. Since 1937 it has formed part of the suburbs of Hamburg as the heart of the quarter of the same name, Wellingsbüttel, in the borough of Wandsbek. The owners of Wellingsbüttel Manor from the beginning of the 15th until the early 19th century were consecutively the Archbishops of Bremen, Heinrich Rantzau, Dietrich von Reinking, the Barons von Kurtzrock, Frederick VI of Denmark, Hercules Roß, the Jauch family, Cäcilie Behrens and Otto Jonathan Hübbe. In the early 19th century it was the residence and place of death of Friedrich Karl Ludwig, Duke of Schleswig-Holstein-Sonderburg-Beck, the penultimate duke, who was an ancestor inter alia of the present-day British royal family. Wellingsbüttel Manor was elevated to the status of a Danish "chancellery manor" (Kanzleigut). It was then acquired by Grand Burgher of the Free and Hanseatic City of Hamburg Johann Christian Jauch junior (1802–1880), becoming a country estate of the Jauch family. The manor house is together with Jenisch House (Jenisch-Haus) one of Hamburg's best conserved examples of the Hanseatic lifestyle in the 19th century and jointly with the manor gatehouse a listed historical monument. The estate is located on the banks of the Alster River in the middle of the Alster valley (Alstertal) nature reserve.

== History ==
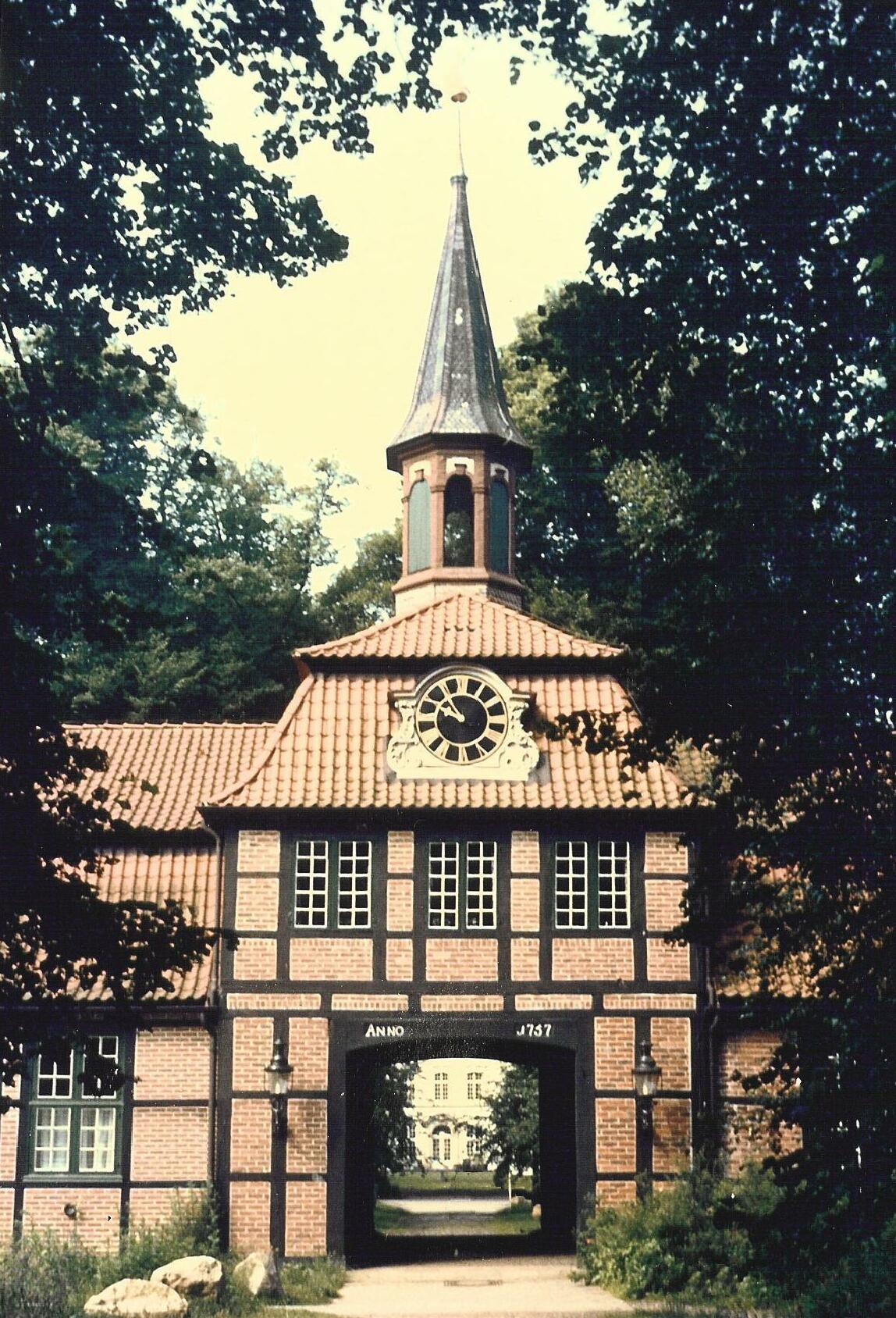
Wellingsbüttel Manor, gatehouse by Georg Greggenhofer (1757)

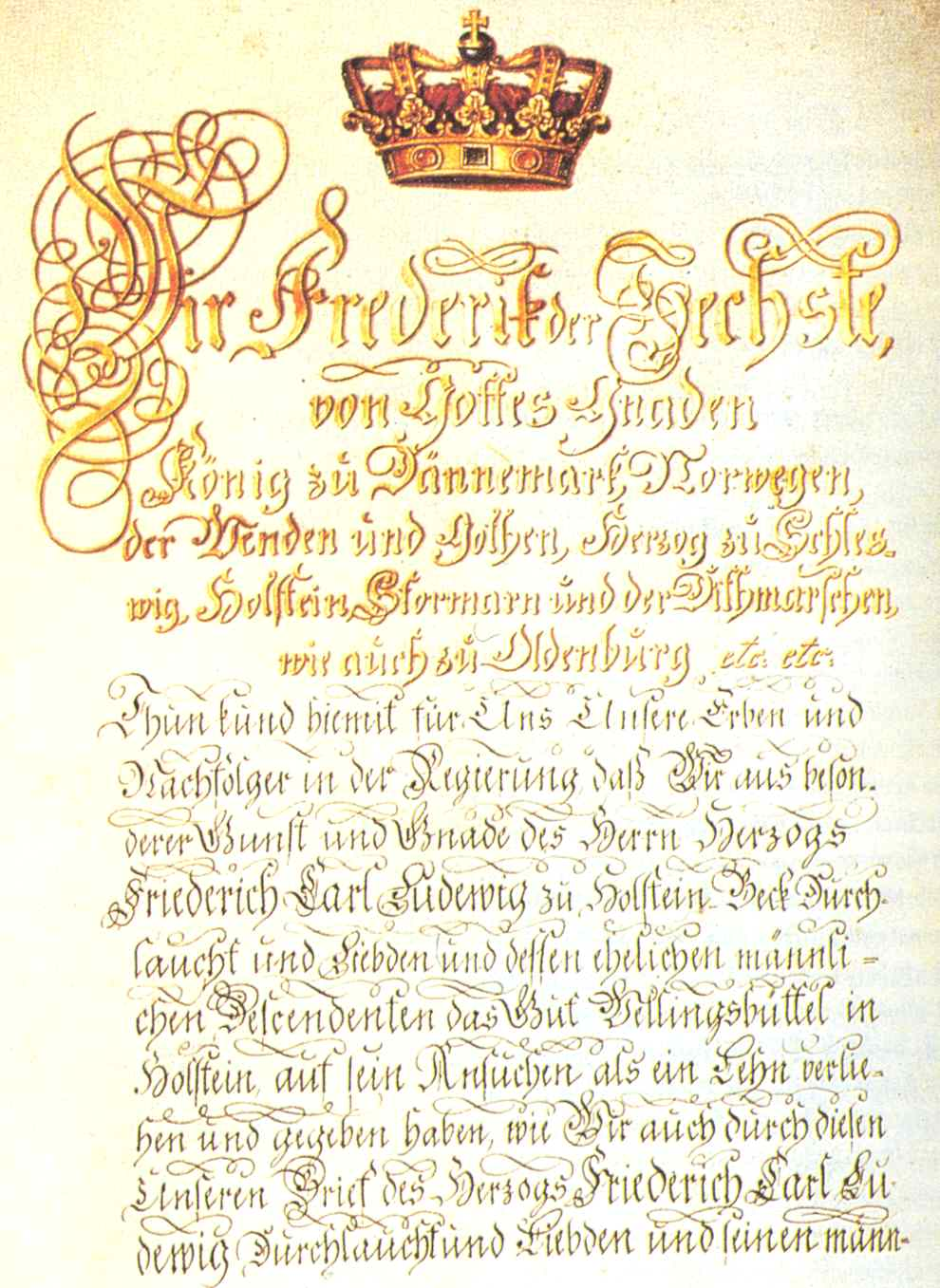
Deed of enfeoffment of Friedrich Karl Ludwig, Duke of Schleswig-Holstein-Sonderburg-Beck with Wellingsbüttel Manor by Frederick VI of Denmark (1810); now on display in the Alstertal Museum in the manor gatehouse

Wellingsbüttel was first mentioned in 1296. In 1412 Wellingsbüttel became the property of the archbishops of Bremen. In the 16th century the first Lusthaus was built on the site. In 1643 it became a fiefdom of the chancellor of the last archbishop, Dietrich Reinking. After the Peace of Westphalia (1648) Wellingsbüttel came to Sweden but remained in the possession of Reinking, as confirmed in 1649 by Christina of Sweden. Reinking was a count palatine and claimed imperial immediacy for Wellingsbüttel, which lasted until 1806.

In 1673 Baron (Freiherr) Theobald von Kurtzrock acquired the property. A Roman Catholic, he was imperial privy councillor (Kaiserlicher Reichshofrat), imperial ambassador to Lower Saxony (residierender k. k. Minister am Niedersächsischen Kreis) and master of postal services for the Thurn-und-Taxis-Post (Thurn- und Taxischer Postmeister). Theobald Joseph von Kurtzrock erected the present manor house (Herrenhaus) in 1750 next to the Alster River. In 1757 Georg Greggenhofer designed the gatehouse. In 1806 Wellingsbüttel was occupied by Danish troops and Clemens August von Kurtzrock was forced to sell it to Frederick VI of Denmark, when the king picked a quarrel over his alleged right to levy a toll on everyone crossing over the lands of the estate, which was at that time encircled by Danish territory.

In 1810 the king enfeoffed his relative General Friedrich Karl Ludwig, Duke of Schleswig-Holstein-Sonderburg-Beck, with Wellingsbüttel, which he elevated to a "chancellery manor" (Kanzleigut), that is, a manor directly subordinated to the royal chancellery at Copenhagen and permitted to operate its own manor court. At the same time the manor was separated from the small village of the same name, substantially reducing the number of poor people for whose support the lord of the manor was responsible. Duke Friedrich Karl Ludwig, by his only son Friedrich Wilhelm, the last Duke of Schleswig-Holstein-Sonderburg-Beck and the first of the House of Schleswig-Holstein-Sonderburg-Glücksburg, was an ancestor to both Queen Elizabeth II and Prince Philip, Duke of Edinburgh, as well as to the royal houses of Denmark, Norway, Iceland and Greece, including Queen Sofía of Spain, thus making Wellingsbüttel Manor in some respects a point of origin of nearly all today's European royal dynasties. During the Napoleonic Wars the duke had to leave Wellingsbüttel. At first two squadrons of the Lützow Free Corps were stationed there. At the end of 1813 it became the headquarters of the Russian Lieutenant-General Alexander Ivanovich Ostermann-Tolstoy.

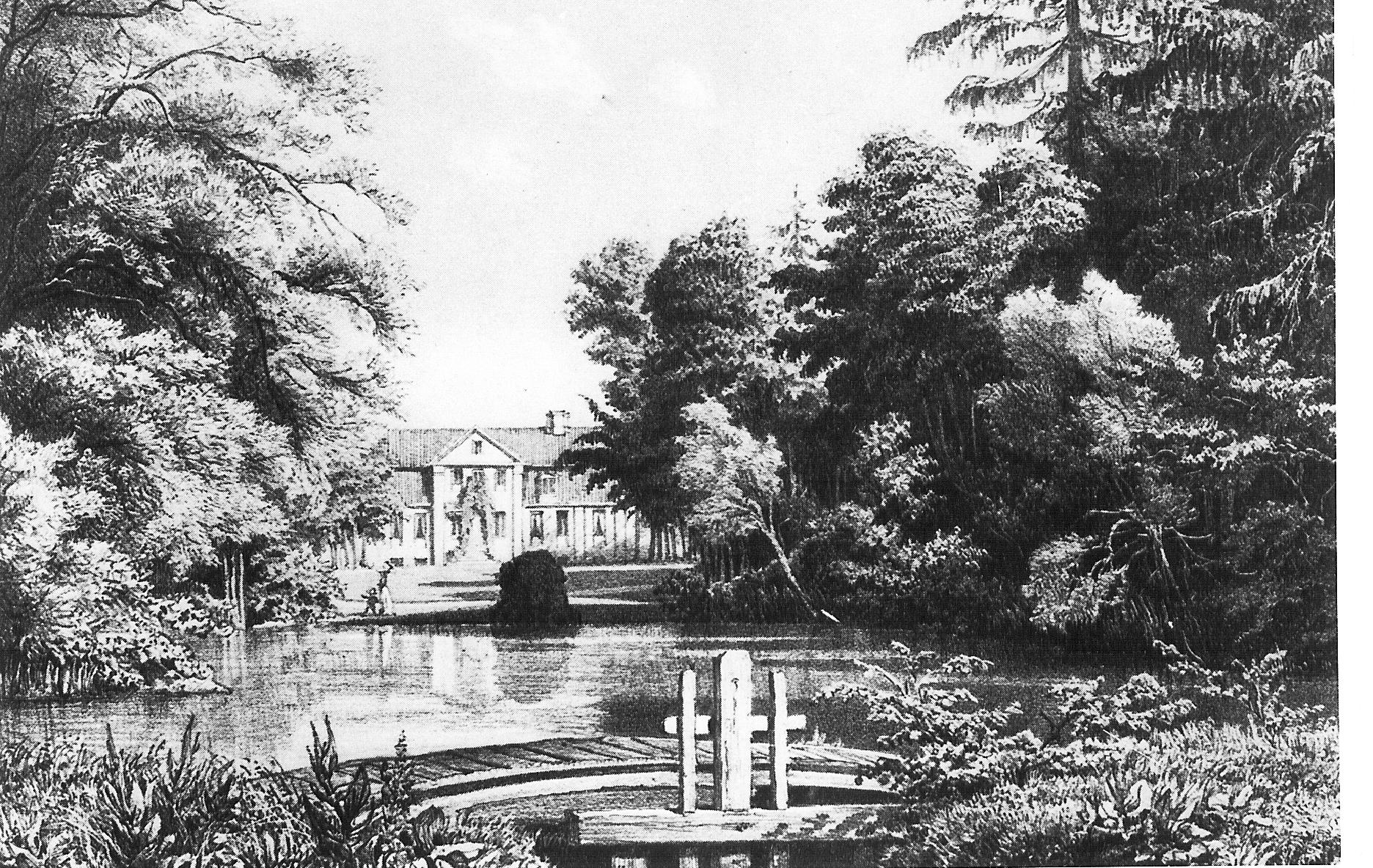
Wellingsbüttel Manor, park elevation with the pond made by damming the Alster River (1850)

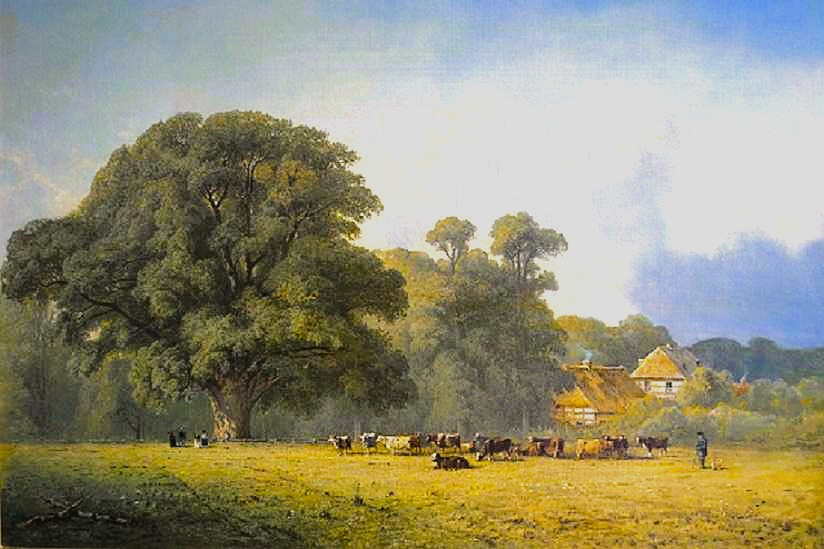
Outing at Wellingsbüttel Manor: Carl Jauch (left) and his wife Louise née von Plessen (far left) (1868)

In 1846 the Grand Burgher of the Free and Hanseatic City of Hamburg Johann Christian Jauch junior (1802–1880), a member of the Jauch family, became Lord of Wellingsbüttel. As a result of the Second Schleswig War, when Denmark fought Prussia and Austria, Wellingsbüttel was annexed by Prussia in 1868 and became a part of the Province of Schleswig-Holstein but remained in the possession of the Jauchs. Johann Christian Jauch junior and his son Carl Jauch (1828–1888), who was Lord of Wellingsbüttel conjointly with his father, enlarged the area of the manor's grounds up to 1876 from 115 to 250 hectares by buying in numerous smallholdings of the impoverished rural population, demolishing all buildings and adding the lands to the manor's pleasure-grounds. The former proprietors were offered places in the almshouse in the nearby village of Wellingsbüttel, which was erected in 1858, and to which the Jauchs contributed fifty percent of the costs. However, a considerable number of dispossessed people left Wellingsbüttel entirely, in such numbers that the royal chancellery at Copenhagen intervened to ask the Jauchs to keep at least the farmsteads on the land they acquired, when the teacher in Wellingsbüttel village complained that the continuing reduction in the number of paying pupils was costing him his livelihood.

Instead of farming, Wellingsbüttel reached its zenith by becoming a place of social life and hunting. During the time of the Barons von Kurtzrock the Danish statesman Heinrich Carl von Schimmelmann had already been a hunting-guest. The Jauchs established a deer-park which became a major attraction for summer visitors from Hamburg. Wellingsbüttel and its park had already become an attraction for visitors from Hamburg earlier: the poet Friedrich Gottlieb Klopstock, for example, had mentioned his visit on 11 July 1756, and directories of the parks surrounding Hamburg listed the park of Wellingsbüttel Manor as belonging to "the most beautiful". Friedrich Johann Lorenz-Meyer described it as "Elysian abundance". The hunting-grounds were expanded by leasing the adjoining Duvenstedter Brook ("Duvenstedt swamps"), at that time part of the district of Stormarn. Today, after an interlude as the hunting-ground of Hamburg's Nazi Gauleiter Karl Kaufmann, the swamps are the town's largest and most beautiful nature reserve. The cooks and servants employed by the Jauchs became ancestors of a number of the present-day families of Wellingsbüttel. Wellingsbüttel was also the birthplace of the Freikorps leader during the German Revolution of 1918–19, Colonel Hans Jauch (1883–1965).

In 1888 Robert Jauch of Krummbek Manor (1859–1909) and his siblings sold Wellingsbüttel Manor to Cäcilie Behrens, the widow of a Hamburg banker, a partner in L. Behrens & Söhne. She had the manor house heightened by one storey by the architect Martin Haller, but died soon after the completion of the works in 1892.

In 1910 the then owner, Otto Jonathan Hübbe, a Hamburg merchant, made Wellingsbüttel part of a limited company (Aktiengesellschaft), jointly with the owners of the manors of Poppenbüttel and Sasel, in order to subdivide the land and to develop the Alster valley for housing. After World War I the company went into bankruptcy. With the Greater Hamburg Act Wellingsbüttel became part of Hamburg in 1937 and gave its name to the district of Hamburg-Wellingsbüttel, today a suburban villa development.

The city of Hamburg sold Wellingsbüttel Manor in 1966. The Hansa Kolleg, co-owned by the states of Bremen, Hamburg, and Schleswig-Holstein, used the manor house as a student hall of residence from 1964 till 1996. Today the house contains a private nursing home and a restaurant.

== Alstertal Museum ==
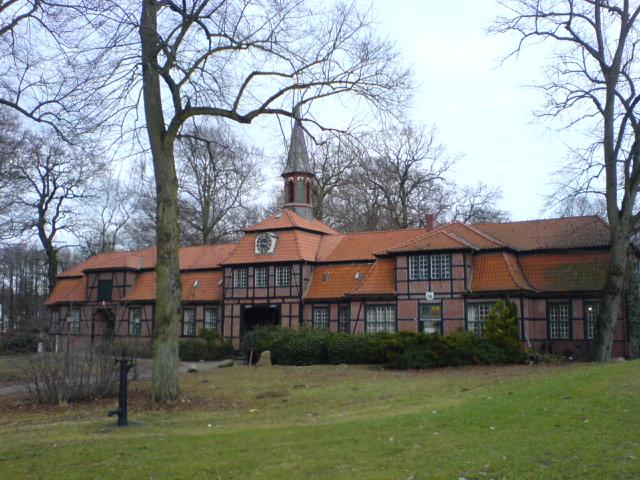
The gatehouse seen from the courtyard, the right wing is now occupied by the Alstertal Museum

Since 1957 the Alstertal Museum (Alstertalmuseum or "Museum of the Alster Valley") has occupied the left wing of the gatehouse (seen from the entrance to the manor). The museum, set up by the Alsterverein e.V., a society founded in 1900 for the preservation of the Alster Valley, presents a number of exhibitions, both permanent and changing, on aspects of the area of the Upper Alster. The permanent displays cover Wellingsbüttel, not only the estate and manor house but also the old village, including (with the permission of the Danish Crown) the only copy of the 1810 deed of enfeoffment of the Duke of Schleswig-Holstein-Sonderburg-Beck (see image above).

== Sources ==
- Bombeck, Natalie: Jauchs Vorfahren waren Wellingsbütteler, in Hamburger Abendblatt 25 January 2007
- Fiege, Hartwig, 1982: Geschichte Wellingsbüttels - Vom holsteinischen Dorf und Gut zum hamburgischen Stadtteil. Neumünster ISBN 3-529-02668-9
- Fiege, Hartwig, 1984: Über die Wellingsbütteler Gutsbesitzerfamilie Jauch in: Jahrbuch des Alstervereins 1984, Hamburg
- Pietsch, Ulrich, 1977: Georg Greggenhofer, 1719–1779, fürstbischöflicher Baumeister an der Residenz Eutin. Ein Beitrag zum Backsteinbarock in Schleswig-Holstein.. 1977
- Rackowitz, Dorothee, and Caspar von Baudissin, 1993: 700 Jahre Wellingsbüttel 1296–1996. Hamburg ISBN 3-925800-06-9

== See also ==
- List of castles in Hamburg
- List of museums and cultural institutions in Hamburg
