= List of diplomatic missions in Hamburg =

Map of countries with consular missions in Hamburg (2009); dark blue for active and light blue for former (diplomatic) missions.

List of consular and (until 1918) diplomatic missions in Hamburg.

== History ==
Hamburg's history of diplomatic relations with foreign countries started in the 16th century, in that time the city was a free imperial city. The first missions from the city of Hamburg to other countries date back to the Middle Ages and Hamburg's participation in the Hanseatic league. At first representatives were called Oldermänner or by the English term "Courtmaster", later in the style of the common "Consul". As of 2009, there were 100 consulates in Hamburg, ranked the third-largest in the world (after New York City and Hong Kong) and largest in Europe. The consuls are official representatives of the government of a foreign state to the city of Hamburg, normally acting to assist the citizens of the consul's own country, to represent his country's interests, and to facilitate trade and friendship between the people of Hamburg and the country of which he is a representative. There are several consuls providing assistance with bureaucratic issues to both, the citizens of the consul's own country travelling or living abroad, and to Hamburg's citizens (and often Northern Germany, e.g. the Consulate-general of Japan), who wish to trade with the consul's country (e.g. information about visa or customs duties). Consuls are also patrons of fairs or exhibitions, like US Consul General Karen E. Johnson was the patron of the Youth Exchange Fair in September 2009.

In the 19th century Hamburg was an important location for diplomatic missions, because of the prestige gained by the Hanseatic cities and the importance as a centre of commerce. The trade and independent striving of the Hanseatic cities of Bremen, Lübeck and Hamburg for the "common German service" were even named in the Westphalian peace treaty in 1648, and the Hanseatic and later Hamburgian consuls during the 16th, 17th and 18th centuries were also representatives for "all fellow Germans". The Senate of Hamburg often opened a consulate to cities and countries, if a trade post existed, esp. by shipping. There were very few cities like Dresden—then capital of Saxony—without a sea port. Treaties were signed, if a proper unsalaried candidate for the position had been found. Article 23 of the treaty between the Hanseatic cities and Guatemala signed on 25 June 1847 decreed the bilateral deployment of consuls, or article 9 of the treaty with Sardinia ruled the judicial authority of the Hanseatic consuls. Even in the 20th century, the importance of Hamburg is emphasized by the position of the port of Hamburg in the world's ranking. In 2007, it was one of the busiest container ports of the world. In the segment of transshipment Hamburg was in a leading position in 2004. In 2005, the port handled more containers with destination or provenance in Germany as Bremerhaven and Rotterdam combined.

The first mission established, was from Austria (then Habsburg monarchy) in 1570, the Slovak Republic's consulate was the 100th in 2006, and the last one was the consulate of the Palau (as of 2009), former German colony from 1899 until 1918/19. The first missions visiting Hamburg often were trade missions of foreign countries. During the Thirty Years' War (1618–1648) constant diplomatic missions were needed, most of those envoys or residents were Hamburg citizens—only large and most influential states sent own nationals. Some countries sent their missions from 1815 – 1886, at this time Hamburg was an independent and sovereign state of the German Confederation.

== List ==
Legend

- Consulate-general
- Consulate
- Honorary consulate-general
- Honorary consulate

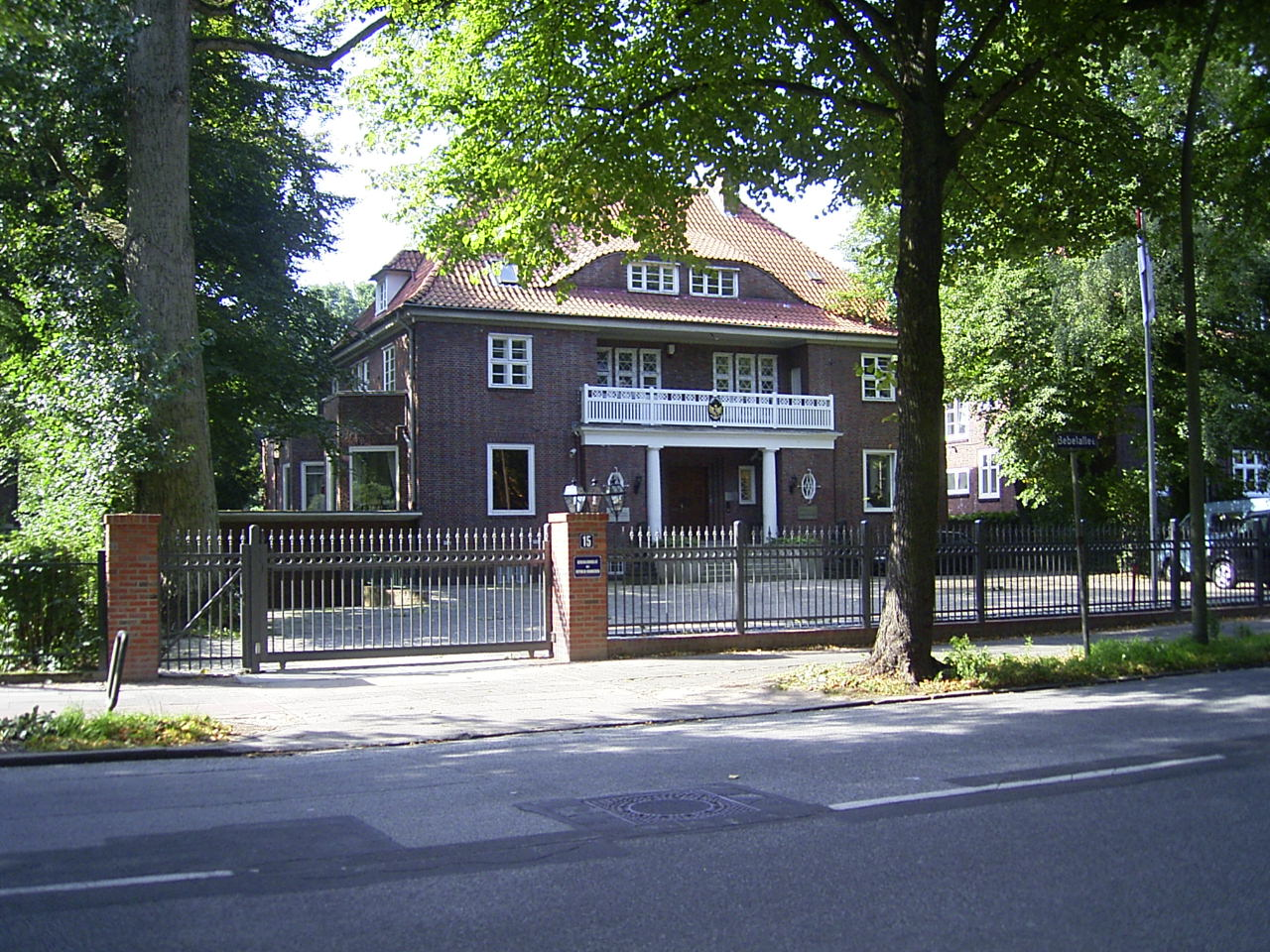
Consulate-general of the Republic of Indonesia

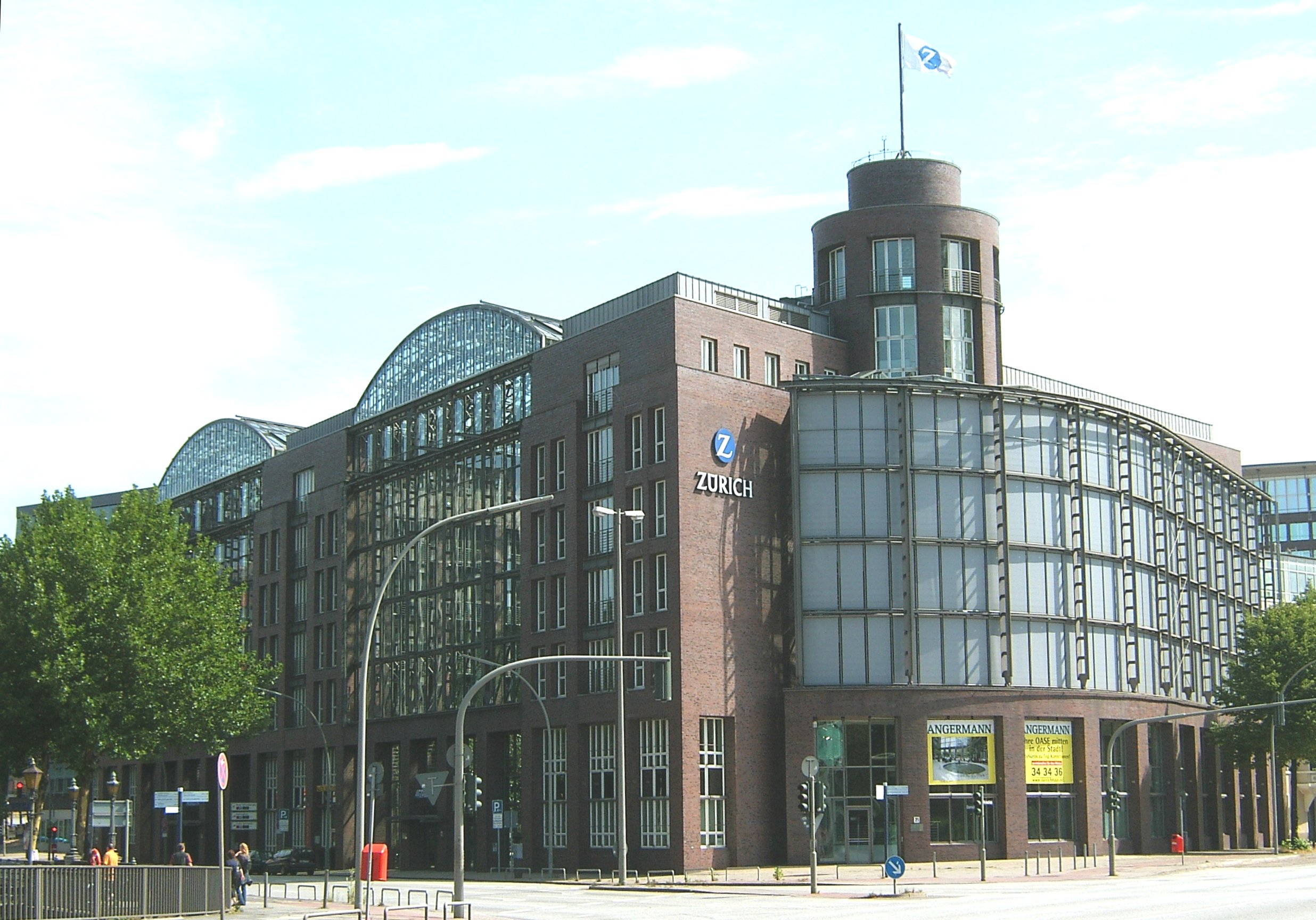
Consulate-general of Japan

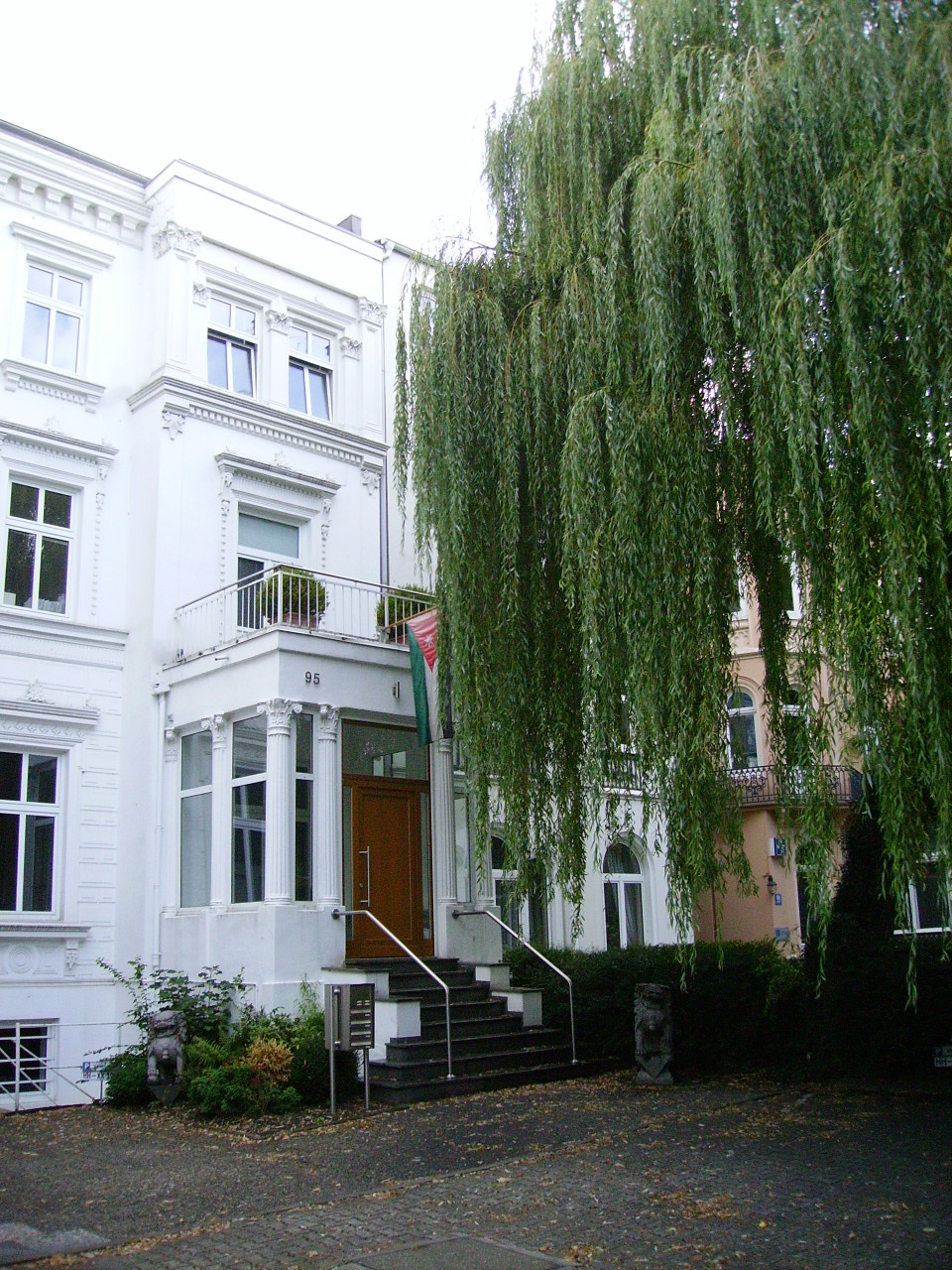
Honorary consulate of Jordan

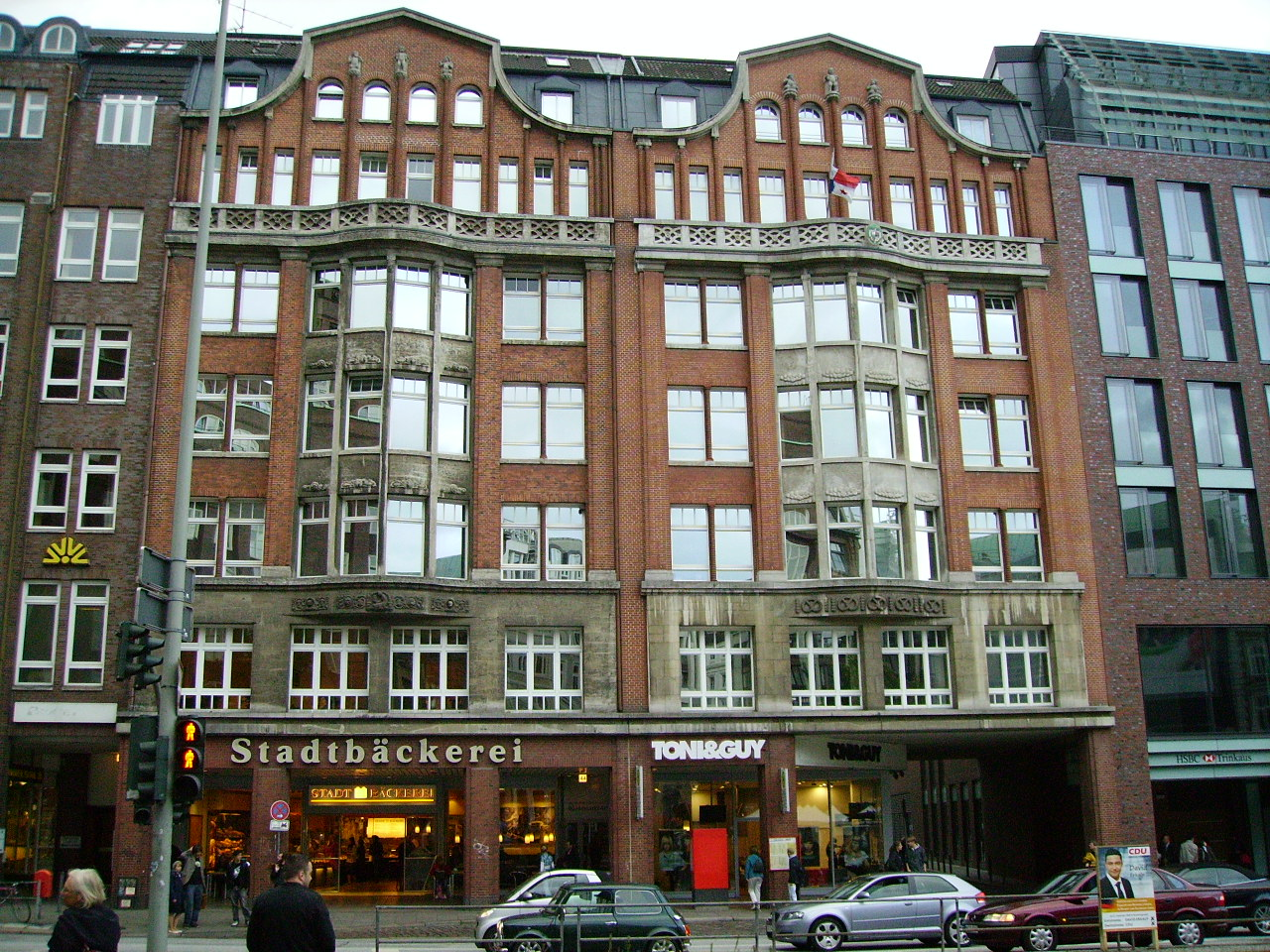
Office building at Gänsemarkt in the Neustadt quarter with the Panamanian consulate-general

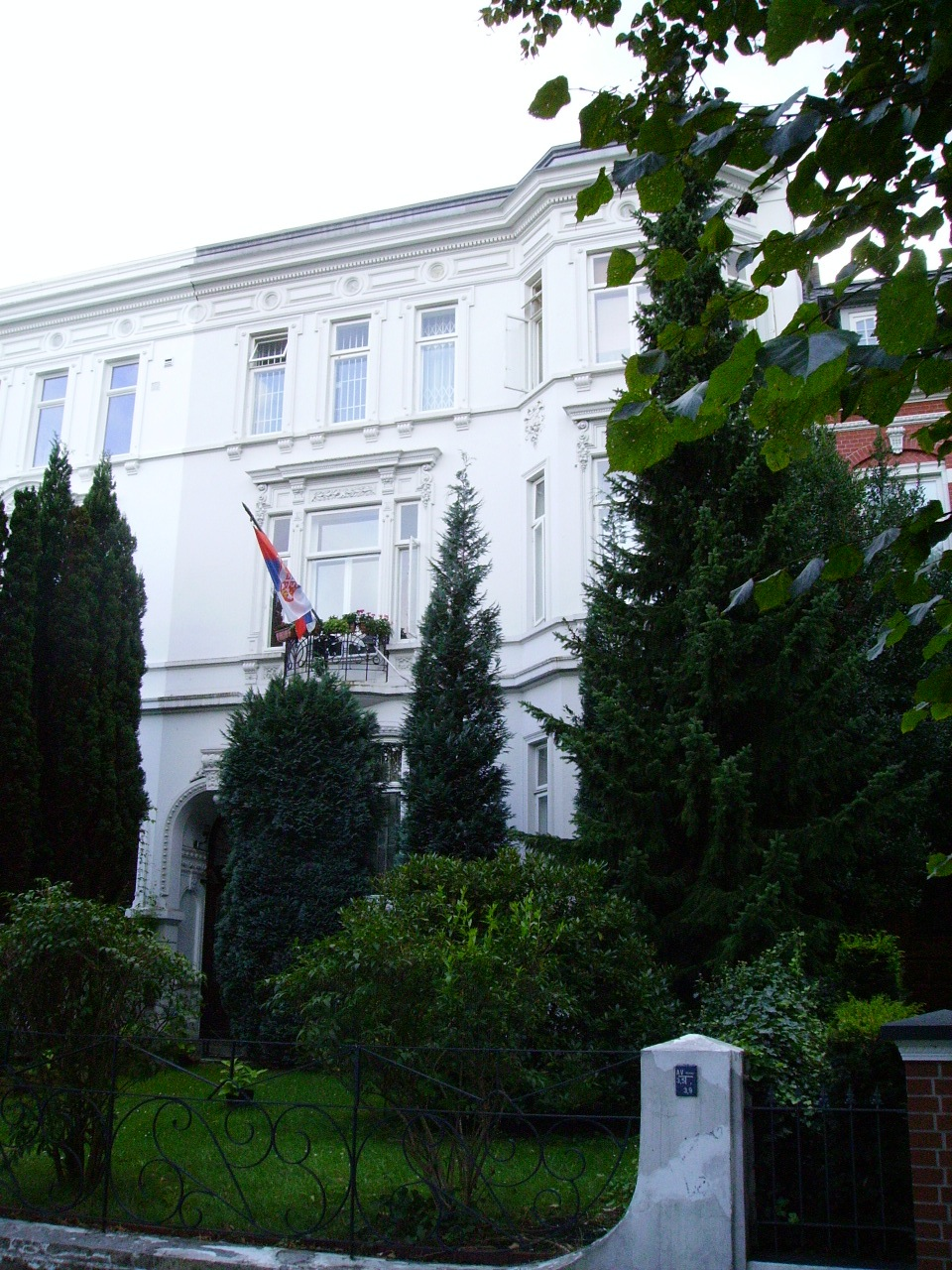
Consulate-General of Serbia

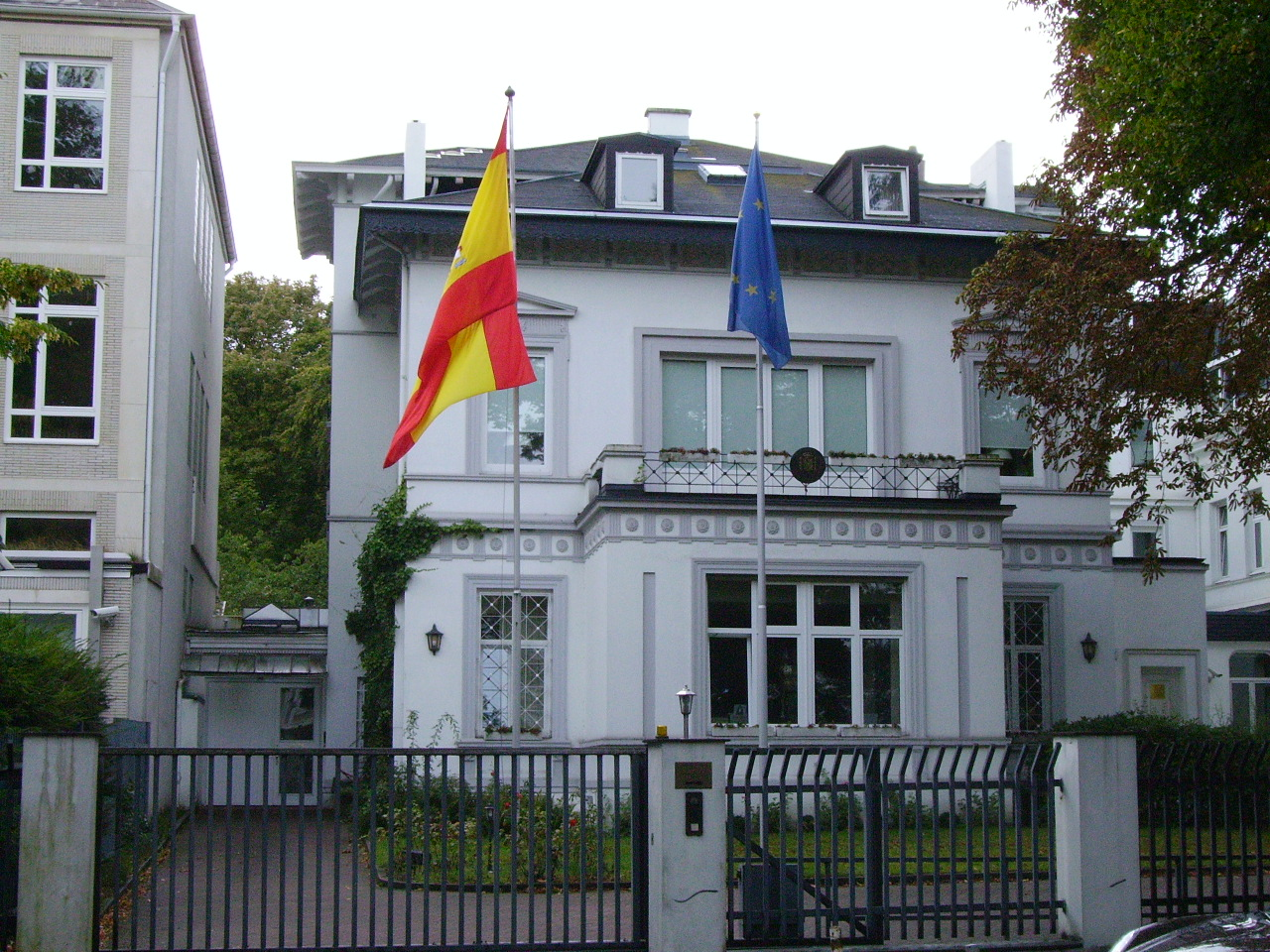
Consulate-general of Spain

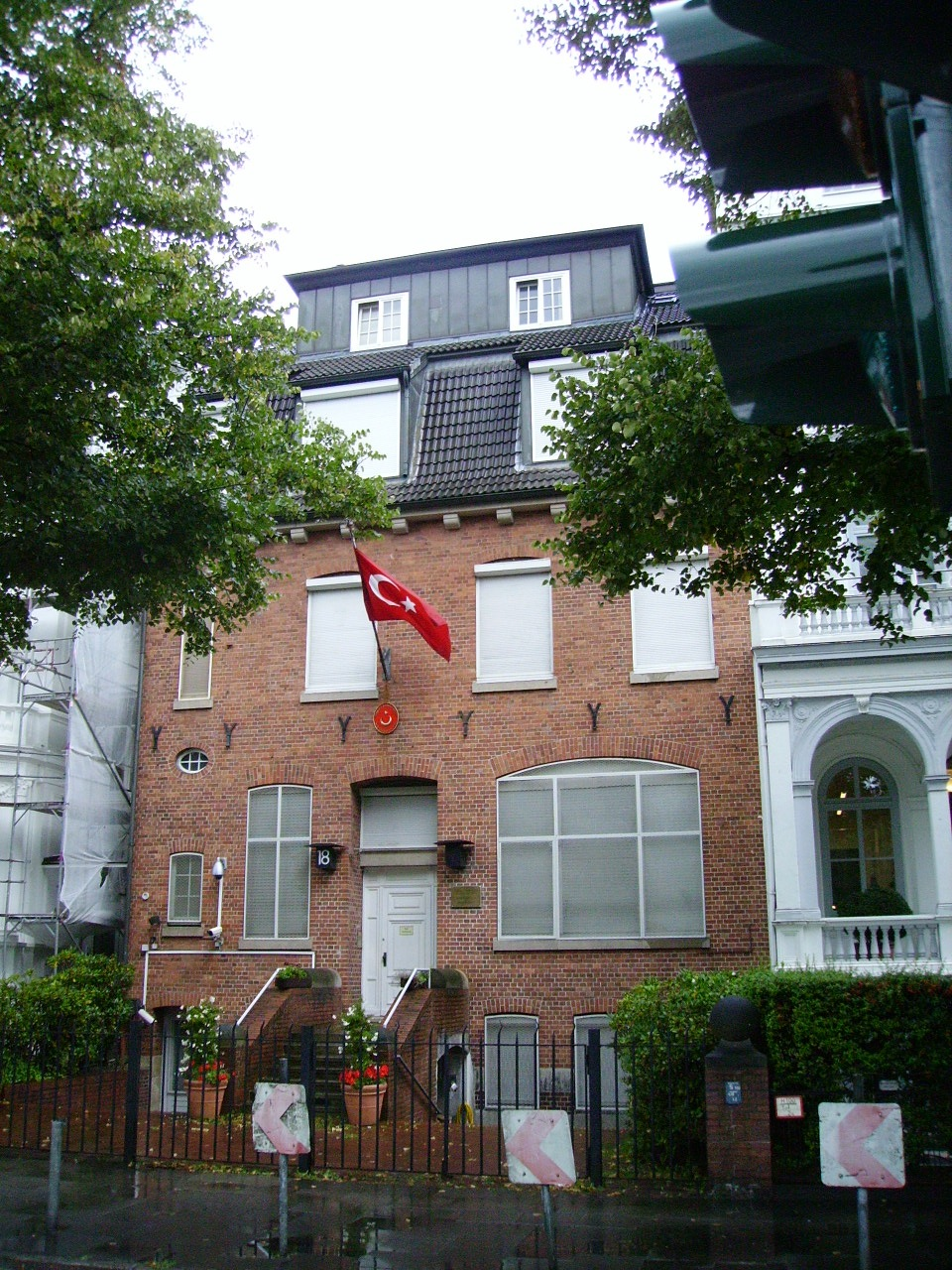
Consulate-General of Turkey

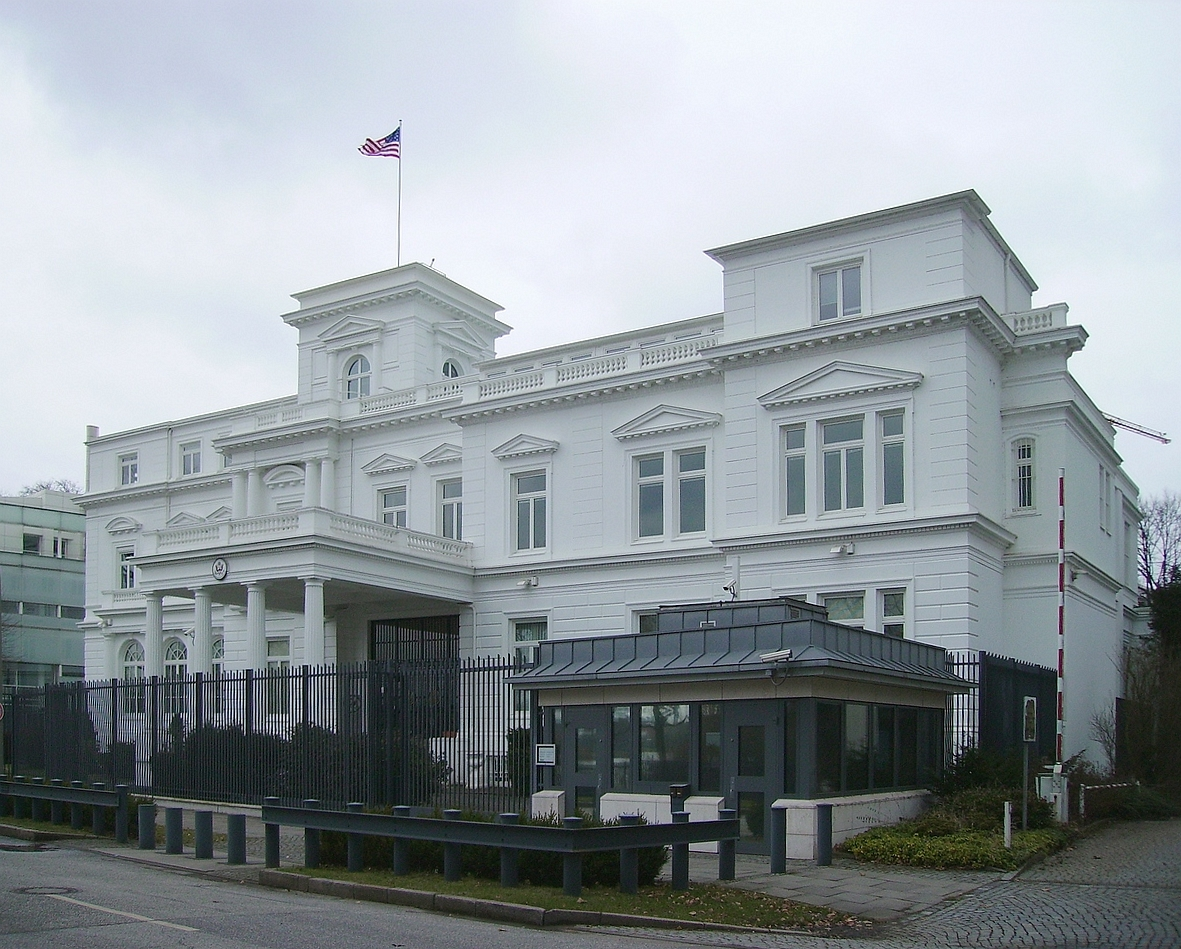
Consulate-general of the United States

Mission	Date	Address	Notes	Rank (Note: The protocolic rank of the consul in Hamburg depends on the type of the mission and the term in office (As of July 2009).)
Argentina	1835	Mittelweg 141, 20148 Hamburg		2009
Austria	1570	Alsterufer 37, 20354 Hamburg	In 2009 the Foreign Ministry stated its intention to close the mission in 2010.	2006
Bangladesh	1975	Billhorner Kanalstraße 69, 20539 Hamburg		2005
Belgium	1832	Langenhorner Markt 9, 22415 Hamburg		1997
Bolivia	1855	Heimhuder Straße 33 a, 20148 Hamburg		1997
Botswana	1971	Berzeliusstraße 45, 22113 Hamburg		2007
Brazil			Closed	
Bulgaria	1993	Alstertor 15, 20095 Hamburg		1997
Canada			Closed	
Cape Verde	1986	Deichstraße 9, 20459 Hamburg		2003
Czech	1992	Feldbrunnenstrasse 72, 20148 Hamburg		2003
Chile	1835	Hirschgraben 30, 22089 Hamburg		2008
China	1921	Elbchaussee 268, 22605 Hamburg		2003
Colombia	1845	Wendenstr. 29, 20097 Hamburg		2003
Costa Rica	1850	Meyerhofstraße 8, 22609 Hamburg		1983
Croatia	1994	Hermannstraße 16, 20095 Hamburg	Doyen (senior member of the consulate corps)	2003
Cyprus	1990	Rothenbaumchaussee 3, 20148 Hamburg		
Denmark	1648	Hermannstraße 16, 20095 Hamburg		2007
Dominican Republic	1857	Heimhuder Straße 77, 20148 Hamburg		2005
Ecuador	1846	Rothenbaumchaussee 221, 20149 Hamburg		2008
El Salvador	1867	Raboisen 32, 20095 Hamburg		2004
Egypt	1976	Mittelweg 183, 20148 Hamburg		2008
Estonia	1993	Badestraße 38, 20148 Hamburg		1993
France	1579	Heimhuder Straße 55, 20148 Hamburg		2006
Finland	1921	Esplanade 41, 20354 Hamburg		2005
Ghana	1963	Lübecker Str. 1, 22087 Hamburg		1998
Greece	1836	Neue ABC-Straße 10, 20354 Hamburg		2005
Guatemala	1960	Esplanade 6, 20354 Hamburg		2003
Guinea	1990	Rehwechsel 28, 21224 Rosengarten		1993
Haiti	1951	Tinsdaler Kirchenweg 275 a, 22559 Hamburg		2005
Honduras	1869	An der Alster 21, 20099 Hamburg		2007
Hungary	1992	Alsterufer 45, 20354 Hamburg	From 1919 to 1929, the Hungarian government maintained a consulate there; from 1929 to 1937 (?), an honorary consul general served in the city. Since 1992, there has once again been an honorary consul general in Hamburg.	1995
Iceland	1949	Gertrudenstrasse 3, 20095 Hamburg		2005
India	1954	Graumannsweg 57, 22087 Hamburg		2007
Indonesia	1956	Bebelallee 15, 22299 Hamburg	Former consulate-general closed in 2013.	2007
Iran	1858	Bebelallee 18, 22299 Hamburg		2006
Ireland	1962	Feldbrunnenstraße 43, 20148 Hamburg		1991
Italy	1816	Feldbrunnenstraße 54, 20148 Hamburg	Closed on 20 June 2010	2009
Jamaica	1969	Ballindamm 1, 20095 Hamburg		1993
Japan	1883	Domstraße 19, 20095 Hamburg		2008
Jordan	1964	Rothenbaumchaussee 95, 20148 Hamburg		2005
Kazakhstan	1994	Rothenbaumchaussee 40, 20148 Hamburg		2007
Kenya	1992	Rathausstraße 6, 20095 Hamburg		1992
Kiribati	1990	Neumühlen 13, 22763 Hamburg		1990
South Korea	1886	Kaiser-Wilhelm-Str. 9, 20355 Hamburg		2008
Kyrgyzstan	1996	Am Sandtorkai 77, 20457 Hamburg		1996
Latvia	1925	Neuer Wall 72, 20354 Hamburg		1997
Liberia	1952		In the 1920s, Momolu Massaquoi was the first African consulate in Europe. Closed	
Lithuania	1994	Brodschrangen 4, 20457 Hamburg		1998
Luxembourg	1921	An der Alster 9, 20099 Hamburg		2007
Macedonia	2006	Adenauerallee 25, 20097 Hamburg		2006
Madagascar	1963	Habichtstraße 41, 22305 Hamburg		1999
Malawi	1969	Elbchaussee 419, 22609 Hamburg		1987
Malaysia	1959	Kajen 2, 20459 Hamburg		1996
Malta	1970	Große Elbstrasse 145 F, 22767 Hamburg		2002
Mexico	1829	Kleine Reichenstraße 1, 20457 Hamburg		2005
Moldova	2000	Haldesdorferstraße 46, 22179 Hamburg		2000
Monaco	1954	Neuer Jungfernstieg 20, 20354 Hamburg		1998
Morocco	1960	In de Bargen 4, 22587 Hamburg		2007
Mozambique	2007	Große Elbstraße 138, 22767 Hamburg		2007
Namibia	1997	An der Alster 82, 20099 Hamburg		1997
Nepal	1998	Jungfernstieg 44, 20354 Hamburg		1998
Netherlands			Closed on 1 July 2009	
New Zealand	1992	Domstraße 19, 20095 Hamburg		2007
Nicaragua	1859	Max-Brauer-Allee 20, 22765 Hamburg		1997
Niger	1970	Fischertwiete 2, 20095 Hamburg		1988
Norway	1906	ABC-Straße 19, 20354 Hamburg		2006
Palau	2008	Rutschbahn 6, 20146 Hamburg		2008
Pakistan	1962	Max-Brauer-Allee 45, 22765 Hamburg		2008
Panama	1905	Gänsemarkt 44, 20354 Hamburg		2004
Papua New Guinea	1990	Mattentwiete 5, 20457 Hamburg		1990
Paraguay	1872	Elbchaussee 439, 22609 Hamburg		2007
Peru	1843	Blumenstraße 28, 22301 Hamburg		2004
Philippines	1958		Closed	
Poland	1921	Gründgensstraße 20, 22309 Hamburg		2008
Portugal	1658	Büschstr. 7 – I., 20354 Hamburg		2005
Romania	1883	Oberaltenallee 20a, 22081 Hamburg		2006
Russia	1709	Am Feenteich 20, 22085 Hamburg		2005
Saint Kitts and Nevis	2008	Van-der-Smissen-Straße 2, 22767 Hamburg		2008
Samoa	2008	Oderfelder Straße 23, 20149 Hamburg		2008
Senegal	1965	Frankenstrasse 3, 20097 Hamburg		2001
Serbia	2004	Harvestehuder Weg 101, 20149 Hamburg		
Seychelles	1984	Billwerder Neuer Deich 14, 20539 Hamburg		1997
Slovakia	1995	Jungfernstieg 38, 20354 Hamburg		2006
Slovenia	1994	Ballindamm 8, 20095 Hamburg		1994
South Africa	1896	Palmaille 45, 22767 Hamburg		2003
Spain	1626	Mittelweg 37, 20148 Hamburg		2006
Sri Lanka	1966	Pickhuben 9, 20457 Hamburg		1974
Sweden	1630	Ditmar-Koel-Strasse 36, 20459 Hamburg		2008
Switzerland	1846	Rathausmarkt 5, 20095 Hamburg	The mission was the second Swiss mission to German territory (in 1835 a mission was established in Leipzig). In 1958 Switzerland upgraded the Hamburg consulate to a consulate-general.	2005
Syria	1992	Osakaallee 11, 20457 Hamburg		1992
Tanzania	1992	Franz Rabe Strasse 23, 25474 Bönningstedt		1992
Thailand	1881	An der Alster 85, 20099 Hamburg		1990
Tonga	1983	Habichtstraße 41, 22305 Hamburg		2001
Tuvalu	1985	An der Alster 45, 20099 Hamburg		2003
Trinidad and Tobago	1998	Raboisen 3, 20095 Hamburg		1998
Tunisia	1972	Lübecker Straße 1, 22087 Hamburg		2005
Turkey	1844	Tesdorpfstraße 18, 20148 Hamburg		
Uganda	1987	Dornkamp 18, 22869 Schenefeld		1987
Ukraine	2002	Mundsburger Damm 1, 22087 Hamburg		2007
Uruguay	1838	Hochallee 76, 20149 Hamburg		2009
UK	1632	Neuer Jungfernstieg 20, 20354 Hamburg	See also: List of diplomats from the United Kingdom to the Hanseatic League Former consulate-general closed in 2006. || 2007	
USA	1793	Alsterufer 27/28, 20354 Hamburg	Consulate General of the United States in Hamburg	2007
Venezuela	1833		Closed 2019	
Yemen	2006	Martinistr. 18, 20251 Hamburg		2006
FR Yugoslavia			Closed	
Zambia	2004	Neuer Wall 19, 20354 Hamburg		2004
