= Jenisch House =

- Jenisch-Haus
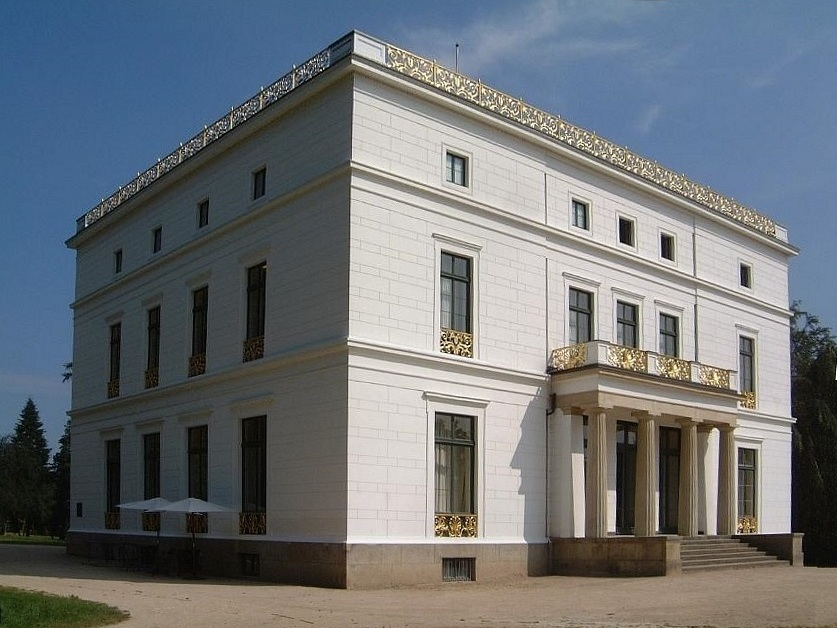
- Front elevation (2004)
- Interactive fullscreen map

General information
- Type: Country house
- Architectural style: Neoclassical
- Location: Borough of Altona, Jenisch Park; Othmarschen; Baron-Voght-Str. 50, Hamburg
- Coordinates: 53°33′09″N 9°51′56″E
- Construction started: 1831
- Completed: 1834

Technical details
- Floor count: 4

Design and construction
- Architects: Franz Forsmann; Karl Friedrich Schinkel

Jenisch House (Jenisch-Haus) is a country house in Hamburg built in the 19th century and an example of Hanseatic lifestyle and neoclassical architecture. As of 2008, Jenisch House is the home of the Museum für Kunst und Kultur an der Elbe. It is located within the Jenisch park in the Othmarschen quarter.

== History ==
The house was built by Franz Forsmann and Karl Schinkel for Martin Johann Jenisch between 1831 and 1834. Jenisch used it as a country house.

== Location ==
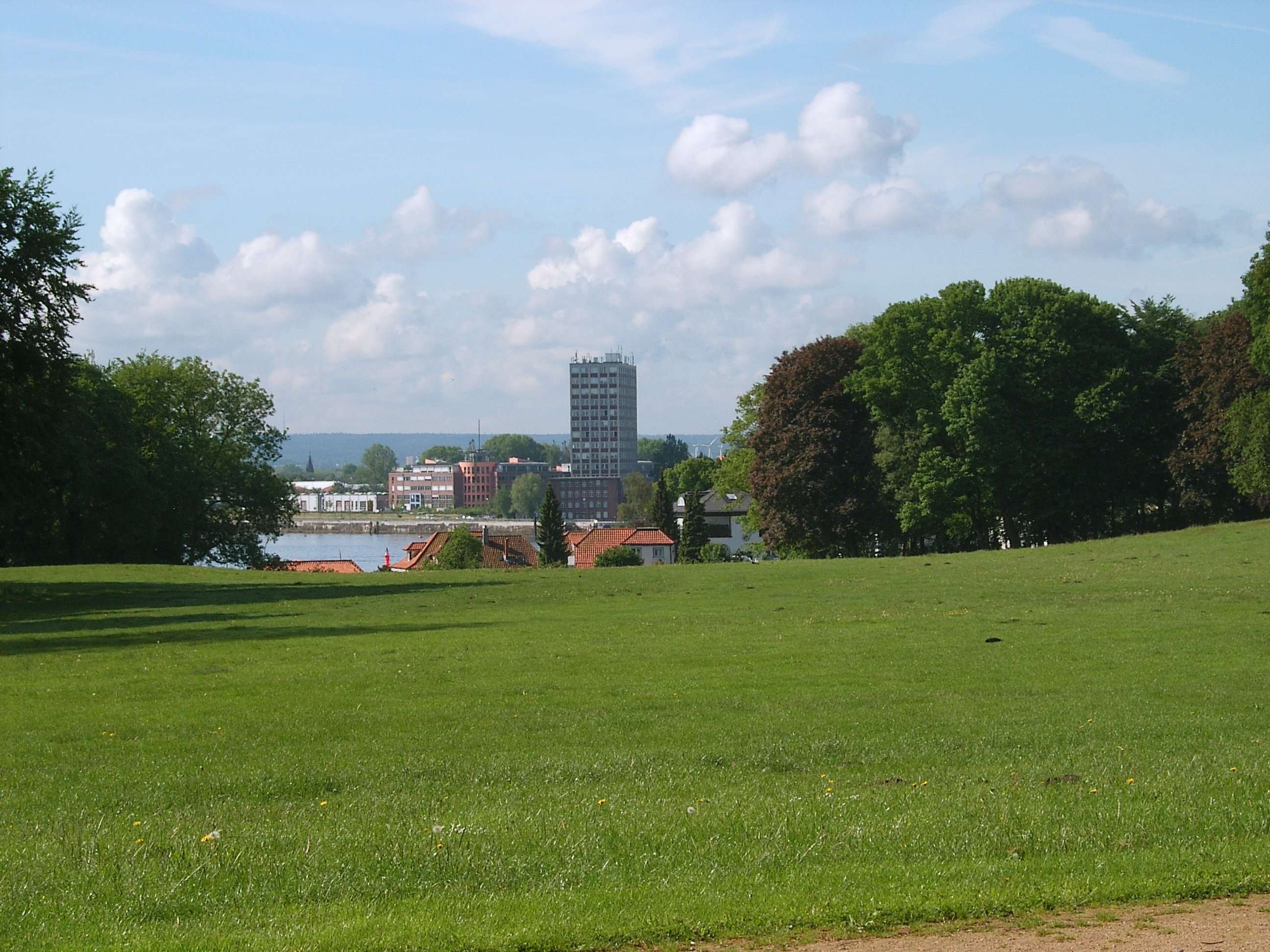
A view toward the Elbe river

Jenisch House is located in Jenisch Park, Hamburg's oldest landscaped park and a protected area of 43 ha (110 acres). The park was landscaped by Caspar Voght as a model farm and arboretum about 1800. It is located in the former independent locality of Klein Flottbek, now part of the Othmarschen quarter of Hamburg with a view toward the Elbe river, often described as "magnificent".

In 1828 Jenisch bought the farm and gardens from Voght and redesigned the area with the construction of his house.

Jenisch Park participated in the Tag des offenen Denkmals, a national annual event of the Deutsche Stiftung Denkmalschutz, opening cultural heritage sites to the public, in 2007 and 2008.

== Architecture ==
The house is designed as a large cube, with a basement, two main floors and an attic floor. The windows are in a 1-3-1 ratio and focus on the center. On the main floors the windows reach almost completely from the floor to the ceiling. The front of the house toward the park and Elbe river has a Doric portico, supporting a balcony. The large windows, the balcony, and the house opening into the park represent the relationship between architecture and nature.

== Functions ==
The ground floor has prestigious salons, while the first floor contained the living areas and the attics were for the servants. As of 2008, the Museum für Kunst und Kultur an der Elbe is located in Jenisch House, using it for exhibitions, marriages and other events. A terrace is occupied by a café for the museum.

== Neighborhood ==
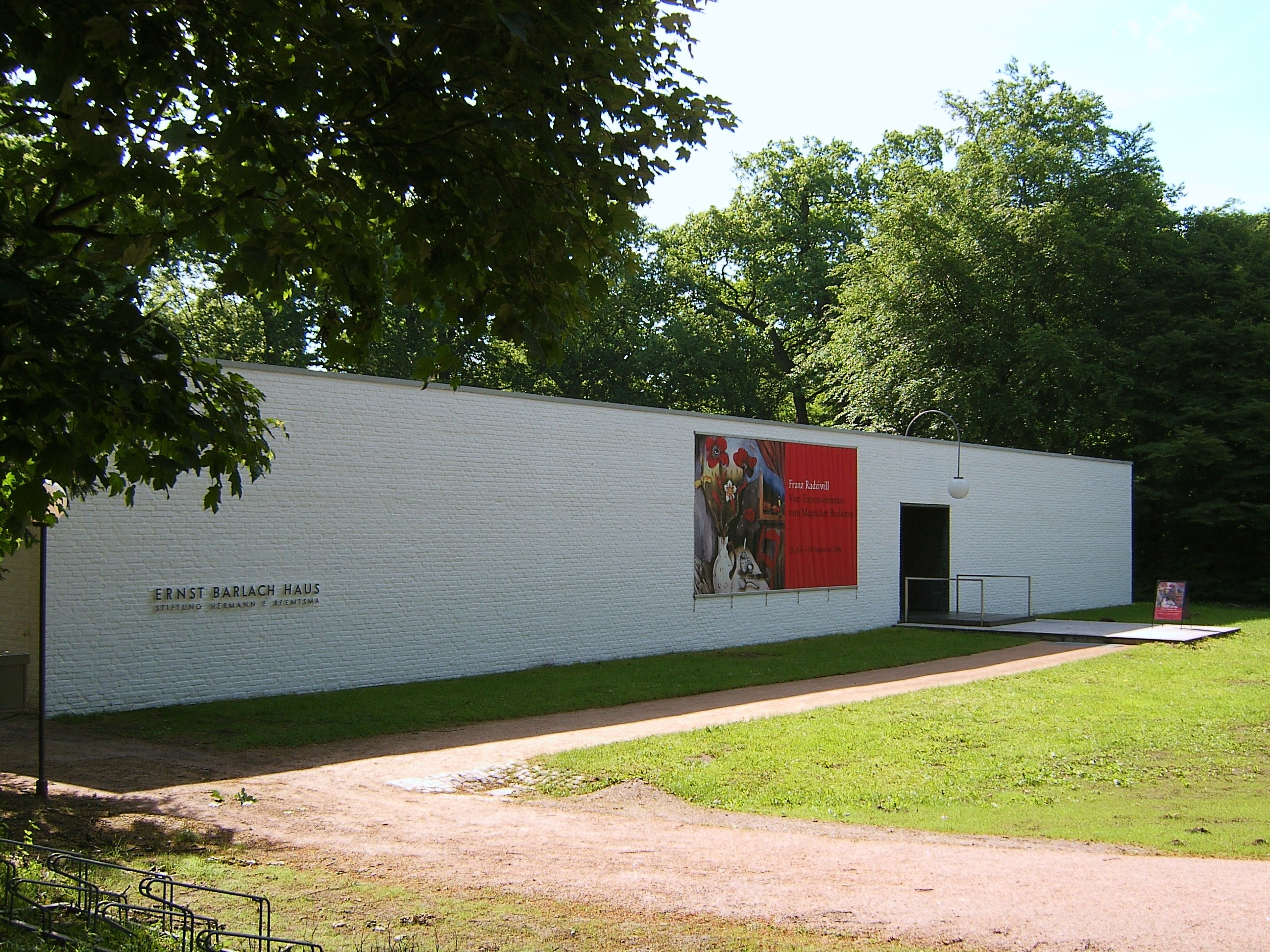
Ernst Barlach House

Jenisch House is located on the park's west side at Baron-Voght-Straße, a small residential street, and off Elbchaussee. The park itself reaches all the way down to the right bank of the Elbe river, at the other end somewhere near the Botanischer Garten Hamburg.

The Elbchaussee has many listed buildings; Jenisch House and Park are listed as well.

The Ernst Barlach House, located in the park, is a museum for the work of the expressionist sculptor, printmaker and writer Ernst Barlach (1870–1938).

== See also ==
- List of castles in Hamburg
- List of museums and cultural institutions in Hamburg
