= Jenisch park =

Landscaped park in Hamburg, Germany

Coordinates: 53.5525°N 9.8656°E

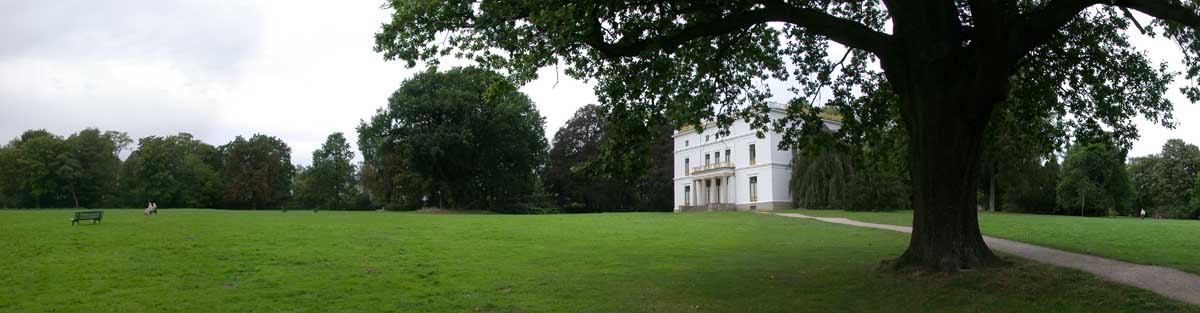
Panorama of park and Jenisch house

The Jenisch Park is the oldest landscaped park in Hamburg, Germany, located in the Othmarschen quarter at the Geest shore of River Elbe. Of the area of 43 ha (110 acres), 8 are a protected. Two museums, Jenisch House and Ernst Barlach House, are located within the park. The river Flottbek flows through the park and into the Elbe at Teufelsbrück.

== History ==
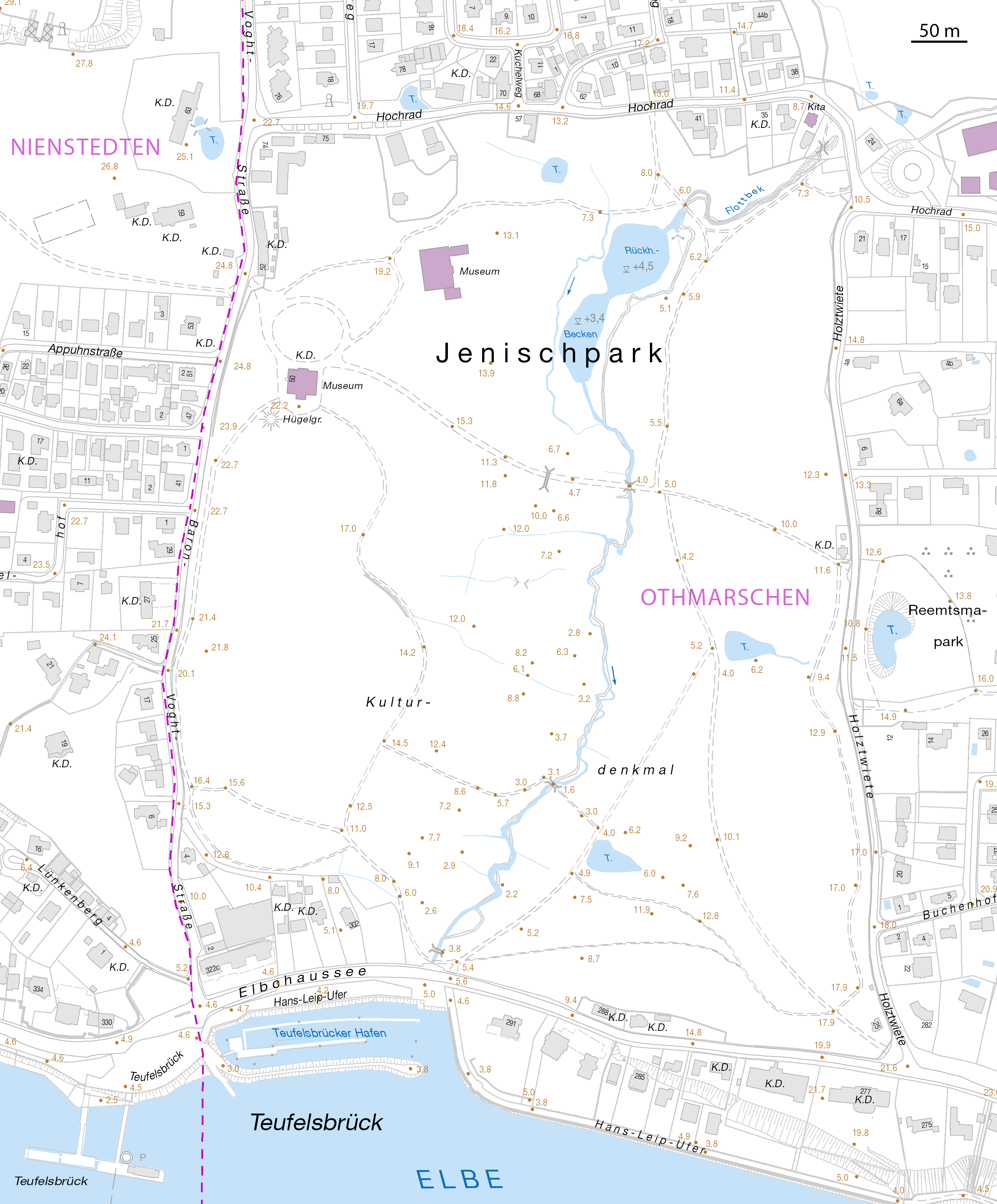
Map of Jenisch park

Caspar Voght acquired the area along with further nearby fields near Flottbek village from 1785 to 1805. There were four parts: Süderpark (Southern park, today's Jenisch park), Norderpark, (Northern park, today Loki-Schmidt-Garten, Hamburg's botanical garden), Osterpark (Eastern park, today partly a golf course), and Westerpark (Western park, tree nursery intermittently, today Westerpark again). Voght had been inspired by the Leasowes estate of English poet William Shenstone. The area was planned as a rural or ornamented farm and a Mustergut (model farm). He designed it along with landscape gardener James Booth.
