= Loki-Schmidt-Garten =

Botanical garden in Hamburg, Germany

Coordinates: 53°33′44″N 9°51′40″E

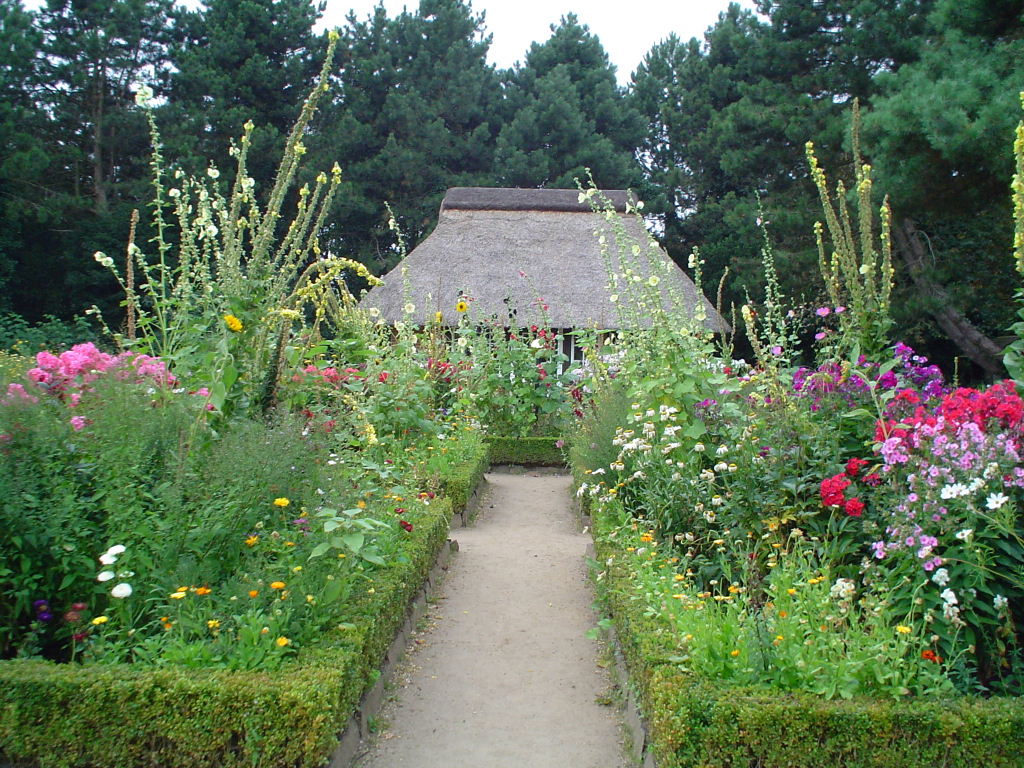
Botanischer Garten Hamburg

The Loki-Schmidt-Garten, also known as Botanischer Garten Hamburg, or, more formally, as Botanischer Garten der Universität Hamburg or Biozentrum Klein Flottbek und Botanischer Garten, is a botanical garden maintained by the University of Hamburg. It has a size of around 25 hectares and is located at Ohnhorststrasse 18, Hamburg, Germany, beside the Klein Flottbek station in the Osdorf quarter, and is open daily without charge. It was renamed in 2012 after Loki Schmidt, the wife of the former German chancellor Helmut Schmidt. Though it was renamed, the old name coexists with the new one. Nearby Klein Flottbek station still has the second name "Botanischer Garten".

== History ==
Although the garden's institutional history dates to its first establishment in 1821 and transfer in 1919 to the University of Hamburg, today's Loki-Schmidt-Garten, then Botanischer Garten Hamburg, opened in 1979. Its earlier site still remains as the Alter Botanischer Garten Hamburg, which contains the garden's greenhouses. Therefore, Loki-Schmidt-Garten is sometimes called Neuer Botanischer Garten (New Botanical Garden).

The compound of today's Botanischer Garten had initially been one of the four sections of the ornamented farm of Caspar Voght, then as Norderpark (Northern park). Süderpark (Southern park) is known as Jenisch park nowadays.

== Layout ==
The garden is organized into three major sections:

- Systematic garden (approximately 3.5 hectares (8.6 acres)) - 90 beds of plants organized by evolutionary relationship, as defined by Armen Takhtajan in 1959.
- Geographical garden - plants arranged by geographic origin, with areas for Europe, North America, southern South America, and East Asia. This section also includes an alpine garden, Japanese garden, and Chinese garden.
- Plant and man - five thematic gardens: Farmer's Garden, Biblical Garden, crops, pharmacy garden, and poisonous and medicinal plants.

== See also ==
- List of botanical gardens in Germany
