= Flottbek (Elbe) =

River in Hamburg, Germany

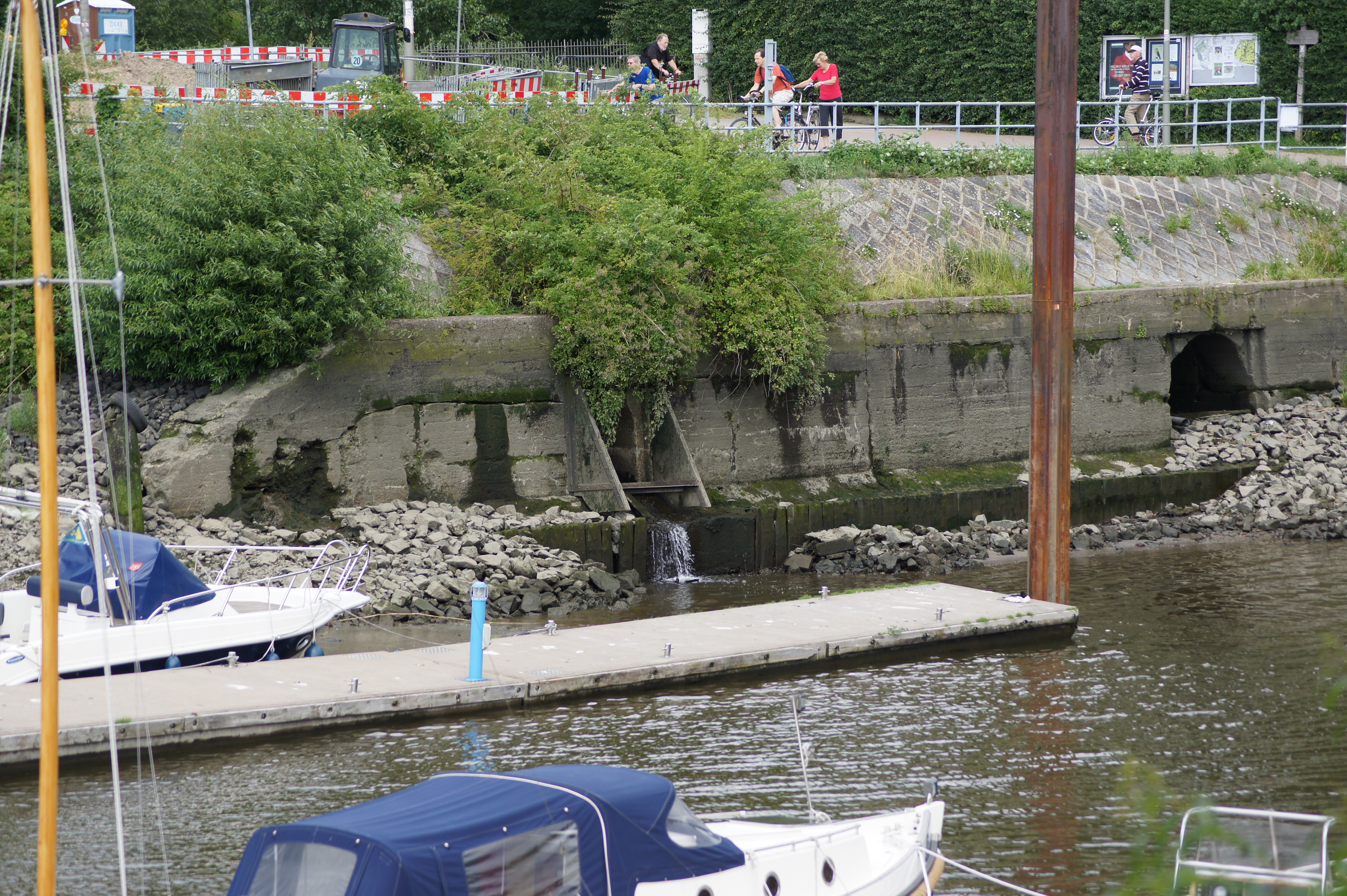
- Confluence of Flottbek and Elbe at the port of Teufelsbrück

Location
- Country: Germany
- City: Hamburg

Physical characteristics
- Mouth
  - location: Elbe
  - coordinates: 53.5477°N 9.8673°E

Basin features
- Progression: Elbe→ North Sea

Flottbek is a small river of Hamburg, Germany. It flows into the Elbe near Hamburg-Othmarschen.

It should not be confused with the Kleine Flottbek, another tributary of the Elbe.

== See also ==
- List of rivers of Hamburg
