= Nienstedten =

- Quarter of Hamburg
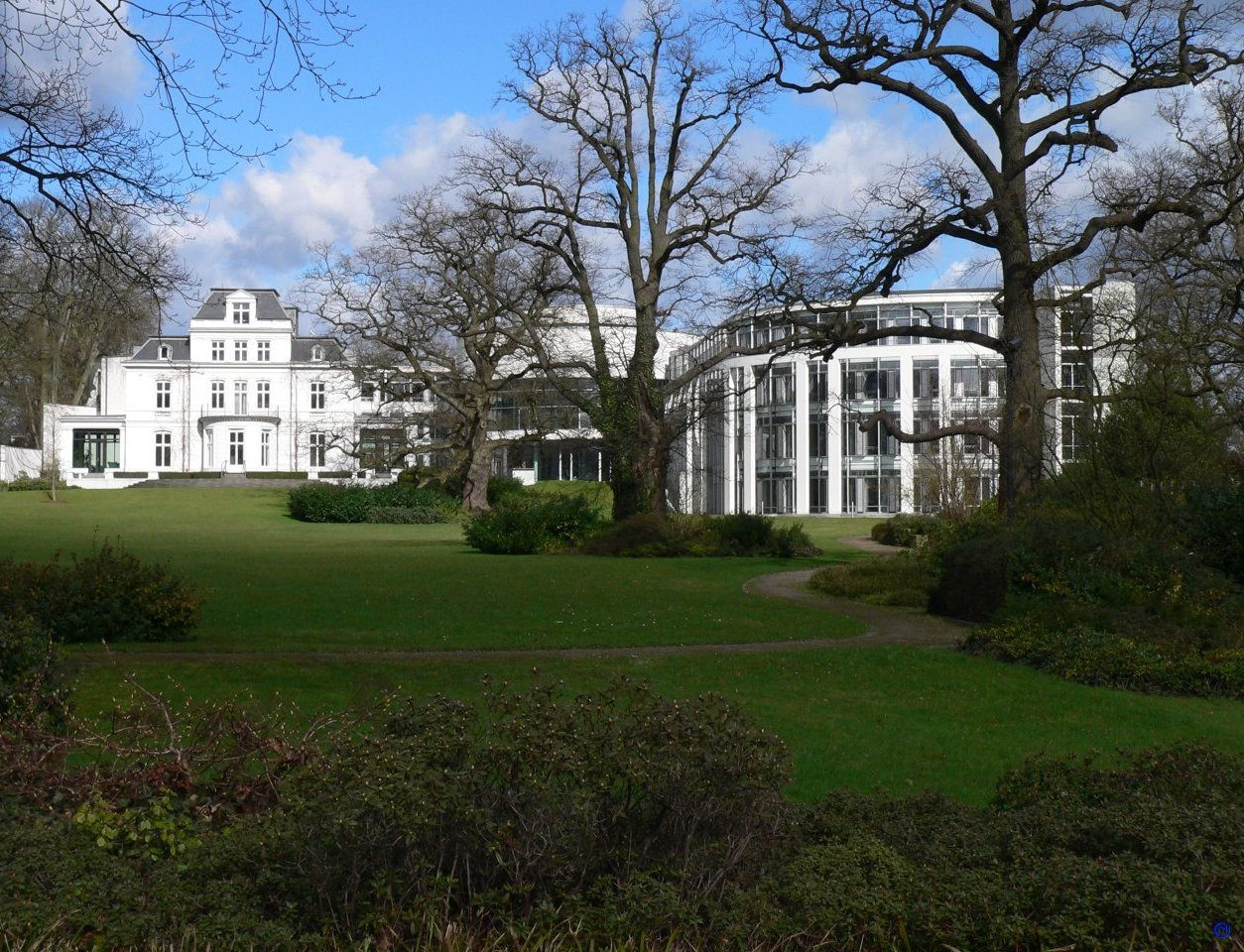
- International Tribunal for the Law of the Sea; View from the river Elbe

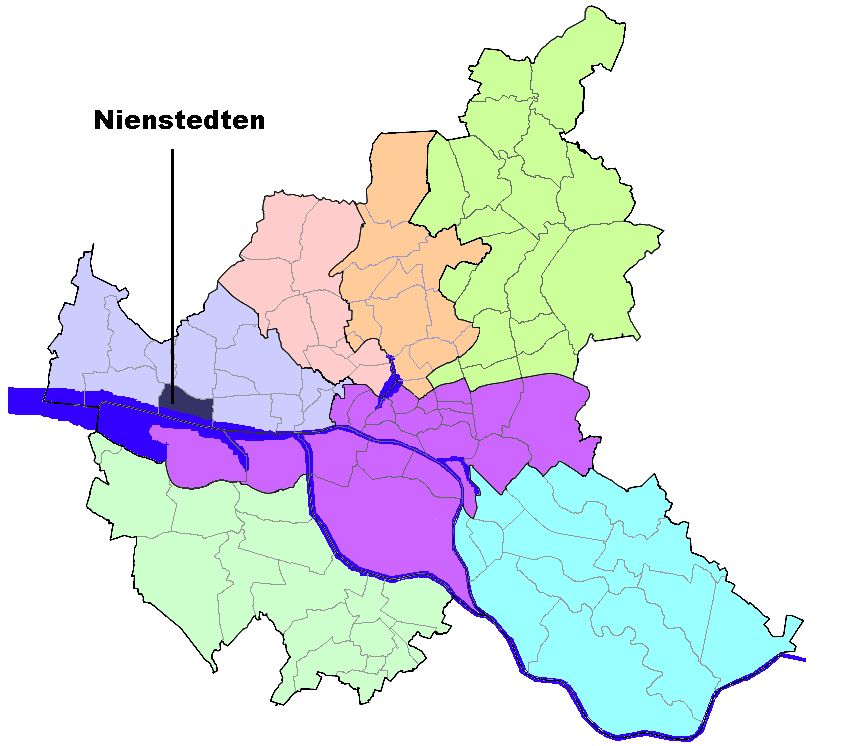
- Location of Nienstedten in the city of Hamburg
- Interactive map of Nienstedten
- Location within Germany Location within Hamburg
- Coordinates: 53°33′18″N 9°50′41″E
- Country: Germany
- State: Hamburg
- City: Hamburg
- Borough: Altona, Hamburg

Area
  - Total: 4.4 km^{2} (1.7 sq mi)

Population (2024-12-31)
  - Total: 7,062
  - Density: 1,600/km^{2} (4,200/sq mi)
- Time zone: UTC+01:00 (CET)
  - Summer (DST): UTC+02:00 (CEST)
- Dialling codes: 040
- Vehicle registration: HH

Nienstedten (German pronunciation: [niːnˈʃtɛtn̩]) is a quarter in the city of Hamburg, Germany. It belongs to the Altona borough on the right bank of the Elbe river. Nienstedten is home to the International Tribunal for the Law of the Sea. In 2020 the population was 7,114.

== Geography ==
In 2006, according to the statistical office of Hamburg and Schleswig-Holstein, Nienstedten had a total area of 4.4 km^{2}. The northern border of Nienstedten to the quarter Osdorf is formed by the railway tracks of the city train. In the west lies the quarter Blankenese. To the south, in the middle of river Elbe, the border to Finkenwerder, a quarter of the Hamburg-Mitte borough, is located. To the east, Nienstedten borders the quarter of Othmarschen, in the north east lies Groß Flottbek.

== Demographics ==
In 2006 Nienstedten has 6,783 inhabitants. The population density was 1,545/km^{2} (4,002/sq mi). 18.7% were children under the age of 18, and 24.4% were 65 years of age or older. 9.8% were resident aliens. 74 people were registered as unemployed and 1,433 were employees subject to social insurance contributions.

In 1999 there were 3,044 households, out of which 21% had children under the age of 18 living with them and 40.6% of all households were made up of individuals. The average household size was 2.12.

=== Population by year ===
The population is counted by the residential registration office for the December 31 each year.

1987	1988	1989	1990	1991	1992	1993	1994	1995	1996	1997	1998	1999
6,471	6,457	6,508	6,539	6,568	6,524	6,422	6,319	6,290	6,316	6,311	6,268	6,304

2000	2001	2002	2003	2004	2005	2006
6,312	6,368	6,434	6,502	6,534	6,707	6,783

In 2006 there were 465 criminal offences (69 crimes per 1000 people).

== Education ==
There were 2 elementary schools and 1 secondary school in the quarter Nienstedten.

A part of the Führungsakademie der Bundeswehr is located in the barracks Clausewitz-Kaserne. The academy of the Bundeswehr educates officers for leading positions.

== Culture ==
=== Recreation ===
The public park Hirschpark is located at the river Elbe, which contains Tennis facilities and a small Wildlife reservoir.

== Infrastructure ==
The International Tribunal for the Law of the Sea (ITLOS) is located in Nienstedten.

The Honorary Consulate of the Republic of Malawi established in Hamburg in 1969 is located at Elbchaussee 419.

=== Transportation ===
Nienstedten is serviced by the rapid transit system of the city train with the stations Hochkamp and Klein Flottbek. The several bus lines and the city trains are coordinated by the Hamburger Verkehrsverbund (Hamburgs public transport coordination company).

According to the Department of Motor Vehicles (Kraftfahrt-Bundesamt), in the quarter Nienstedten were 3,263 private cars registered (487 cars/1000 people). There were 28 traffic accidents total, including 23 traffic accidents with damage to persons.

== Notes ==
=== References ===
- Statistical office Hamburg and Schleswig-Holstein: Regionalergebnisse Der Norden zählt Statistisches Amt für Hamburg und Schleswig-Holstein, official website (in German)
- Hospitals in Hamburg 2006, Government Agency for Social Affairs, Family Affairs, Health and Environment of Hamburg website (in German)
