= Othmarschen =

- Quarter of Hamburg
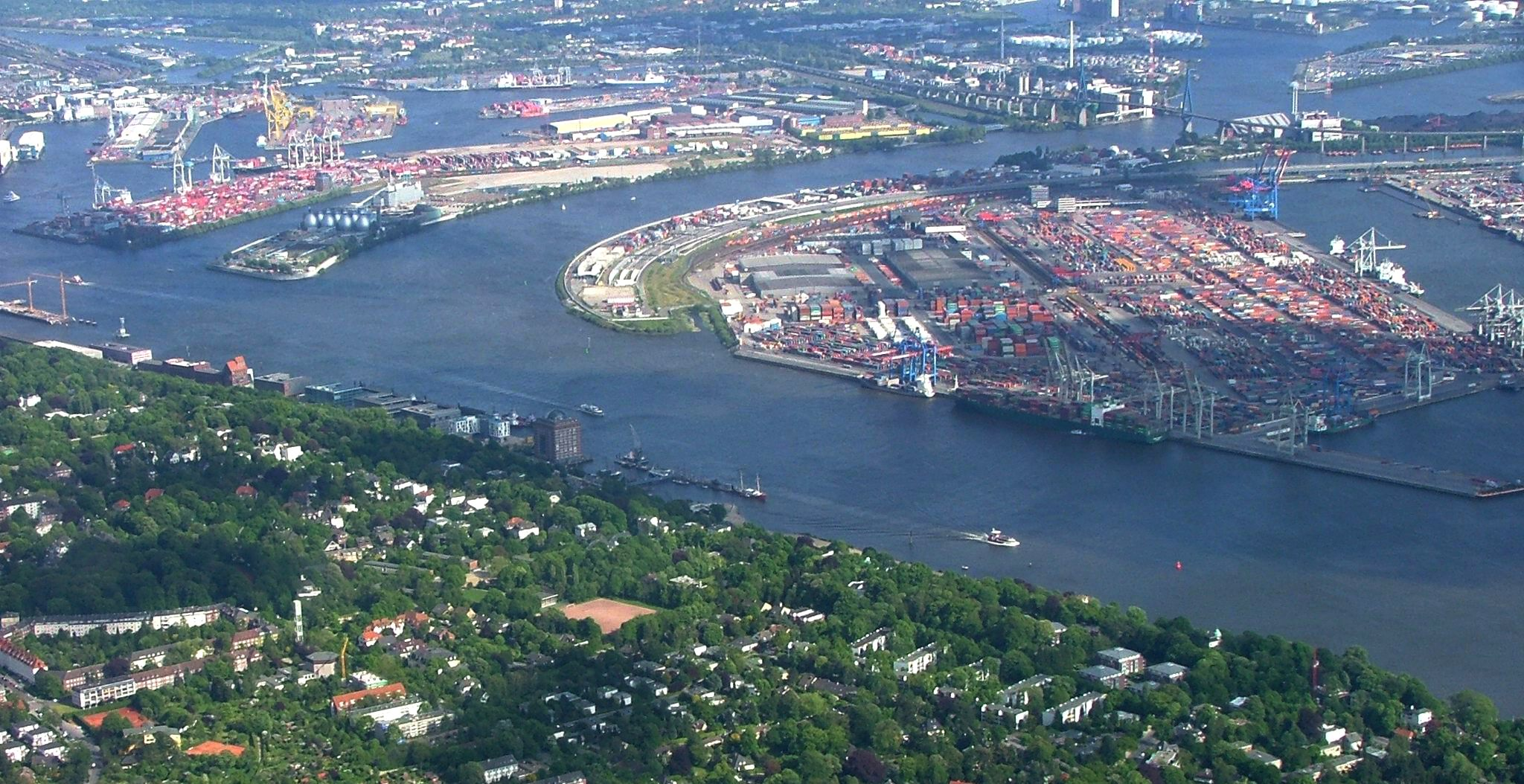
- Port of Hamburg and the quarter Othmarschen (in front). View from north-west.

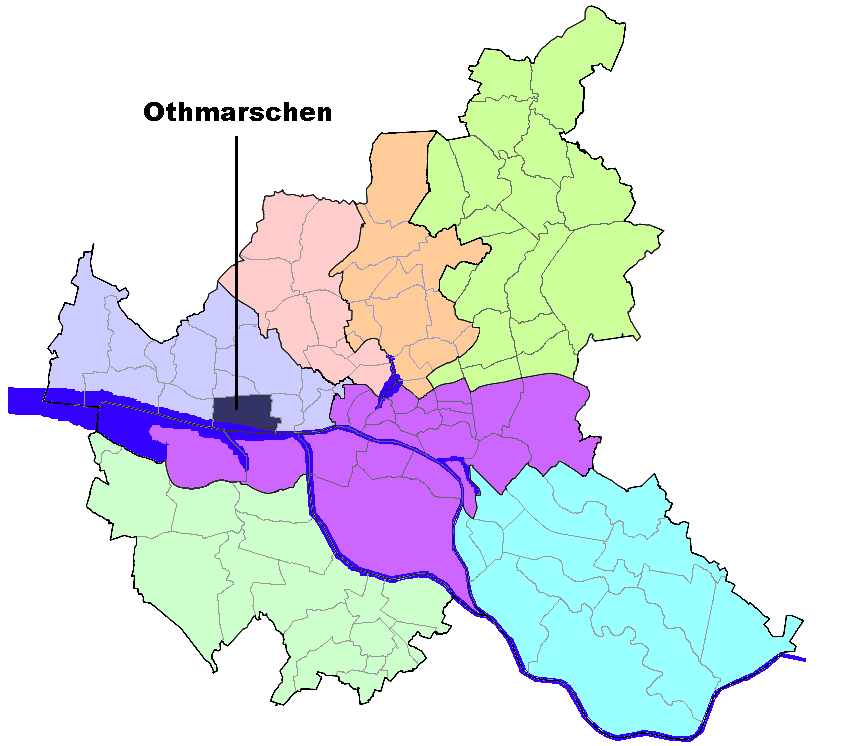
- Location of Othmarschen in Hamburg
- Interactive map of Othmarschen
- Location within Germany Location within Hamburg
- Coordinates: 53°33′10″N 9°53′40″E
- Country: Germany
- State: Hamburg
- City: Hamburg
- Borough: Altona, Hamburg

Area
  - Total: 6.0 km^{2} (2.3 sq mi)

Population (2024-12-31)
  - Total: 16,528
  - Density: 2,800/km^{2} (7,100/sq mi)
- Time zone: UTC+01:00 (CET)
  - Summer (DST): UTC+02:00 (CEST)
- Dialling codes: 040
- Vehicle registration: HH

Othmarschen (German pronunciation: [ˈoːtˌmaːɐ̯ʃn̩]) is a quarter in the Altona borough of Hamburg in northern Germany. In 2020 the population was 16,009.

== History ==
The first records on Othmarschen are from 1317. Together with Altona, Othmarschen became a part of Hamburg in 1937/1938 through the Greater Hamburg Act.

== Geography ==
In 2006 according to the statistical office of Hamburg and Schleswig-Holstein, the quarter Othmarschen has a total area of 6 km^{2}. The western quarter is Nienstedten. In the South the river Elbe is the border to Waltershof. The border in the North to the quarters Groß Flottbek and Bahrenfeld is the railway track of the city train. In the East is the quarter Ottensen.

== Demographics ==
In 2006, the quarter Othmarschen had a population of 12,169 people. The population density was 2,023 people per km^{2}. 16.7% were children under the age of 18, and 22.9% were 65 years of age or older. 11.3% were immigrants. 153 people were registered as unemployed and 2,508 were employees subject to social insurance contributions.

In 1999, there were 5,672 households, out of which 17.8% had children under the age of 18 living with them and 45.8% of all households were made up of individuals. The average household size was 1.98.

In 2006, there were 1,178 criminal offences (97 crimes per 1000 people).

== Education ==
The private International School of Hamburg (ISH) was located in Othmarschen. In 2010, it was moved to Osdorf. (Hemingstedter Weg)

There were one elementary school and three secondary schools (Christianeum Hamburg, Gymnasium Hochrad, Gymnasium Othmarschen) in the quarter Othmarschen.

== Culture ==
=== Museums, galleries ===
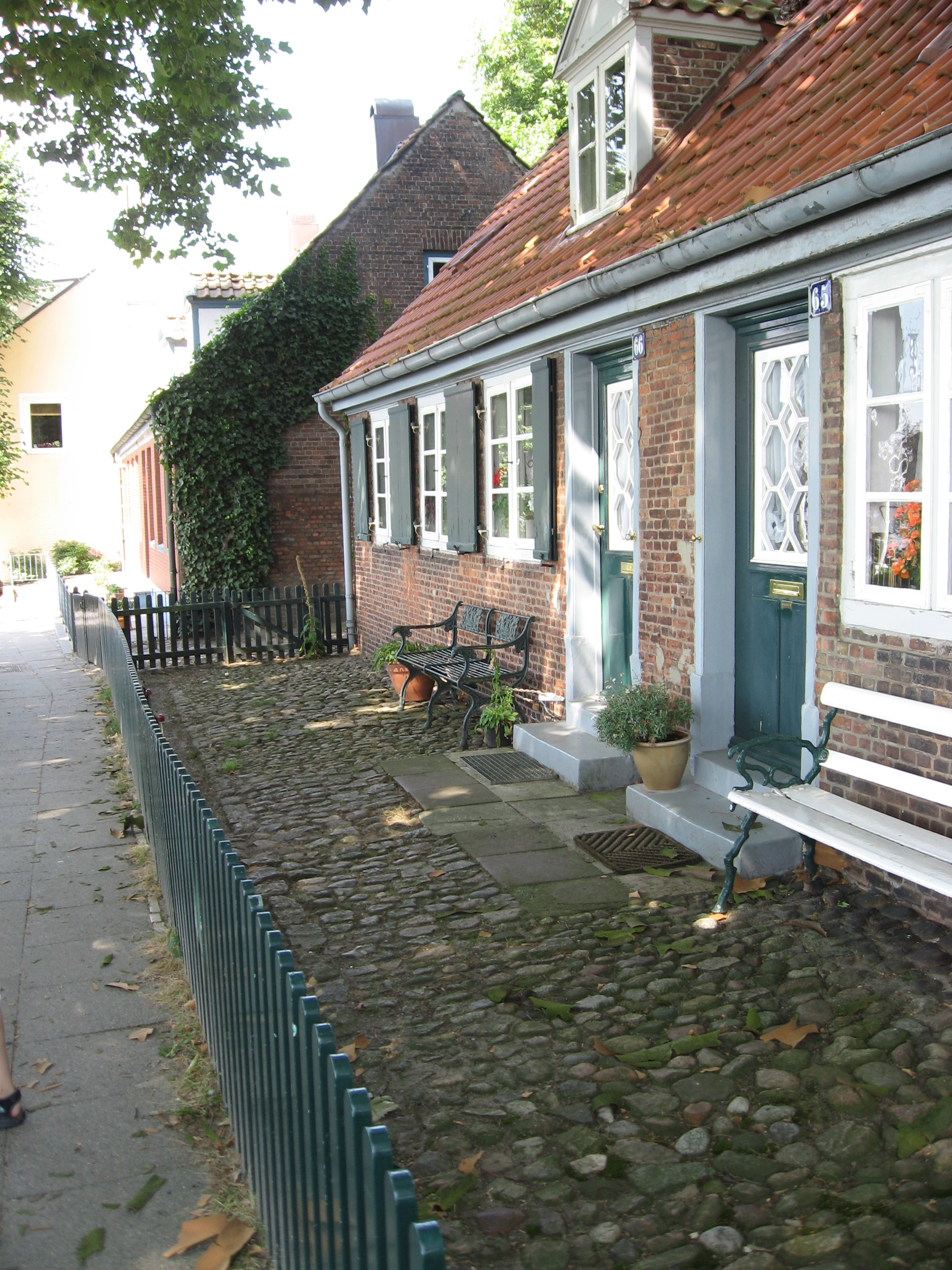
Neighbourhood Övelgönne

The Ernst Barlach Haus is a museum for the work of the expressionist sculptor, printmaker and writer Ernst Barlach. It is located in the Jenisch park.

The museums harbour in the neighbourhood Övelgönne is a small port with some old ships.

The Jenisch Haus was built 1831-1834 by Franz Gustav Forsmann in cooperation with Karl Friedrich Schinkel in the Jenisch park as a recreation home for Martin Johann Jenisch, a minister of Hamburg. Today it is a branch of the Altonaer Museum in Ottensen. It exhibits mainly paintings and other art from the first half of the 19th century.

=== Recreation ===
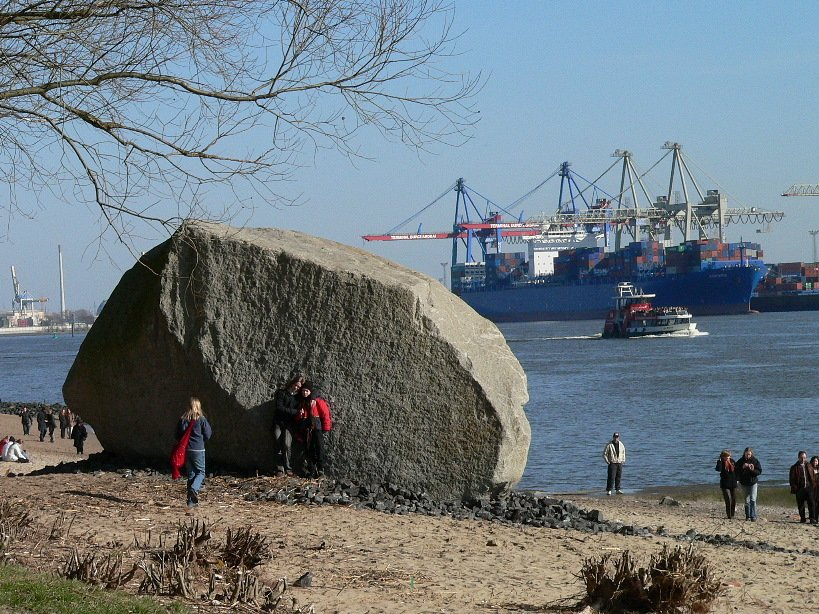
Glazier erratic "Alter Schwede". Found in the river Elbe now at the beach in Othmarschen

In Othmarschen is the Jenisch park and the Hindenburgpark and the Schröders Elbpark directly to the beach of the river Elbe.

== Infrastructure ==
The Consulate General of the People's Republic of China established in Hamburg in 1921 is located at Elbchaussee 268.

=== Health systems ===
The Asklepios Klinik Altona is a general hospital with 922 beds located Paul-Ehrlich-Strasse. The hospital has 13 departments, including internal medicine, surgery, gynaecology/maternity clinic, urology, neurology, neurosurgery, ophthalmology, anaesthetics and intensive care and ambulant surgery.

In Othmarschen were 10 day-care centers for children and also 27 physicians in private practice and 1 pharmacy.

=== Transportation ===
Public transport in Othmarschen is provided by the rapid transit system of the city train with the stations Othmarschen and Bahrenfeld and several bus lines. This is coordinated through the Hamburger Verkehrsverbund.

An exit of the Bundesautobahn 7 and the northern tunnel entrance of the Elbe tunnel is located in Othmarschen.

According to the Department of Motor Vehicles (Kraftfahrt-Bundesamt), in the quarter were 5,475 private cars registered (464 cars/1000 people). There were 92 traffic accidents total, including 76 traffic accidents with damage to persons.

== Notes ==
=== References ===
- Statistical office Hamburg and Schleswig-Holstein Statistisches Amt für Hamburg und Schleswig-Holstein, official website (in German)
- Hospitals in Hamburg 2006, Government Agency for Social Affairs, Family Affairs, Health and Environment of Hamburg website (in German)
