= Hoheneichen station =

Railway station in Hamburg, Germany

Coordinates: 53.6356°N 10.0681°E

Hoheneichen
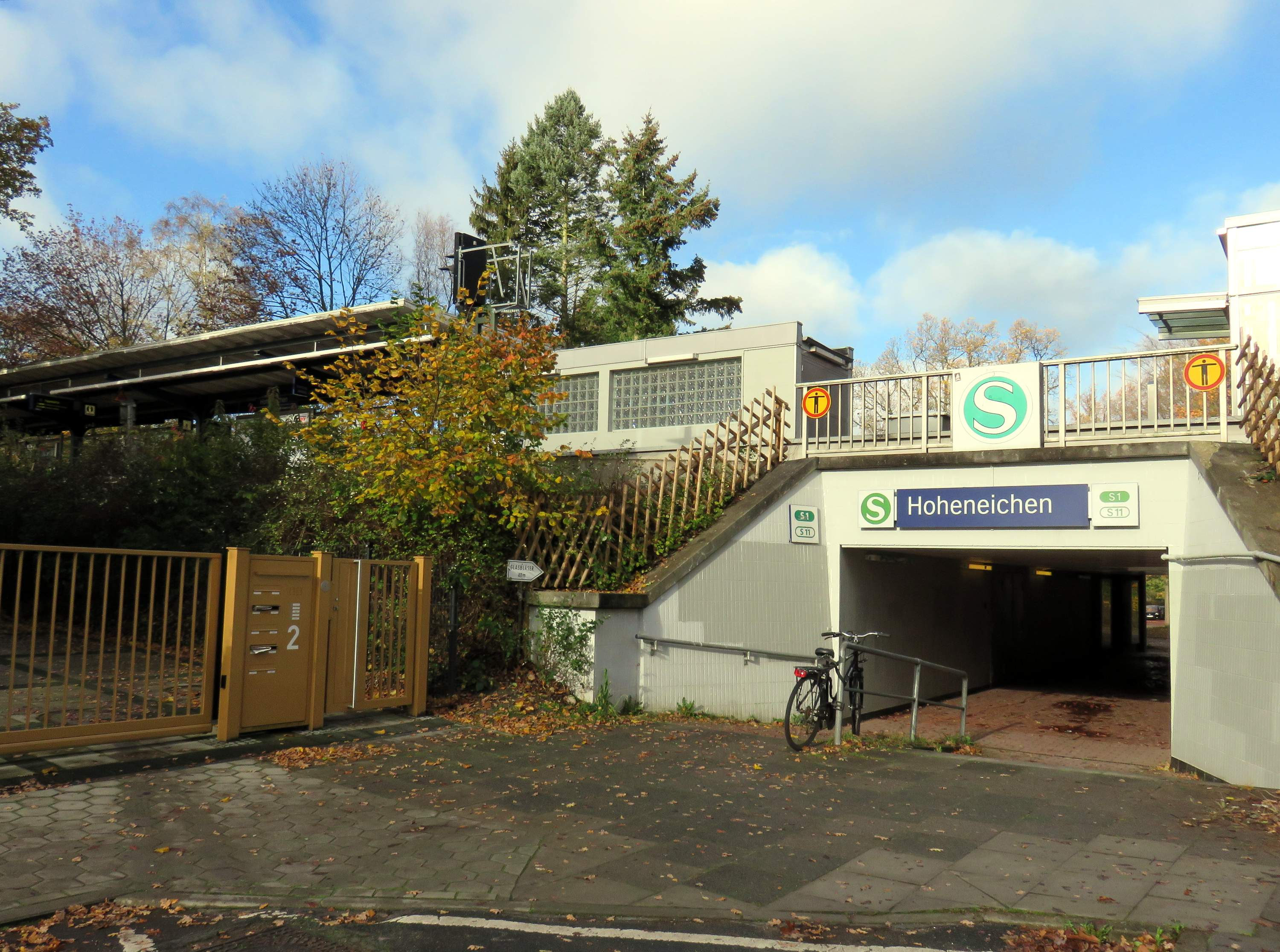
- Entrance of Hoheneichen station (2015)

General information
- Location: Langwisch 15; 22391 Hamburg, Germany
- Operator: S-Bahn Hamburg GmbH
- Line: S1
- Platforms: 1 island platform
- Tracks: 2

Construction
- Structure type: Elevated

Other information
- Station code: ds100: AHCH; DB: 2843
- Fare zone: HVV: A/204

History
- Opened: 15 January 1918; 108 years ago
- Electrified: 12 March 1924; 102 years ago, 6.3 kV AC system (overhead; turned off in 1955); 22 April 1940; 86 years ago, 1.2 kV DC system (3rd rail)

Services
| Preceding station | Hamburg S-Bahn | Following station |
|---|---|---|
| Kornweg towards Wedel | S1 | Wellingsbüttel towards Poppenbüttel |
Location
- Location within Hamburg Location within Schleswig-Holstein Location within Germany Location within Europe

Hoheneichen is a station on the Alster Valley line, located in Wellingsbüttel, Hamburg, Germany. It is served by the trains of Hamburg S-Bahn line S1. The station was opened in 1918.

== History ==
The station was opened in 1918, and electrified in 1924.

== Station layout ==
Hoheneichen is an elevated station with an island platform and 2 tracks. The station is unstaffed but an SOS and information telephone is available. There are some places to lock a bicycle as well as some parking spots. The station is fully accessible for handicapped persons, as there is a lift. There are no lockers.

== Service ==
The line S1 of Hamburg S-Bahn call at Hoheneichen station.

== See also ==
- Hamburger Verkehrsverbund (HVV)
- List of Hamburg S-Bahn stations
