= Kornweg station =

Railway station in Hamburg, Germany

Kornweg (Klein Borstel)
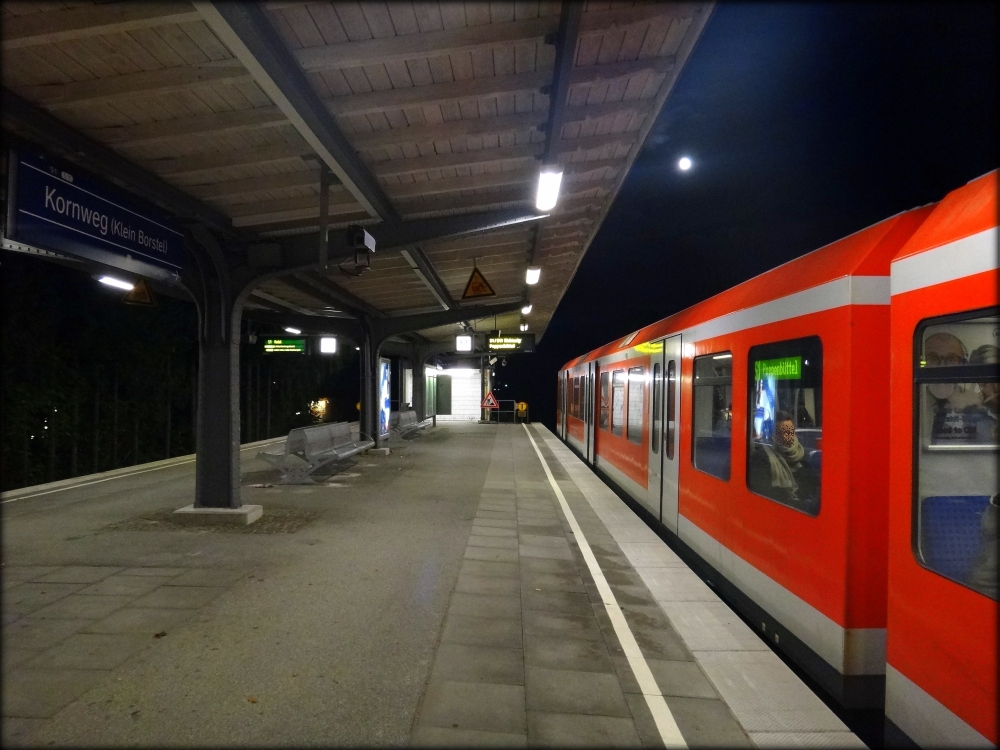

General information
- Other names: Hamburg Kornweg
- Location: Tornberg 33; 22337 Hamburg; Germany
- Coordinates: 53°37′57″N 10°03′16″E
- Operator: S-Bahn Hamburg GmbH
- Line: S1
- Platforms: 1 island platform
- Tracks: 2

Construction
- Structure type: Elevated

Other information
- Station code: ds100: AKWS; DB: 3378
- Fare zone: HVV: A/204

History
- Opened: 15 January 1918; 108 years ago
- Electrified: 12 March 1924; 102 years ago, 6.3 kV AC system (overhead; turned off in 1955); 22 April 1940; 86 years ago, 1.2 kV DC system (3rd rail)
- Former names: 1918-1931 Kornweg; 1931-1938 Kornweg (Klein Borstel)

Services
Preceding station	Hamburg S-Bahn	Following station
Ohlsdorf towards Wedel	S1	Hoheneichen towards Poppenbüttel
Location
- Location within Hamburg Location within Schleswig-Holstein Location within Germany Location within Europe

Kornweg is a station on the Alster Valley line, located in Ohlsdorf, Hamburg, Germany. It is served by the trains of Hamburg S-Bahn line S1. The station was opened in 1918.

== History ==
The station was opened in 1918, and electrified in 1924.

== Service ==
The line S1 of Hamburg S-Bahn call at Kornweg station.

== Gallery ==
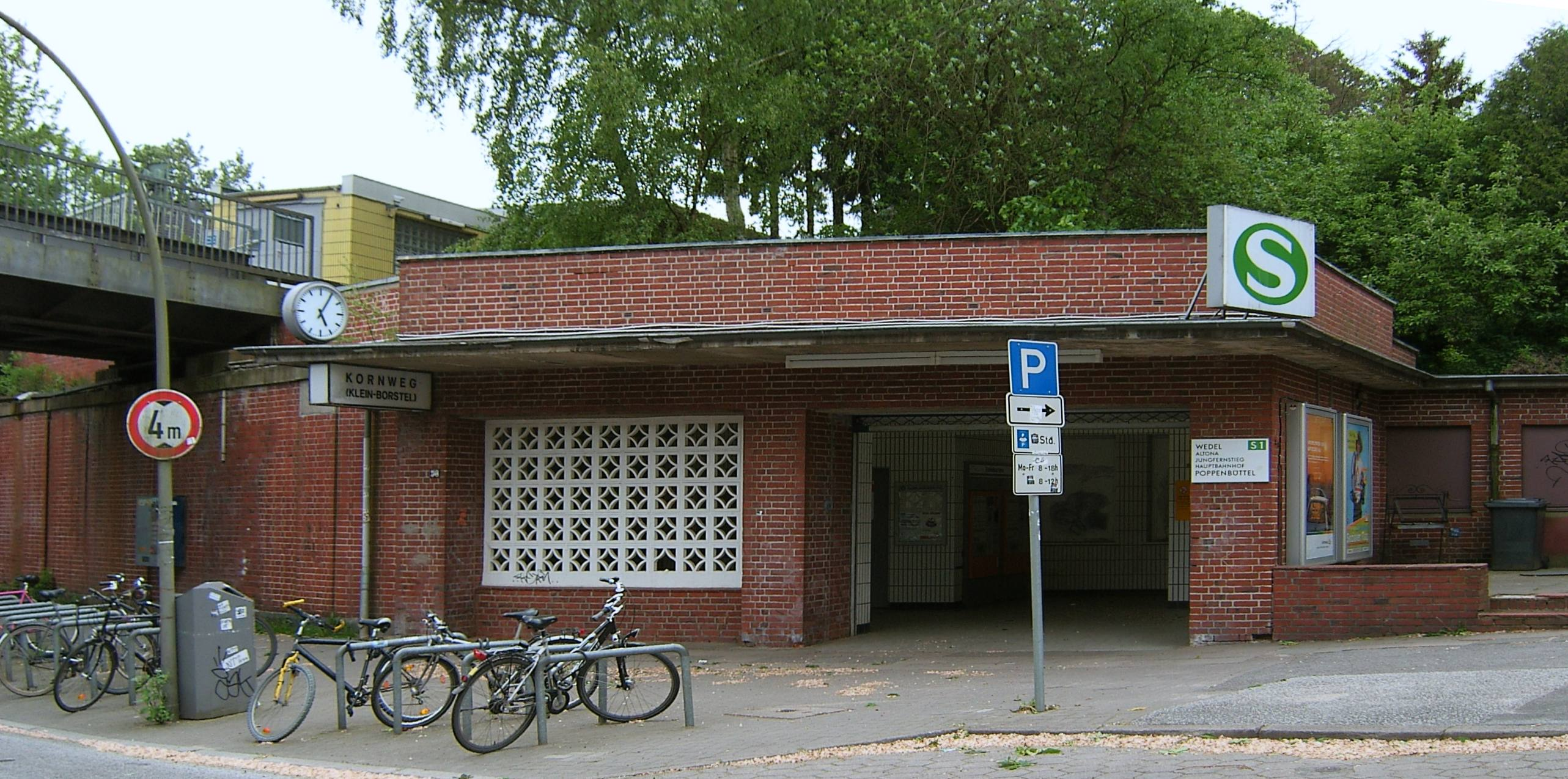
The station's entrance

== See also ==
- Hamburger Verkehrsverbund (HVV)
- List of Hamburg S-Bahn stations
