= Wellingsbüttel station =

Railway station in Hamburg, Germany

Coordinates: 53.6411°N 10.0825°E

Wellingsbüttel
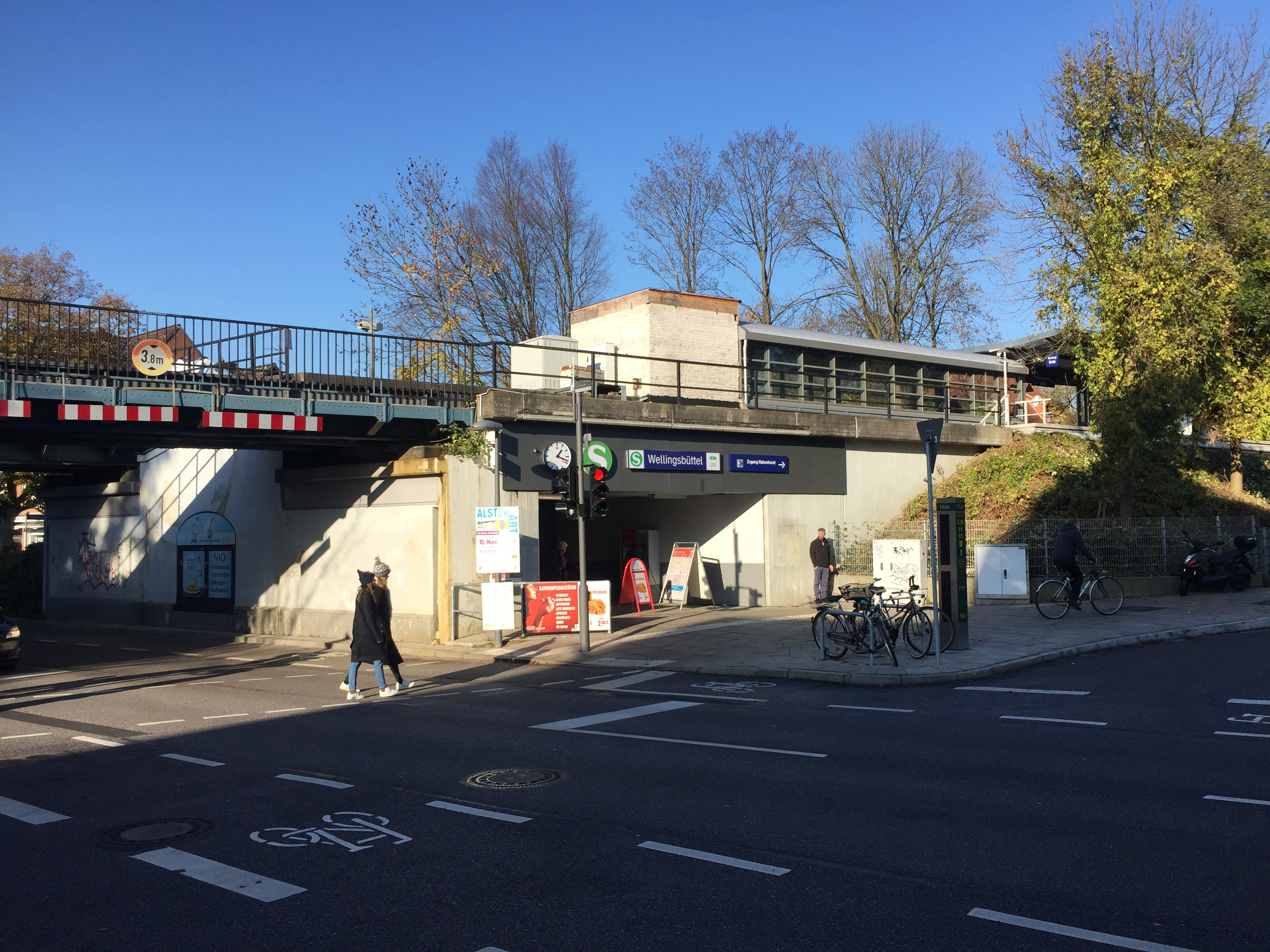
- Entrance of Wellingsbüttel station (2019)

General information
- Location: Rolfinckstrasse 5; 22391 Hamburg, Germany; Germany
- Operator: S-Bahn Hamburg GmbH
- Line: S1
- Platforms: 1 island platform
- Tracks: 2
- Bus stands: 1
- Connections: Bus

Construction
- Structure type: Elevated
- Accessible: Yes

Other information
- Station code: ds100: AWBS; DB: 6657
- Fare zone: HVV: A and B/204 and 304

History
- Opened: 15 January 1918; 108 years ago
- Opening: 1918
- Electrified: 12 March 1924; 102 years ago, 6.3 kV AC system (overhead; turned off in 1955); 22 April 1940; 86 years ago, 1.2 kV DC system (3rd rail)

Services
Preceding station	Hamburg S-Bahn	Following station
Hoheneichen towards Wedel	S1	Poppenbüttel Terminus
Location

Wellingsbüttel is a station on the Alster Valley line, located in Wellingsbüttel, Hamburg, Germany. It is served by the trains of Hamburg S-Bahn line S1. The station was opened in 1918.

== History ==
The station was opened in 1918, and electrified in 1924.

== Station layout ==
Wellingsbüttel is an elevated station with an island platform and 2 tracks. The station is unstaffed but an SOS and information telephone is available. There are some places to lock a bicycle. The station is accessible for handicapped persons. A small shop is located at the station, as well as a taxi stand. There are no lockers.

== Service ==
The line S1 of Hamburg S-Bahn call at Wellingsbüttel station. There is a bus stop in front of the station served by metro bus line 27 and bus lines 168, and 368.

== See also ==
- Hamburger Verkehrsverbund (HVV)
- List of Hamburg S-Bahn stations
