= Rübenkamp station =

Railway station in Hamburg, Germany

Rübenkamp
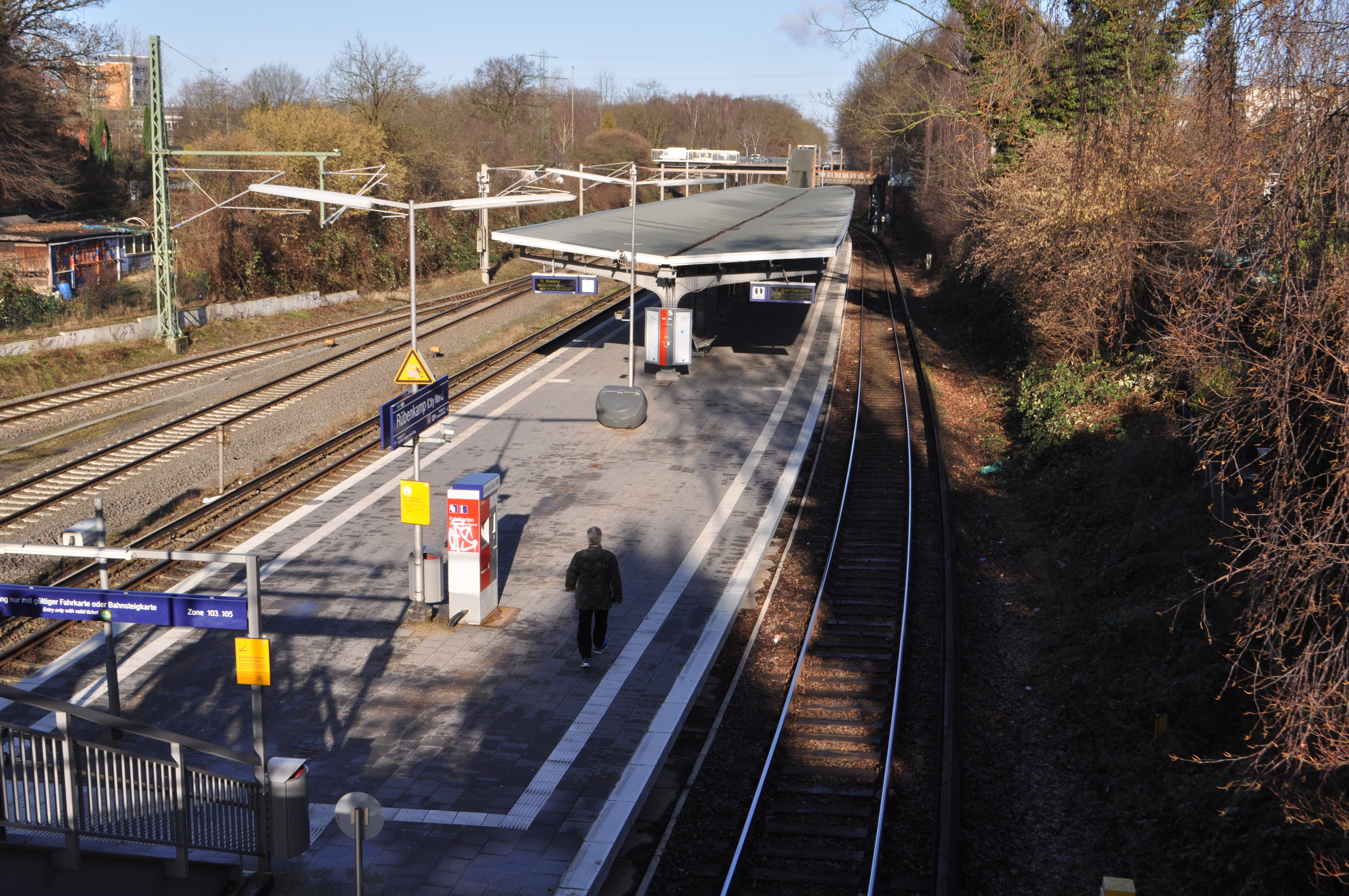

General information
- Location: Rübenkamp 227; 22307 Hamburg, Germany
- Coordinates: 53°36′23″N 10°01′59″E
- Operator: S-Bahn Hamburg GmbH
- Line: S1
- Platforms: 1 island platform
- Tracks: 2
- Connections: Bus

Construction
- Structure type: At grade

Other information
- Station code: ds100: ARP; DB: 5408
- Fare zone: HVV: A/103 and 105

History
- Opened: 1 October 1913; 112 years ago
- Electrified: 1 October 1913; 112 years ago, 6.3 kV AC system (overhead; turned off in 1955); 10 April 1941; 85 years ago, 1.2 kV DC system (3rd rail)

Services
Preceding station	Hamburg S-Bahn	Following station
Alte Wöhr towards Wedel	S1	Ohlsdorf towards Poppenbüttel or Hamburg Airport
Location
- Location within Hamburg Location within Schleswig-Holstein Location within Germany Location within Europe

Rübenkamp is a station on the Hamburg-Altona link line and served by the trains of Hamburg S-Bahn line S1. The station is also known as Rübenkamp (City Nord), due to its proximity to City Nord. It was opened in 1913 and is located in the Hamburg district of Barmbek-Nord, Germany. Barmbek-Nord is part of the borough of Hamburg-Nord.

== History ==
The station was opened in 1913. The station building from this time is listed as a cultural heritage since 15 June 1986.

== Service ==
The line S1 of Hamburg S-Bahn call at Rübenkamp station.

== Gallery ==
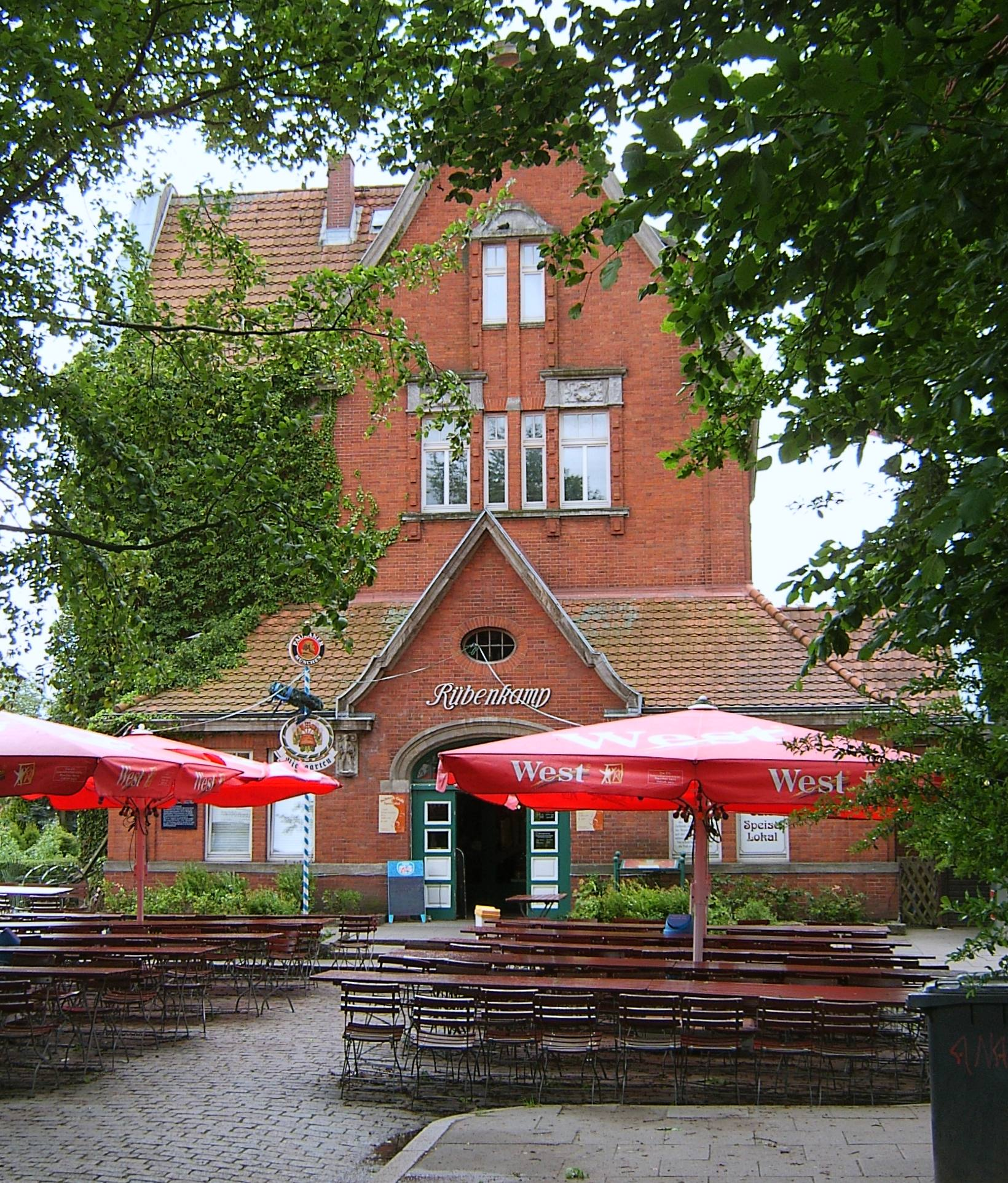
The station's former entrance, today houses a restaurant

== See also ==
- Hamburger Verkehrsverbund (HVV)
- List of Hamburg S-Bahn stations
