= Hamburg-Altona link line =

Railway line in Hamburg, Germany

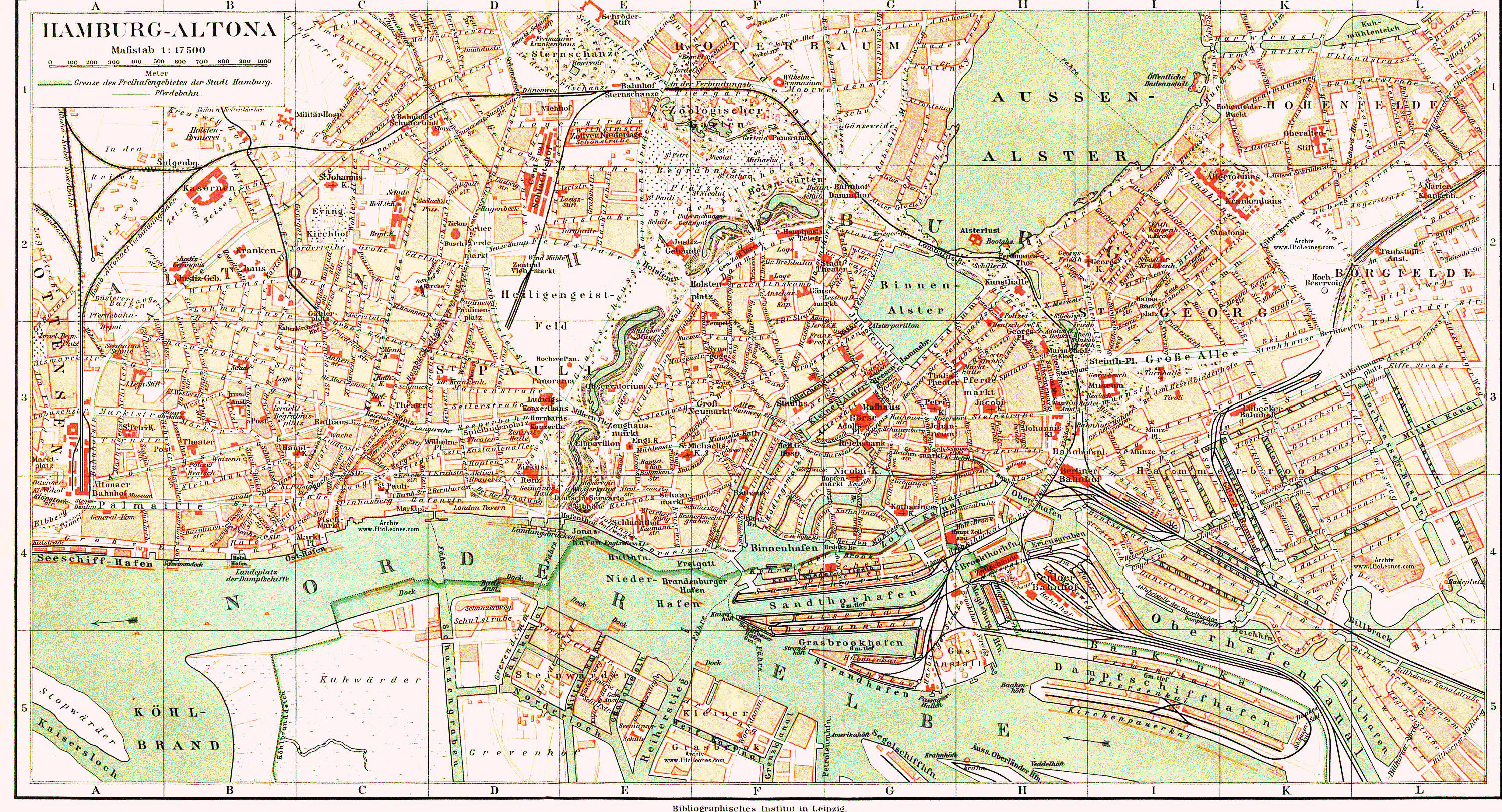

Overview
- Native name: Hamburg-Altonaer Verbindungsbahn
- Line number: 6100 (long-distance); 1240, 1241 (S-Bahn)
- Locale: Hamburg, Germany

Service
- Route number: 137.1 (long-distance); 101.11, 101.21, 101.31 (S-Bahn)

Technical
- Electrification: 15 kV/16.7 Hz AC catenary (long-distance); 1,200 V DC third rail (S-Bahn)

The Hamburg-Altona link line (German: Hamburg-Altonaer Verbindungsbahn) is a railway line in Hamburg, Germany. Nowadays, it connects the lines from the north and northwest of Hamburg and Altona station with Hamburg Hauptbahnhof and the lines to the southwest, south and east. Initially designed as a freight line only, it is now one of the busiest lines in Germany. It includes the suburban tracks of the Hamburg Stadtbahn, originally the core of the Hamburg S-Bahn.

== History ==
Old Hamburg stations, new Hauptbahnhof and links

=== The first railway connection ===
In 1842 the Hamburg-Bergedorf Railway Company opened a 16.5 km line from Hamburg to Bergedorf. In 1846 this line was extended to Berlin. Two years later, the Altona-Kiel Railway Company opened a line to Kiel. There was originally no link between Altona and Hamburg, so freight moving from one line to the other had to be reloaded several times, which was time-consuming and expensive. A two-track link line was therefore built between the stations.

The route of the line is affected strongly in the Hamburg area by the city's former walls. A pile bridge was originally constructed for crossing the Alster river, which was replaced in 1868 by a new bridge, the Lombardsbrücke. The railway was opened in two sections:

- 30 September 1865: Altona–Schulterblatt
- 16 July 1866: Schulterblatt–Klosterthor

South of Klosterthor Station, there were provisional communication rail tracks in the streets to Berlin Station and from 1872 to Venlo Station.

30 years later, the line had already reached its limit and extra capacity had to be added.

=== Adding capacity and extension of the line ===
On 30 December 1898, Prussia, the city of Hamburg and the Lübeck-Büchen Railway Company agreed to the following elements of the link line:

- construction of a new central train station to replace the former terminal stations of the lines to Lübeck, Berlin and Hanover as well as the Klostertor station and link the converging routes,
- elevation of the line to eliminate all level crossings, including the construction of a separate northern pair of lines for suburban trains and
- extension of the connection line to Hasselbrook. This only applied to the suburban line, as the Lübeck–Hamburg line already existed for long-distance traffic.

The widening of the Lombardsbrücke was completed in 1901 and 1902, including the addition of the suburban line. Even as this construction work was underway a new agreement was signed on 12 December 1904 known as the Ohlsdorfer Vertrag (Ohlsdorf contract) providing for:

- extension of the railway under construction via Barmbek to Ohlsdorf, with freight stations being built at the two stations, and
- electrification of the entire Stadtbahn (City railway) between Blankenese, Altona, Hauptbahnhof (central station) and Ohlsdorf.

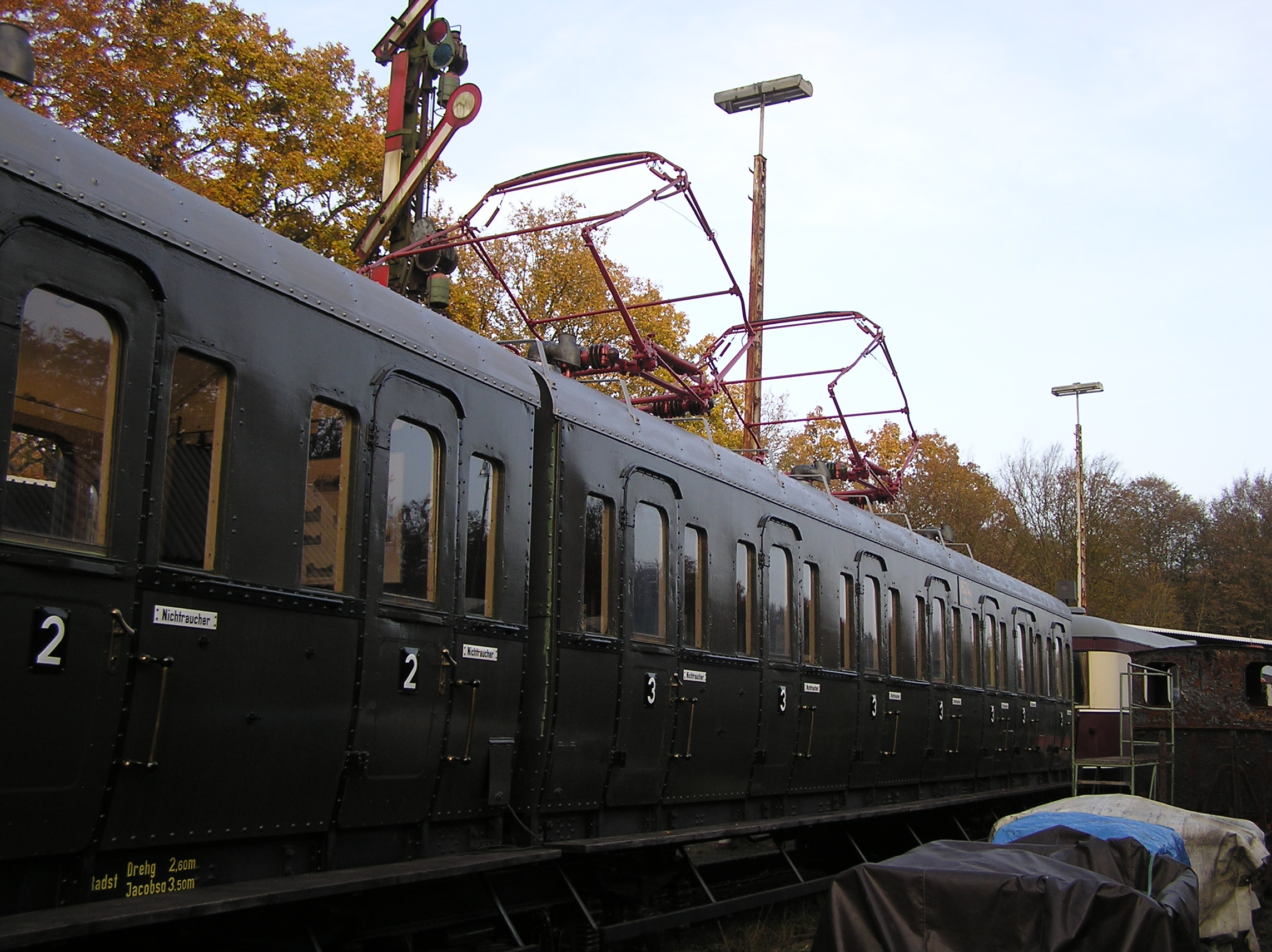
Old S-Bahn train set for overhead electrification on the 6.3 kV 25 Hz AC system

Electrification was decided on by the Prussian State Railways as track operator, after it had already carried out extensive tests on the Schöneweide–Spindlersfeld line in Berlin, using overhead lines with 6.3 kV 25 Hz AC, the system which it selected for Hamburg.

In late 1906 work was completed. The urban and suburban line to Ohlsdorf was put into operation on 5 December 1906; one day later the new Hamburg Hauptbahnhof was commissioned. About a year later operations with electric trains started on the Stadtbahn and all suburban railways, making the Hamburg network the first electrified suburban rail network in Germany.

=== Conversion to DC and expansion of the S-Bahn ===
AC operations continued until the late 1930s with few service problems. However, in the meantime electric operations had been established on the Berlin S-Bahn using direct current. Since the technology in use in Hamburg had to be replaced anyway it was decided to switch to using third rail DC current. Even before this decision was made the Stadtbahn and suburban railways were designated as the S-Bahn in 1934, four years after the Berlin network was so named.

Unlike the 800 volt power used in Berlin, the voltage chosen in Hamburg was 1200 volts, which was technically, the maximum voltage that could be used in rail operations. Similarly, it was decided to use bottom contact third rail, which had a clear advantage at points, as the third-rail power would not have to be interrupted. In 1940 transition to the new system began, but, due to the war, conversion could not be completed until 1955.

From the 1960s, there was continuous expansion of the suburban rail network. Although the link line as the core of the S-Bahn had good passenger traffic, it only touches the city centre at its northern edge. Thus, a new central underground line (subsequently known as the City S-Bahn) was planned through the central area, which had more than 300,000 jobs. This required some alterations for the old main line, to allow the connection of the new underground line to the main line at the Hauptbahnhof and its reconnection to Altona station from the south. The entire Altona station building was demolished and subsequently rebuilt in a plain 1970s style. The reason for the new station building was the danger that the old station building would collapse during the construction of the tunnel. The underground S-Bahn station was built with four tracks, which allows trains to be reversed.

Since the construction of the City-S-Bahn, S-Bahn services between the Hauptbahnhof and Altona is split: lines S1, S2 and S3 now run through the tunnel and lines S11, S21 and S31 run on the old main line.

== Stations ==
- The original Altona station was built at the southern end of the Hamburg-Altona–Kiel line. Between 1893 and 1898 it was replaced with a new building 400 metres further north, as extending the old station was impossible due to the dense development. The former station was expanded with a new north wing, to become the new Altona Town Hall.
- The new Altona station (until 1938 known as Altona Hauptbahnhof) was opened in 1898. It initially had eight tracks, but after the construction of the suburban station it had ten tracks. The station building was originally built in Gothic Revival style; in 1979 it was rebuilt in a plain style, which was renovated in 2002.
- Holstenstraße station was opened in 1893 as a replacement for the former Schulterblatt station during the elevating of the line. It originally had platforms for both long-distance and suburban services, with a hall on each platform and a reception building. These were destroyed during World War II; only the S-Bahn building was rebuilt and this was replaced in 1990. The remains of the long-distance platform was demolished in 1970.
- Schulterblatt station was right on the border between the former cities of Hamburg and Altona. In 1893 was the station was closed and replaced by Holstenstraße station.
- Sternschanze station has been located at the present site since 1906 and is an S-Bahn only station now. The entrance building to the once magnificent station hall still exists. A station with the same name already existed from the opening of the line in 1866, the new one was created during the elevation of the line but further west. The former station building still exists north of the line.
- Dammtor station is the smallest long-distance station in Hamburg. In the mid-1980s, the station was beautifully restored building and is a heritage-listed building.
- Hamburg Hauptbahnhof was built in 1906 to the east of the city as a replacement for the three terminal stations on the lines to Lübeck, Berlin and Hanover. It is the largest self-supporting station hall in Europe with a span of 73 m and it is the busiest station in Germany. In 1983 an underground platform was built immediately adjacent to the Hauptbahnhof for the S-Bahn to improve passenger transfers.

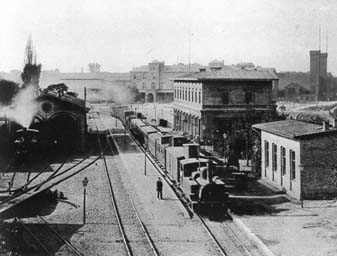
Klosterthor station with the Berliner station in the background

- Klosterthor station was until the completion of the new Hauptbahnhof the terminus of the link line. It was connected by a curve to the line to Berlin. Later, another connection was built to the Hannöverscher Bahnhof and to the Hamburg port railway.

Klosterthor station is at the end the actual link line. From 1902 to 1906, the Stadtbahn was extended parallel with the Lübeck–Hamburg line to Hasselbrook where it turns toward Ohlsdorf.

- Lippeltstraße station operated between 1903 and 1906, during the reconstruction of the link line as a temporary terminus for the Berlin line, but only for trains from Bergedorf and Büchen. The long-distance trains from Berlin still ran over the old line to Klosterthor station, but this was also stopped in 1906.
- Berliner Tor station was built with the extension to Ohlsdorf in 1906. It is now one of the largest interchange on the Hamburg network, since a line branches off the Stadtbahn at the station to run parallel with the main line to Berlin and two U-Bahn lines also run through the station. The S-Bahn station is located on two levels, the lower one serves trains to and from Hasselbrook and the upper level serves trains to Bergedorf.
- Landwehr station was opened as part of the extension to Ohlsdorf in 1906. It had a reception hall in the neo-baroque style, but this was damaged during World War II and only partially rebuilt. In the 1970s the building was demolished.
- Hasselbrook station, opened in 1907, is the junction station between the Stadtbahn and the Vogelfluglinie. In addition to the S-Bahn station, it has a platform for regional services.
- Wandsbeker Chaussee station was opened in 1906 and is located on the street of the same name. It has connected with U-Bahn line U1 since its extension in 1962.
- Friedrichsberg station is located in the Dulsberg district and was also opened in 1906.
- Barmbek station is transfer point between the U-Bahn lines U2 and U3 and the S-Bahn S1 and S11. The suburban station was opened as part of the whole route between the Hauptbahnhof and Ohlsdorf on 5 December 1906. The U-Bahn station was opened on 15 February 1912. In 1918 the station expanded to its current six platform tracks during the construction of the Walddörfer (forest villages) Railway, now part of U-Bahn line U2.
- Alte Wöhr station was opened in 1931 under the name of Stadtpark. It was renamed in the early 1970s to avoid confusion with the nearby U-Bahn station then also called Stadtpark, but now called Saarlandstraße.
- Rübenkamp station was opened in 1913 to serve the new hospital in Barmbek and later the residential area of Barmbek-Nord.
- Ohlsdorf station was the terminus of the Stadtbahn when it opened in 1906. Since 1914 it has been possible to interchange between the S-Bahn and the U-Bahn (now line U1). In 1918, the Alster Valley Railway opened from Ohlsdorf to Poppenbüttel. In 1924 it was incorporated into the Hamburg suburban railways. In 1940, the Ohlsdorf–Poppenbüttel section became the first line of the Hamburg S-Bahn to be electrified with direct current. Just south of the station is the Hamburg-Ohlsdorf depot where all Hamburg S-Bahn trains are stored and maintained.

On 11 December 2008, the underground S-Bahn line opened from Ohlsdorf to Hamburg Airport.

== Operations ==
S-Bahn lines S11 (Blankenese–Ohlsdorf), S21 (Elbgaustraße–Aumühle) and S31 (Altona–Neugraben) run on the two northern tracks of the link line (the Stadtbahn). The two southern tracks are used by long-distance and regional trains. Many trains to or from the south serve not only the Hauptbahnhof, but also Altona station. The original purpose of the link line, the handling of freight traffic, is now served by the Hamburg freight bypass, running through the northern suburbs.
