= Ohlsdorf station =

Railway station in Hamburg, Germany

Ohlsdorf
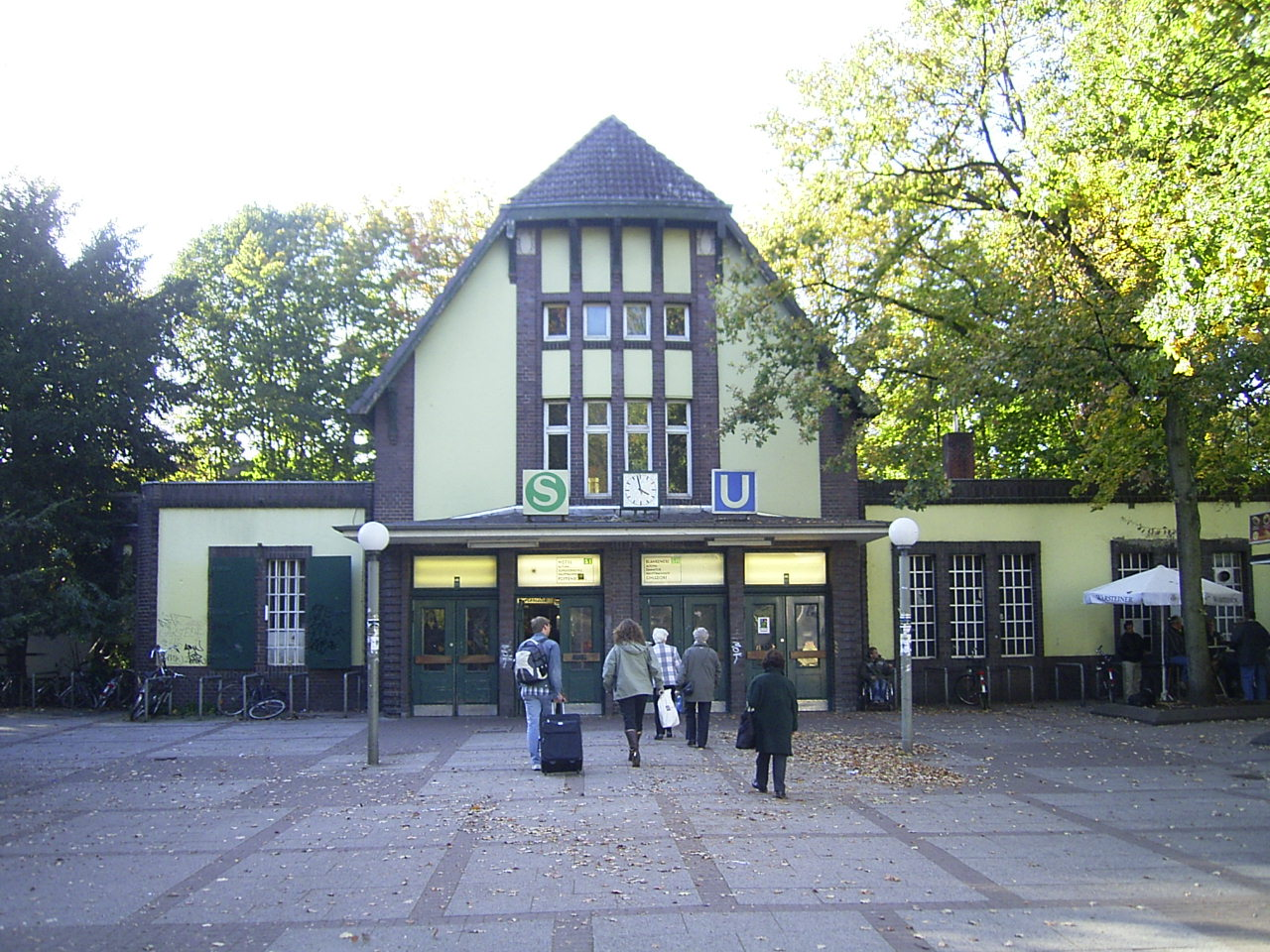
- Station building by Henry Grell

General information
- Location: Fühlsbütteler Straße 761; 22335 Hamburg, Germany
- Coordinates: 53°37′13″N 10°1′53″E
- Lines: S1 U1
- Platforms: 2 island platforms
- Tracks: 4
- Connections: Bus, Taxi

Construction
- Structure type: Elevated
- Parking: Park and Ride (252 slots)
- Accessible: Yes

Other information
- Station code: ds100: AOPS; DB station code:4751
- Fare zone: HVV: A/103, 105, 203, and 204

History
- Opened: 5 December 1906; 119 years ago 1 November 1914; 111 years ago
- Electrified: 29 January 1908; 118 years ago, 6.3 kV AC system (overhead; turned off in 1955); 22 April 1940; 86 years ago, 1.2 kV DC system (3rd rail) at opening

Services
Preceding station	Hamburg S-Bahn	Following station
Rübenkamp towards Wedel	S1	Kornweg towards Poppenbüttel
Rübenkamp towards Wedel	S1	Hamburg Airport Terminus
Preceding station	Hamburg U-Bahn	Following station
Klein Borstel towards Norderstedt Mitte	U1	Sengelmannstraße towards Großhansdorf or Ohlstedt
Location

Ohlsdorf is a railway station in Hamburg, Germany, located at the junction of the Hamburg-Altona link line with the Alster Valley line and the Hamburg Airport line in Ohlsdorf, Hamburg near the Ohlsdorf Cemetery.

== History ==
On 6 December 1906, the Hamburg-Altonaer Stadt- und Vorortbahn (City and suburban railway) — later abbreviated Hamburg S-Bahn — opened the double track Ohlsdorf–Blankenese line. Planned as an electric railway with overhead lines, the trains were first steam powered, because of difficulties concerning the construction of the electrical installations and a delay delivering the engines. Overhead lines were completed by 1 October 1907, however, electric operation only started on 29 January 1908.

Prior to 2008, Ohlsdorf had a bus shuttle service to bring passengers from the station to the airport. This was discontinued when a new station was constructed in the airport. An S-Bahn maintenance depot is located south-east of the station.

== Services ==
Announcement „Nächster Halt: Ohlsdorf. Übergang zur S1 und zum Airport-Express.“ in a metro arriving Ohlsdorf in 2007.

Ohlsdorf is served by the Hamburg S-Bahn S1 line — from Wedel in the state of Schleswig-Holstein to Poppenbüttel or Hamburg Airport — and Hamburg U-Bahn U1 line, from Norderstedt to Großhansdorf in Schleswig Holstein or the Hamburg suburb of Wohldorf-Ohlstedt.

Passengers travelling in the direction from the central station to the airport have to pay attention at Ohlsdorf, the last station before the airport, because all trains are split at this station. The front part (carriages 1, 2 and 3) proceeds to the airport, while the rear part (carriages 4, 5 and 6) runs to the suburb of Poppenbüttel. Signs and announcements in German and English language inform passengers. Trains pause at Ohlsdorf for about 2 minutes to couple or uncouple and to allow passengers to change to the desired half of the train.

== Gallery ==
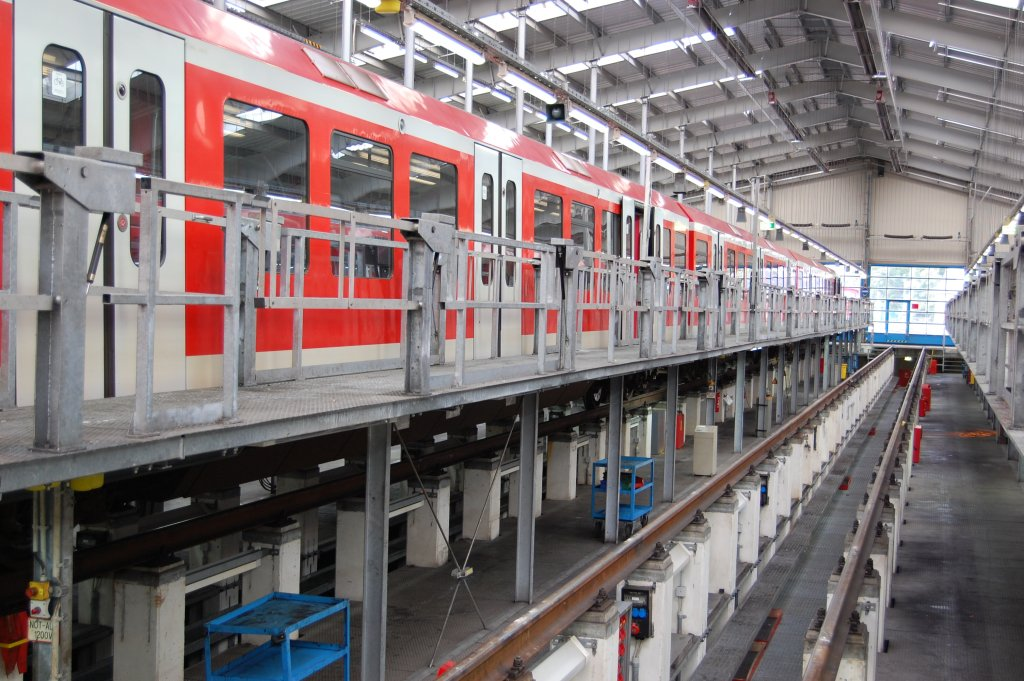
The nearby S-Bahn maintenance depot

== See also ==
- Hamburger Verkehrsverbund (HVV)
- List of Hamburg S-Bahn stations
- List of Hamburg U-Bahn stations
