= List of Hamburg S-Bahn stations =

S Bahn logo

The following is the list of the 68 stations of the Hamburg S-Bahn transit system. The Hamburg S-Bahn is operated by S-Bahn Hamburg GmbH (S-Bahn Hamburg plc) for the Hamburger Verkehrsverbund, the company coordinating public transport in Hamburg, northern Germany.

The stations are listed in alphabetical order, with the line and the connections to other transport systems.

== A ==
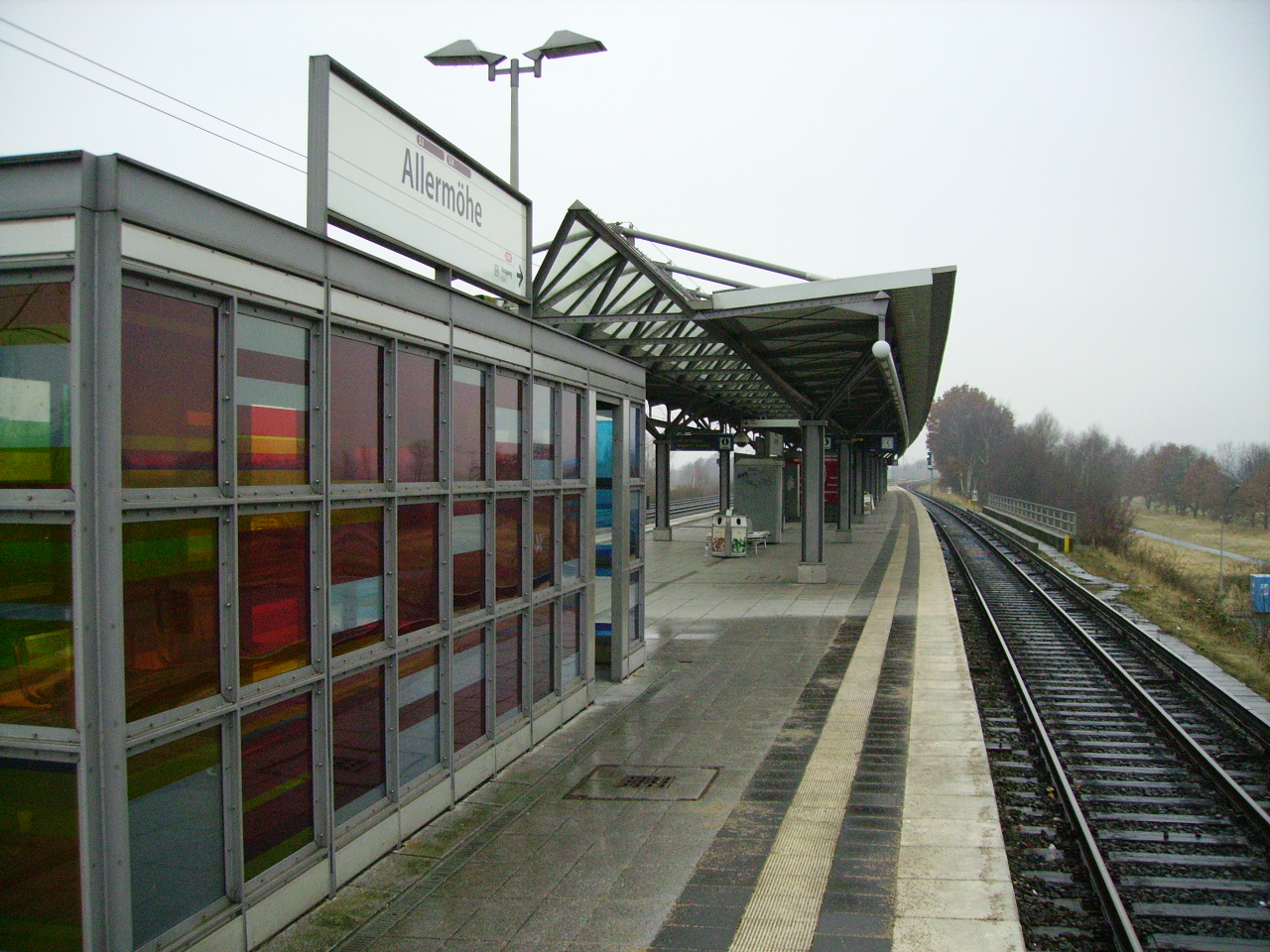
Platform of Allermöhe station in 2009

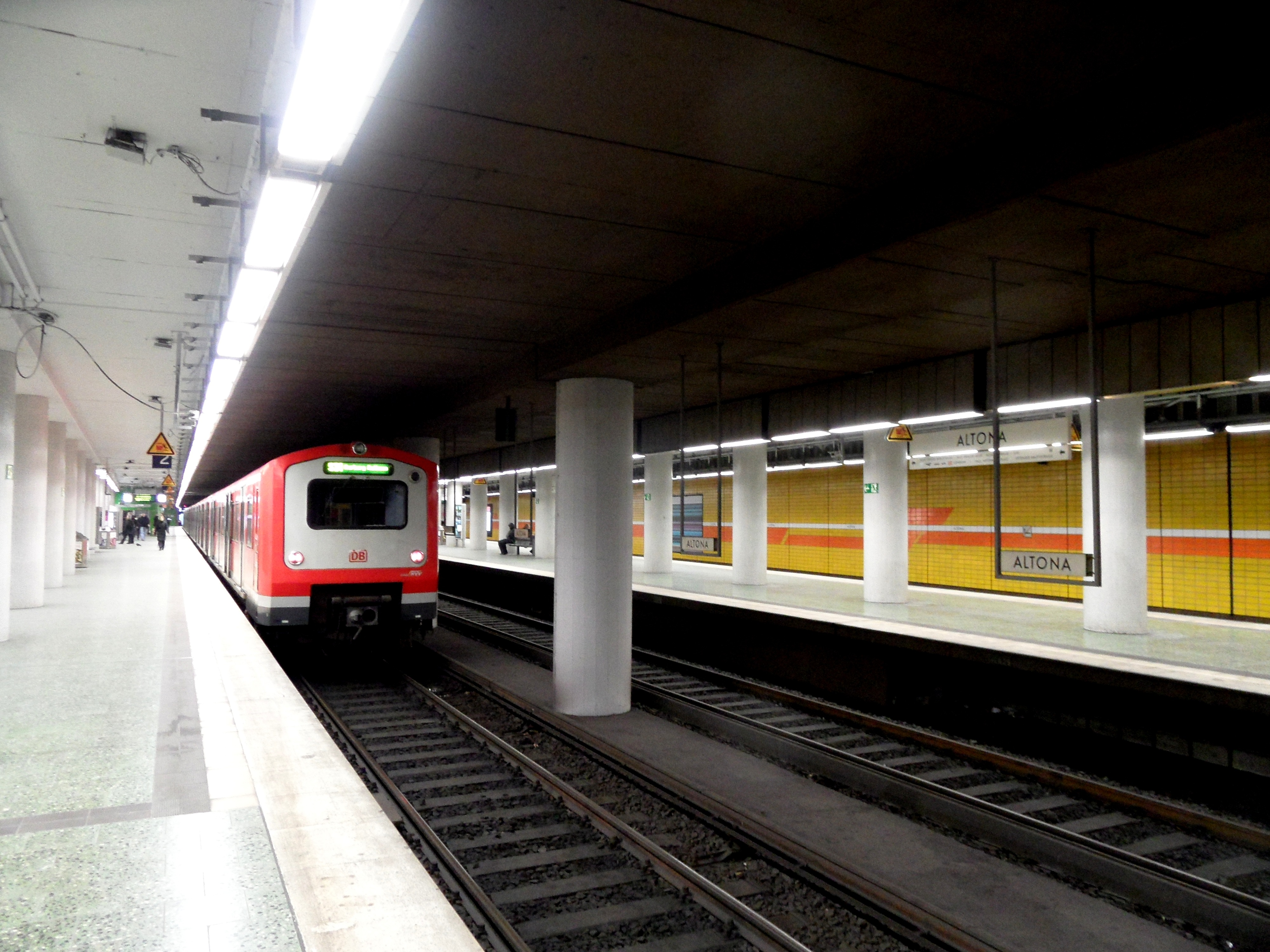
Platform of Altona station in 2012

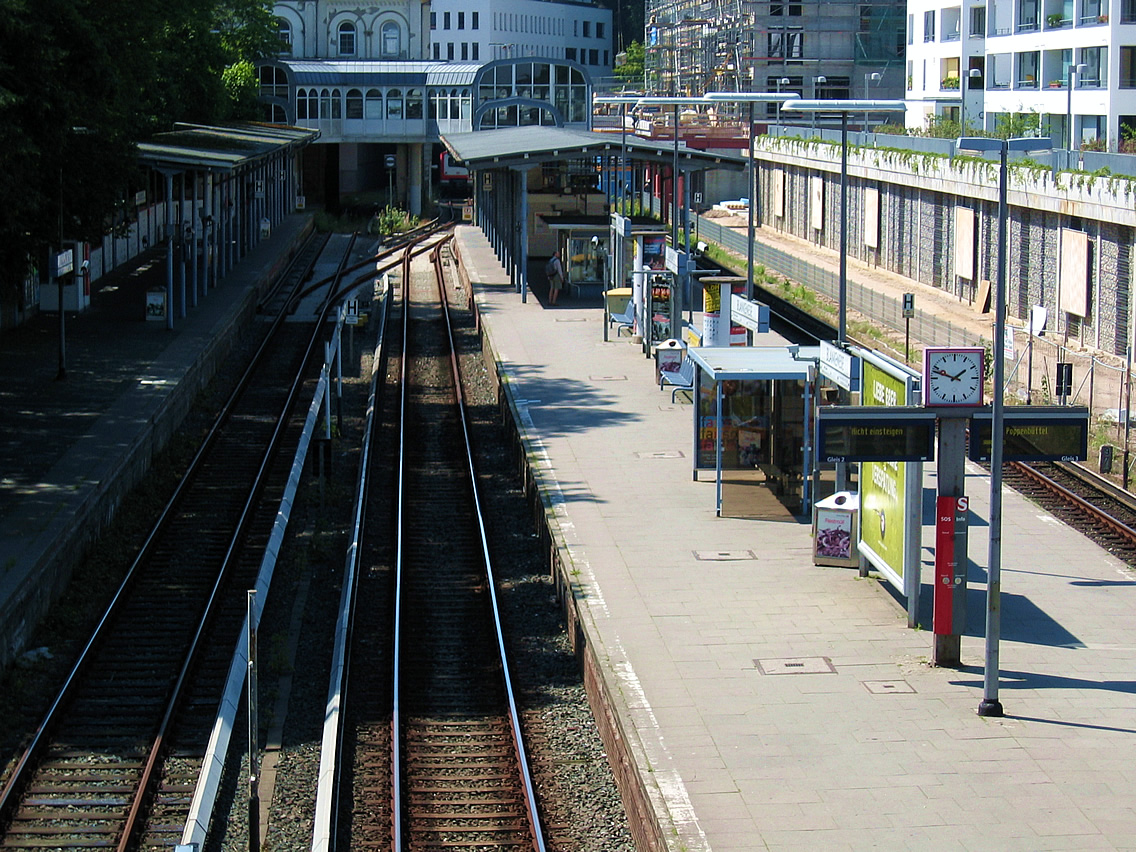
Platform of Blankenese station in 2008

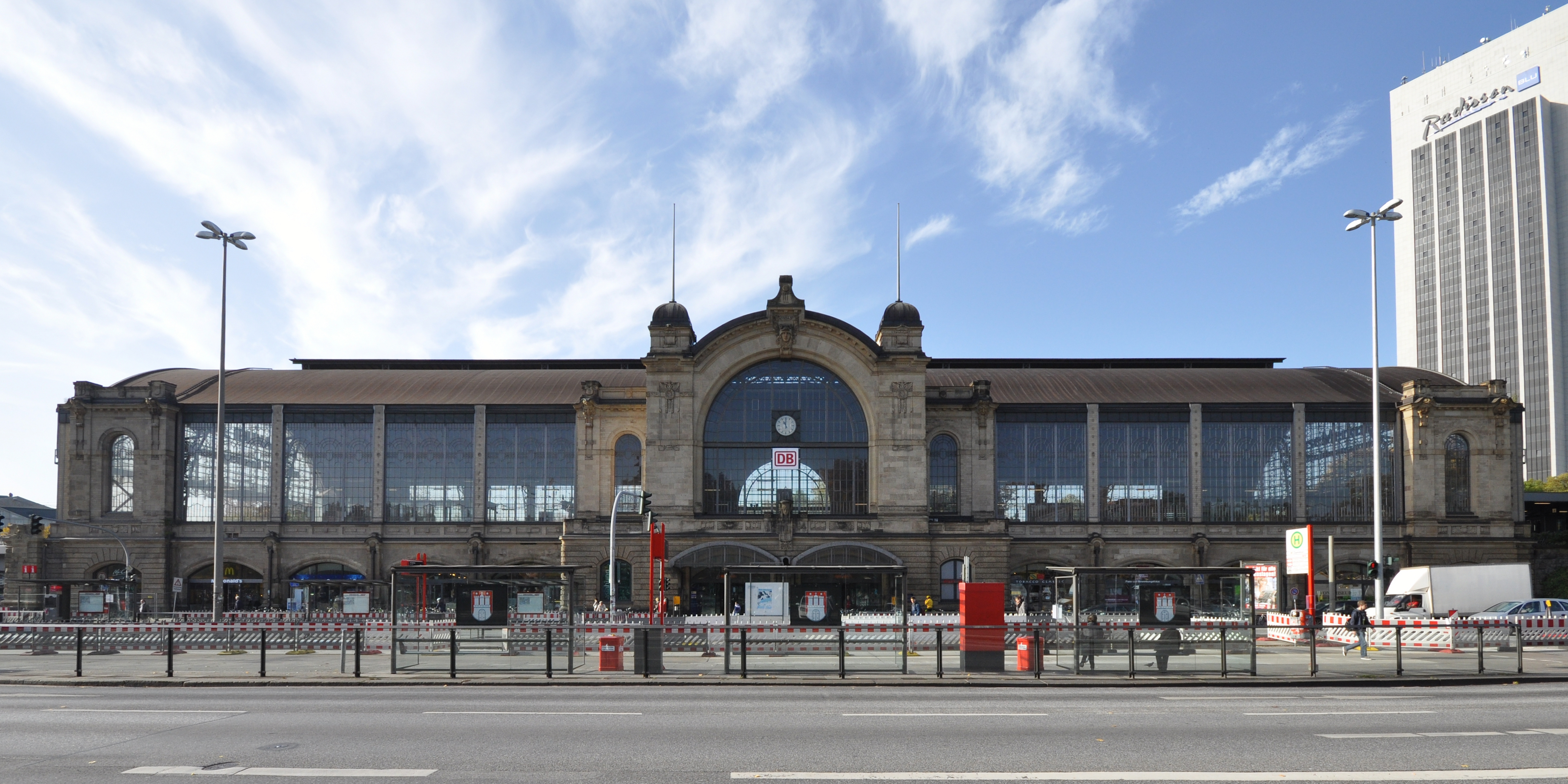
Hamburg Dammtor station for long distance trains and Hamburg S-Bahn

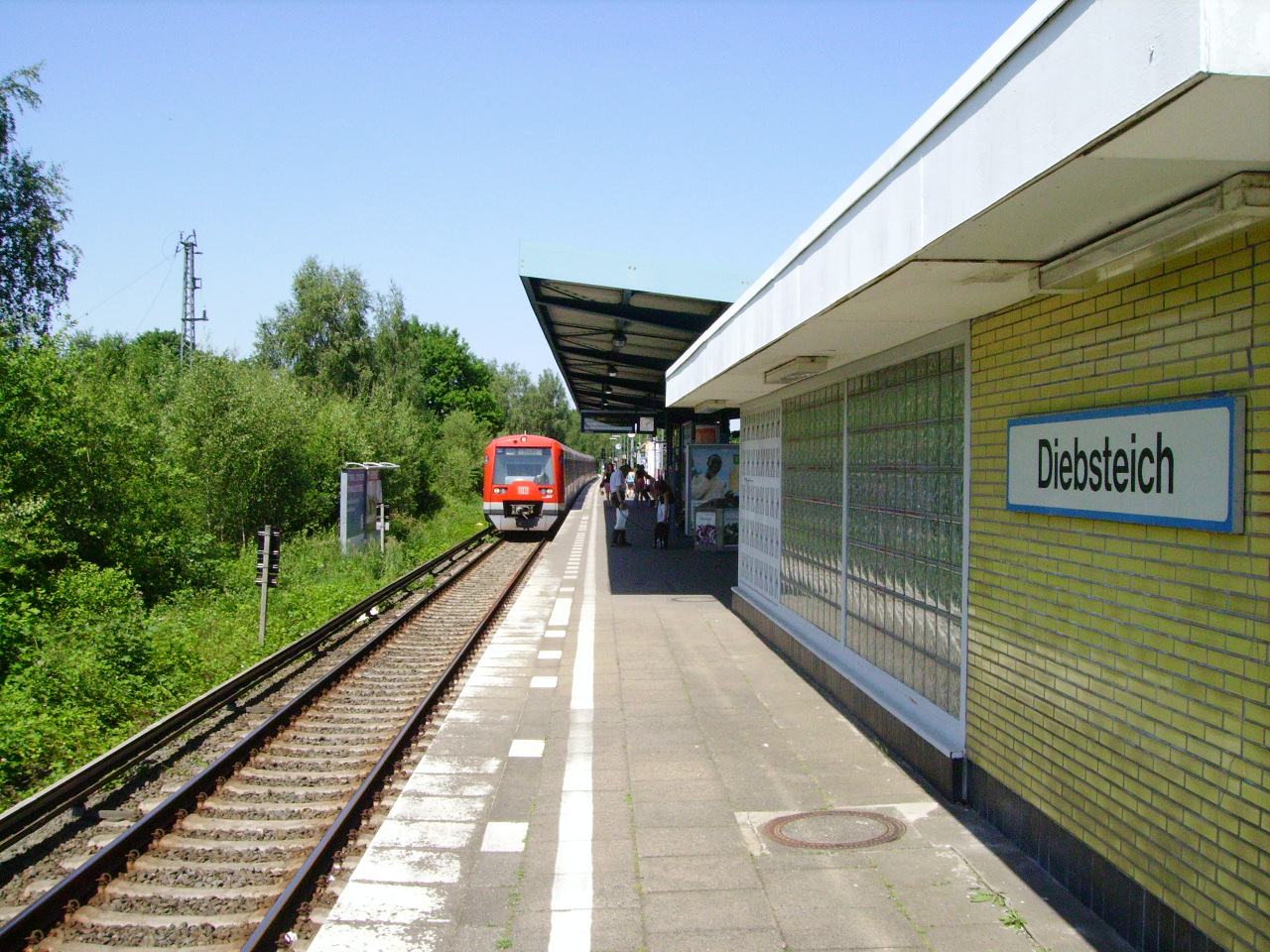
Platform of Diebsteich station

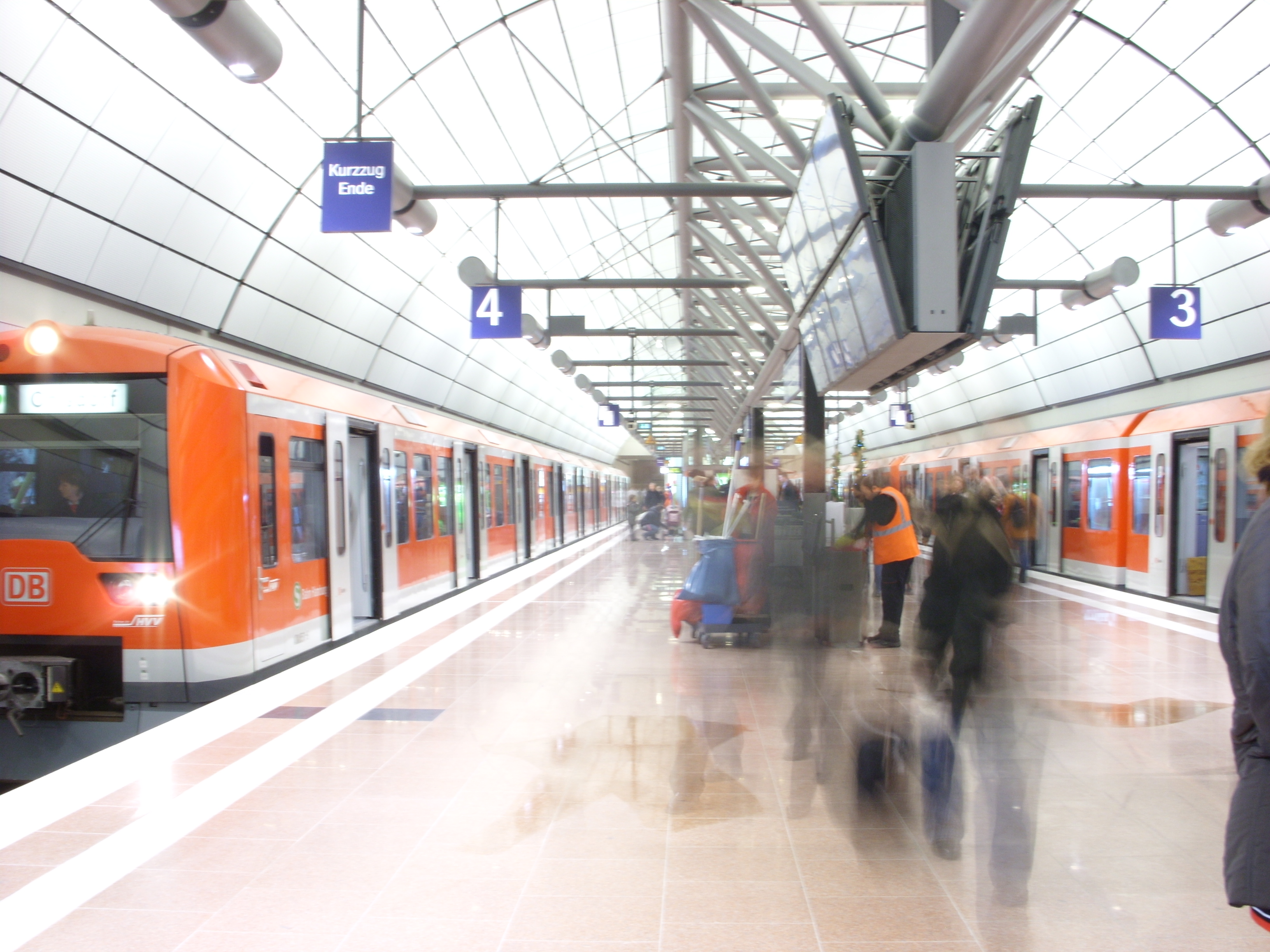
Opening of Hamburg Airport station in 2008

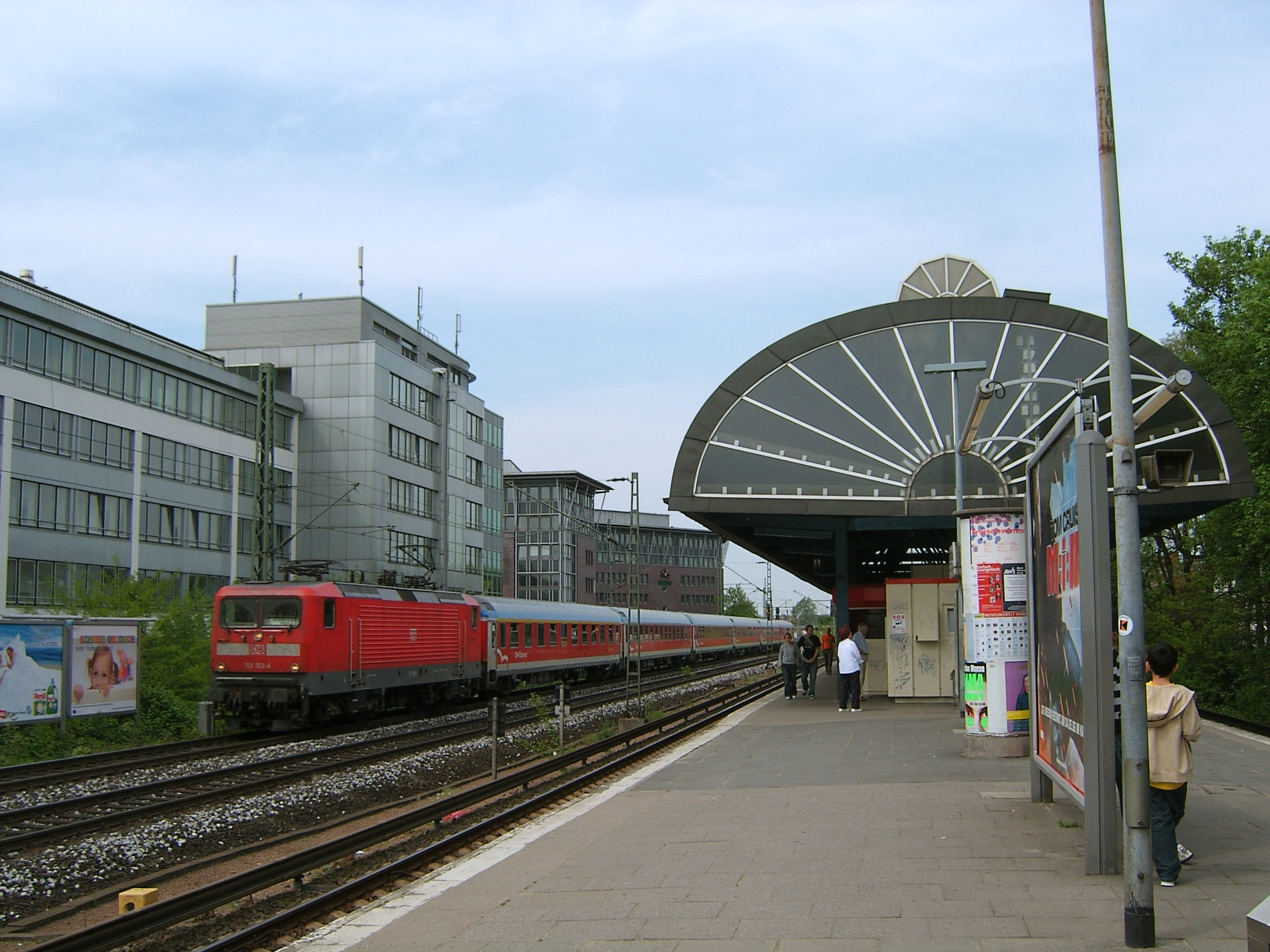
Platform of Holstenstraße station

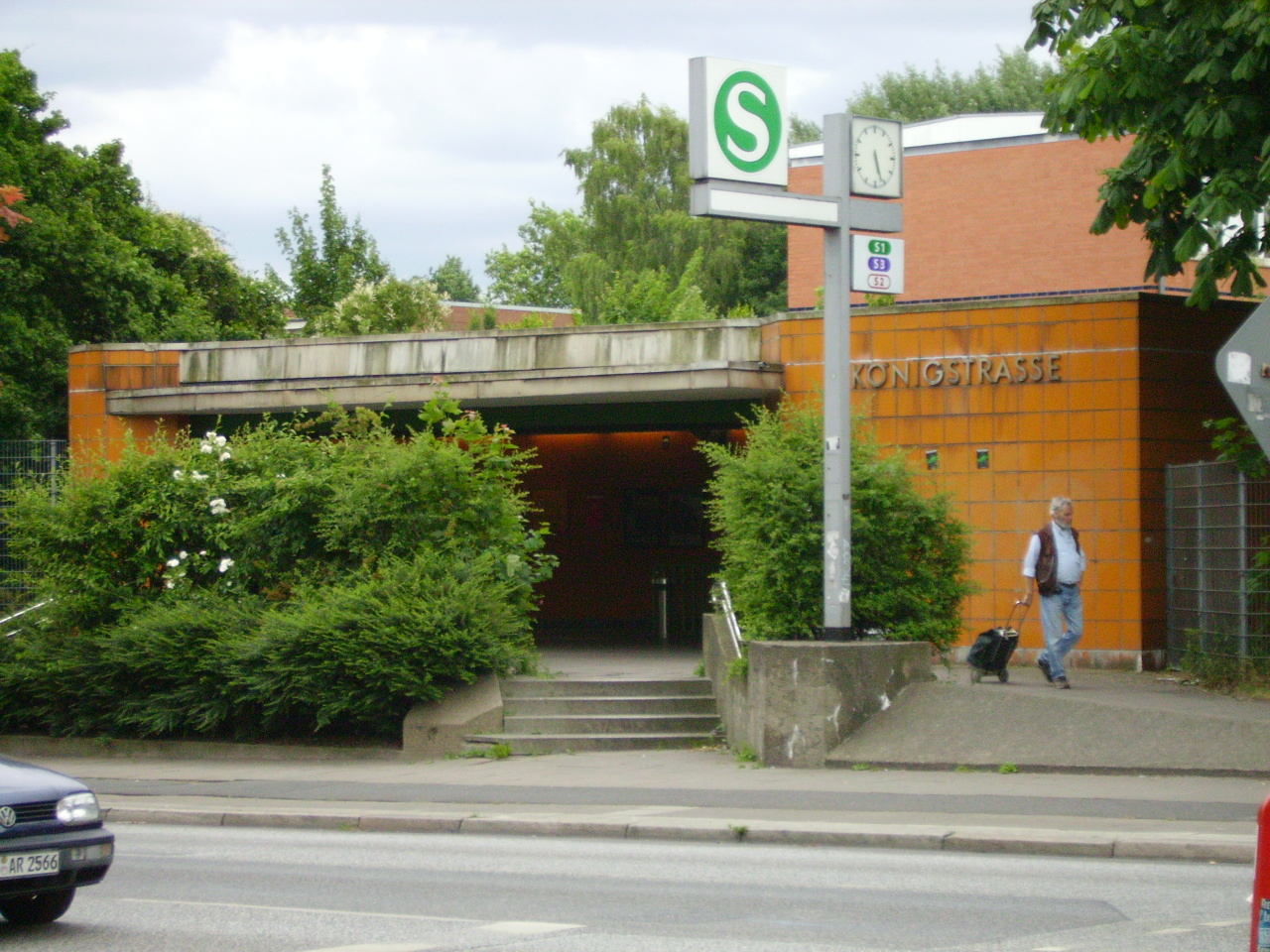
Entrance to underground station at Königstraße

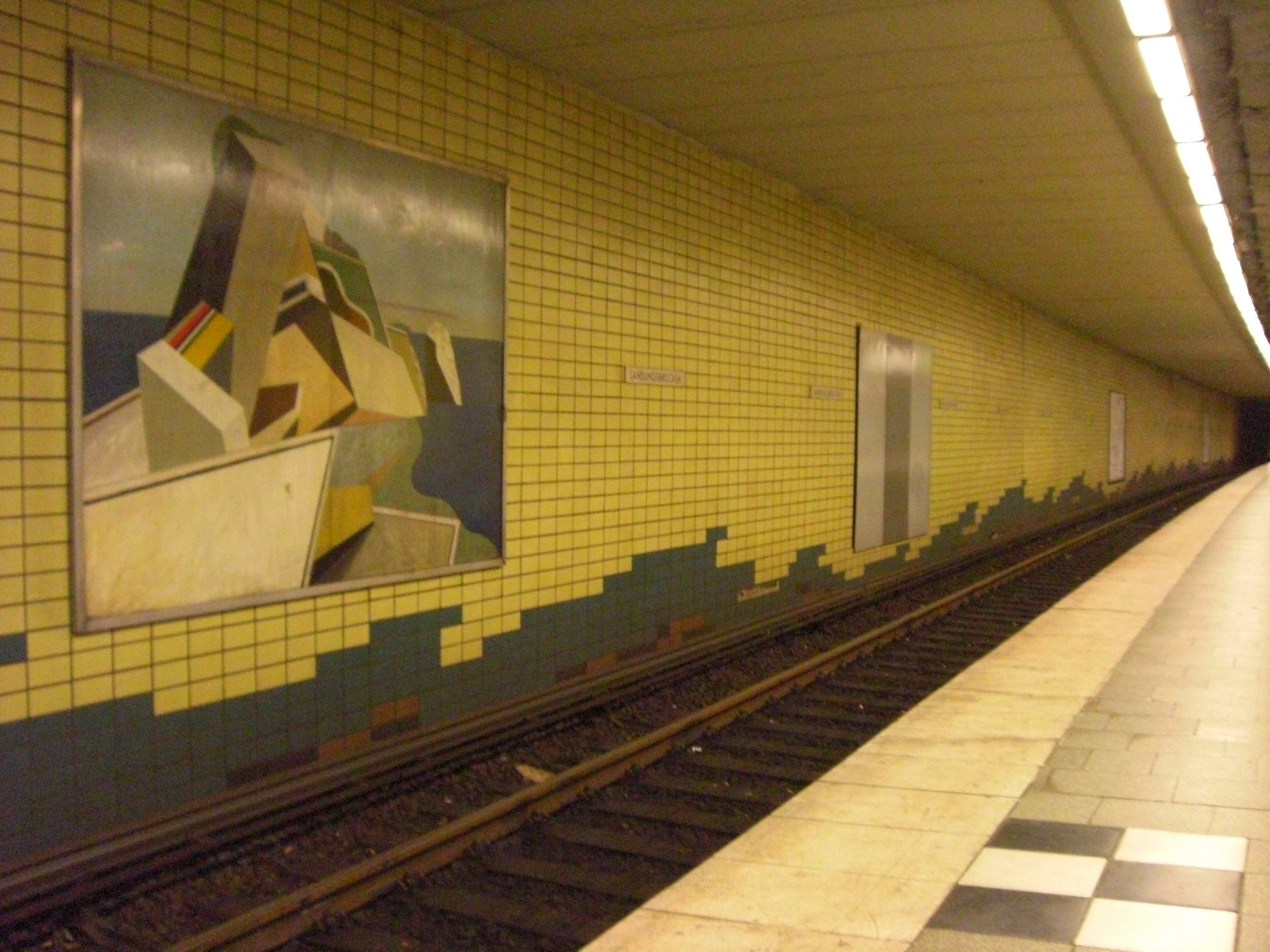
Detail of the wall of Landungsbrücken station

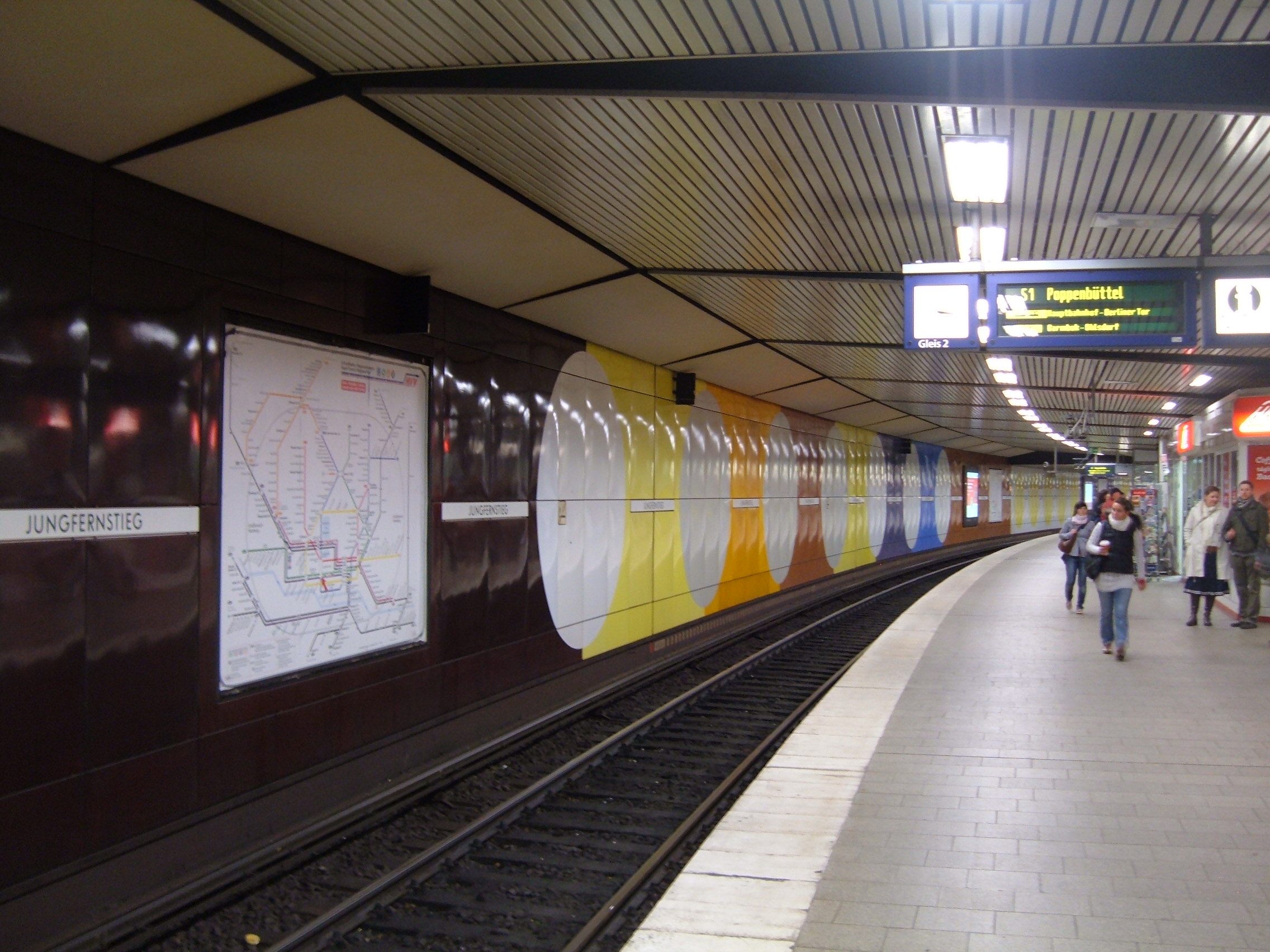
S-Bahn platform of Jungfernstieg station

Name	Line	Location	Connections
Agathenburg		Agathenburg, Lower Saxony	
Allermöhe			Bus
Alte Wöhr			Bus
Altona			
Aumühle			

== B ==
Name	Line	Location	Connections
Bahrenfeld	S1		
Barmbek	S1		Hamburg U-Bahn:
Bergedorf	S2		Regional railway:
Berliner Tor	S1		Hamburg U-Bahn:
Berliner Tor	S2		Hamburg U-Bahn:
Billwerder-Moorfleet	S2		Bus
Blankenese	S1	Blankenese	Bus
Buxtehude	S5	Buxtehude, Lower Saxony	Regional railway:

== D ==
Name	Line	Location	Connections
Dammtor	S2		Long distance trains and regional railway:
Dammtor	S5		Long distance trains and regional railway:
Diebsteich	S3		Bus
Diebsteich	S5		Bus
Dollern	S5	Dollern, Lower Saxony	

== E ==
Name	Line	Location	Connections
Eidelstedt	S3		AKN railway:
Eidelstedt	S5		AKN railway:
Elbgaustraße	S3		Bus
Elbgaustraße	S5		Bus

== F ==
Name	Line	Location	Connections
Fischbek	S5		
Friedrichsberg	S1		

== H ==
Name	Line	Location	Connections
Halstenbek		Halstenbek, Schleswig-Holstein	Bus
Hammerbrook	S3		Bus
Hammerbrook	S5		Bus
Hamburg Airport (Flughafen)	S1	Fuhlsbüttel	
Harburg	S3		Long distance trains and regional railway:
Harburg	S5		Long distance trains and regional railway:
Harburg Rathaus	S3		Bus
Harburg Rathaus	S5		Bus
Hasselbrook	S1		Regional railway:
Hauptbahnhof	S1		Long distance trains and regional railway:
Hauptbahnhof	S2		Long distance trains and regional railway:
Hauptbahnhof	S3		Long distance trains and regional railway:
Hauptbahnhof	S5		Long distance trains and regional railway:
Heimfeld	S3		Bus
Heimfeld	S5		Bus
Hochkamp	S1		
Hoheneichen	S1		
Holstenstraße	S2		Bus
Holstenstraße	S5		Bus
Horneburg	S5		Regional railway:

== I ==
Name	Line	Location	Connections
Iserbrook	S1		Bus

== J ==
Name	Line	Location	Connections
Jungfernstieg	S1		Hamburg U-Bahn:
Jungfernstieg	S3		Hamburg U-Bahn:

== K ==
Name	Line	Location	Connections
Klein Flottbek	S1		Bus
Königstraße	S1		
Königstraße	S3		
Kornweg	S1		
Krupunder	S3	Halstenbek, Schleswig-Holstein	Bus

== L ==
Name	Line	Location	Connections
Landungsbrücken	S1		Hamburg U-Bahn:
Landungsbrücken	S3		Hamburg U-Bahn:
Landwehr	S1		Bus
Langenfelde	S3		
Langenfelde	S5		

== M ==
Name	Line	Location	Connections
Mittlerer Landweg	S2		Bus

== N ==
Name	Line	Location	Connections
Nettelnburg	S2		Bus
Neu Wulmstorf	S5	Neu Wulmstorf, Lower Saxony	Bus
Neugraben	S3		Bus
Neugraben	S5		Bus
Neukloster	S5	Buxtehude, Lower Saxony	
Neuwiedenthal	S3		Bus
Neuwiedenthal	S5		Bus

== O ==
Name	Line	Location	Connections
Ohlsdorf	S1		Hamburg U-Bahn:
Othmarschen	S1	Othmarschen quarter	Bus

== P ==
Name	Line	Location	Connections
Pinneberg	S3	Pinneberg, Schleswig-Holstein	Regional rail
Poppenbüttel	S1		Bus

== R ==
Name	Line	Location	Connections
Reeperbahn	S1		Bus
Reeperbahn	S3		Bus
Reinbek	S2		Bus
Rissen	S1		Bus
Rothenburgsort	S2		Bus
Rübenkamp	S1		Bus

== S ==
Name	Line	Location	Connections
Stade	S5	Stade, Lower Saxony	Regional rail
Stadthausbrücke	S1		
Stadthausbrücke	S3		
Stellingen	S3		Bus
Stellingen	S5		Bus
Sternschanze	S2		Hamburg U-Bahn:
Sternschanze	S5		Hamburg U-Bahn:
Sülldorf	S1		

== T ==
Name	Line	Location	Connections
Thesdorf	S3	Pinneberg, Schleswig-Holstein	Bus
Tiefstack	S2		Bus

== V ==
Name	Line	Location	Connections
Veddel	S3		Bus
Veddel	S5		Bus

== W ==
Name	Line	Location	Connections
Wandsbeker Chaussee	S1		Hamburg U-Bahn:
Wedel	S1	Wedel, Schleswig-Holstein	Bus
Wellingsbüttel	S1		Bus
Wilhelmsburg	S3	Wilhelmsburg quarter	Bus
Wilhelmsburg	S5	Wilhelmsburg quarter	Bus
Wohltorf	S2		

== See also ==
- Hamburg U-Bahn
- Hamburger Verkehrsverbund (Public transport organisation in Hamburg)
