= Ohlsdorf, Hamburg =

Quarter of the German city of Hamburg

Ohlsdorf
- Quarter of Hamburg
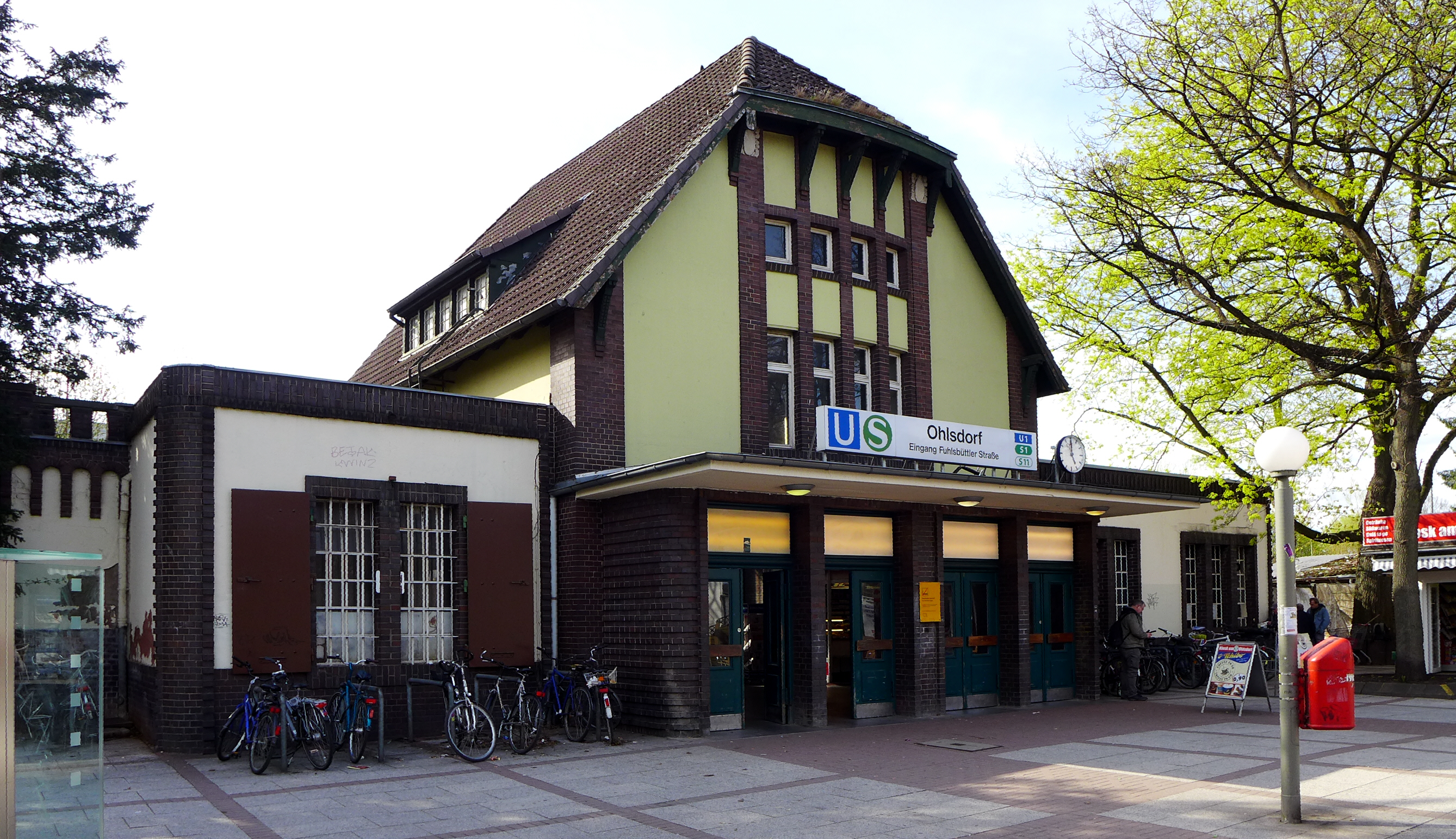
- Ohlsdorf station

- Location of Ohlsdorf within Hamburg
- Interactive map of Ohlsdorf
- Location within Germany Location within Hamburg
- Coordinates: 53°37′18″N 10°02′16″E
- Country: Germany
- State: Hamburg
- City: Hamburg
- Borough: Hamburg-Nord

Area
  - Total: 7.2 km^{2} (2.8 sq mi)

Population (2024-12-31)
  - Total: 17,813
  - Density: 2,500/km^{2} (6,400/sq mi)
- Time zone: UTC+01:00 (CET)
  - Summer (DST): UTC+02:00 (CEST)

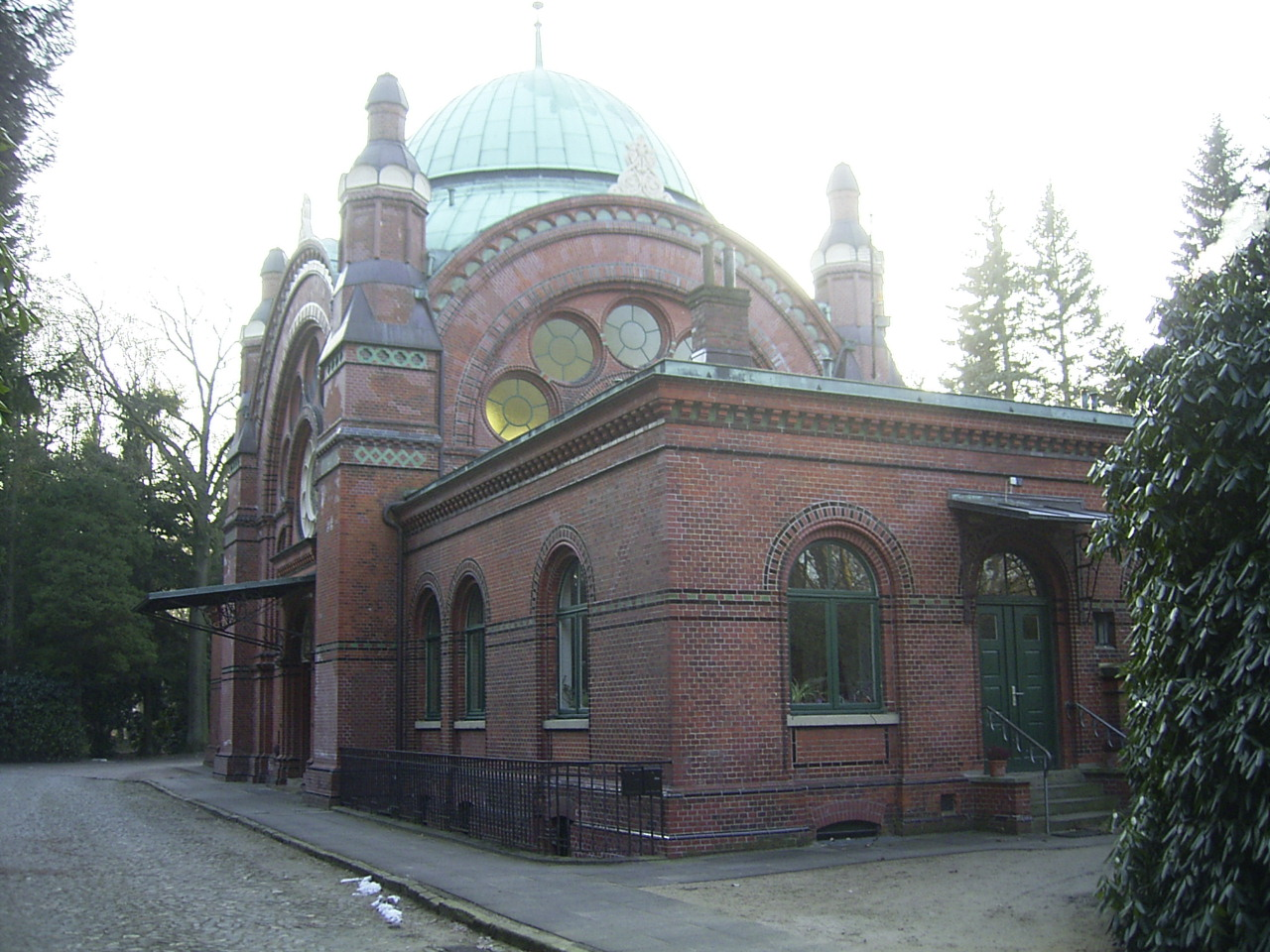
Mourning hall of the Jewish cemetery in Ohlsdorf

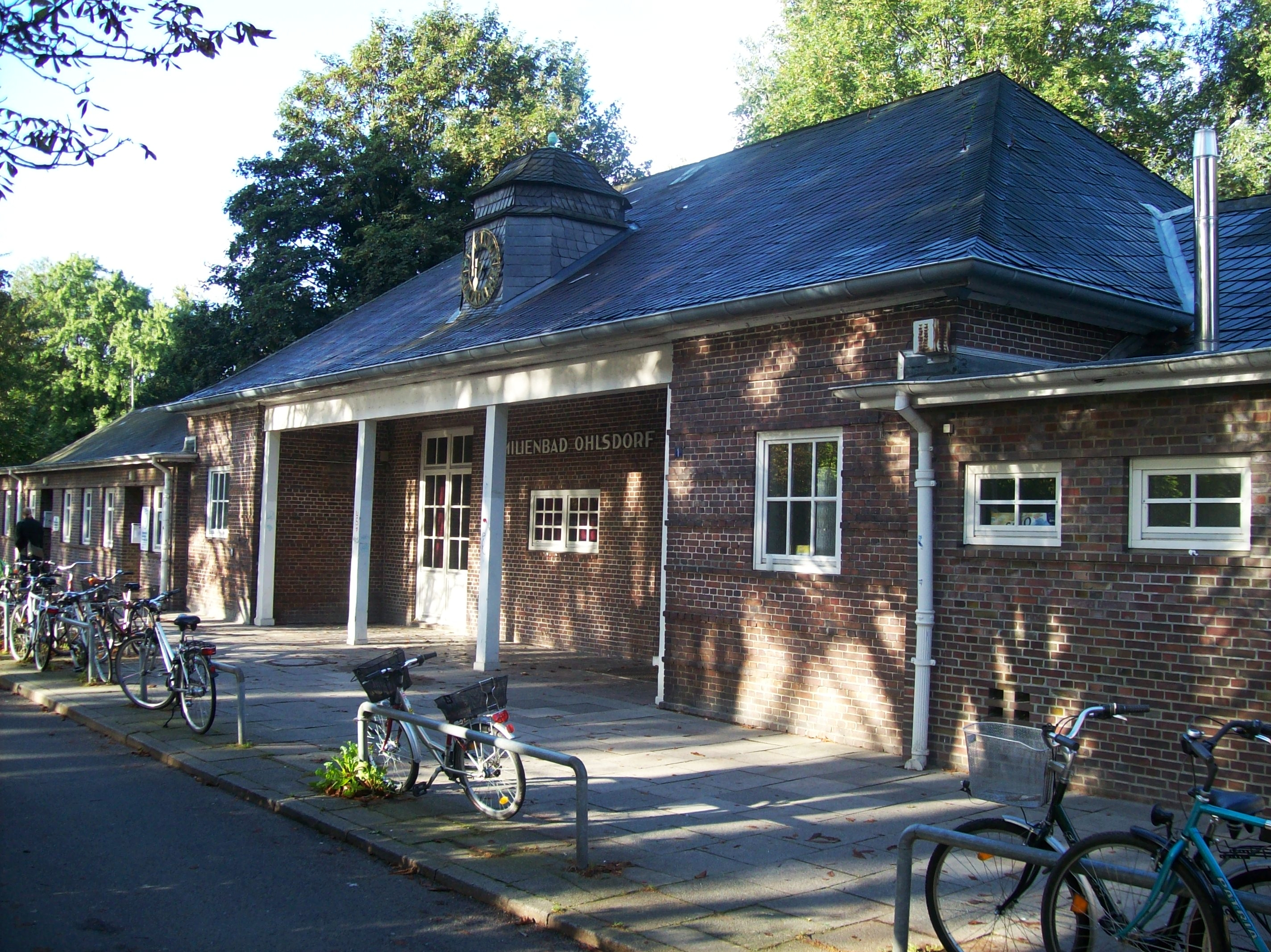
Old entrance of the Familienbad Ohlsdorf, a public pool at Ohlsdorf station

Ohlsdorf (German pronunciation: [ˈoːlsˌdɔʁf]) is a quarter of Hamburg, Germany. Within the quarter, the Ohlsdorf Cemetery, the largest of Hamburg, is located. The cemetery is also considered the largest rural cemetery of the world.

== Geography ==
Ohlsdorf is bordered to the north by Hummelsbüttel, to the east by Wellingsbüttel, Bramfeld and Steilshoop, to the south by Barmbek-Nord and to the west by Alsterdorf and Fuhlsbüttel. The Alster marks the boundaries to Hummelsbüttel and partly also to Fuhlsbüttel and Alsterdorf.

Since the area consists largely of cemetery grounds, Klein Borstel and the southern part of Fuhlsbüttel belong administratively to the Ohlsdorf quarter - including the Fuhlsbüttel prison, called Santa Fu.

== Transportation ==
The important public transit hub of Ohlsdorf station is situated in the quarter, also Kornweg station of the Hamburg S-Bahn.
