= Wellingsbüttel =

- Quarter of Hamburg
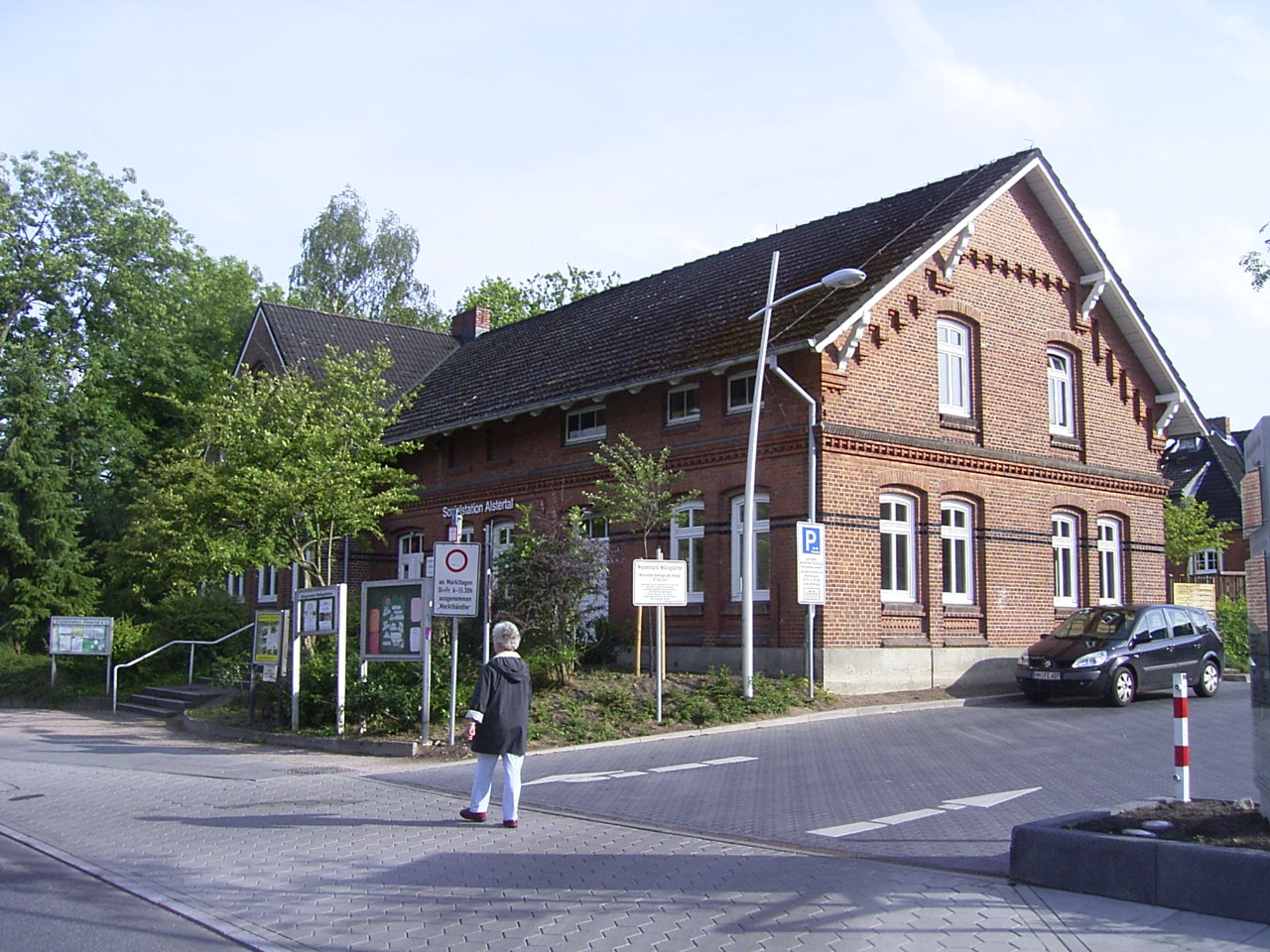
- Former school (1888–1974) in Wellingsbüttel, now a health and advice centre and branch of the public libraries.

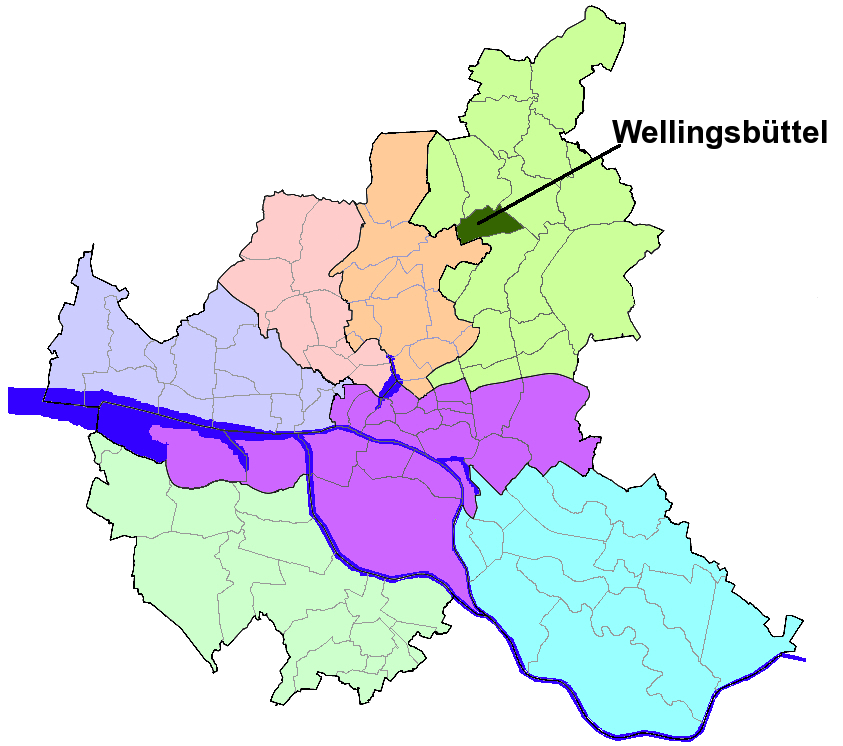
- Location of Rahlstedt in the city of Hamburg
- Interactive map of Wellingsbüttel
- Location within Germany Location within Hamburg
- Coordinates: 53°38′N 10°5′E
- Country: Germany
- State: Hamburg
- City: Hamburg
- Borough: Wandsbek

Population (2024-12-31)
  - Total: 11,168
- Time zone: UTC+01:00 (CET)
  - Summer (DST): UTC+02:00 (CEST)
- Dialling codes: 040
- Vehicle registration: HH

Wellingsbüttel (German pronunciation: [vɛlɪŋsˈbʏtl̩]), a quarter in the Wandsbek borough in the city of Hamburg in northern Germany, is a former independent settlement. In 2020 the population was 10,935.

== History ==
The first records on Wellingsbüttel are from 1296. Wellingsbüttel became a part of Hamburg in 1937/1938 through the Greater Hamburg Act.

== Geography ==
In 2007 according to the statistical office of Hamburg and Schleswig-Holstein, the quarter had a total area of 4.1 km^{2} (1.6 sq mi). It is located in the Alster river valley (Alstertal) in northern Hamburg. To the north are the quarters Poppenbüttel and Sasel (north-east), to the east is Bramfeld, and to the south is the Ohlsdorf quarter of the Hamburg-Nord district.

== Demographics ==
In 2007, the Wellingsbüttel quarter had a population of 9,874 people. The population density was 2,419 people per km^{2}. 15.7% were children under the age of 18, and 27.5% were 65 years of age or older. 6.3% were immigrants. 130 people were registered as unemployed and 2,360 were employees subject to social insurance contributions.

In 1999, there were 4,724 households, out of which 17.9% had children under the age of 18 living with them and 38.7% of all households were made up of individuals. The average household size was 2.06.

In 2007, there were 577 criminal offences (59 crimes per 1000 people).

== Education ==
There were 2 elementary schools in 2007.

== Culture ==
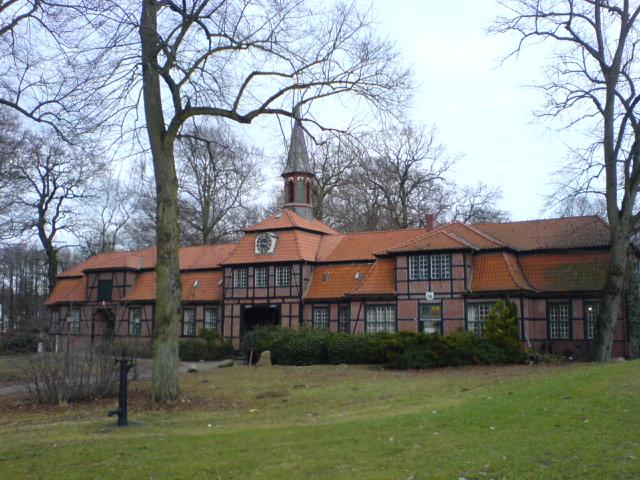
The gatehouse, part of which is now occupied by the Alstertal Museum

=== Museums ===
The private Alstertal Museum is located in the gatehouse of Wellingsbüttel Manor since 1957.

== Infrastructure ==
=== Health systems ===
In 2007 Wellingsbüttel had 5 day-care centers for children and also 21 physicians in private practice and 2 pharmacies.

=== Transportation ===
Public transport in Wellingsbüttel is provided by the rapid transit system of the city train with the Wellingsbüttel station and several bus lines. This is coordinated through the Hamburger Verkehrsverbund.

According to the Department of Motor Vehicles (Kraftfahrt-Bundesamt), in the quarter were 4,788 private cars registered (486 cars/1000 people) in 2007. There were 47 traffic accidents total, including 36 traffic accidents with damage to persons.

== Notes ==
=== References ===
- Statistical office Hamburg and Schleswig-Holstein Statistisches Amt für Hamburg und Schleswig-Holstein, official website (in German)
