= Alster Valley Railway =

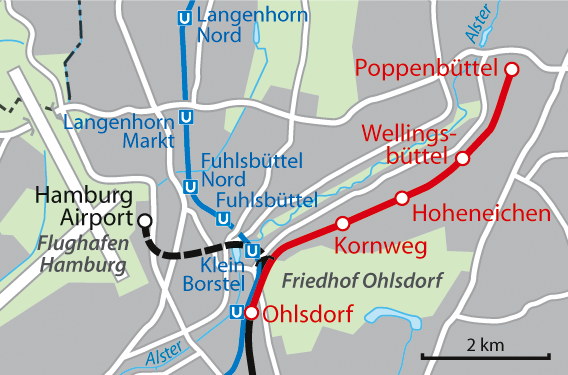

Overview
- Native name: Alstertalbahn
- Line number: 1241

Service
- Route number: 101.1

Technical
- Line length: 5.7 km (3.5 mi)
- Track gauge: 1,435 mm (4 ft 8 1/2 in) standard gauge
- Electrification: 1,200 V DC third rail
- Operating speed: 80 km/h (50 mph) (maximum)

The Alster Valley Railway (German: Alstertalbahn) is a railway line in Hamburg, which is nearly six-kilometre long. It is entirely double track and is served by line S1 of the Hamburg S-Bahn along its entire length. It leaves the extension of the Hamburg-Altona link line at Ohlsdorf station and runs to Poppenbüttel. The original plans envisaged an extension to Wohldorf or Volksdorf.

== History ==
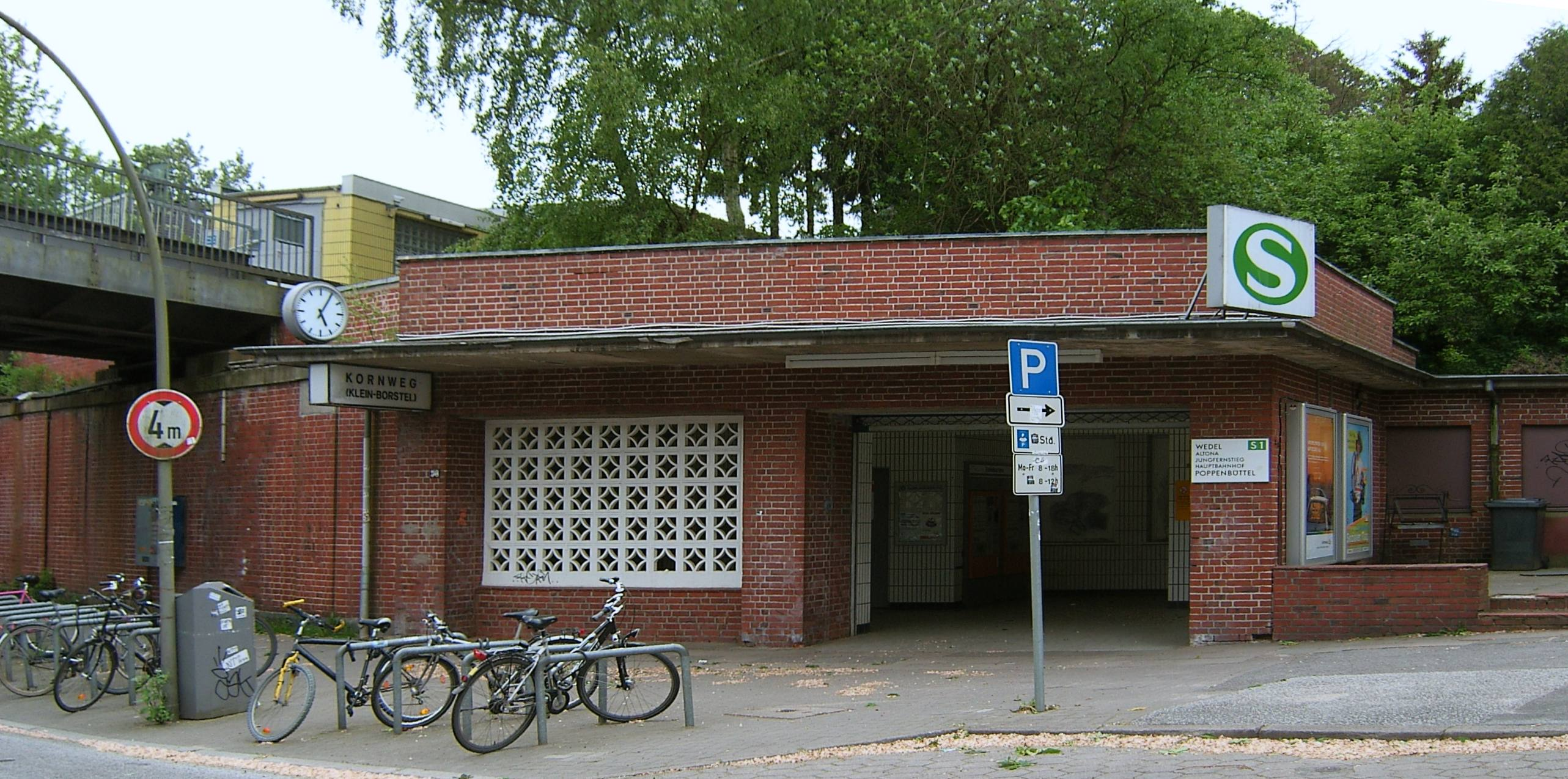
Kornweg station

Shortly after the turn of the century, several villages in the area around Hamburg, including enclaves of the city sought a connection to the city's railway network. Apart from the Alster Valley line, this effort led to the construction of the Forest Villages line (Walddörferbahn), starting in 1912. This line later became part of the Hamburg U-Bahn and is now mostly served by line U1. Just one year after the signing of the Ohlsdorf Treaty, which was the basis for the Hamburg-Altona City and Suburban Railway—the precursor of the S-Bahn—on 12 December 1905, a community group formed to promote the extension of the suburban railway through Ohlsdorf to the Alster Valley and beyond.

The Havestadt & Contag Company of Berlin was engaged to plan the building of the line. It was planned that they would be built as follows: the line would run from Ohlsdorf on the Hamburg-Altona link line to Poppenbüttel, where the line would divide. An eastern branch would run to Volksdorf and a western branch to Wohldorf. Trains would serve the two branches equally.

The Alster Valley Company (Alstertal Bahn GmbH), which had been founded on 4 May 1908 to operate the route, negotiated with the Prussian government and the city of Hamburg. Under the compromise negotiated, it was agreed that the line would only initially run only to Poppenbüttel, as the following villages to be served were exclaves of Hamburg and thus needed an additional special license. The initial section was planned to be double track and electrified throughout from the beginning.

The license for the less than six-kilometre section between Ohlsdorf and Poppenbüttel was issued on 3 December 1912 by Hamburg and on 31 May 1913 by Prussia. It was intended that the line would go into operation three years later.

Meanwhile, Alstertalbahn GmbH was converted into a joint-stock company and operated under the name of Alstertalbahn-Aktien-Gesellschaft (ABAG). The main shareholder in the company in 1912 was the entrepreneur Johann von Wentzel, a developer of the valley.

=== Construction and operation ===
A Berlin-based company, Julius Berger AG was commissioned in 1913 to carry out the works. However, since the First World War began a year later, work was quickly brought to a halt by material and labour shortages. ABAG also had difficulties in selling its land and thus got into financial difficulties. The planned start-up date thus could not be met.

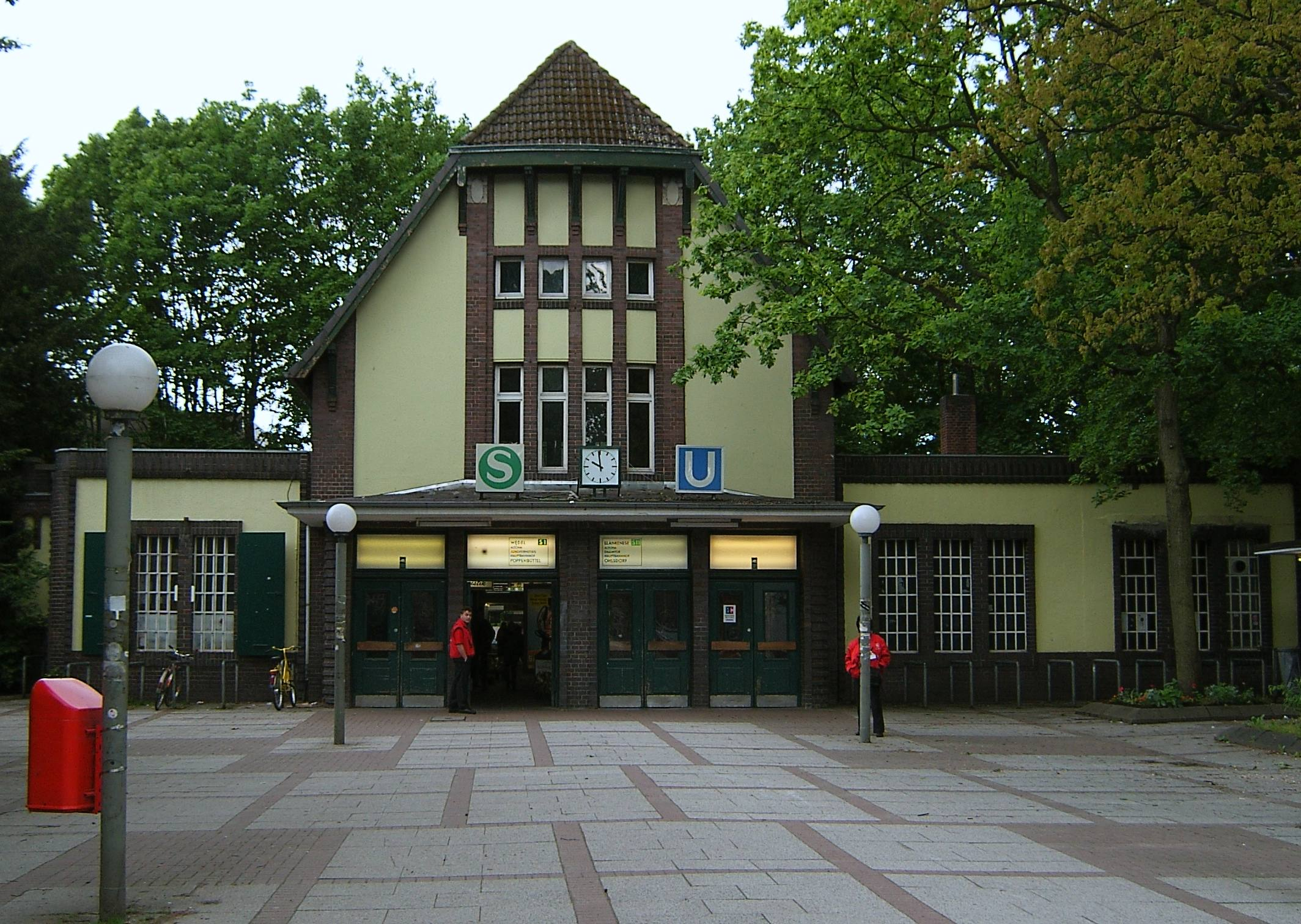
Reception hall of Ohlsdorf station, the starting point of the line

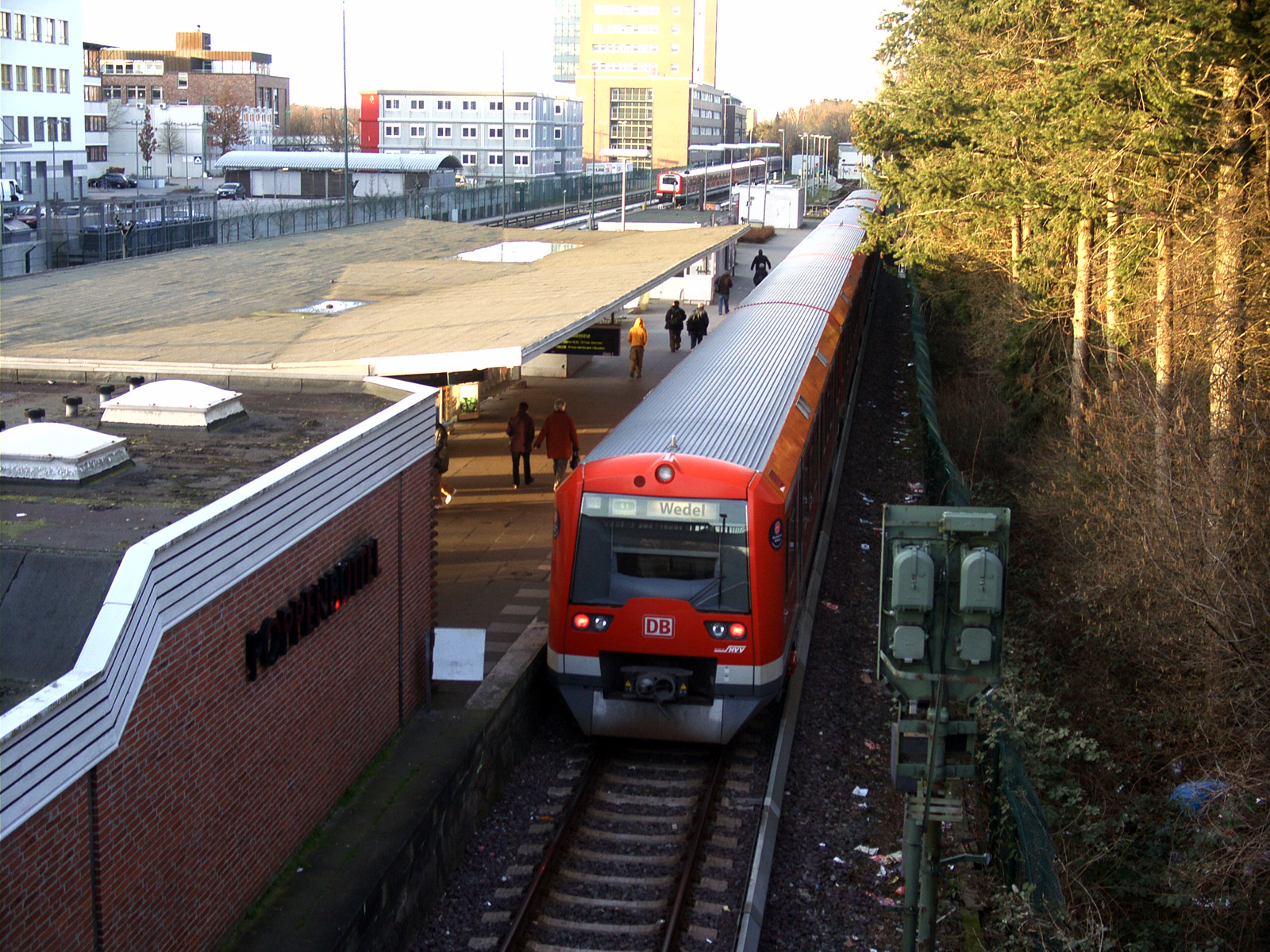
Class 474 EMU in Poppenbüttel station at the end of the line

Under the difficult conditions the line—originally single track—was completed and authorised to operate by the state police. Temporary operations began on 15 January 1918, but operated with petrol-powered railcars, rather than electric railcars. Not enough copper was available for overhead wires. The remaining work was completed on 10 July 1920, six months after the ratification of the Treaty of Versailles. By this time ABAG had runs out of funds and its main shareholder liquidated it on 10 November 1920. In 1922, the Stormarn district, in which the villages were located, took over ABAG's shares and continued construction of the line. Electric operations were fully commissioned on 24 March 1924.

On 22 April 1940, the electrical system was partially converted. In addition to the existing system of electrification with 6.3 kV at 25 Hz alternating current, a third rail was installed at the side of the track with 1.2 kV direct current. Parallel electrical operations continued until 1955, when the overhead line was removed. The Alster Valley Railway was therefore the first line of the Hamburg S-Bahn to operate on its current electrical system.
