= Poppenbüttel station =

Railway station in Hamburg, Germany

Coordinates: 53°39′8″N 10°5′38″E

Poppenbüttel
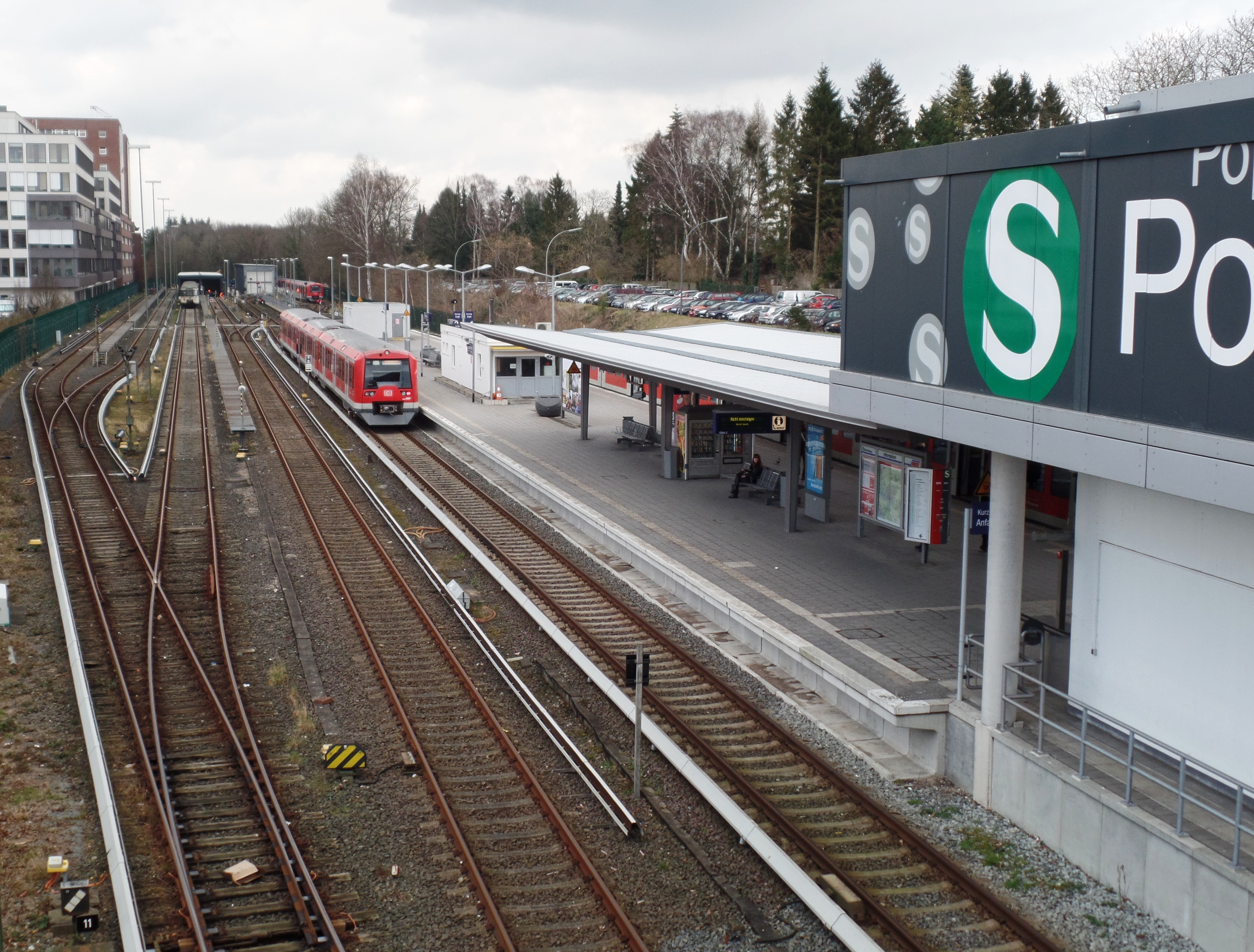

General information
- Location: Stormarnplatz 1; 22393 Hamburg; Wandsbek, Poppenbüttel, Hamburg; Germany
- System: Hamburg S-Bahn
- Tracks: 2
- Connections: Bus

Construction
- Structure type: Surface level

Other information
- Station code: 4993
- DS100 code: APB
- Category: 4
- Fare zone: hvv: B/304
- Website: www.bahnhof.de/poppenbuettel

History
- Opened: 15 January 1918; 108 years ago
- Electrified: 12 March 1924; 102 years ago

Passengers
- 2019: 16,985/day

Services
Preceding station	Hamburg S-Bahn	Following station
Wellingsbüttel towards Wedel	S1	Terminus
Location

Poppenbüttel (German pronunciation: [ˈpɔpɛnbytɛl]) is a railway station on the Alster Valley line located in Hamburg, Germany. Alongside Hamburg Airport station, the station acts as the eastern terminus of the Hamburg S-Bahn S1 line.

== History ==
On 15 January 1918, Poppenbüttel station opened as the terminus of the Alster Valley line which had begun operating freight services only a year earlier. Plans included the electrification of the line. Due to a shortage of copper after World War I, electrification using overhead wires was only completed in 1924.

In 1940, the overhead wire AC electrification was replaced by third-rail DC electrification which remains the standard system on the Hamburg S-Bahn network today. Freight services were discontinued on 1 August 1993. The unused facilities were demolished shortly after and replaced by the Poppenbüttel S-Bahn maintenance depot.

Between 2011 and 2013, the station and the adjacent bus station underwent extensive refurbishment, including the addition of a step-free access via lifts.

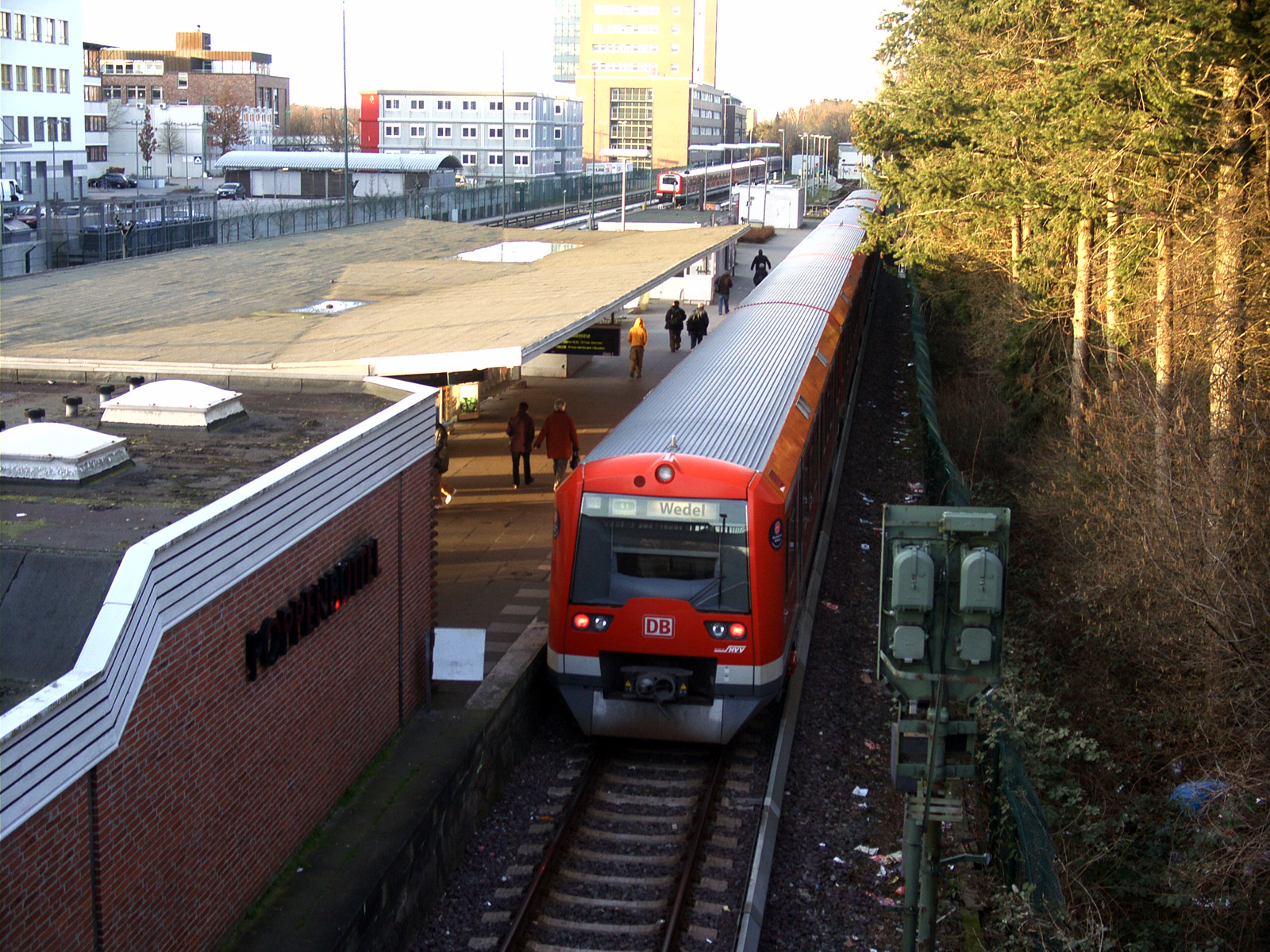
Poppenbüttel station before refurbishment

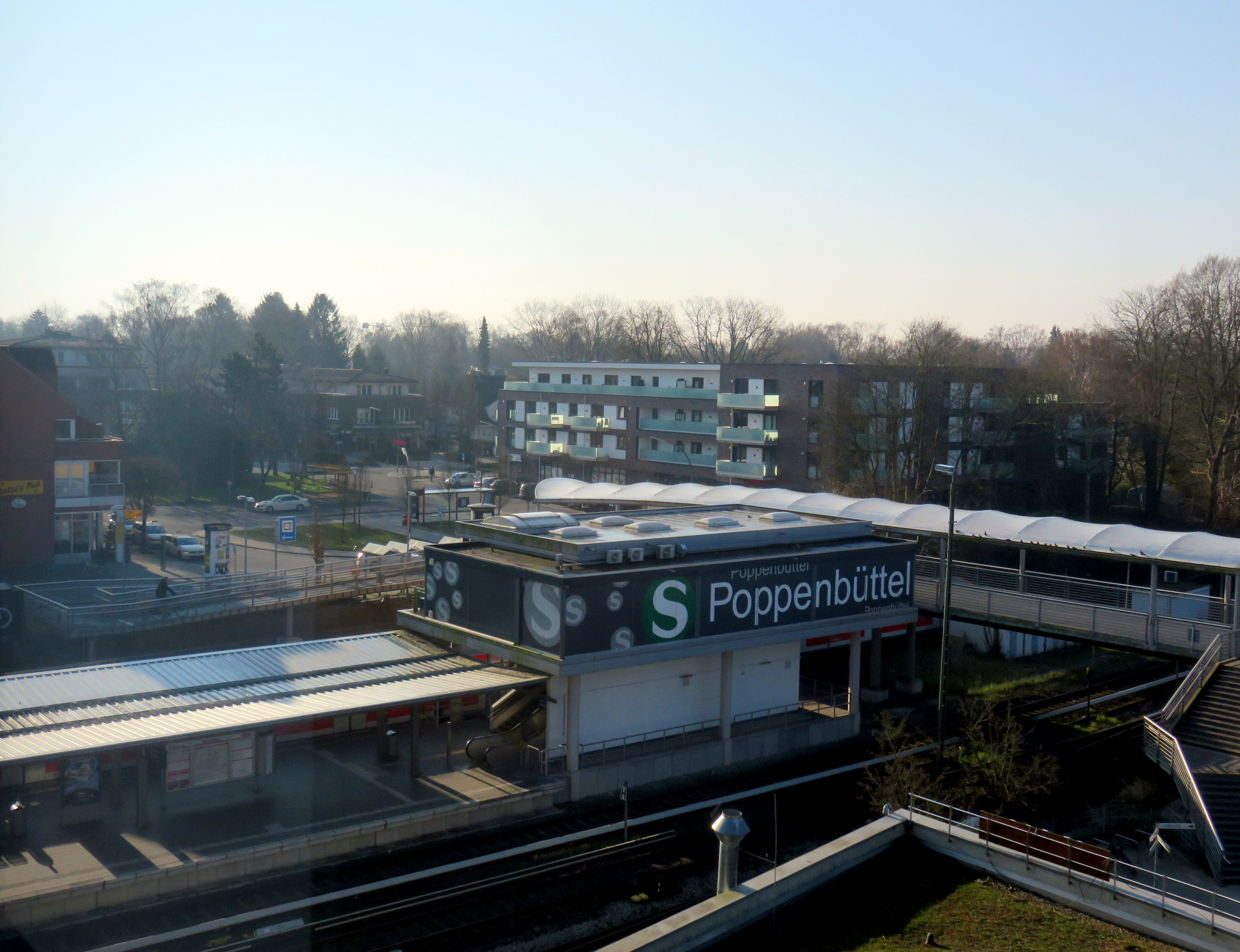
Poppenbüttel station after refurbishment

== Services ==
Poppenbüttel is served by the Hamburg S-Bahn S1 line — starting in the town of Wedel to the west of Hamburg and ending in Poppenbüttel or Hamburg Airport. To achieve this, a standard six-car S1 train, usually consisting of two coupled DB BR 474 units, is divided at Ohlsdorf station. The first three cars continue to Hamburg Airport, whereas the last three cars continue to Poppenbüttel.

During the day, trains run every 10 minutes. To accommodate for high passenger numbers during peak times, additional services are offered. Until the December 2023 timetable change, these services were designated as line S11. As part of the reform of the S-Bahn network that year, they were integrated into line S1.

Trains run 24 hours a day on Saturday and Sunday nights as well as on public holidays. On weekdays, operations rest between midnight and 4:00 a.m.

== Facilities ==
The station consists of a single island-platform, half of which is covered. It is accessible via a footbridge connecting Wentzelplatz, where the bus station is located and the majority of buses depart from, with Stormarnplatz. Both the station and the footbridge are accessible using ramps and lifts.

Ticket machines and a kiosk are located on the footbridge level.

Paid Park+Ride and Bike+Ride facilities are available.

== See also ==
- Hamburg S-Bahn
- List of Hamburg S-Bahn stations
- Hamburger Verkehrsverbund
