= Iserbrook station =

Railway station in Hamburg, Germany

Coordinates: 53.5764°N 9.8145°E

Iserbrook
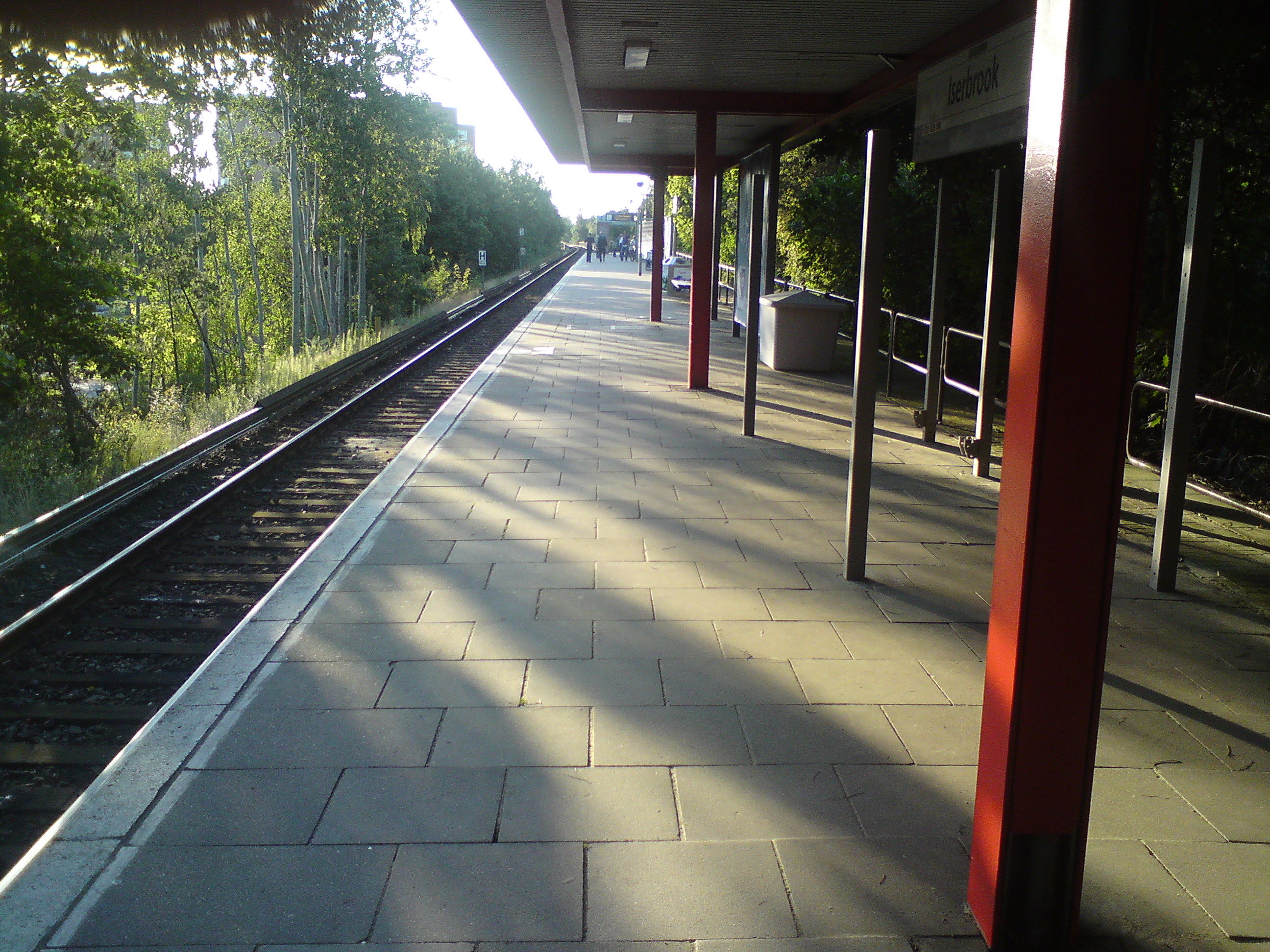
- Iserbrook railway station (in 2009)

General information
- Location: Hasenhöhe 162; 22589 Hamburg; Germany
- Line: Hamburg S-Bahn S1
- Platforms: 1
- Tracks: 1
- Connections: Bus stop

Construction
- Structure type: Elevated
- Cycle facilities: 90

Other information
- Station code: ds100: AIS; DB station code: 3005; Type: Hp; Category: 6
- Fare zone: HVV: B/301

History
- Opened: 31 October 1950; 75 years ago
- Rebuilt: 18 May 1978; 48 years ago
- Electrified: at opening; 1200 volts DC system, 3rd rail

Services
Preceding station	Hamburg S-Bahn	Following station
Sülldorf towards Wedel	S1	Blankenese towards Poppenbüttel or Hamburg Airport
Location
- Location within Hamburg Location within Schleswig-Holstein Location within Germany Location within Europe

Iserbrook railway station in Hamburg, Germany, is located on the extended Altona-Blankenese line and is served by the trains of the Hamburg S-Bahn.

The rapid transit trains of the line S1 of the Hamburg S-Bahn call the station on the border of the quarters Iserbrook (north of the track) and Sülldorf (south of the track) of the Altona borough in Hamburg.

== History ==
The steam railway line to Wedel itself had been established in 1883, but there was no need for a station in Iserbrook at that time, as settlement in the area did not start until the 1910s and 20s. After the Second World War, many refugees from Hamburg city lived in Nissen huts in the quarter and first major apartment buildings were built, so there was an increased demand for a train stop. The station opened on 31 October 1950, few months after the electrification of the railway line was extended to Sülldorf, later to Wedel. On 18 May 1978 a new station opened south of the old one, which was demolished afterwards.

== Station layout ==
The station is an elevated station with a platform and 1 track. It is the only S-Bahn station in Hamburg with one track. The station is unstaffed but an SOS and information telephone is available. There are 90 places to lock a bicycle, as well as a few parking spots. The station is not fully accessible for handicapped persons, because there is no lift, but there is a ramp, which can be used by handicapped persons with help. There are no lockerboxes.

== Services ==
The trains in direction Blankenese and Wedel use the single track in both directions. A bus stop in front of the railway station is called by bus line 285.

== See also ==
- Hamburger Verkehrsverbund (HVV) (Public transport association in Hamburg)
