= Othmarschen station =

Railway station in Hamburg, Germany

Othmarschen
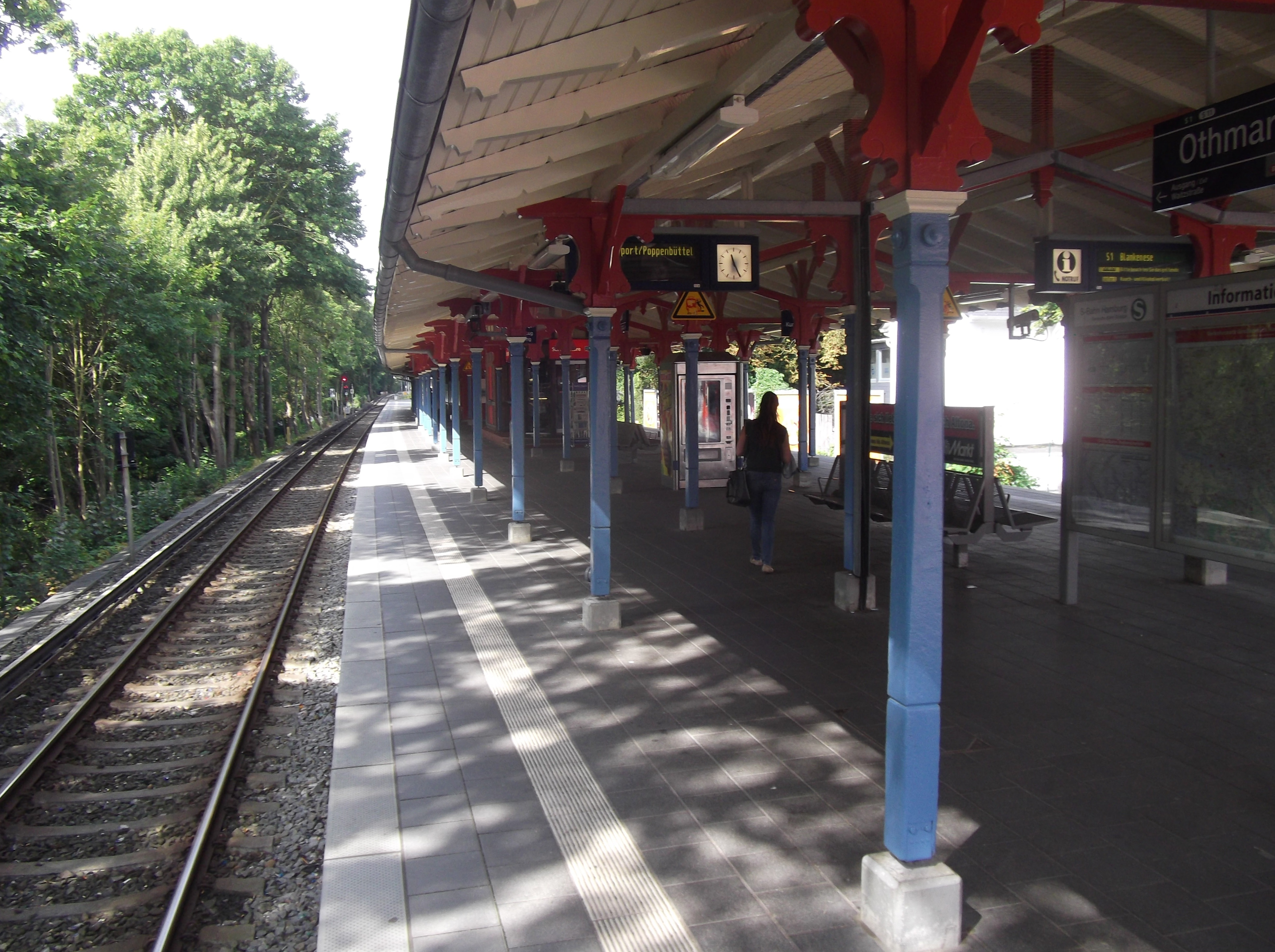

General information
- Location: Statthalterplatz; 22607 Hamburg, Germany
- Coordinates: 53°33′33″N 9°53′12″E
- Line: S1
- Platforms: 1 island platform
- Tracks: 2
- Connections: Bus station

Construction
- Structure type: At grade
- Parking: None
- Cycle facilities: 20

Other information
- Station code: ds100: AOH; DB station code: 4817; Type: Bf; Category: 4
- Fare zone: HVV: A/201

History
- Opened: 1 August 1882; 144 years ago
- Rebuilt: 1897
- Electrified: 29 January 1908; 118 years ago, 6.3 kV AC system (overhead; turned off in 1955); 15 July 1940; 86 years ago, 1.2 kV DC system (3rd rail)
- Former names: 1882-1938 Groß Flottbeck-Othmarschen

Services
Preceding station	Hamburg S-Bahn	Following station
Klein Flottbek towards Wedel	S1	Bahrenfeld towards Poppenbüttel or Hamburg Airport
Location
- Location within Hamburg Location within Schleswig-Holstein Location within Germany Location within Europe

Othmarschen railway station is on the Altona-Blankenese line and served by the city trains, located in Hamburg, Germany. The station was opened in 1897. The rapid transit trains of the line S1 of the Hamburg S-Bahn calls the station in the quarter Othmarschen of the Altona borough. Right along the railway tracks is the border to the quarter Groß Flottbek.

== History ==
In 1858 planning for the rail line Altona – Blankenese begun, in 1867 the first trains ran. And in 1882 an Othmarschen stop was built, this stop was to the west of today's station. In 1897, with the development of the double tracked line, the current Othmarschen station was opened. The station is listed as a cultural heritage building.

== Station layout ==
The station is elevated with a gabled roof supported by wooden columns. The connecting struts and the columns are decorated. On the platform are a small shop, a passenger shelter, and a shelter for the lineman preserved. The station is an island platform and 2 tracks. In direction Wedel is a separated track siding to reverse the train direction, if necessary. The station is unstaffed but an emergency call and information telephone is available. There are about 20 places to lock a bicycle. There are no lockerboxes.

A small shop in the station sells newspapers and snacks. There is also a kebab shop serving food most hours of the day and evening. A shopping street is close to the station, with a supermarket and several banks with ATM facilities.

== Services ==
On track no. 1 the trains in direction Blankenese and Wedel and on track no. 2 the trains in direction Hamburg center call the station. A bus station in front of the railway station is used by several bus lines.

== Visitors to DESY ==
Othmarschen station receives many hundreds of visitors a year from other parts of Germany and numerous countries abroad, as it is the nearest S-Bahn station to the DESY synchrotron laboratory. The bus service from the station to the labs is frequent and excellent, running late into the night including at weekends.

== See also ==
- Hamburger Verkehrsverbund
