= Bahrenfeld station =

Railway station in Hamburg, Germany

Bahrenfeld
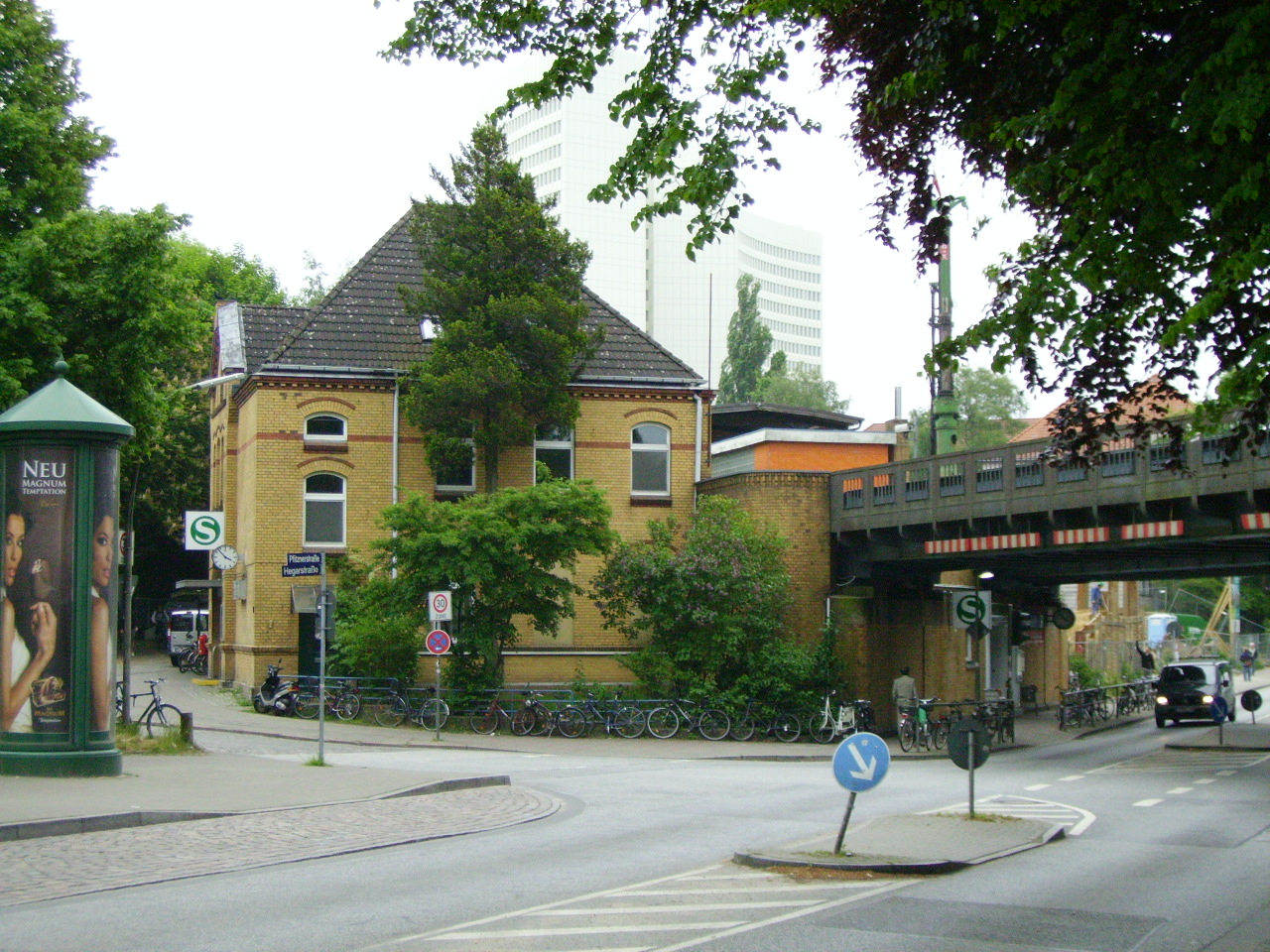
- Bahrenfeld railway station outside view in 2008

General information
- Location: Hegarstraße 1; 22761 Hamburg, Germany
- Coordinates: 53°33′36″N 9°54′41″E
- Line: S1
- Platforms: 1 island platform
- Tracks: 2
- Connections: Bus

Construction
- Structure type: Elevated
- Parking: Park and ride (251 slots)
- Accessible: Yes

Other information
- Station code: ds100: ABAF; DB station code: 0376; Type: Bf; Category: 4
- Fare zone: HVV: A/101 and 201

History
- Opened: 19 May 1867; 159 years ago
- Electrified: 29 January 1908; 118 years ago, 6.3 kV AC system (overhead; turned off in 1955); 15 July 1940; 86 years ago, 1.2 kV DC system (3rd rail)

Services
Preceding station	Hamburg S-Bahn	Following station
Othmarschen towards Wedel	S1	Ottensen towards Poppenbüttel or Hamburg Airport
Location
- Location within Hamburg Location within Schleswig-Holstein Location within Germany Location within Europe

Bahrenfeld station is on the Altona-Blankenese line and serviced by the city trains, located in Hamburg, Germany in the quarter Bahrenfeld of the Altona borough.

Right along the railway tracks is the border to the quarters Ottensen and Othmarschen.

== History ==
The original station on the Altona-Blankeneser Eisenbahn was built by the Altona-Kieler Eisenbahn-Gesellschaft (AKE). On 19 May 1867 it was initially opened as a single-track stop. On 1 March 1883 the AKE lines were taken over by the Prussian state. In the 1890s, the line was subsequently raised and double-tracked. In 1896 the new Bahrenfeld train station was opened, the reception building of which is still standing today. The Hamburg-Altona city and suburban railway has operated here since 1908, electrified and without level crossings.

In addition to passenger traffic, the station, located in a designated factory district, also served goods traffic, including a track to the Langenfelde marshalling yard. The Ottensener industrial railway was built to connect these factories and opened on 31 August 1898. It had a roll stand on Borselstrasse, today's Gaußstrasse, southeast of the train station. There, the standard-gauge freight wagons were moved to the narrow-gauge tracks. In 1903 a similar roll stand transfer system was also created on the north side, at Borselstraße II station. The heavy freight traffic led to the station being overloaded until 1920, so that in 1923 the Kruppstraße transfer station with a siding to the Eidelstedt marshalling yard was created in the north. Subsequently, the northern transfer station Borselstraße II was closed. However, its tracks were only dismantled after the Second World War. After the decline of Ottensen's industry in the 1970s, the industrial railway was shut down in 1980. However, there was still the factory connection to the Margarine Union, which operated with its own orange diesel locomotives until the 1980s. In the 2000s, a new building with apartments and businesses was built on the area of the transfer tracks south of the S-Bahn platform.

In 2012/13 an elevator was added in the middle of the S-Bahn platform instead of one (of two) stairs, and the historic platform roof was also renovated. As in Hochkamp, Klein Flottbek and Othmarschen, there was a small station bar on the platform, the vacant building of which was demolished when the platform was redesigned in 2020.

== Location and construction ==
Today it is a double-track S-Bahn station with a central platform in the embankment. It is located parallel to Hegarstraße, to which there is also an exit - as is the case with Friedensallee (formerly Pfitznerstraße here). The former Baf dispatcher interlocking at the eastern end of the platform was built in 1924. With the dismantling of the freight tracks in the 1980s and 1990s, it became superfluous. In addition, switches and light signals of the S-Bahn have been set by the signal box As (Altona S-Bahn) at Altona station since April 1979.

To the north of the S-Bahn tracks there was a pull-out track that ended in front of the station building. There was also a goods shed on the north side (still partly open-air area on Gasstrasse today). The German-American Petroleum Society / Esso, Böttcher and Genser and Conz companies were connected via the tracks there. On the site of the former Esso tank farm at the Bahrenfelder Steindamm / corner of Gasstrasse, Euler-Hermes-Kreditversicherung has built its new building by 2020. There was also a siding to the municipal gas works, today the Otto von Bahrenpark, which is used for trade and events ("gas works"), is located here. The empty bridge over Gasstrasse can still be seen today. The Ottensener industrial railway was connected via the Borselstraße II station further to the east. In its place is now a playground, the Ottensen station has been built since 2019 on the route of the Altona-Blankeneser railway. The freight track to Langenfelde also still exists today. Another track led from the Borselstrasse II station further east, roughly at street level, over the Bahrenfelder Steindamm to a small station there on the Kohlentwiete. Further tracks of the industrial railway also ran from the former Borselstraße II station far north to Langenfelde, some remains of the track can still be seen. The remaining open-air area is reserved by the railway for possible additional parking facilities for S-Bahn extensions (S4 / S32).

== Station layout ==
The station is elevated with an island platform and 2 tracks.

== Station services ==
=== Trains ===
The rapid transit trains of the line S1 of the Hamburg S-Bahn calls the station.

=== Buses ===
In front of the railway station is a bus stop.

=== Facilities ===
A small shop in the station sells fast food and newspapers. There are no lockerboxes and the station is fully accessible for handicapped persons, as there is a lift since 2012. There are about 250 parking places nearby free of charge. No personnel is attending the station.

== See also ==
- List of Hamburg S-Bahn stations
- Hamburger Verkehrsverbund (HVV)
