= Klein Flottbek station =

Railway station in Hamburg, Germany

Klein Flottbek
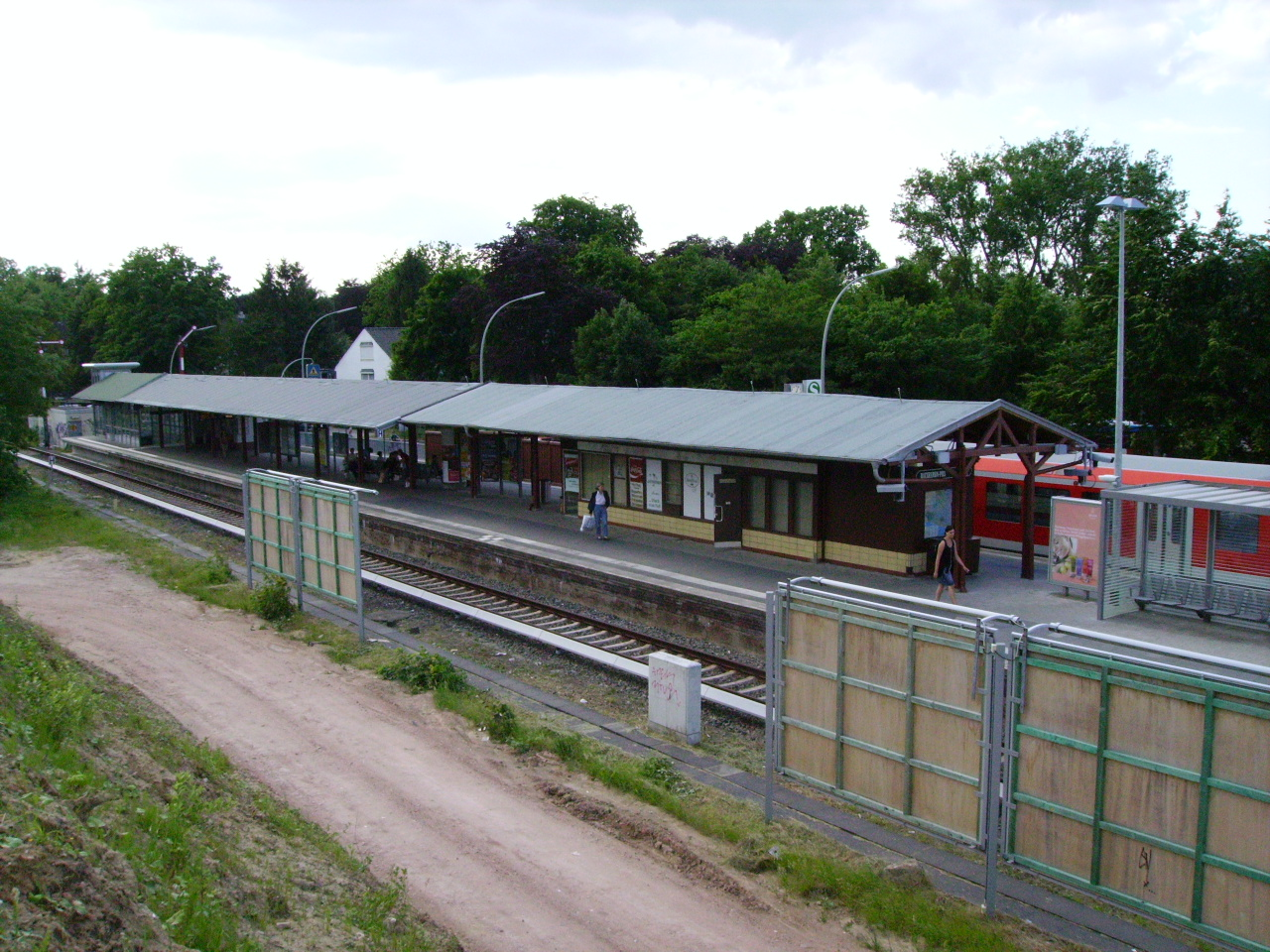
- Klein Flottbek railway station (in 2008)

General information
- Location: Jürgensalle 66, 22609 Hamburg, Germany
- Coordinates: 53°33′29″N 9°51′40″E
- Line: S1
- Platforms: 1
- Tracks: 2
- Connections: Bus station

Construction
- Structure type: At grade
- Parking: Park and ride
- Cycle facilities: 20
- Accessible: yes

Other information
- Station code: DS100: AFB; DB station code: 3229; Type: Bf; Category: 4
- Fare zone: HVV: A/201

History
- Opened: 19 May 1867; 159 years ago
- Electrified: 29 January 1908; 118 years ago, 6.3 kV AC system (overhead; turned off 1955); 15 July 1940; 86 years ago, 1.2 kV DC system (3rd rail)

Services
Preceding station	Hamburg S-Bahn	Following station
Hochkamp towards Wedel	S1	Othmarschen towards Poppenbüttel or Hamburg Airport
Location
- Location within Hamburg Location within Schleswig-Holstein Location within Germany Location within Europe

Klein Flottbek (Botanischer Garten) railway station is on the Altona-Blankenese line and serviced by the Hamburg city trains. Rapid transit trains of line S1 of the Hamburg S-Bahn call at the station in the Klein Flottbek subdistrict in the Nienstedten quarter of Altona borough in Hamburg, Germany. The track forms the border of the Osdorf quarter.

The station is near the main entrance of the Botanischer Garten Hamburg, in Osdorf.

== Station layout ==
The station is an at-grade station with an island platform and 2 tracks. Entrance to the platform is through a pedestrian underpass. The station is unstaffed but an emergency call and information telephone is available. There are about 20 places to lock a bicycle and about 260 park and ride spaces. The station is fully accessible for handicapped persons via a lift. There is a DB Service Store, but no lockers.

== Services ==
The trains travel in the direction of Blankenese and Wedel on track no. 1 and the direction of Hamburg center on track no. 2. A bus station in front of the railway station is used by several bus lines.

== See also ==
- Hamburger Verkehrsverbund (HVV)
