= Hochkamp station =

Railway station in Hamburg, Germany

Hochkamp
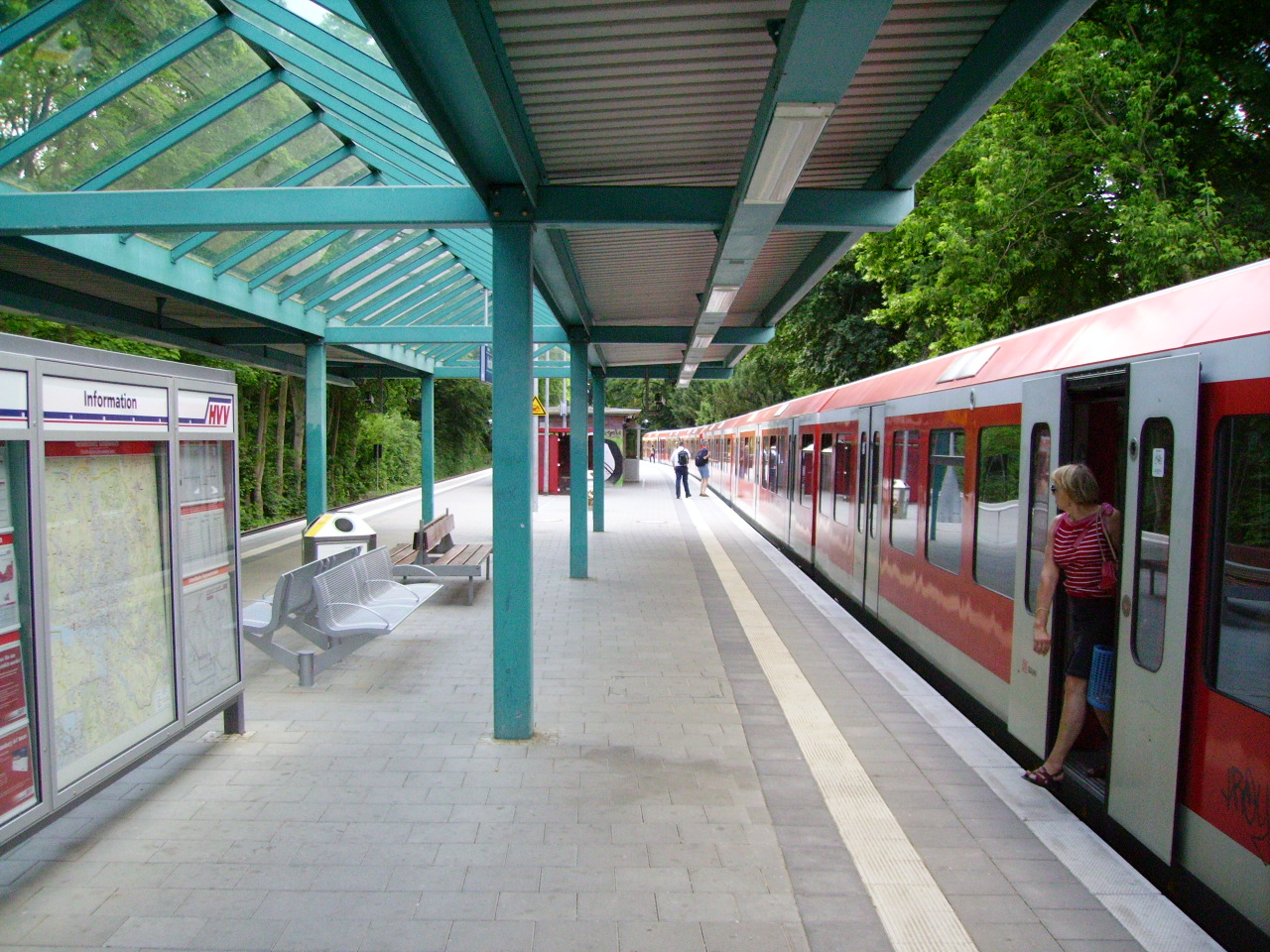
- Hochkamp railway station (in 2008)

General information
- Location: Reichskanzlerstr. 1; 22609 Hamburg; Germany
- Coordinates: 53°33′40″N 9°50′31″E
- Line: S1
- Platforms: 1
- Tracks: 2
- Connections: Bus stop

Construction
- Structure type: Elevated
- Parking: Park and ride
- Cycle facilities: 20
- Accessible: Yes

Other information
- Station code: ds100: AHPS; DB station code: 2803; Type: Hp Bk; Category: 4
- Fare zone: HVV: A and B/201 and 301

History
- Opened: 2 March 1898; 128 years ago
- Electrified: 29 January 1908; 118 years ago, 6.3 kV AC system (overhead; turned off in 1955); 15 July 1940; 86 years ago, 1.2 kV DC system (3rd rail)

Services
| Preceding station | Hamburg S-Bahn | Following station |
|---|---|---|
| Blankenese towards Wedel | S1 | Klein Flottbek towards Poppenbüttel or Hamburg Airport |
Location
- Location within Hamburg Location within Schleswig-Holstein Location within Germany Location within Europe

Hochkamp (German pronunciation: [ˈhoːxkamp]) railway station is on the Altona-Blankenese line and served by the city trains, located in Hamburg, Germany.

The rapid transit trains of the line S1 of the Hamburg S-Bahn call at the station in the quarter Nienstedten of the Altona borough in Hamburg. Right along the railway tracks is the border to the quarter Osdorf. Hochkamp is a planned village (around 1900) with large lots and expensive houses.

== Station layout ==
The station is an elevated station with an island platform and 2 tracks. The station is unstaffed but an SOS and information telephone is available. There are about 20 places to lock a bicycle and about 70 park and ride places. The station is fully accessible for handicapped persons, because there is a lift. There are no lockerboxes.

== Services ==
On track no. 1 the trains in direction Blankenese and Wedel and on track no. 2 the trains in direction Hamburg center and toward Poppenbüttel call the station. A bus stop in front of the railway station is called by a bus line.

== See also ==
- Hamburger Verkehrsverbund (HVV) (Public transport association in Hamburg)
