= Sülldorf station =

Railway station in Hamburg, Germany

Coordinates: 53.5811°N 9.7976°E

Sülldorf
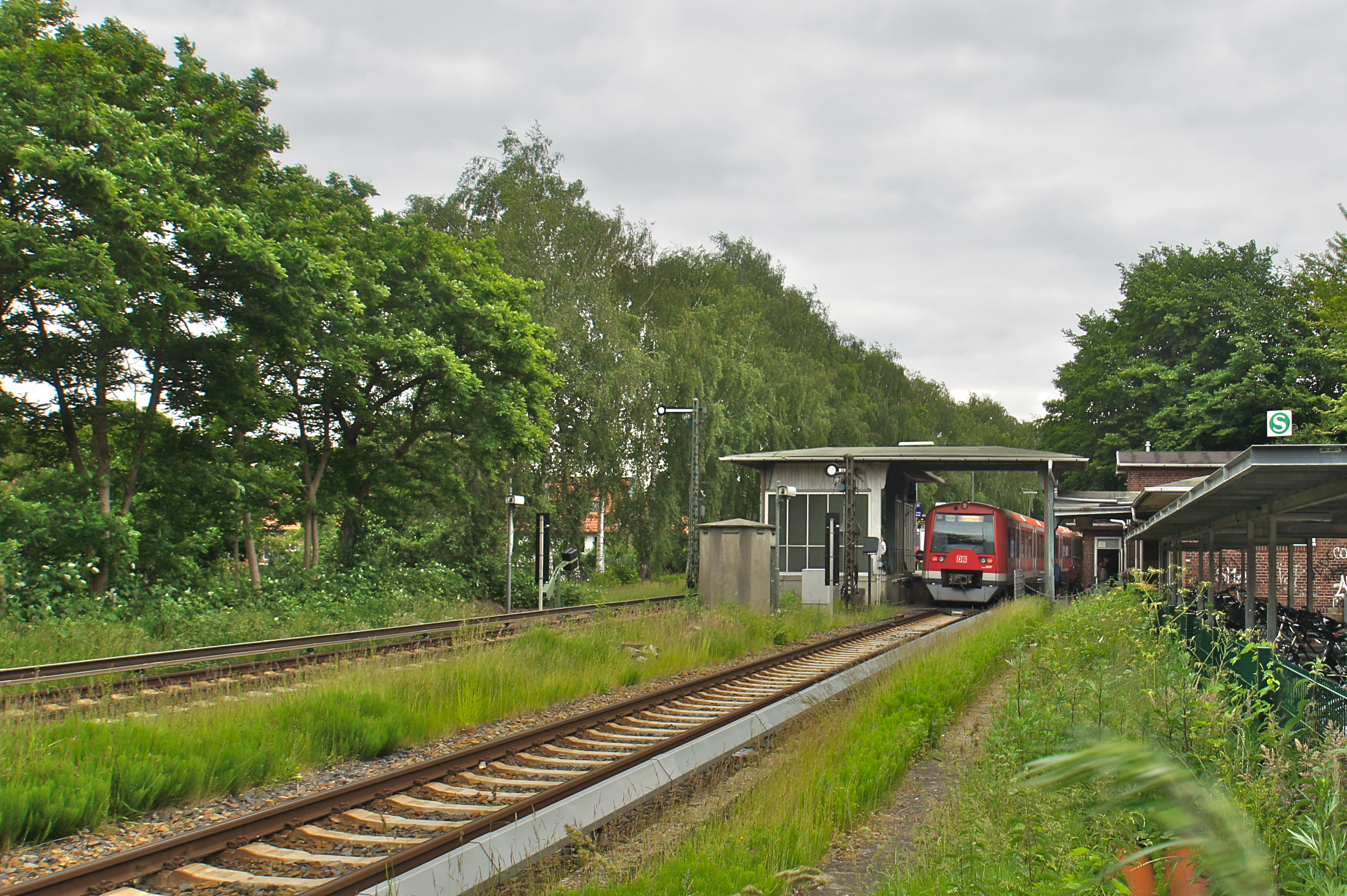
- Sülldorf railway station (in 2012)

General information
- Other names: Hamburg-Sülldorf
- Location: Sülldorfer Kirchenweg 206; 22589 Hamburg; Germany
- Line: Hamburg S-Bahn S1
- Platforms: 1
- Tracks: 2
- Connections: Bus stop

Construction
- Structure type: At grade
- Cycle facilities: yes

Other information
- Station code: ds100: ASDF; DB station code: 6105; Type: Bf; Category: 5
- Fare zone: HVV: B/301 and 401

History
- Opened: 1 December 1883; 142 years ago
- Electrified: 31 October 1950; 75 years ago, 1.2 kV DC system (3rd rail)
- Former names: 1883-1930 Sülldorf; 1930-1938 Altona-Sülldorf; 1938 to date Hamburg-Sülldorf

Services
Preceding station	Hamburg S-Bahn	Following station
Rissen towards Wedel	S1	Iserbrook towards Poppenbüttel or Hamburg Airport
Location
- Location within Hamburg Location within Schleswig-Holstein Location within Germany Location within Europe

Sülldorf railway station in Hamburg, Germany, is located on the extended Altona-Blankenese line and is served by the trains of the Hamburg S-Bahn.

The rapid transit trains of the line S1 of the Hamburg S-Bahn call the station in the Sülldorf quarter of the Altona borough in Hamburg.

== History ==
When the steam railway line to Wedel was opened on 1 December 1883, also a station in the small farmer's village of Sülldorf was established. It was then also used for freight traffic and had 3 tracks. After electrification of the line to Sülldorf, which was completed on 14 May 1950, the third track north of the station was removed. The platform was fully renovated in 2013.

== Station layout ==
The station is an at-grade station with an island platform and 2 tracks. It is the only S-Bahn station in Hamburg which can only be accessed over a pedestrian level crossing. Next to it the smallest semaphore of Hamburg can be found. Also there is still the mechanical signal box called "Sdf" in operation, which was built in 1927. The station is unstaffed but an SOS and information telephone is available. There are some places to lock a bicycle as well as a few parking spots. The station is fully accessible for handicapped persons. There are no lockerboxes.

== Services ==
On track no. 1 the trains in direction Wedel and on track no. 2 the trains in direction Hamburg center and toward Airport/Poppenbüttel call the station. A bus stop in front of the railway station is called by metro bus line 1 and night bus lines 601 and 621.

== See also ==
- Hamburger Verkehrsverbund (HVV) (Public transport association in Hamburg)
