= Rissen station =

Railway station in Hamburg, Germany

Coordinates: 53.5832°N 9.7573°E

Rissen
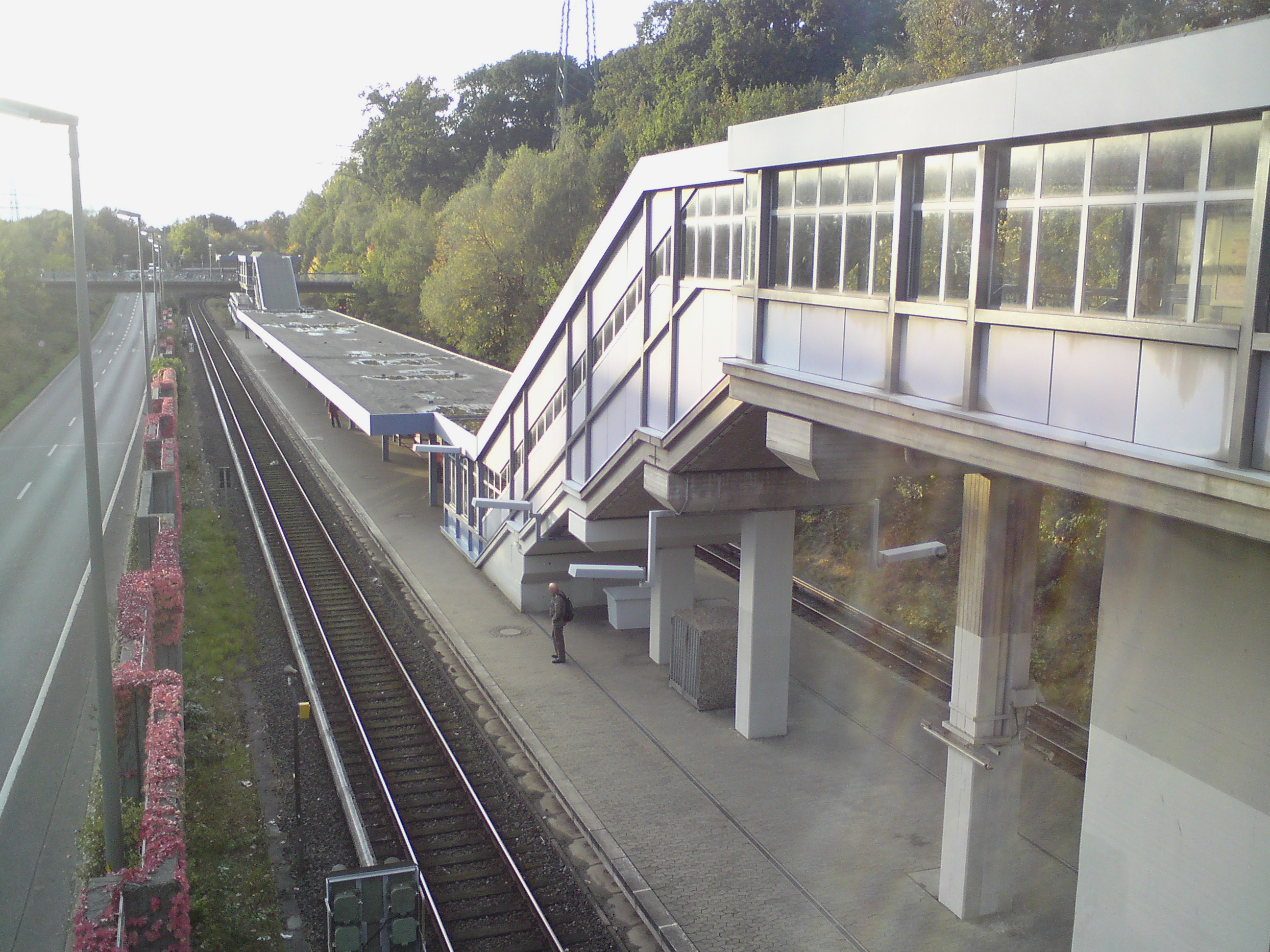
- Rissen railway station (in 2009)

General information
- Other names: Hamburg-Rissen
- Location: Am Rissener Bahnhof 1; 22589 Hamburg; Germany
- Line: Hamburg S-Bahn S1
- Platforms: 1
- Tracks: 2
- Connections: Bus stop

Construction
- Structure type: Terrain cutting
- Cycle facilities: yes

Other information
- Station code: ds100: ARI; DB station code: 5291; Type: Hp Üst; Category: 5
- Fare zone: HVV: B/401
- Website: www.bahnhof.de

History
- Opened: 1 December 1883; 142 years ago
- Rebuilt: May 1983
- Electrified: 20 May 1954; 72 years ago, 1.2 kV DC system (3rd rail)
- Former names: 1883-1930 Rissen; 1930-1938 Altona-Rissen; 1938 to date Hamburg-Rissen

Services
Preceding station	Hamburg S-Bahn	Following station
Wedel Terminus	S1	Sülldorf towards Poppenbüttel or Hamburg Airport
Location
- Location within Hamburg Location within Germany Location within Europe

Rissen railway station in Hamburg, Germany, is located on the extended Altona-Blankenese line and is served by the trains of the Hamburg S-Bahn.

The rapid transit trains of the line S1 of the Hamburg S-Bahn call the station in the Rissen quarter of the Hamburg borough of Altona.

== History ==
When the steam railway line to Wedel was opened on 1 December 1883, also a station in the small village of Rissen was established. It was then also used for freight traffic and had 3 tracks, the third of which was a siding south of the two platform tracks, which was later removed. Electrification of the line to Wedel was completed on 20 May 1954. In May 1983 the new Rissen station opened next to the new Bundesstraße (federal road) 431 in a terrain cutting soon dubbed by the inhabitants as "Rissen Canyon". The old station, a small building similar to the Sülldorf station, had to be demolished afterwards in order to complete the cutting with the new federal road.

== Station layout ==
The station is situated in a terrain cutting with an island platform and 2 tracks. The station is unstaffed but an SOS and information telephone is available. There are some places to lock a bicycle as well as a few parking spots. The station is fully accessible for handicapped persons, as there is a lift and a ramp. Also a public toilet and a taxi stand can be found near the station. There are no lockerboxes.

== Services ==
On track no. 1 the trains in direction Wedel and on track no. 2 the trains in direction Hamburg center and toward Airport/Poppenbüttel call the station. A bus stop in front of the railway station is called by metro bus line 1, the nearby bus stop of Rissener Dorfstraße also by line 286 and night bus lines 601 and 621.

== Gallery ==
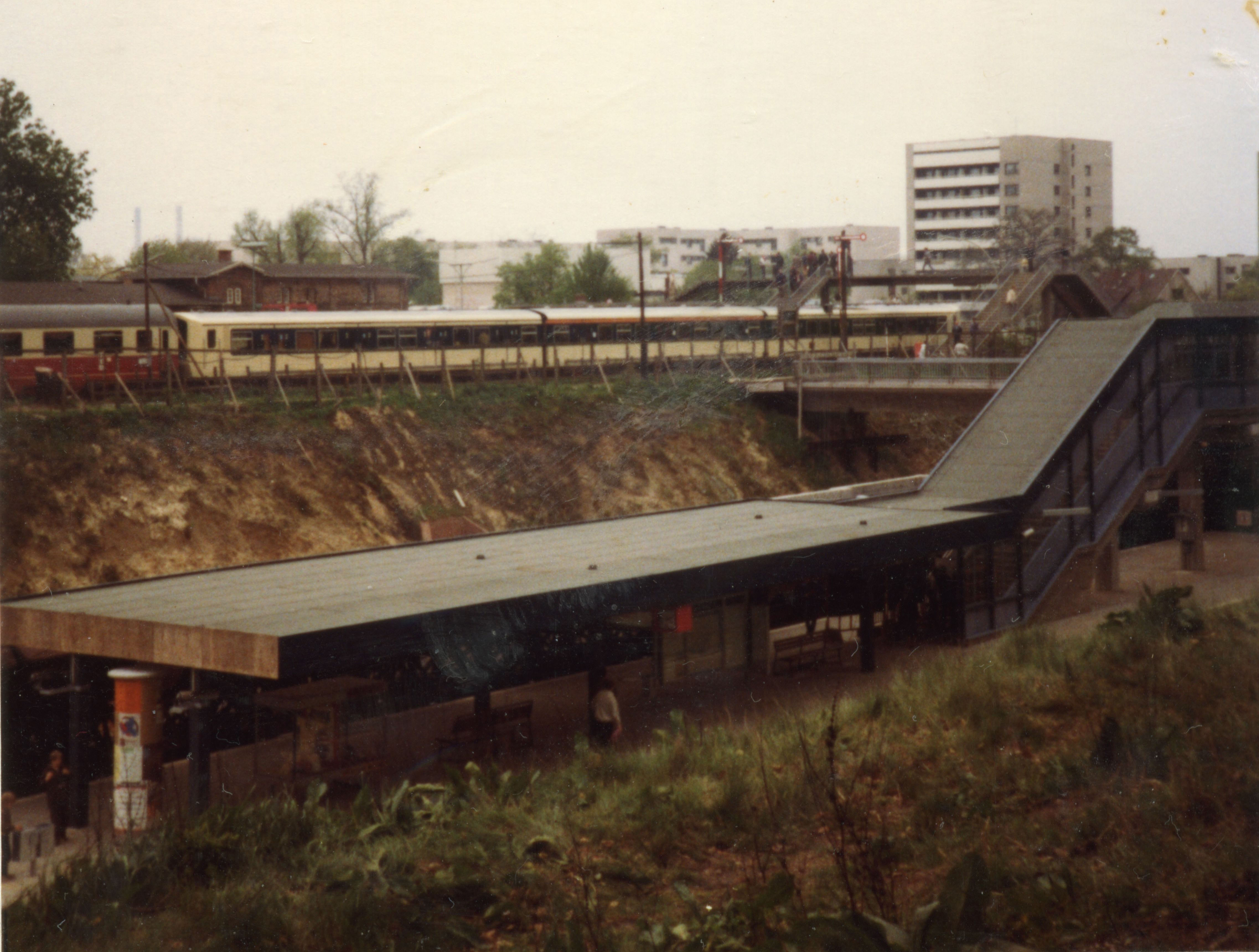
Old and new Rissen station in May 1983

== See also ==
- Hamburger Verkehrsverbund (HVV) (Public transport association in Hamburg)
