= Blankenese station =

Railway station in Hamburg, Germany

Blankenese
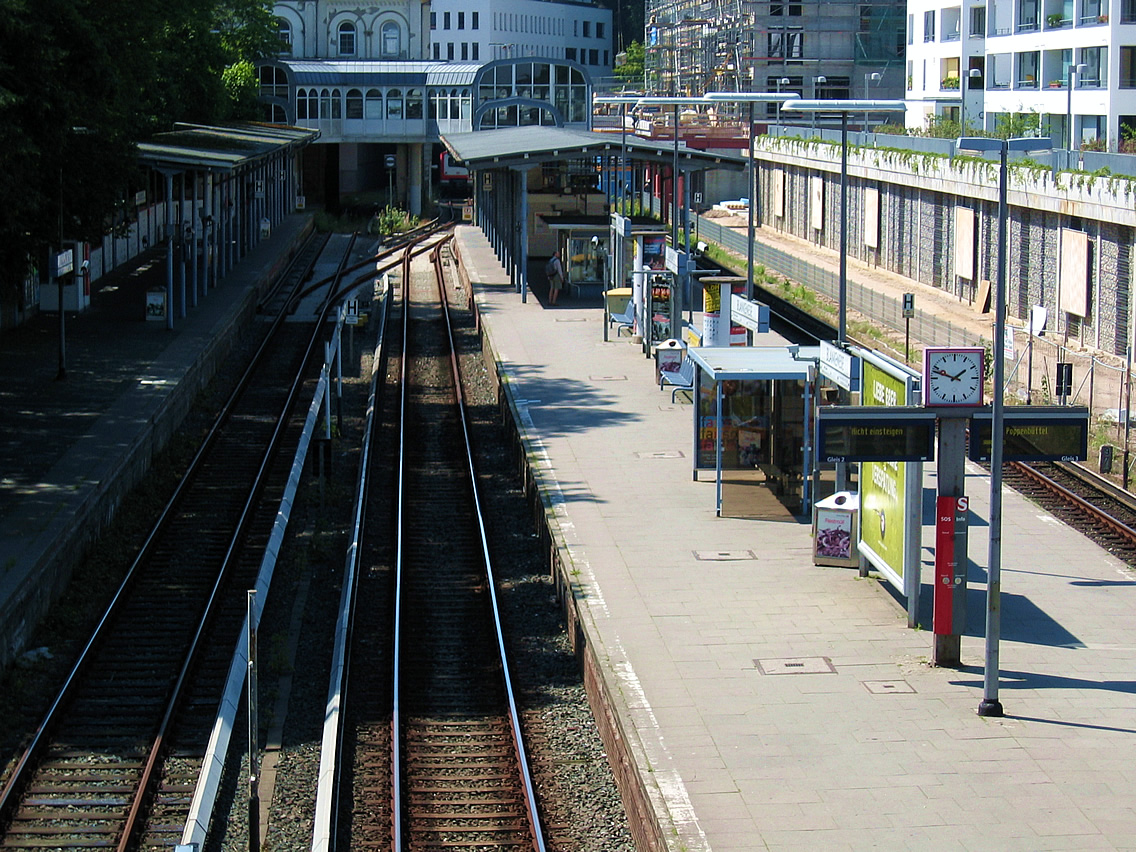

General information
- Other names: Hamburg-Blankenese
- Location: Erik-Blumenfeld-Platz; Blankenese, Hamburg; Germany
- Coordinates: 53°33′51″N 9°48′51″E
- Line: S1

Construction
- Structure type: Below grade

Other information
- Station code: 0687
- DS100 code: AB
- Category: 4
- Fare zone: HVV: B/301

History
- Opened: 19 May 1867; 159 years ago
- Electrified: 29 January 1908; 118 years ago, 6.3 kV AC system (overhead; turned off in 1955); 15 July 1940; 86 years ago, 1.2 kV DC system (3rd rail)
- Former names: 1867–1930 Blankenese; 1930–1938 Altona-Blankenese since 1938 Hamburg-Blankenese

Services
Preceding station	Hamburg S-Bahn	Following station
Iserbrook towards Wedel	S1	Hochkamp towards Poppenbüttel or Hamburg Airport
Location

Blankenese is a railway station on the Altona-Blankenese line, part of the Hamburg S-Bahn, located in the suburb of Blankenese in the borough of Altona, Hamburg, Germany.

The station opened in 1867, and is a heritage site. It is a terminus, meaning the trains have to reverse their direction.

== See also ==
- Hamburger Verkehrsverbund
- List of Hamburg S-Bahn stations
