= Altona–Blankenese railway =

Railway line in Germany

Altona-Blankenese railway
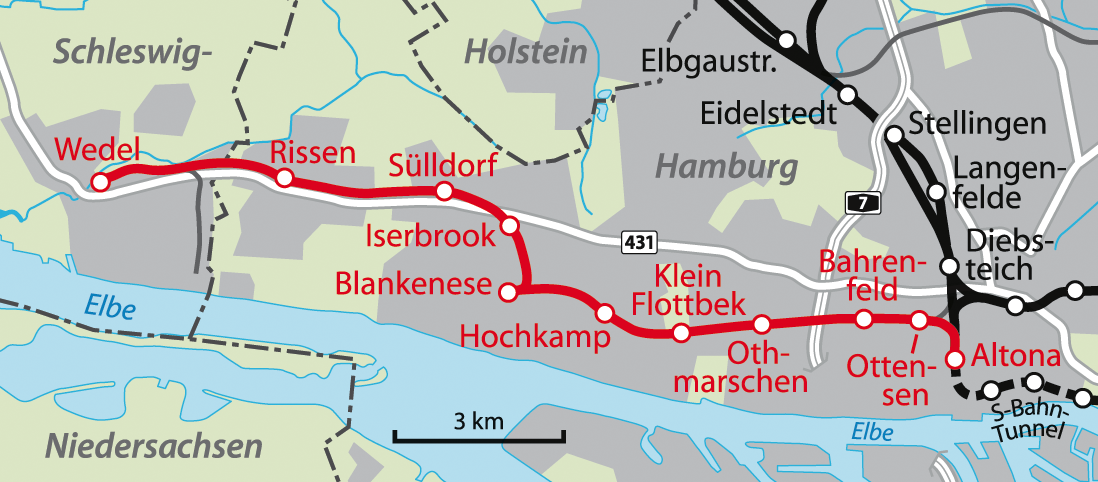

Overview
- Line number: 1224, 1226
- Locale: Hamburg and Schleswig-Holstein, Germany

Service
- Route number: 101.1, 101.11

Technical
- Line length: 18.0 km (11.2 mi)
- Track gauge: 1,435 mm (4 ft 8 1/2 in) standard gauge
- Electrification: 1200 V DC

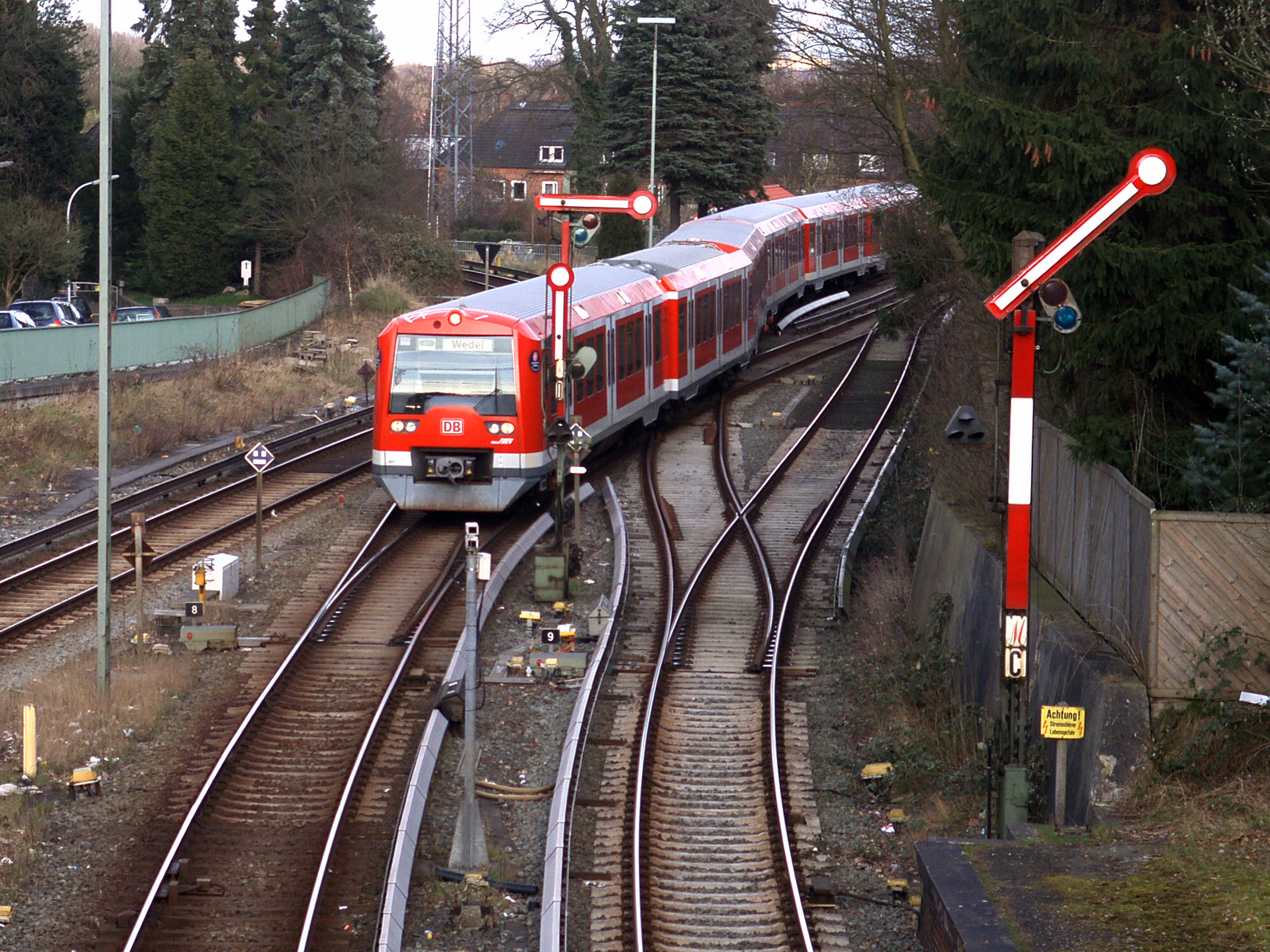
Class 474 train at the entrance to Blankenese station

The Altona–Blankenese railway is a railway line to the west of Hamburg. It starts at the Altona station and runs through Othmarschen to Blankenese station. This section of line was opened in 1867. 16 years later the line was extended to Wedel. It is now used by the S1 line of the Hamburg S-Bahn and was part of the first electrified suburban railway in Germany.

== Route ==
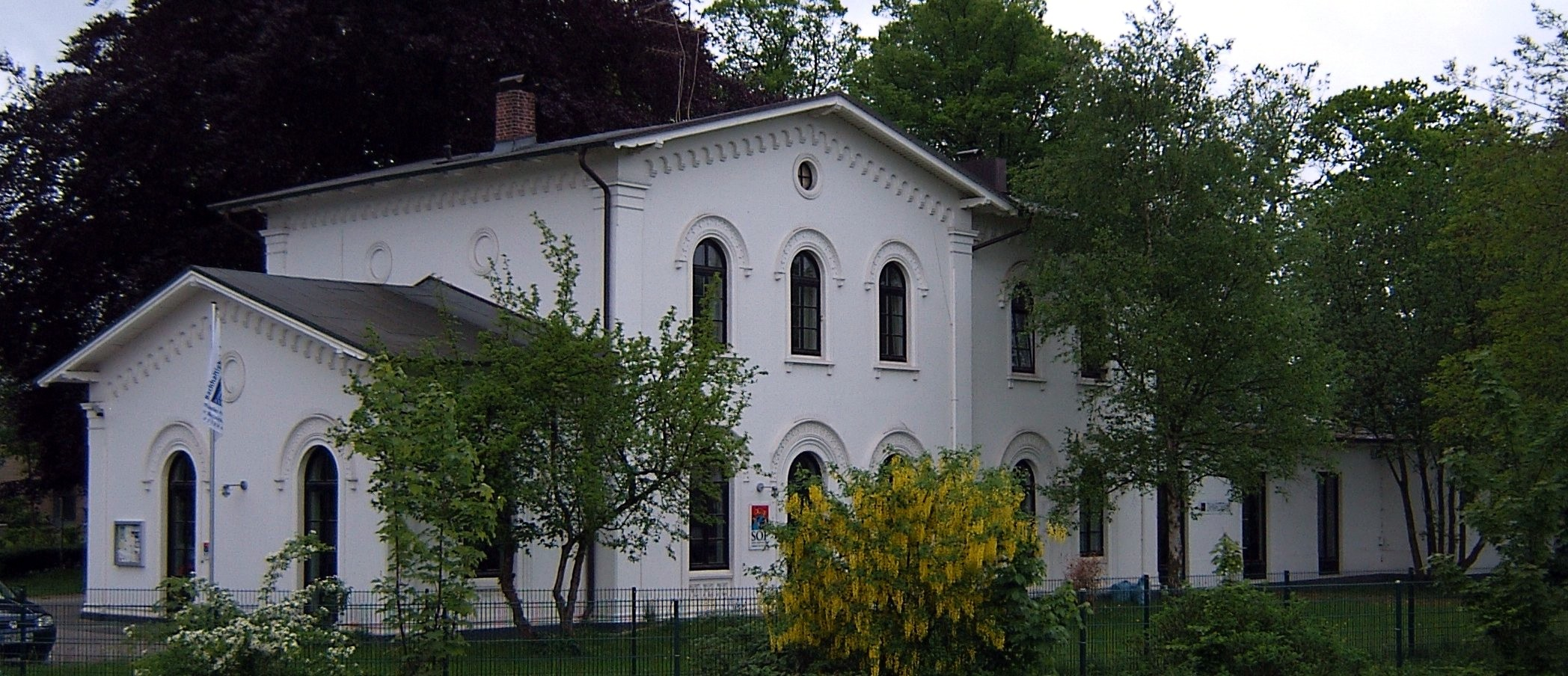
Former station building in Klein Flottbek

The line begins at Altona station, where there is a four-track underground S-Bahn station, which has an attached reversing facility. The City S-Bahn line runs up a steep ramp (with a maximum gradient of 4.0%) to the surface and shortly later the Altona–Blankenese line branches off the line to Pinneberg and turns west. It passes through the stations of Bahrenfeld, Othmarschen, Klein Flottbek and Hochkamp and then runs into the three-track terminal station of Blankenese.

Like the line from Hamburg, the Blankenese-Wedel extension is connected to the eastern end of the station, so trains have to reverse out of the station to continue their journey. The line then runs to the stations of Iserbrook, Sülldorf, Rissen and finally, the terminus at Wedel. Unlike the section east of Blankenese, the extension to Wedel is mostly single track.

== History ==
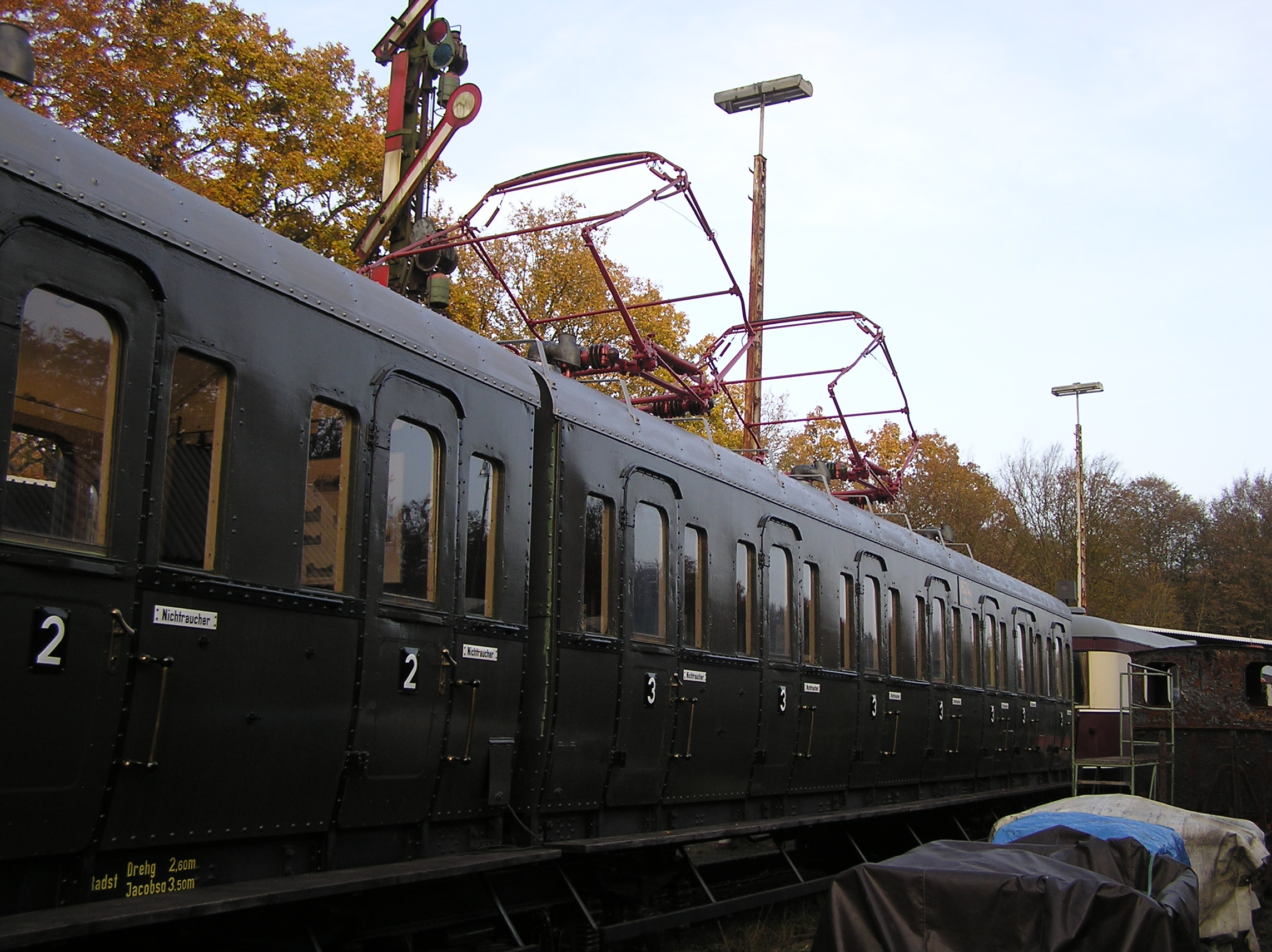
Multiple unit ElT1624, which was used on the Blankenese-Altona–Hauptbahnhof-Barmbek-Olsdorf line during the period of operation with catenary between 1927 and 1955

The line was opened on 19 May 1867 between Altona and Blankenese, although the only intermediate stations opened at that time were at Klein Flottbek and Bahrenfeld. The Othmarschen station was opened on 1 August 1882 with the development of the villa estate (German: Villenkolonien) of Othmarschen. Hochkamp station was built later.

On 1 December 1883, the extension was opened from Blankenese to Wedel. Extension of the line onwards from Blankenese station would have required a tunnel. Instead the station was built as a terminal station. Between 1911 and 1914 the Blankenese–Marienhöhe Trackless Railway (Gleislose Bahn Blankenese–Marienhöhe), an early trolleybus operation, ran from Blankenese station.

The Altona–Blankenese section, which had been duplicated by 1900, became part of the network of the Hamburg-Altona Urban and Suburban Railway (Hamburg-Altonaer Stadt- und Vorortbahn) on its establishment in 1906. In 1907 the line was electrified with overhead wires at 6.3 kV 25 Hz alternating current. It was the first electrified suburban railway in Germany. In 1934, the Urban and Suburban Railway was renamed the S-Bahn and converted to direct current operations, using side-contact third rail and a voltage of 1.2 kV. Because of Second World War, the conversion took place in two stages in 1940 and 1955. During this period, electrification was extended on the Blankenese line, initially, on 14 May 1950, from Blankenese to Sülldorf, with steam trains continuing to Wedel. A few months later, on 31 October 1950, Iserbrook station opened. On 20 May 1954, electrification was extended to Wedel.

The entire length of the line is now served by S-Bahn line S1. In addition S11 services operate from Altona to Blankenese during the peak hour. S1 trains are mainly operated with class 474 Electric multiple units, S11 are operated with class 472 EMUs.

=== Freight ===
Until 1997 a little freight was carried on the line. The freight tracks at Klein Flottbek and Blankenese stations are now completely run down. There used to be a siding from near Bahrenfeld station to a gas works. Sidings also connected to the Ottensen industrial railway and the Unilever margarine factory, using the Rollbock system. The Ölweiche siding used to connect to the Wedel Power Station.
