= Iserbrook =

- Quarter of Hamburg
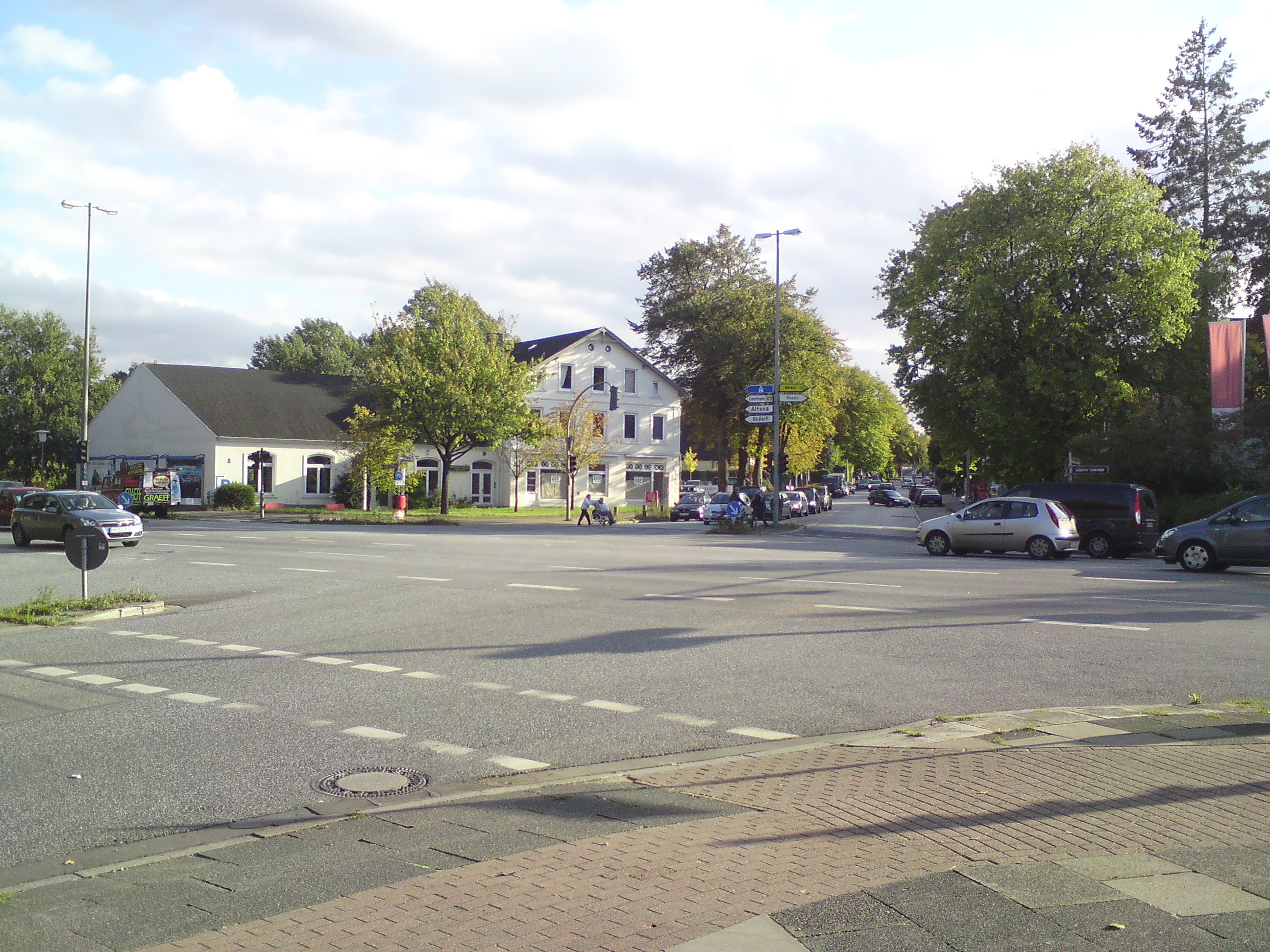

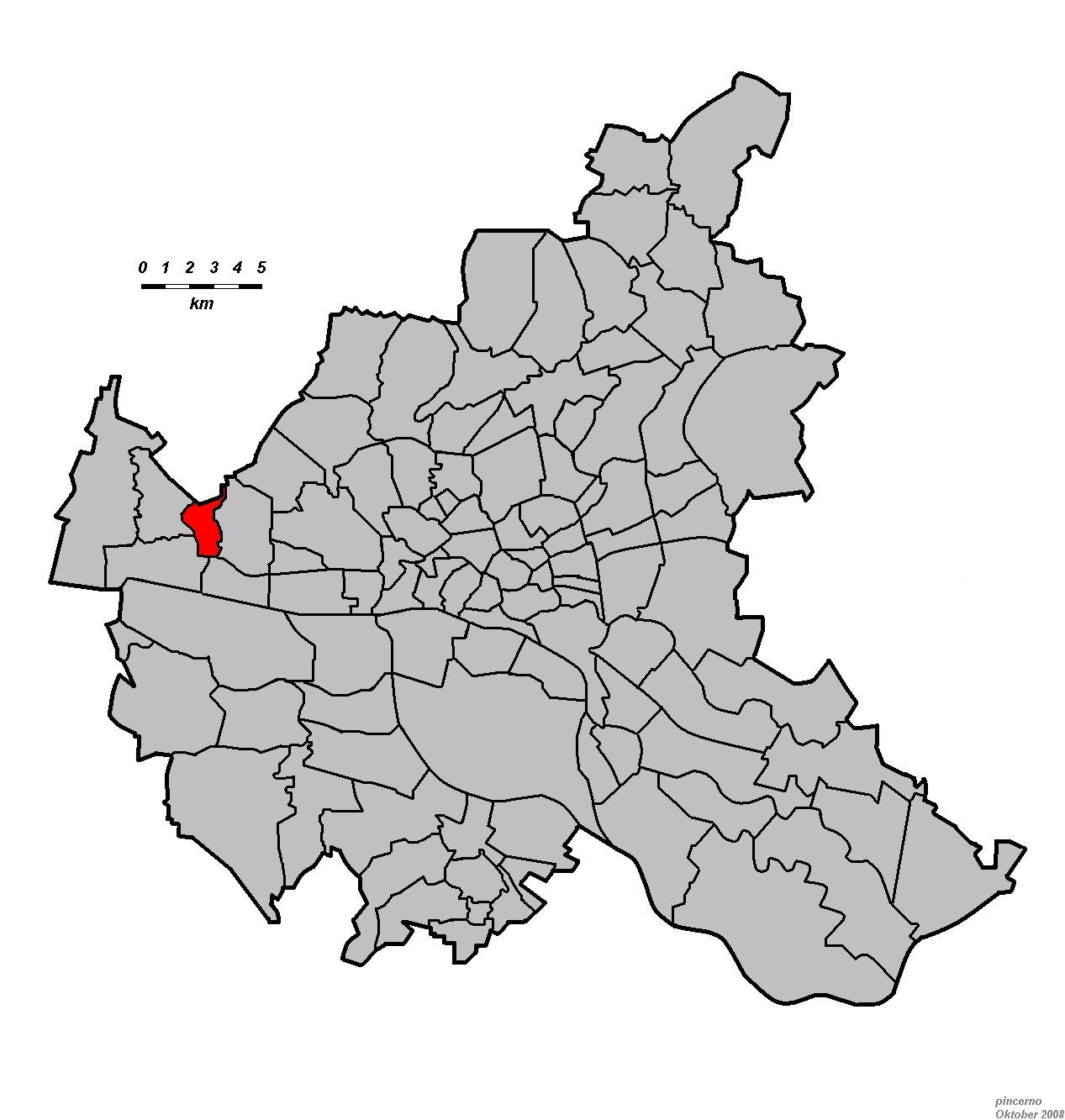
- Location of Iserbrook in the city of Hamburg
- Interactive map of Iserbrook
- Location within Germany Location within Hamburg
- Coordinates: 53°34′35″N 9°49′24″E
- Country: Germany
- State: Hamburg
- City: Hamburg
- Borough: Altona, Hamburg

Area
  - Total: 2.7 km^{2} (1.0 sq mi)

Population (2024-12-31)
  - Total: 11,523
  - Density: 4,300/km^{2} (11,000/sq mi)
- Time zone: UTC+01:00 (CET)
  - Summer (DST): UTC+02:00 (CEST)
- Postal codes: 22589
- Dialling codes: 040
- Vehicle registration: HH

Iserbrook (German pronunciation: [ˈiːzɐbʁoːk]) is a district in the borough of Altona within the Free and Hanseatic City of Hamburg in North Germany. In 2020 its population was 11,352. Iserbrook belongs to the Elbvororte (suburbs that are near the river Elbe on the western part of Hamburg).

== Geography ==
According to the statistical office of Hamburg and Schleswig-Holstein, the district of Iserbook has a total area of 2.7 km^{2}.

The western border connects to the district of Sülldorf. In the East is the district of Osdorf and to the North Iserbrook borders the state of Schleswig-Holstein and the town of Schenefeld. The southern border connects to the district of Blankenese and Nienstedten.

== Demographics ==
In 2007, 10,660 people were living in Iserbrook. Therefore, the population density was 3,998 people per km^{2}. Of the population, 16.8% were children under the age of 18, and 26.5% were 65 years of age or older. 283 people were registered as unemployed (<2%), 10% of those being under the age of 25.

In 1999 there were 5,370 households, out of which 19% had children under the age of 18 living with them and more than 40% of all households were made up of individuals. The average household size was less than 2.

In 2007, there were 538 criminal offences. With 50 crimes per 1,000 people Iserbook is among the lowest rates of all districts in Hamburg where the average is 136 crimes per 1,000 people.

== Education ==
In 2008, there were no secondary schools and two elementary schools in Iserbrook.

== Politics ==
These are the results of Iserbrook in the Hamburg state election:

	SPD	Greens	CDU	Left	AfD	FDP	Others
2020	43,0 %	22,8 %	10,9 %	7,7 %	5,2 %	4,9 %	5,5 %
2015	53,5 %	11,1 %	12,1 %	6,8 %	5,4 %	7,8 %	3,3 %
2011	52,1 %	9,0 %	19,6 %	4,7 %	–	9,1 %	5,5 %
2008	35,8 %	7,5 %	43,7 %	5,1 %	–	5,4 %	2,5 %
2004	31,5 %	10,2 %	48,4 %	–	–	3,6 %	6,3 %
2001	39,1 %	6,6 %	27,0 %	0,4 %	–	6,3 %	20,6 %
1997	39,4 %	10,2 %	32,1 %	0,2 %	–	3,6 %	14,5 %
1993	41,9 %	11,1 %	26,3 %	–	–	4,8 %	15,9 %
1991	50,1 %	5,2 %	35,9 %	0,2 %	–	6,0 %	2,6 %
1987	48,3 %	5,0 %	38,8 %	–	–	7,1 %	0,8 %
1986	44,3 %	8,0 %	40,9 %	–	–	5,8 %	1,0 %
Dec. 1982	52,2 %	5,9 %	38,4 %	–	–	3,0 %	0,5 %
June 1982	44,3 %	6,1 %	42,8 %	–	–	5,6 %	1,2 %
1978	51,1 %	3,0 %	37,3 %	–	–	5,8 %	2,8 %
1974	45,5 %	–	39,0 %	–	–	12,2 %	3,3 %
1970	57,4 %	–	30,7 %	–	–	7,3 %	4,6 %
1966	61,7 %	–	27,2 %	–	–	6,3 %	4,8 %

== Culture ==
Iserbrook is home to the Martin-Luther-Kirche, Iserbrook, which is part of the parish of Sülldorf-Iserbrook. The parish Sülldorf-Iserbrook was formed in 2005 due to financial constraints in the parishes.

=== Sports ===
On the southern edge, between Iserbook and Blankenese, there is the indoor pool "Simrockbad". Opposite this, there are some playing fields of the sports club FTSV Komet Blankenese.

== Infrastructure ==
=== Health systems ===
In Iserbrook there are not less than 12 day care centers for children and as well as 15 physicians in private practices and 2 pharmacies.

=== Transportation ===
Iserbrook station is serviced by the rapid transit system (Line S1) of the city train. Public transport is also provided by buses. Both are operated by the HVV.

According to the Department of Motor Vehicles (Kraftfahrt-Bundesamt), there were 4,467 private cars registered (379 cars/1000 people) in Iserbrook. The Bundesstrasse 431 (one of the biggest East-West transits in North Germany) is passing to connect Altona with Meldorf in Schleswig-Holstein.
