= Rissen =

- Quarter of Hamburg
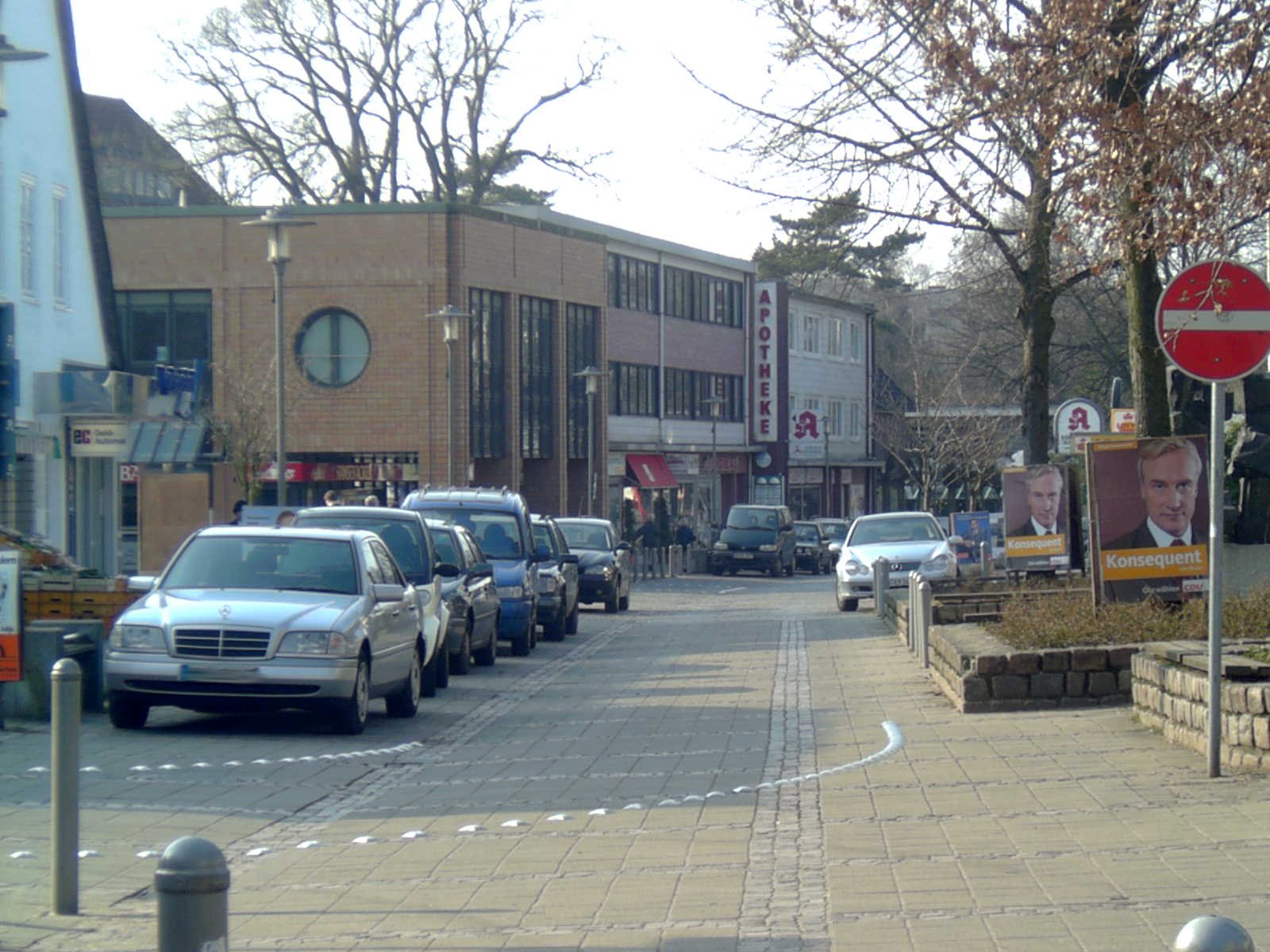
- Shopping street Wedeler Landstraße in Rissen.

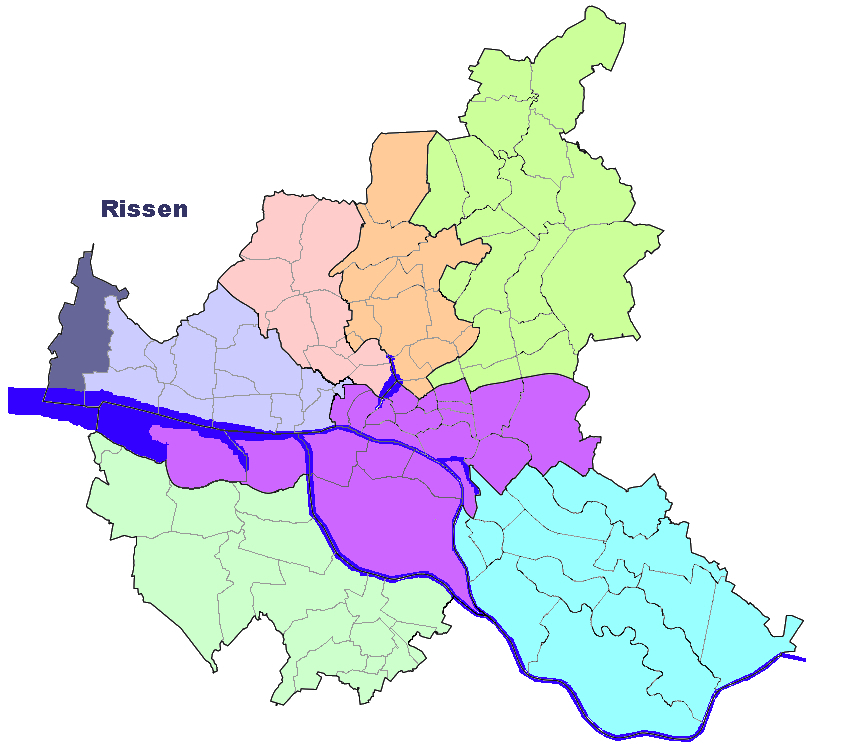
- Quarter Rissen of Hamburg
- Interactive map of Rissen
- Location within Germany Location within Hamburg
- Coordinates: 53°34′45″N 9°45′10″E
- Country: Germany
- State: Hamburg
- City: Hamburg
- Borough: Altona, Hamburg
- Founded: 1255

Area
  - Total: 16.6 km^{2} (6.4 sq mi)

Population (2024-12-31)
  - Total: 16,429
  - Density: 990/km^{2} (2,560/sq mi)
- Time zone: UTC+01:00 (CET)
  - Summer (DST): UTC+02:00 (CEST)
- Dialling codes: 040
- Vehicle registration: HH

Rissen (German pronunciation: [ˈʁɪsn̩]) is a quarter of the city of Hamburg in Germany. It is located in the borough of Altona and is the westernmost quarter of Hamburg, bordering the German federal state of Schleswig-Holstein in the west, north, and northeast and the Elbe river to the south. In 2020, the population was 16,051.

== History ==
Rissen was first officially mentioned in 1255, being named "Risne". For centuries, Rissen was a part of the County of Holstein-Pinneberg, which would have made it a part of the modern German state of Schleswig-Holstein. In 1789, the local government bought a section of Rissen called Klövensteen and let it become a large forest. Until now, this forest is still called Staatsforst Klövensteen ("Klövensteen state forest"). In the 19th century, the locally well-known shipowner Johan Cesar V. Godeffroy purchased a significant portion of the area and dedicated it to become his personal hunting grounds.

In 1927, Rissen became a part of the city of Altona which was then a separate, independent city. In 1938, Altona was incorporated into the city of Hamburg by law through the enactment of the Greater Hamburg Act. As a result, Rissen also became a part of Hamburg.

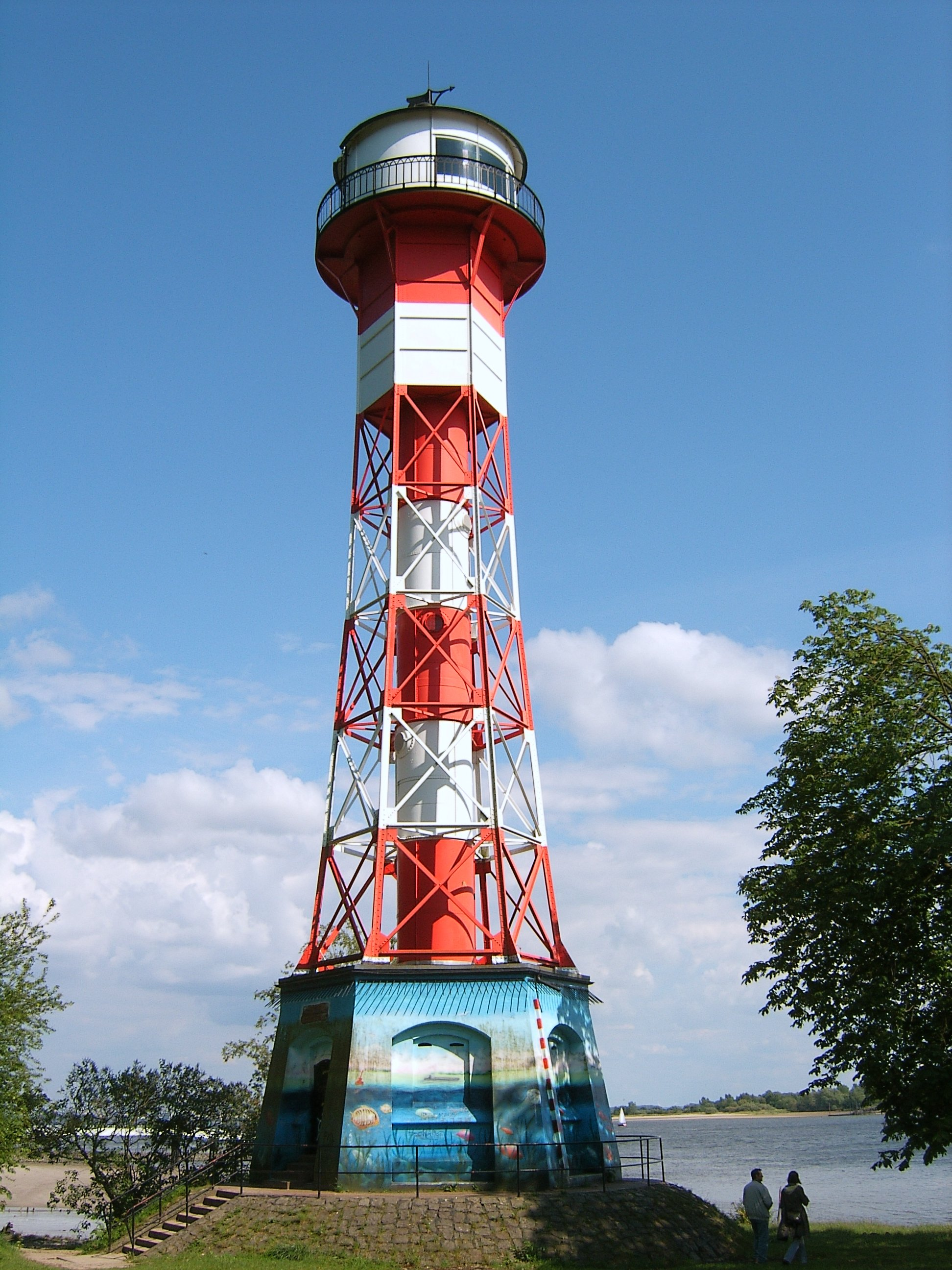
Rissen's lighthouse

== Geography ==
In 2006 according to the statistical office of Hamburg and Schleswig-Holstein, Rissen has a total area of 16.6 km^{2}. It shares borders with the Schleswig-Holstein towns of Wedel, Pinneberg, and Schenefeld in the west, north, and northeast, respectively, and with Hamburg's quarters Sülldorf and Blankenese in the east. To the south, the river Elbe forms a natural border. South of the river lies the German federal state of Lower Saxony. Rissen is situated on the right bank of the river.

From south to the north, Rissen is about three times as long as from the west to the east.

In the north of Rissen lies a large forested area, the so-called Klövensteen which is a popular place for recreational activities like walking, jogging, riding, etc.

== Demographics ==
In 2007, 14,440 people were living in Rissen. The population density was 864 people per km^{2}. 16.6% were children under the age of 18, and 29.2% were 65 years of age or older. 6% were immigrants. 220 people were registered as unemployed. In 1999 there were 7,185 households, out of which 18.8% had children under the age of 18 living with them and 42.1% of all households were made up of individuals. The average household size was 2.05.

Population by year

2006	2007	2011
14,493	14,440	14,599

== Education ==
There were 2 elementary schools and 2 secondary schools in the quarter Rissen.

== Infrastructure ==
The Honorary Consulate of Haiti established in Hamburg 1951 is located at Tinsdaler Kirchenweg 275a.

=== Health Care ===
The Asklepios Westklinikum Hamburg is a general hospital with 452 beds in Rissen. The hospital was former a red cross and freemasonry hospital. The hospital has 9 departments, including among others internal medicine, surgery, urology, anaesthetics and intensive care and ambulant surgery. The hospital has also 78 day care spots for psychiatric patients.

23 physicians in private practice, 5 pharmacies and 8 day care centers for children were registered in 2006.

=== Transportation ===
Rissen station is serviced by the rapid transit system of the S-Bahn (Line S1) between Wedel and Poppenbüttel and since 2008 has also had service to Hamburg Airport. According to the Department of Motor Vehicles (Kraftfahrt-Bundesamt), in Rissen were 6,689 private cars registered (465 cars/1000 people).

=== Recreation ===
Rissen is home to Hamburger Golf-Club (HGC) Falkenstein. HGC is a private club founded in 1906 and located at In de Bargen 59. The current clubhouse was constructed from 1930 to 1931. It is a par 71, championship course at 5,387 meters. In 2006 HGC/Falkenstein made the list of top 100 golf courses in the world.
