= Hamburg Airport S-Bahn line =

Hamburg Airport S-Bahn
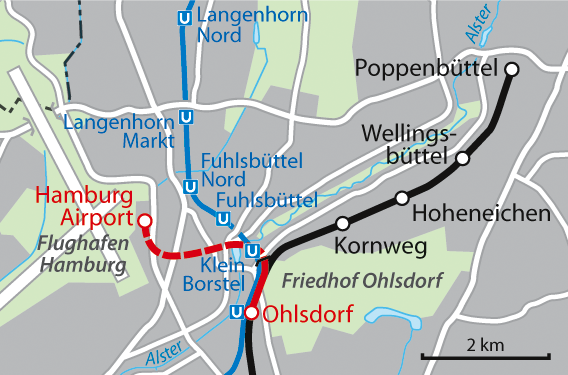

Overview
- Line number: 1239
- Locale: Hamburg, Germany

Service
- Route number: 101.1

Technical
- Line length: 3 km (1.9 mi)
- Track gauge: 1,435 mm (4 ft 8 1/2 in) standard gauge
- Electrification: 1,200 V DC
- Operating speed: 80 km/h (50 mph) (max)

The Hamburg Airport S-Bahn line is a nearly three-kilometre long railway line used by the Hamburg S-Bahn. It was opened on 11 December 2008.

== Route ==
The Airport S-Bahn line connects Hamburg-Fuhlsbüttel Airport via Ohlsdorf station with central Hamburg. The line, with the exception of a short section to the north of Ohlsdorf, is entirely underground. The tunnel ramp is located directly in front of Klein Borstel station on U-Bahn line U1. The tunnel is built at a depth of up to 30 metres below the surface due to geological conditions. It passes under the Alster river and the large residential area of Fuhlsbüttel.

== Operations ==
The route is served by S-Bahn line S1. Trains coming from the city are partitioned at the Ohlsdorf station. The front part of the train runs to the airport and the back of the train continues on the original route of line S1 to Poppenbüttel. Similarly trains running into the city are coupled together at Ohlsdorf. The journey time from Hamburg Hauptbahnhof to the airport is 24 minutes and it is 25 minutes in the opposite direction. Trains between the city and the airport run at ten-minute intervals during the day and at 20-minute intervals in the early morning and the late evening. The track is operated and monitored from an electronic signal box in Ohlsdorf, which was opened in September 2008, just months before the opening of the airport line. The line is equipped with the modern Ks-signal system and GSM-R digital radio.

== History ==
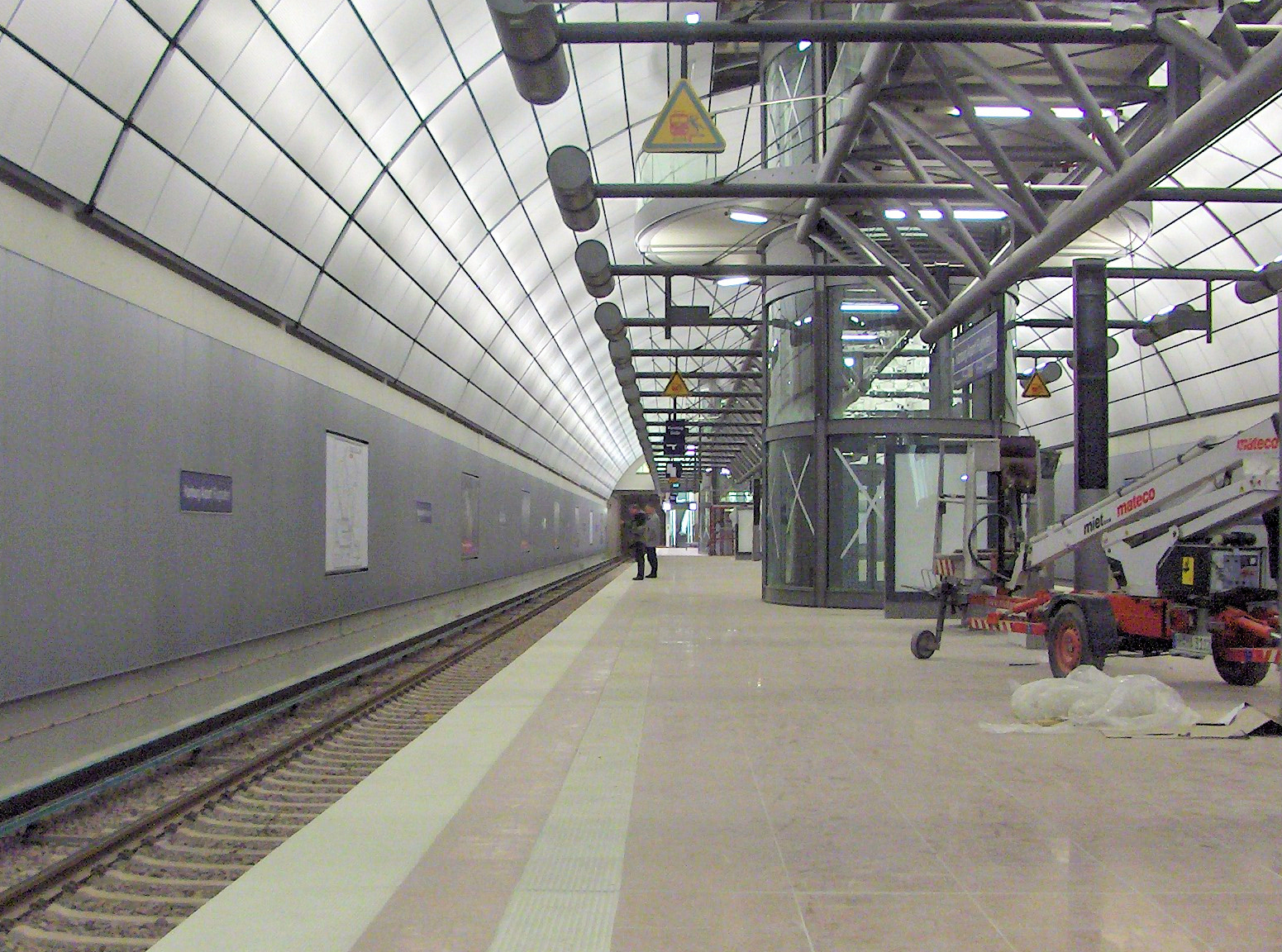
Platforms at the airport station one month before regular operations commenced

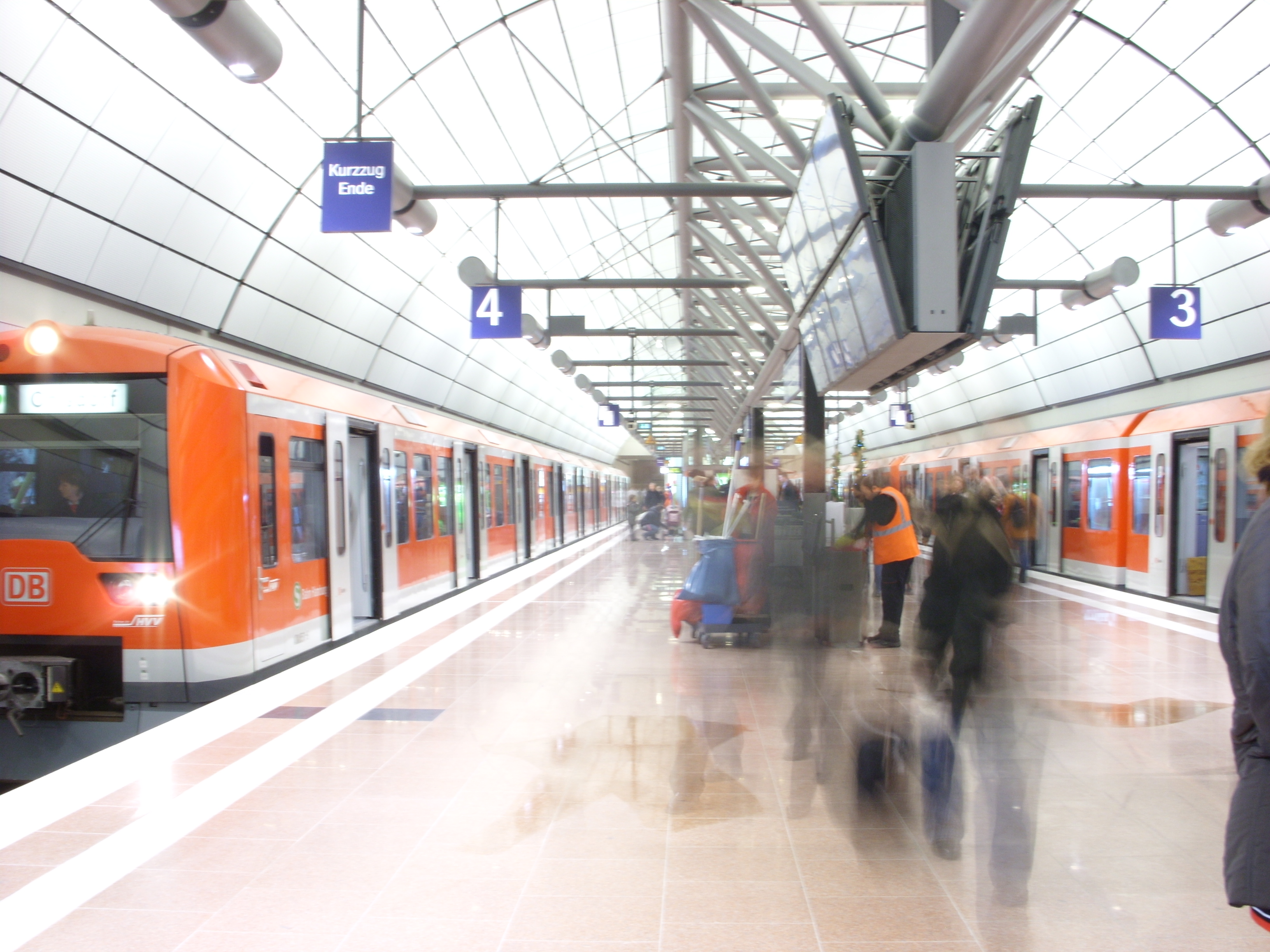
Platforms at the opening on 11 December 2008

A railway to the airport has been discussed since the 1960s, including as a possible extension of the original route of U-Bahn line 4, on which work was abandoned in 1974. Further planning of a rail connection progressed slowly, partly because until the 1980s, there were plans for a new major airport at Kaltenkirchen, replacing the existing Hamburg airport. It was only after the plans for the new airport were dropped that a new rail link to the airport was re-examined, but little progress was made in the late 1980s due to lack of funding. However, in 1991 a shell for part of a station was built at the airport. In 1998 the Senate of Hamburg (government) decided to expand the airport, including a rail link. Progress was delayed by protests by local residents and work finally began on 11 April 2001. However, work was again delayed by water leaks during construction in 2004 and the line was finally opened to regular traffic on 12 December 2008. On the previous day free familiarisation trips operated to the airport station.

== Extensions ==
Under the air train (Flugzug) concept, the S-Bahn line would be extended north of the airport the line to connect with the line of the AKN Railway or the Alster Northern Railway. Connection to an upgraded AKN-trunk line via Henstedt-Ulzburg and Kaltenkirchen would create a Kiel–Hamburg Airport–Hamburg line, allowing connections between many parts of Schleswig-Holstein and the airport.

== Line data ==
The track is designed for a maximum speed of 80 km / h and electrified with the third-rail DC system used by the Hamburg S-Bahn. The tunnel ramp has a slope of 8.0 percent. Hamburg Airport (Flughafen) station has a 140 metre long central platform and is therefore suitable for the assembly of trains. The total cost of the project (as of 2008) was about €280 million, with 60% of funds coming from the city of Hamburg and 40% from the federal government. In the early days about 13,500 passengers a day were expected.

== Discussion on the station name ==
Until September 2008 it was envisaged that the new station would be named Hamburg Airport, that is, using English only. Following the current addition of the German term, Flughafen to the name, the Hamburg government responded to a joint request of its Christian Democratic Union and Green/Alternative List Hamburg members to change the name to Flughafen (Hamburg Airport). The proposal responded to complaints regarding the over-use of Anglicisms. Within days of the application the government distanced itself from the proposal, as modification would have led to significant costs for, for example, the reprinting of timetables and maps. Critics of the proposed change also suggested that an internationally oriented place like the airport station should use an English name. Nevertheless, the main signing of S-Bahn stations at Frankfurt Airport and Munich Airport use German names as well as English.
