= Wedel Power Station =

Coordinates: 53°34′00″N 9°43′31″E

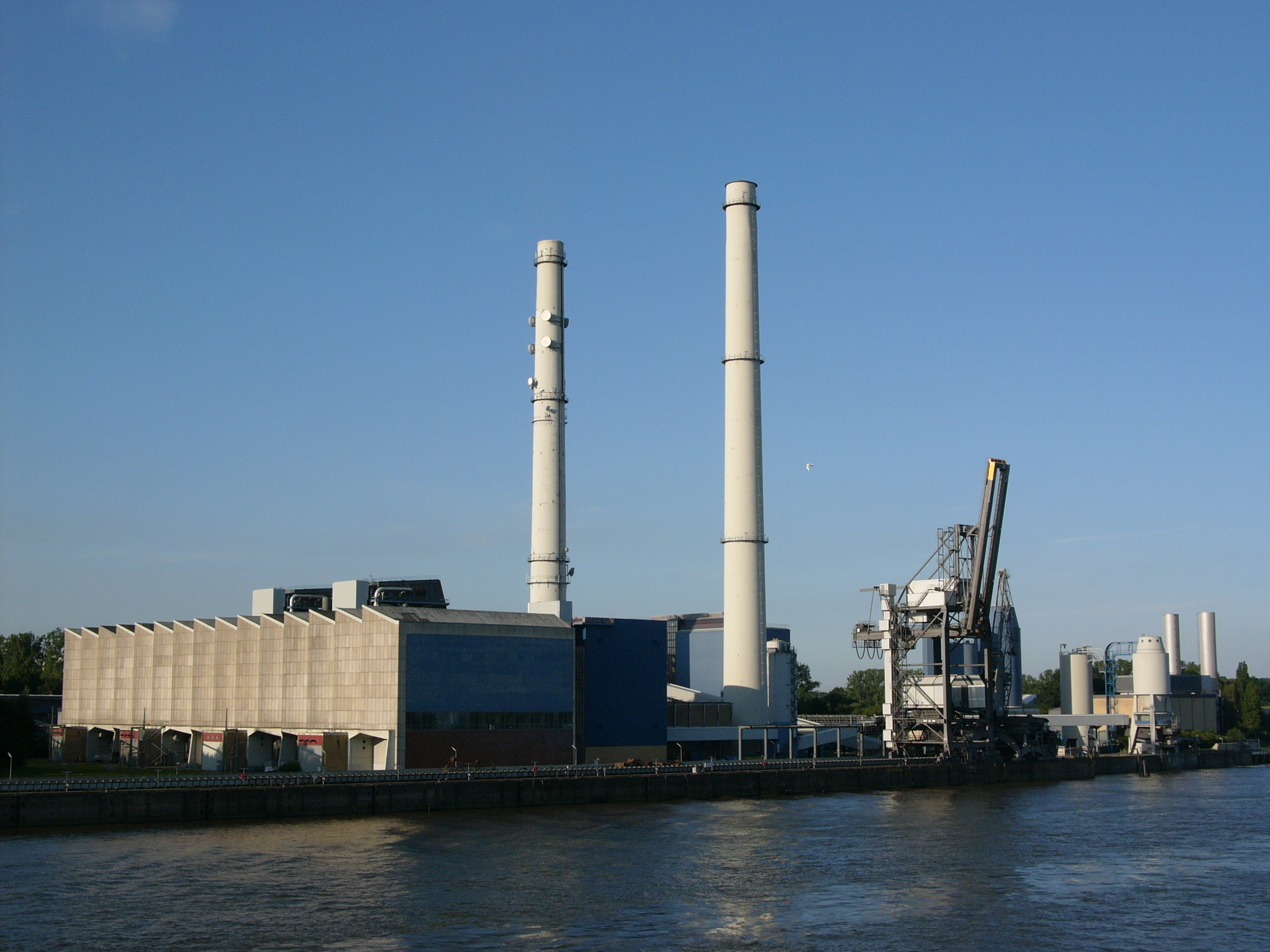

Wedel Power Station is a coal-fired power station in Wedel, Germany. Its two 151 metres tall chimneys were built by HEW between 1961 and 1965. It consists of 2 units with an output power of 200 MW. The station is fronted by a 320-meter quay.

Until 1987, it was used only for the power supply of Hamburg. In 1988/89 the power station was modified in such way, that its excess heat can be used as an extra energy source, and an exhaust cleaning facility was installed. Between 1990 and 1993 the power station was modernized.
