= Sülldorf =

- Quarter of Hamburg
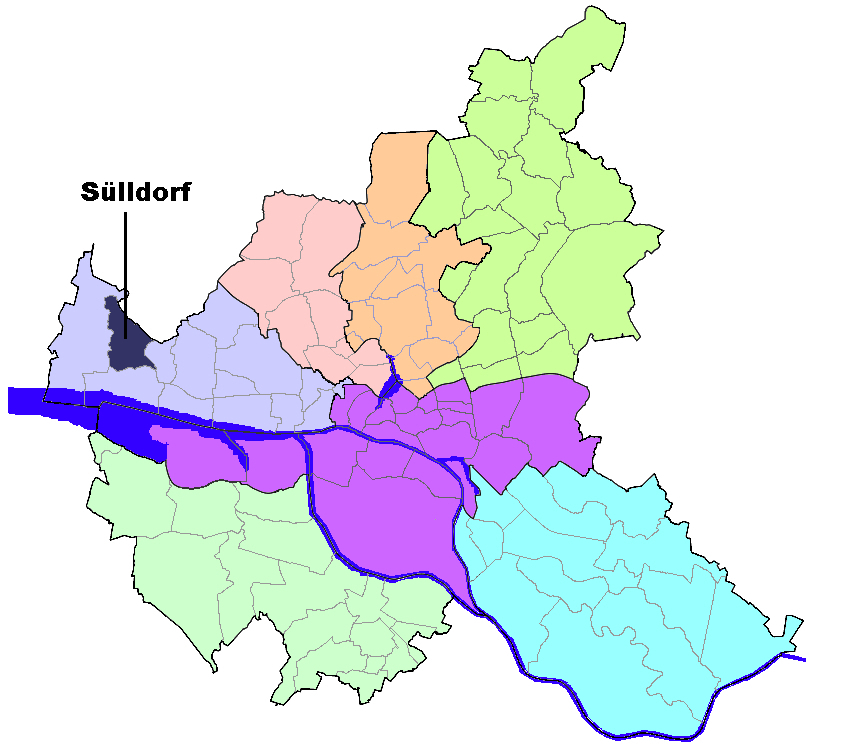
- Location of Sülldorf in the city of Hamburg
- Interactive map of Sülldorf
- Location within Germany Location within Hamburg
- Coordinates: 53°35′6″N 9°47′39″E
- Country: Germany
- State: Hamburg
- City: Hamburg
- Borough: Altona, Hamburg

Area
  - Total: 5.6 km^{2} (2.2 sq mi)

Population (2024-12-31)
  - Total: 9,330
  - Density: 1,700/km^{2} (4,300/sq mi)
- Time zone: UTC+01:00 (CET)
  - Summer (DST): UTC+02:00 (CEST)
- Dialling codes: 040
- Vehicle registration: HH

Sülldorf (German pronunciation: [ˈzʏldɔʁf]) is a quarter in the Altona borough of the Free and Hanseatic city of Hamburg in northern Germany. In 2020 the population was 9,474.

== Geography ==
In 2006, according to the statistical office of Hamburg and Schleswig-Holstein, the quarter Sülldorf had a total area of 5.6 km^{2}.

The western border is to the quarter Rissen. In the East is the quarter Iserbrook, and in the North is the state Schleswig-Holstein. The southern borderquarter is Blankenese.

== Demographics ==
In 2006 in the quarter Sülldorf were living 8,980 people. The population density was 1,603 people per km^{2}. 19.6% were children under the age of 18, and 21% were 65 years of age or older. 9.8% were immigrants. 329 people were registered as unemployed, and 2,383 were employees subject to social insurance contributions.

In 1999 there were 3,979 households, out of which 22.6% had children under 18 living with them and 42.3% of all households were made up of individuals. The average household size was 2.03.

In 2006, there were 566 criminal offences (63 crimes per 1000 people).

=== Population by year ===
The population is counted by the residential registration office for 31 December each year.

1987	1988	1989	1990	1991	1992	1993	1994	1995	1996	1997	1998	1999
7,400	7,396	7,448	7,516	7,543	7,467	7,405	7,788	7,703	7,606	7,730	7,886	8,196

2000	2001	2002	2003	2004	2005	2006
8,337	8,373	8,376	8,532	8,598	8,953	8,980

== Education ==
In 2006, there was 1 elementary school and no secondary schools in Sülldorf.

== Infrastructure ==
=== Health systems ===
In Sülldorf were 3 day care centers for children and also 7 physicians in private practice and 2 pharmacies.

=== Transportation ===
Sülldorf station is serviced by the rapid transit system of the city train. Public transport is also provided by buses.

According to the Department of Motor Vehicles (Kraftfahrt-Bundesamt), in the quarter were 3,562 private cars registered (398 cars/1000 people). There were 15 traffic accidents total, including 13 traffic accidents with damage to persons. The Bundesstrasse 431 is passing to connect Altona with Meldorf in Schleswig-Holstein.
