= Wedel station =

Railway station in Wedel, Germany

Coordinates: 53°34′54″N 9°42′18″E

Wedel (Holst)
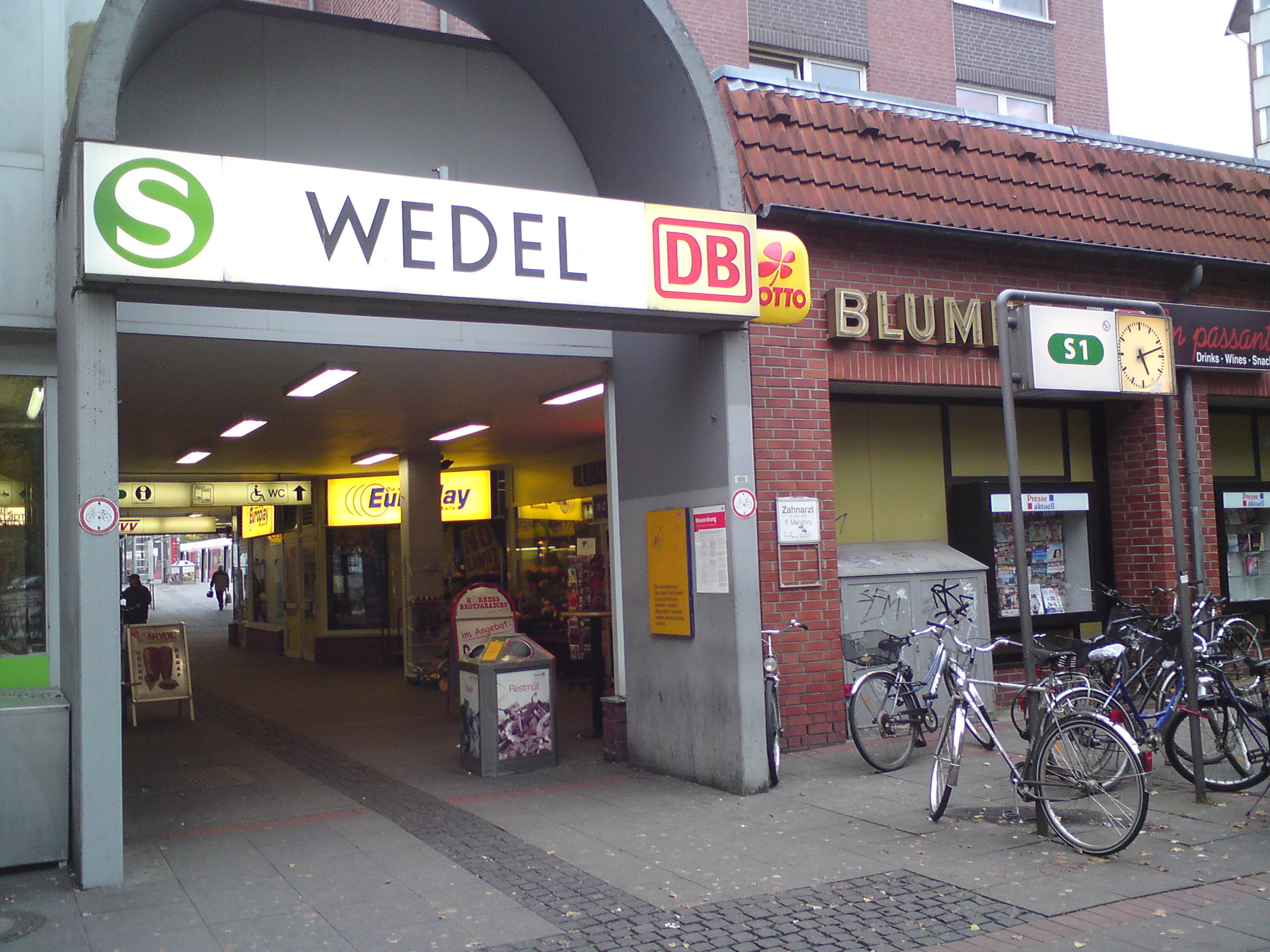

General information
- Other names: Wedel in Holstein
- Location: Rathausplatz 1; 22880 Wedel (Holst); Wedel, Schleswig-Holstein; Germany
- Line: Altona–Blankenese railway
- Platforms: 1 platform, terminus
- Tracks: 2
- Connections: Bus

Construction
- Structure type: At grade

Other information
- Station code: 6575
- DS100 code: AWL
- Category: 5
- Fare zone: HVV: B/501
- Website: www.bahnhof.de

History
- Opened: 1 December 1883; 142 years ago
- Electrified: 20 May 1954; 72 years ago, 1.2 kV DC system (3rd rail)
- Former names: 1883-1934 Wedel

Services
Preceding station	Hamburg S-Bahn	Following station
Terminus	S1	Rissen towards Poppenbüttel or Hamburg Airport
Location

Wedel station (officially Wedel (Holst), meaning Wedel in Holstein) is a railway station on the Altona-Blankenese line, served by the rapid transit trains of the Hamburg S-Bahn, located in Wedel, Germany.

It is a terminus of the line S1.

== History ==
The station was opened on 1 December 1883. The station was then served by four steam trains a day, the number increased to 16 by 1904. During World War II, on 3 March 1943, bombs heavily damaged the station building, which was rebuilt after the war, but demolished in the 1980s for a new car park and bus stop.

Electrification of the railway line was planned since 1948. It was completed in May 1950 to Sülldorf. On 20 May 1954 the electrified track to Wedel was opened.

== Station layout ==
The station is an at-grade terminus with one platform and two tracks. The station is unstaffed but an SOS and information telephone is available. There are several places to lock a bicycle as well as a Park and ride car park. The station is fully accessible for handicapped persons. Also a public toilet and a taxi stand can be found near the station. A shopping arcade is located in the station entrance. There are no lockerboxes.

== Service ==
Trains of S1 line serve the station. A bus stop is located near the station, which is served by bus lines 189, 289, 395, 489, 589, 594 and night bus lines 601, and 621.

== See also ==
- Hamburger Verkehrsverbund
