= Hamburg Airport station =

Railway station in Hamburg, Germany

Hamburg Airport (Flughafen)
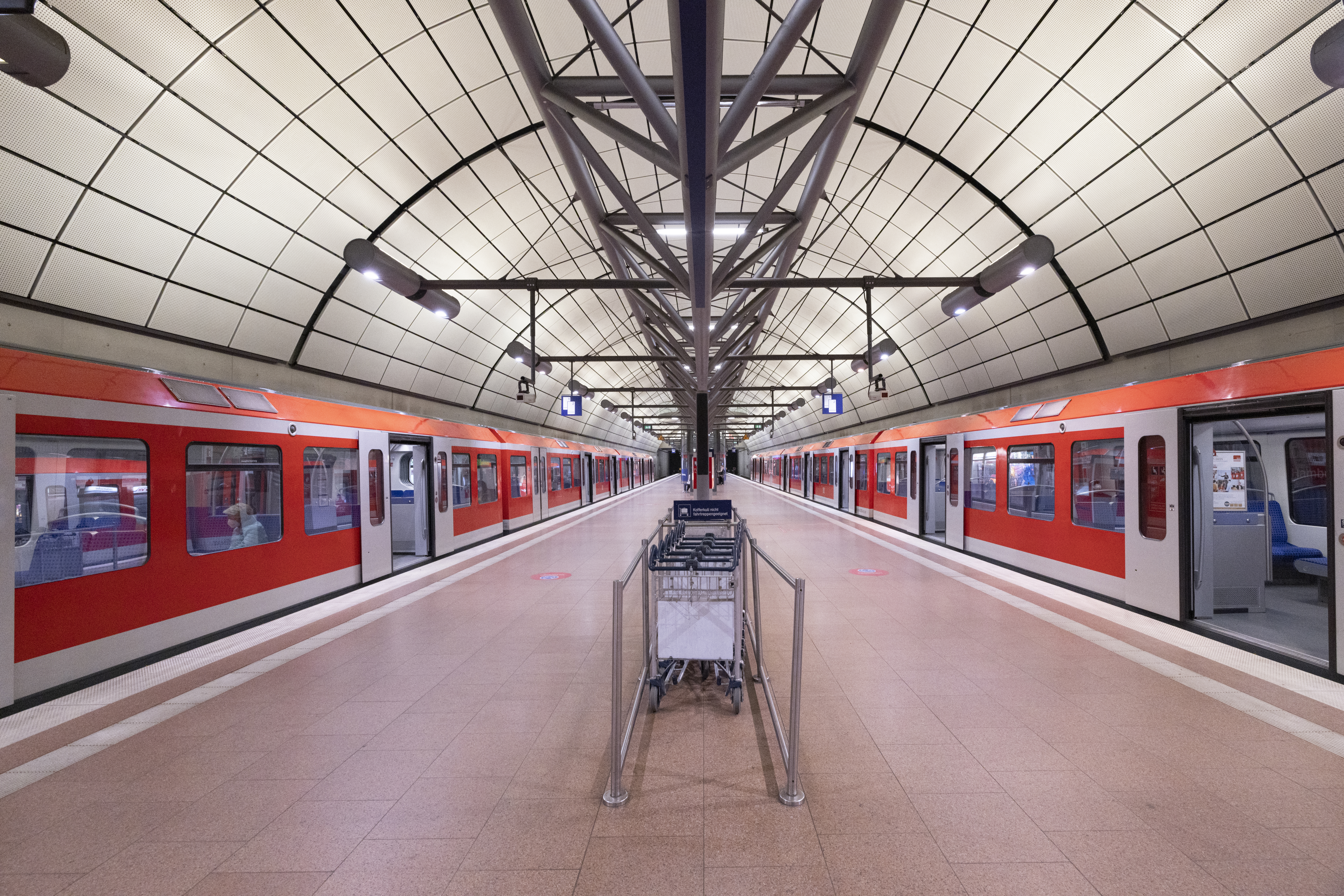

General information
- Location: Flughafenstraße 1; 23335 Hamburg; Germany
- Coordinates: 53°37′55″N 09°59′22″E
- Operator: S-Bahn Hamburg GmbH
- Line: Hamburg S-Bahn S1
- Platforms: 1 island platform
- Tracks: 2
- Connections: Bus, Plane

Construction
- Structure type: Underground

Other information
- Station code: 2458
- DS100 code: AAI
- Category: 4
- Fare zone: HVV: A/203

History
- Opened: 11 December 2008; 17 years ago
- Electrified: at opening

Services
Preceding station	Hamburg S-Bahn	Following station
Ohlsdorf towards Wedel	S1	Terminus
Location

Hamburg Airport (Flughafen) is a station on line S1 of the Hamburg S-Bahn, serving Hamburg's airport in the quarter of Fuhlsbüttel in the northeast of the city. It opened in 2008. According to S-Bahn Hamburg GmbH — owner and operator of the S-Bahn — about 13,500 passengers used the service per day in 2009, with an increase to 20,000 daily passengers by 2013. The station's name is identical in both English and German with the English word "airport" being used primarily in both languages and with the German equivalent "Flughafen" added in brackets.

== Service ==
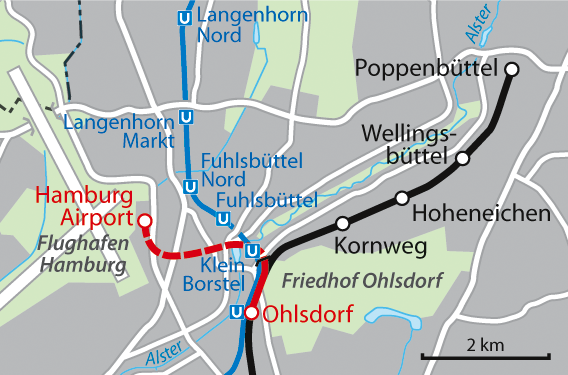
Overview map of the Hamburg Airport rail line (marked in red)

During daytime the station is served with a ten-minute headway, in the early morning and the evening the station is served every twenty minutes. Travel time between the airport and Hamburg main station is approximately 25 minutes. On weekdays the first train arrives at the airport at about 4:30h, while the last train headed for the main station leaves shortly before midnight, covering the complete operation hours of the airport. Since the airport is not operated during night time, there are no night services on the S-Bahn.

Usually the airport is served by three-car trains. The six-car trains composed of two three-car EMUs coming from the main station are split at Ohlsdorf station with the first three cars proceeding to the airport and the last three cars going on to Poppenbüttel.

Before the opening of the station, public transport access to the airport was limited to standard fare bus services and an express bus service between Hamburg main station, Ohlsdorf station and the airport that required an additional fee. A few months after the inauguration of the S-Bahn service, however, the express bus service was discontinued permanently.

== Tariff and fares ==
The airport station lies within the "Hamburg AB" fare area of the HVV (Hamburger Verkehrsverbund - Hamburg Transport Association) and can be reached with a standard ticket, no additional fares apply. In 2023 a single ride from the main station to the airport costs 3,60 EUR for people above the age of 14 and 1,30 EUR for those below that age.

== History ==
For a long time, there has been a desire for a public transport connection to the airport. The buses of the Hamburger Hochbahn were no longer sufficient for the volume of traffic. Due to the plans for an airport in Kaltenkirchen, which had been in progress since the 1960s, the plans for a more efficient public transport connection to Hamburg Airport were initially postponed. After the plans for the Kaltenkirchen airport had been put on hold, the plans for a better connection to the existing airport took shape. The 2.637 km long route and thus also the airport train station were opened on 11 December 2008.

== See also ==
- Hamburger Verkehrsverbund (HVV)
- List of Hamburg S-Bahn stations
- Hamburg Airport
- Hamburg S-Bahn
