= Hamburger Verkehrsverbund =

Transit district in the Hamburg metropolitan area, Germany

- Company type: GmbH
- Founded: 29 November 1965
- Headquarters: Hamburg, Germany
- Area served: Hamburg Metropolitan Region
- Services: Public transport
- Revenue: € 847 million in 2017
- Owner: Free and Hanseatic City of Hamburg (85.5%); State of Schleswig-Holstein (3%); State of Lower Saxony (2%); Districts Herzogtum Lauenburg, Pinneberg, Segeberg, Stormarn, Harburg, Lüneburg and Stade (9.5%)
- Website: www.hvv.com

The Hamburger Verkehrsverbund (HVV) (English: "Hamburg Transport Association") is a transport association coordinating public transport in and around Hamburg, Germany. Its main objectives are to provide a unified fare system, requiring only a single ticket for journeys with transfers between different operating companies, and to facilitate and speed up travel by harmonising the individual companies' schedules. At its inception in 1965, the HVV was the first organisation of its kind worldwide.

As of 2010, the HVV provides rail, bus and ferry transportation for an area of 8,616 square kilometres with approximately 3.6 million inhabitants in the states of Hamburg, Schleswig-Holstein and Lower Saxony. The HVV has approximately 1.95 million customers on an average working day.

The HVV acts as the overall coordinating body for transport in the conurbation, with representation by the Hamburger Hochbahn (Hamburg elevated railway); Deutsche Bahn (DB, German Federal Railways); AKN railway company (Altona-Kaltenkirchen-Neumünster Railway); HADAG Seetouristik und Fährdienst AG (HADAG sea-tourism and ferry service plc); VHH (Verkehrsbetriebe Hamburg-Holstein / Hamburg Holstein Transport Ltd), and KVG Stade (Kraftverkehrgesellschaft Stade, GmbH / Motor Traffic Company, LLC).

With an average of 50,000 commuters per day the Metrobus 5 bus line is the busiest in Europe. In the city centre, stops are served without a specific schedule every two or three minutes and since December 2005, extra long double-articulated buses have been used.

== History ==
The HVV was founded on 29 November 1965, with the four initial partners, Hamburger Hochbahn AG (HHA), Deutsche Bundesbahn (DB), HADAG Seetouristik und Fährdienst AG and Verkehrsbetriebe Hamburg-Holstein (VHH). The first results that the new organisation delivered came on 1 January 1967 with a unified fare structure, pooling of receipts and coordinated systemwide timetables across all modes of transport.

== Organisation ==
The public transport authorities (PTAs) are also the tendering organisations and owners of the limited liability company Hamburger Verkehrsverbund (GmbH). The Free and Hanseatic city of Hamburg (85.5%), the State of Schleswig-Holstein (3%), the State of Lower Saxony (2%) and the Districts Herzogtum Lauenburg, Pinneberg, Segeberg, Stormarn, Harburg, Lüneburg and Stade (9.5%) are these PTAs.

=== Services ===
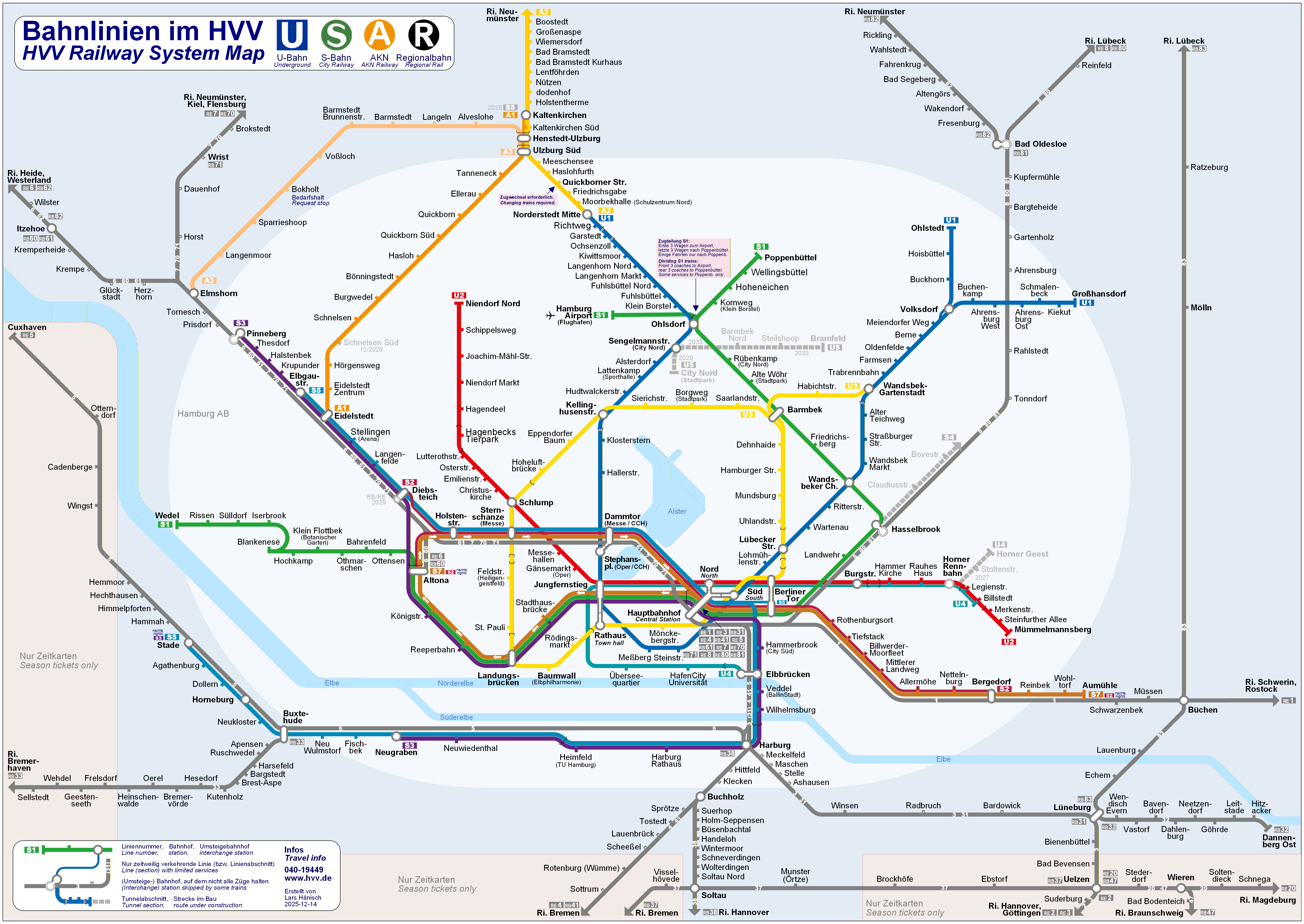
Railway lines in the HVV network

==== Rail transport ====
In 2006, the HVV organised 27 rapid transit rail lines with a length of 881 km (547 mi), with the following operators:

- AKN Eisenbahn (AKN)
- S-Bahn Hamburg GmbH, part of Deutsche Bahn group, operating the Hamburg S-Bahn
- DB Regio AG (Region Niedersachsen/Bremen), part of Deutsche Bahn group
- DB Regionalbahn Schleswig-Holstein GmbH (RBSH)
- Eisenbahnen und Verkehrsbetriebe Elbe-Weser, operating rail and bus services
- Hamburger Hochbahn, operating the U-Bahn and many bus services in Hamburg
- metronom Eisenbahngesellschaft
- NBE nordbahn Eisenbahngesellschaft mbH & Co. KG
- Nord-Ostsee-Bahn GmbH

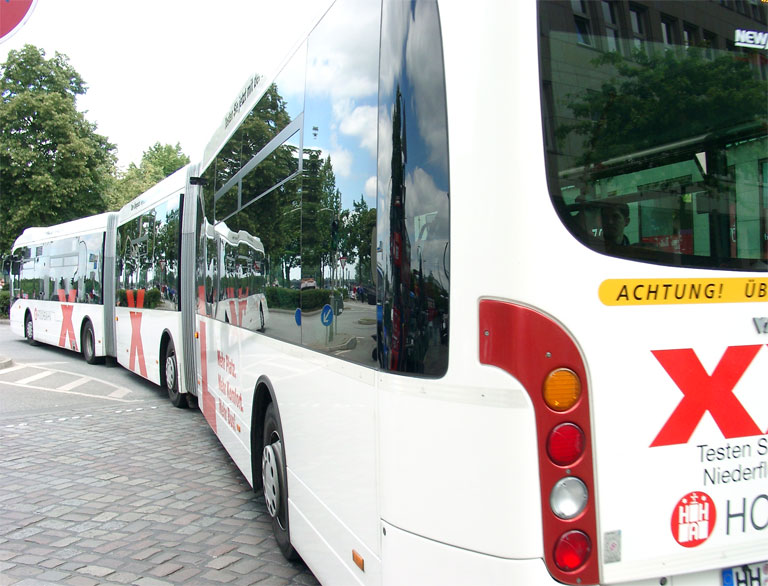
XXL bus on Metrobus 5 line

==== Buses ====
The following companies operate bus services for the HVV:

- Autokraft GmbH
- Becker Reisen GmbH, operating two lines
- Dahmetal KG
- Globetrotter Reisen GmbH, operating two lines
- KVG Stade GmbH & Co. KG
- KViP Kreisverkehrsgesellschaft in Pinneberg mbH, operating in the district Pinneberg
- LBB Linienbus Berkenthin GmbH, operating two lines
- Ludwigsluster Verkehrsgesellschaft mbH
- Mittelzentrumsholding Bad Segeberg-Wahlstedt GmbH & CO. KG, concessionaire for some lines operated by Autokraft
- Omnibusbetrieb Storjohann GmbH & Co. KG]
- Otto Strunk Omnibusbetrieb GmbH
- RMVB Ratzeburg-Möllner Verkehrsbetriebe mbH
- Reese Reisen GmbH
- Stadtverkehr Lübeck GmbH (SL)
- Stadtwerke Bad Oldesloe, Ratzeburg und Mölln
- Süderelbe-Bus GmbH (SBG)
- Verkehrsbetriebe Osthannover GmbH
- Verkehrsbetriebe Buchholz i.d.N. GmbH
- Verkehrsbetriebe Hamburg-Holstein (VHH)
- VKP Verkehrsbetriebe Kreis Plön GmbH
- VGS Verkehrsgesellschaft Südholstein mbH, operating one line
- Zerbin Busreisen GmbH, operating one line

==== Ferries ====
HADAG Seetouristik und Fährdienst operates ferries on the Elbe river.

==== Other organisations ====
- Stadtwerke Norderstedt, operating one night bus line and coordinating public transport in Norderstedt
- Verkehrsgesellschaft Norderstedt mbH (VGN), owing the Norderstedt part of the underground line U1 and a railway line operated by Hamburger Hochbahn AG respective AKN

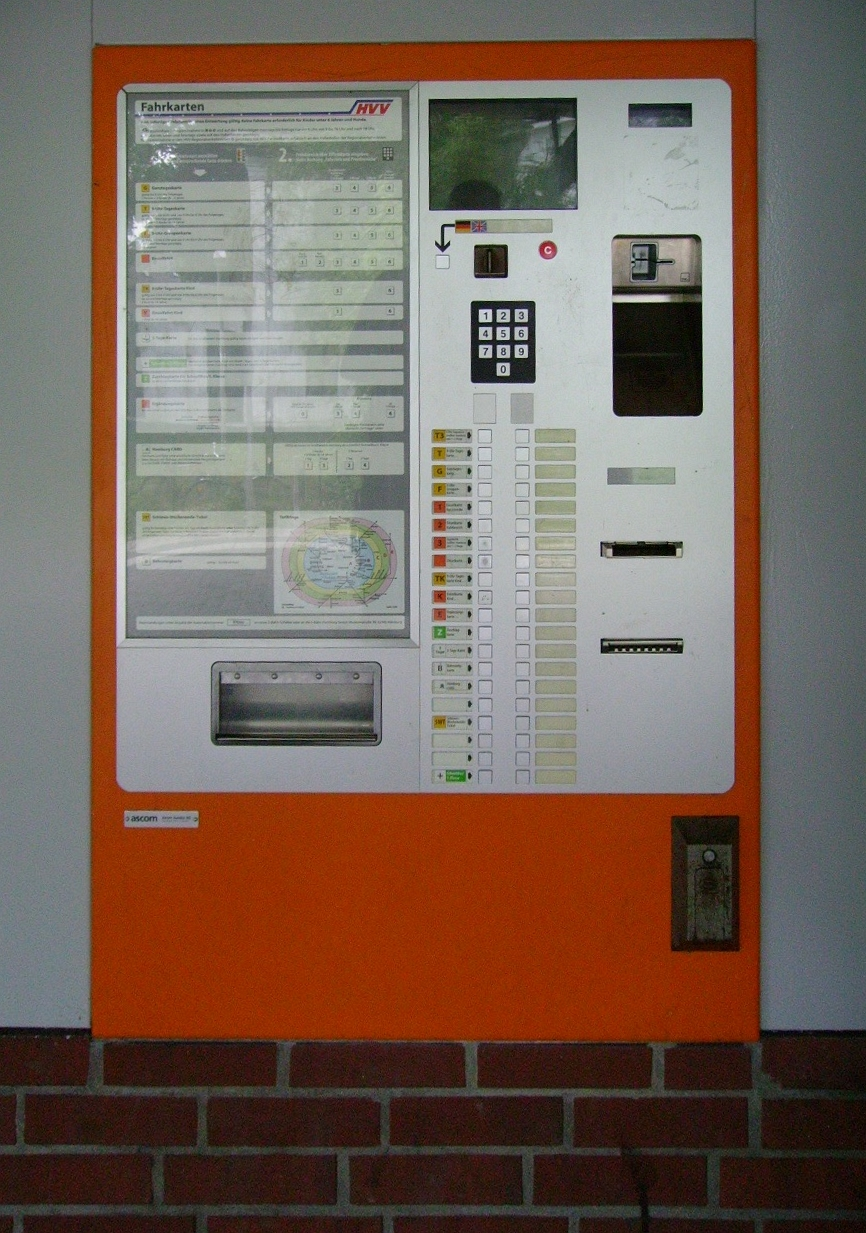
Old ticket machine in Hamburg

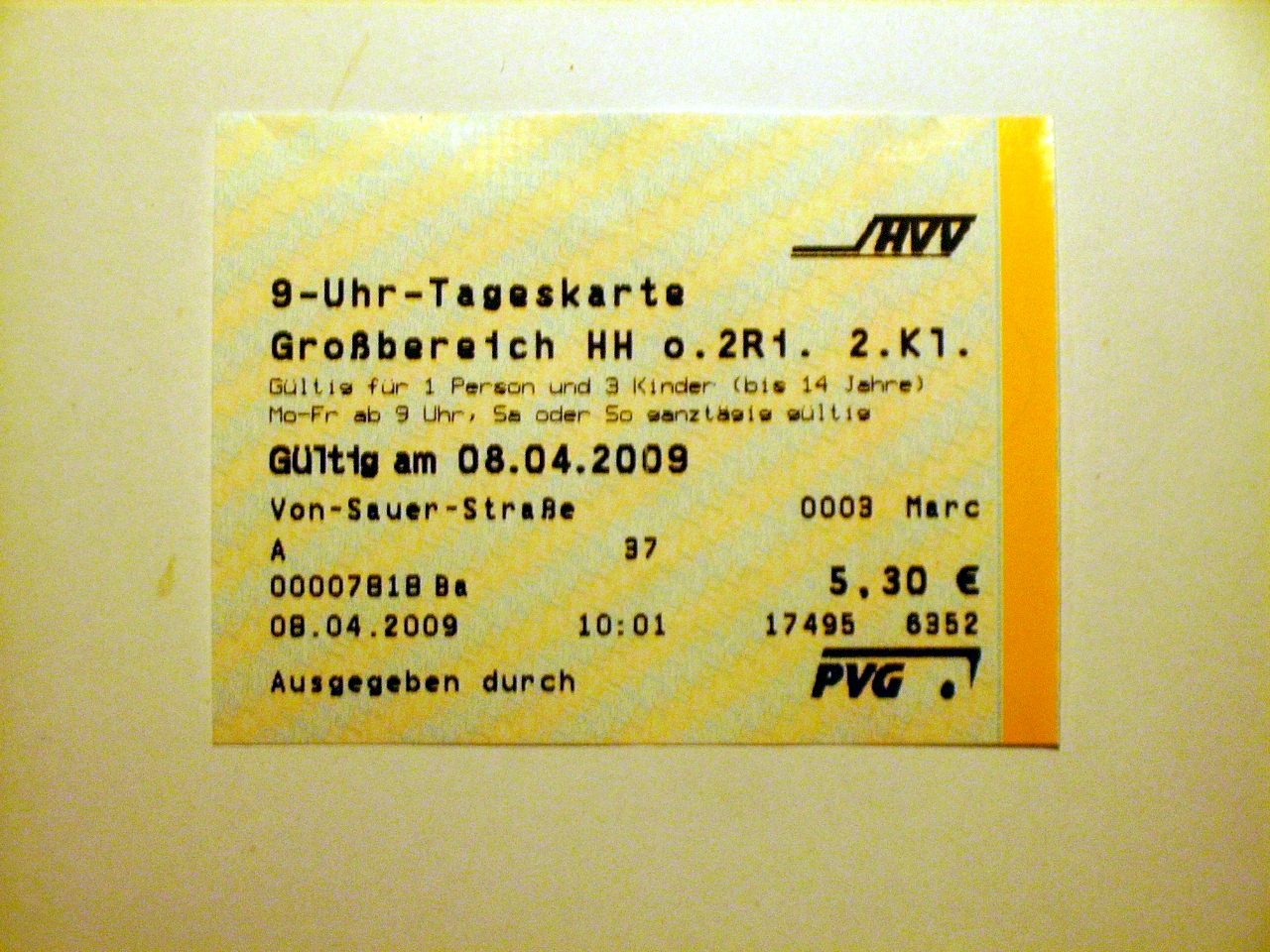
9 a.m. day ticket valid for one person in the Greater Hamburg Area fare zone after 09:00

== Fares ==
The unified fare system includes cash ticket sales (16%), season tickets (for week, month, or year) (72%) and disabled passengers, combined tickets, fare evaders, etc. (12%). In 2011, ticket revenue was €652.2 million. Cash tickets for one ride or the day can be bought at all railway stations, ferry slots or in all buses. There are also "family tickets" (for 2 adults and 3 children) or group tickets for up to 5 adults. The HVV offers travel passes ('ProfiCard'), and semester tickets for the students of all major universities, both heavily discounted. The HVV also offers tickets over mobile phones.

Most tickets are not transferable to other persons.

=== Special programs ===
The HVV offers a variety of types of weekly or monthly special fares.

==== School pupils, students, trainees and apprentices ====
For all public school pupils, tickets can be bought at the company service centers. Other schools need to be registered by the HVV. The semester tuition for most universities include the ticket pass. Trainees and apprentices need be registered by the chamber of commerce to get a season ticket.

==== Children ====
All children to the age of six are free of charge. For older children, seasonal tickets can be chosen.

==== Senior citizens ====
Weekly or monthly tickets for anybody 63 or older are sold at service centers.

== See also ==
- List of German transport associations
