= Hamburg-Wandsbek station =

Former railway station in Hamburg, Germany

Hamburg-Wandsbek
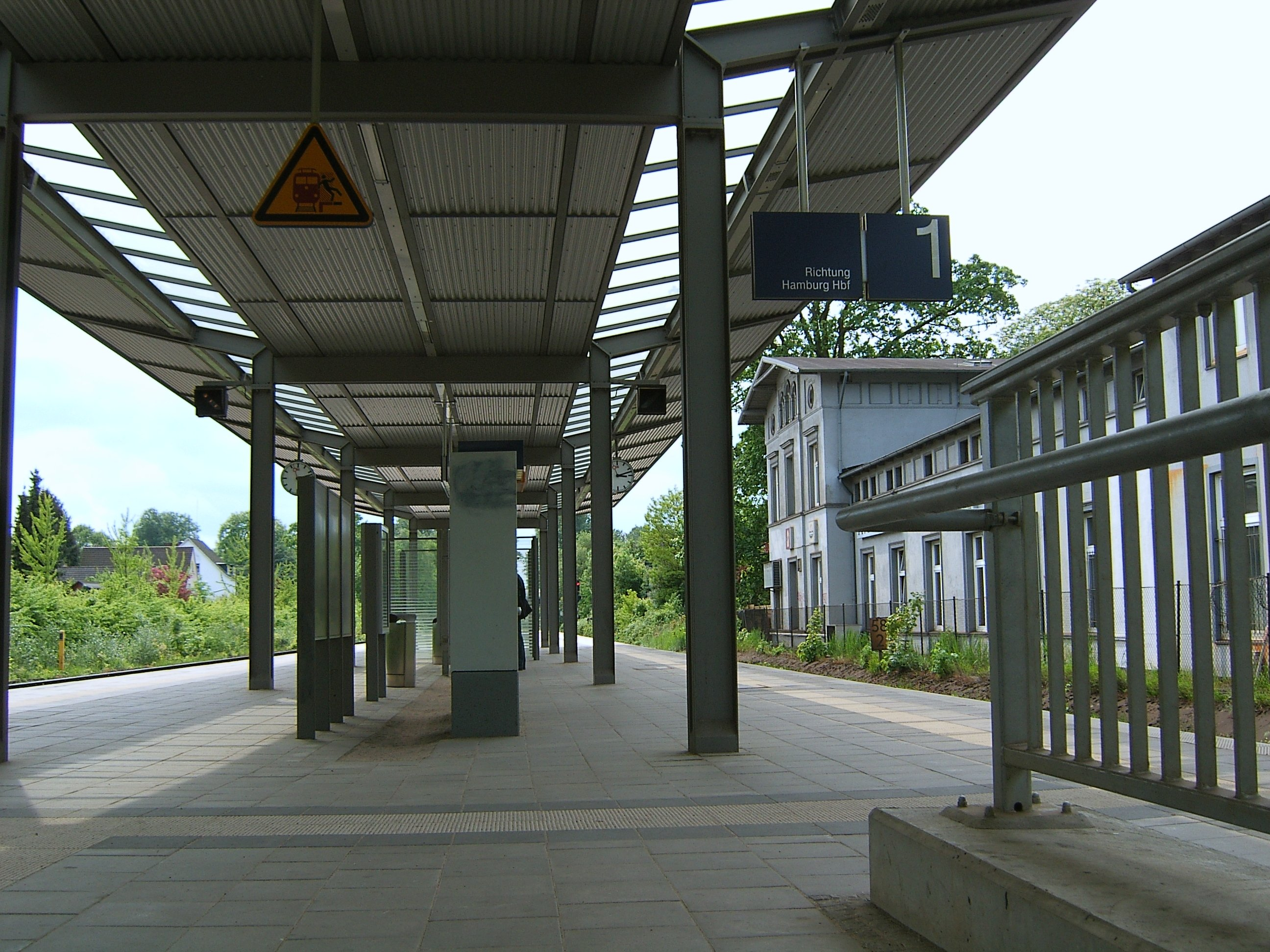

General information
- Location: Bahngärten 34, Hamburg-Wandsbek, Hamburg; Germany
- Coordinates: 53°34′12″N 10°04′38″E
- System: Through station

Other information
- Station code: 2522
- DS100 code: AWN
- Category: 4
- Fare zone: HVV: A/105 and 205
- Website: www.bahnhof.de

History
- Opened: 1 August 1865
- Closed: 11 December 2021
- Electrified: 14 December 2008; 17 years ago, 15 kV 16 2/3 Hz AC system (overhead)
- Former names: 1865-1879 Wandsbeck; 1879-1938 Wandsbek
Location
- Location within Hamburg Location within Schleswig-Holstein Location within Germany Location within Europe

Wandsbek station was a station in the German city of Hamburg. It was built during the construction of the Lübeck–Hamburg railway by the Lübeck-Büchen Railway Company (Lübeck-Büchener Eisenbahn). The railway line cuts through the Wandsbeker Gehölz (Wandsbek wood) here.

== Former station building ==
The three-part building was opened in 1865. The single-storey middle section was originally decorated with gables and a clock. Two-storey wings were added on its sides, which served as entrance and exit halls. The eastern wing was modified after damage during the Second World War.

Despite the changes, the stucco building with its neoclassical forms, which were usual at the time, has heritage protection. The building is now used as a restaurant called the Hofbräu-Wirtshaus Wandsbek. The platform was renewed in 2003 and received a new roof, a lift, new signs and new lighting.

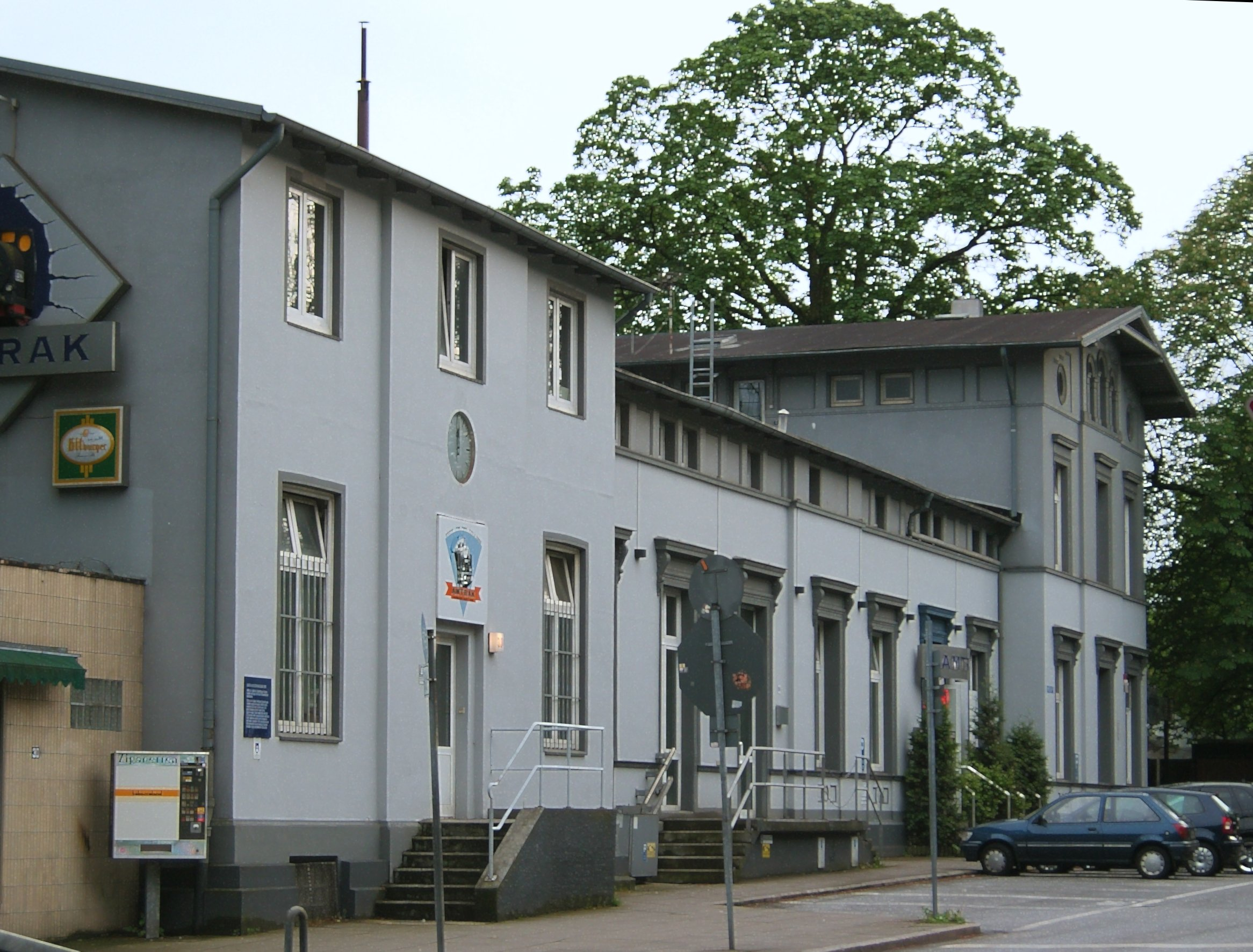
Former station building, street side

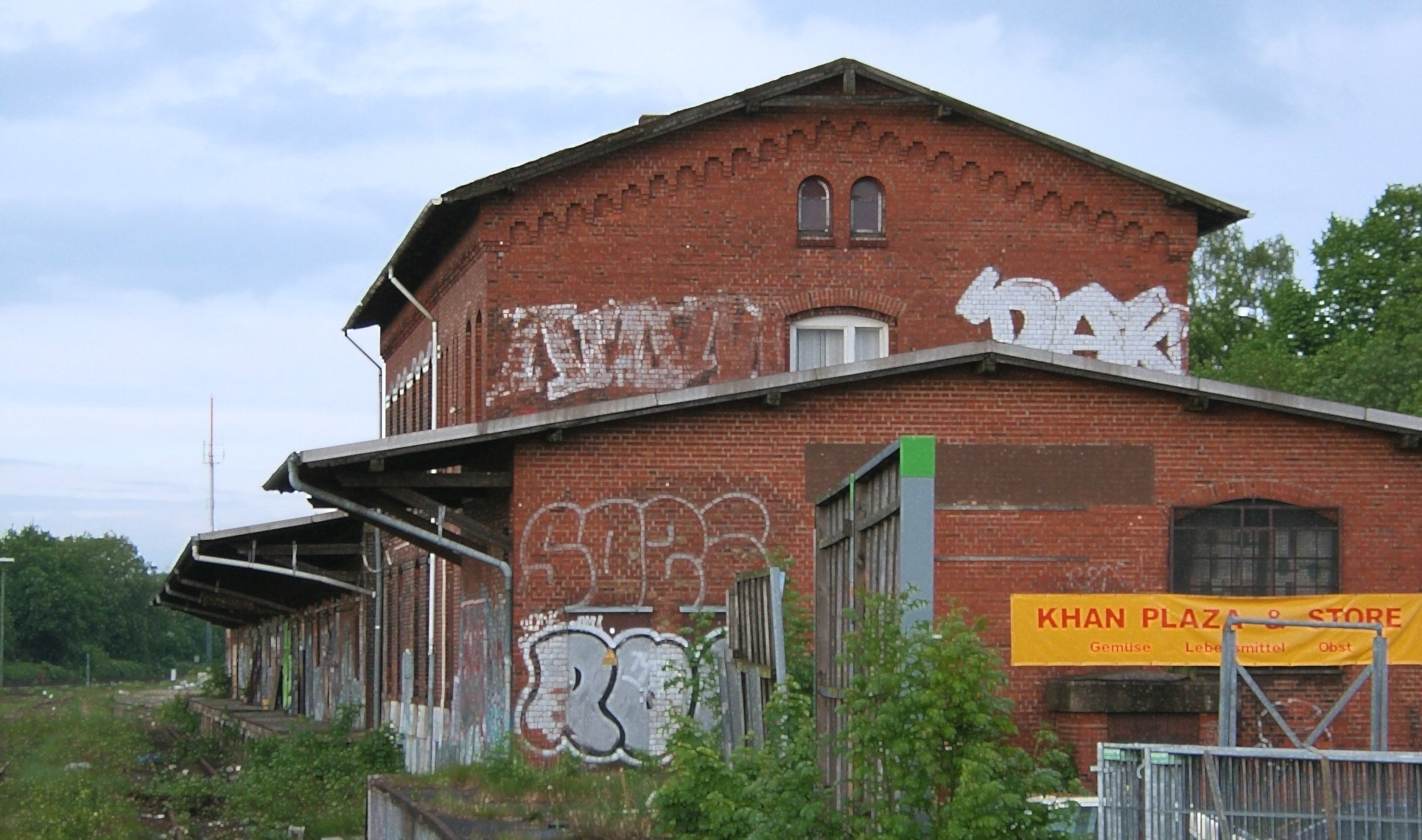
The shed of the former Wandsbek freight yard

== Closure ==
The station closed in December 2021, as part of the construction of Hamburg S-Bahn line S 4. It will be replaced by the new Bovestraße station, which will be built about 300 metres from the present station at the Bovestraße/Bahngärten intersection. The movement of the stop will also simplify several bus routes and shorten the route to the neighbouring Asklepios Klinik Wandsbek hospital.

== Regional services ==
At the time of its closure, the station was served by the following service:

Line	Route
RB 81	Hamburg Hbf – Hasselbrook – Wandsbek – Tonndorf – Rahlstedt – Ahrensburg – Gartenholz – Bargteheide – Kupfermühle – Bad Oldesloe
