= Schillingsbek =

River in Germany

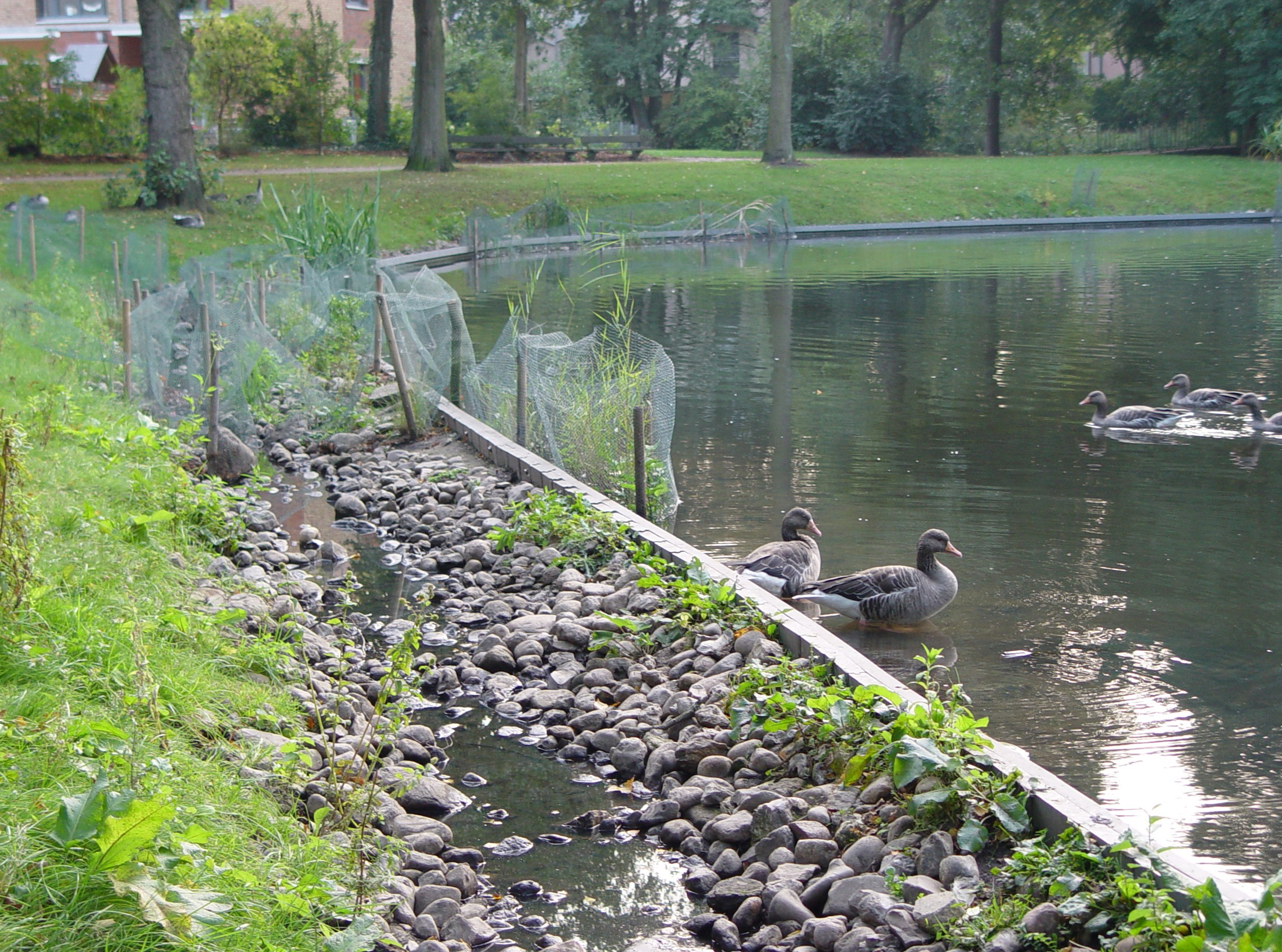
- In Von Eicken Park the Schillingsbek runs past a retention basin.

Location
- Country: Germany
- Location: Hamburg-Lokstedt

Physical characteristics
- Source
  - location: near U-Bahn Hagenbecks Tierpark
  - coordinates: 53°35′37″N 9°56′49″E
  - elevation: 13 m above sea level (NN)
- Mouth
  - location: below the Hamburg Freight Bypass into the Kollau
  - coordinates: 53°36′20″N 9°57′48″E
  - elevation: 7 m above sea level (NN)
- Length: 1.9 km (1.2 mi)

Basin features
- Progression: Kollau→ Tarpenbek→ Alster→ Elbe→ North Sea
- Tributaries
  - right: Lohbek

The Schillingsbek is a stream, about 1.9 kilometres (1.2 mi) long, in Lokstedt district in the German city of Hamburg. Between its source in the vicinity of Julius-Vosseler-Straße to its mouth on the Kollau the Lohbek is its only tributary. A pond in the Von Eicken Park acts as a retention basin and was originally flooded by the Schillingsbek. To improve its water quality the Schillingsbek has been diverted past this pond since 2009 so that only fresh water fills the retention basin when the water levels are medium to high.
