= Hasselbrook station =

Railway station in Hamburg, Germany

Hasselbrook
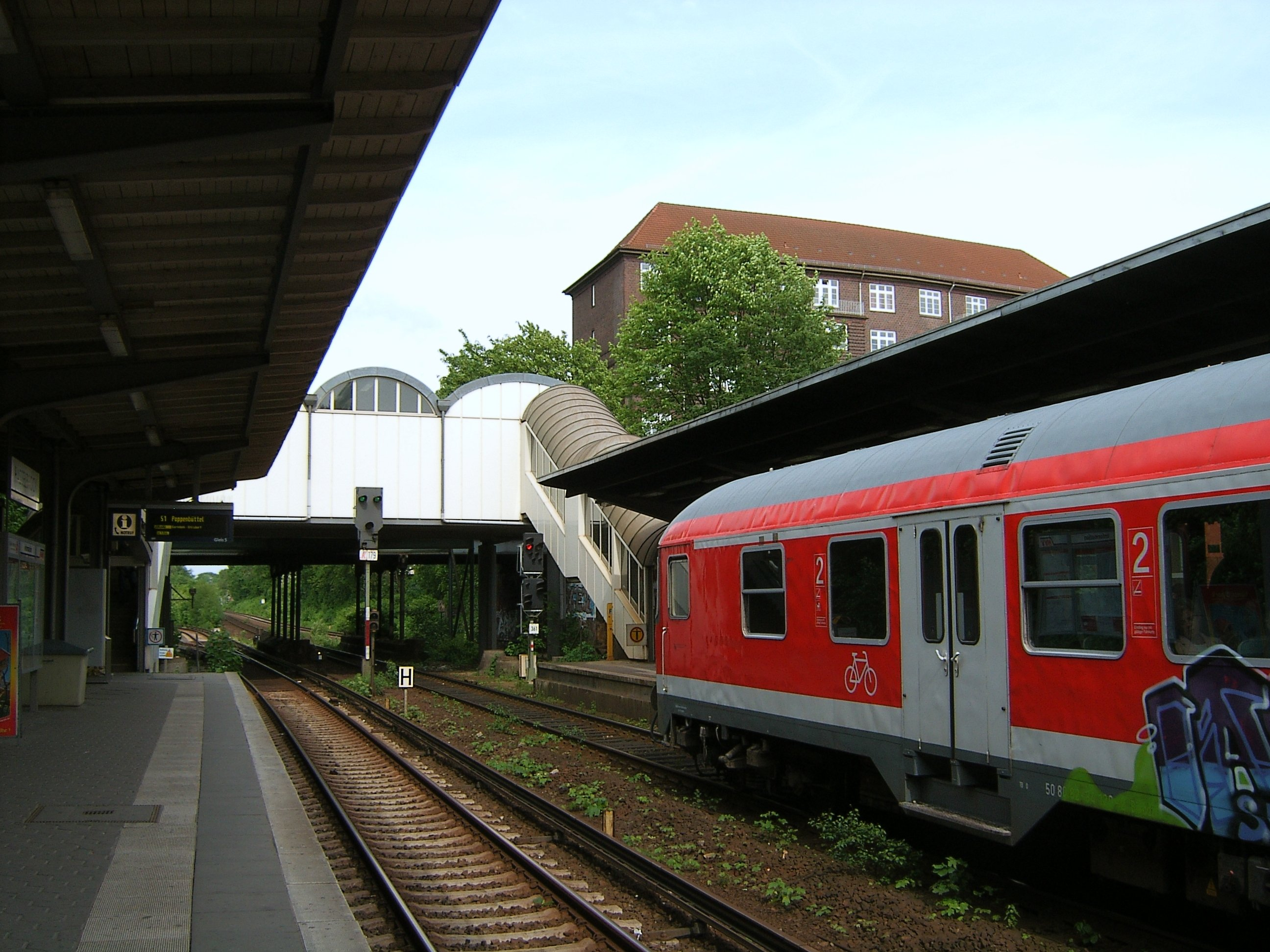
- Platforms at Hasselbrook station

General information
- Location: Hammer-Steindamm 58, Hamburg, Hamburg; Germany
- Coordinates: 53°33′53″N 10°03′21″E
- Lines: Lübeck–Hamburg (KBS 140); link line (KBS 101.1, 101.11)
- Platforms: 2 regional platform tracks; 2 S-Bahn tracks

Construction
- Accessible: Yes (S-Bahn only)
- Architectural style: Revivalism

Other information
- Station code: 2581
- DS100 code: AHSF; AHSB (S-Bahn)
- IBNR: 8002628
- Category: 4
- Fare zone: HVV: A/105
- Website: www.bahnhof.de

History
- Opened: 12 August 1907; 119 years ago
- Electrified: 29 January 1908; 118 years ago, 6.3 kV AC system (overhead; turned off in 1955); 10 April 1941; 85 years ago, 1.2 kV DC system (3rd rail); 14 December 2008; 17 years ago, 15 kV 16 2/3 Hz AC system (overhead)

Services
Preceding station	DB Regio Nord	Following station
Hamburg Hbf Terminus	RB 81	Hamburg-Tonndorf towards Bad Oldesloe
Preceding station	Hamburg S-Bahn	Following station
Landwehr towards Wedel	S1	Wandsbeker Chaussee towards Poppenbüttel or Hamburg Airport
Location

Hasselbrook station is a railway station of the Hamburg S-Bahn and a mainline station on the Lübeck-Hamburg railway in the area of Hasselbrook, Eilbek quarter in the German city of Hamburg.

== History ==
The heritage-listed entrance building was built from 1905 to 1907 as a castle-like brick building of the Gründerzeit-like style of the Hanover school of architecture by its important representative in Hamburg, the civil engineer Franz Andreas Meyer. The station is one of the last stations in Hamburg built in the style and was opened to traffic on 12 August 1907. It served as an interchange point between the Hamburg-Altonaer Stadt- und Vorortbahn (Hamburg-Altona City and Suburban railway, the predecessor of the S-Bahn) and the Lübeck-Hamburg railway. The station building, designed by the architect Eugene Goebel, was restored in the mid-1990s and is now used as a restaurant.

== Layout ==
The bridge next to the station was renovated in 2007 and the side walls of the station had to be cut through to make it accessible for the disabled. The signage was replaced in 2009.

The station has a two sidings, which are used only in exceptional circumstances (track closures, special trains, AKN push–pull trains).

Also located next to the former station building is a preserved bunker of the Zombeck type (a reinforced concrete cylinder with a conical roof and a step-less ramp designed to accommodate 500 people, especially at stations when trains were stopped during air raids) from the Second World War. It was established in 1941 under the then air-raid shelter program to offer passengers and passers-by protection during air raids.

== S-Bahn and regional services ==
The following services stop at the station:

Routes:

Line	Route	Frequency
S1	Wedel – Rissen – Sülldorf – Iserbrook – Blankenese – Hochkamp – Klein Flottbek (Botanischer Garten) – Othmarschen – Bahrenfeld – Altona – Königstraße – Reeperbahn – Landungsbrücken – Stadthausbrücke – Jungfernstieg – Hauptbahnhof – Berliner Tor – Landwehr – Hasselbrook – Wandsbeker Chaussee – Friedrichsberg – Barmbek – Alte Wöhr (Stadtpark) – Rübenkamp (City Nord) – Ohlsdorf | – Hamburg Airport (Flughafen) | – Kornweg (Klein Borstel) – Hoheneichen – Wellingsbüttel – Poppenbüttel	10 min, in peak
RB 81	Hamburg Hbf – Hasselbrook – Tonndorf – Rahlstedt – Ahrensburg – Gartenholz – Bargteheide – Kupfermühle – Bad Oldesloe	

== Gallery ==
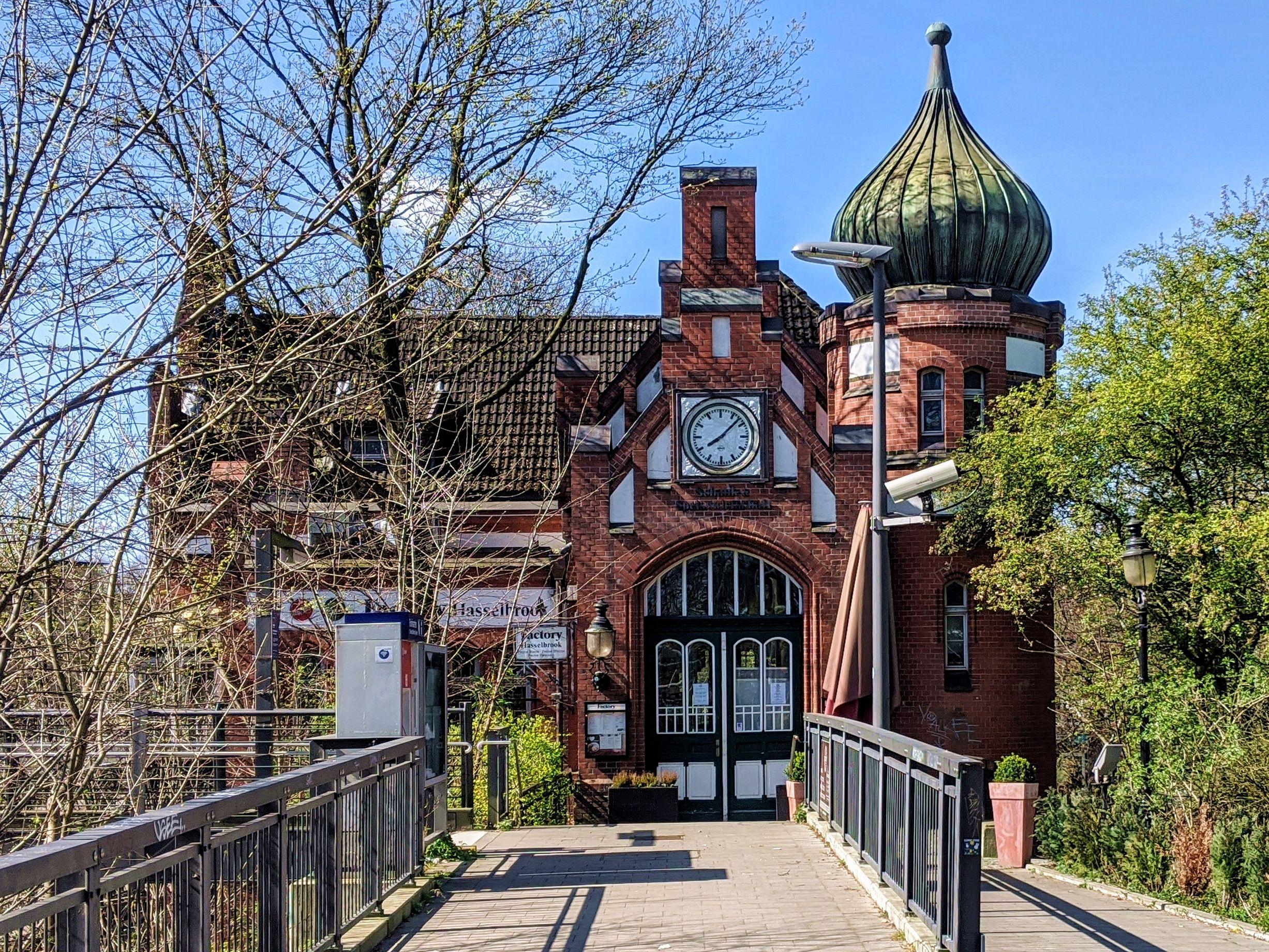
Old entrance

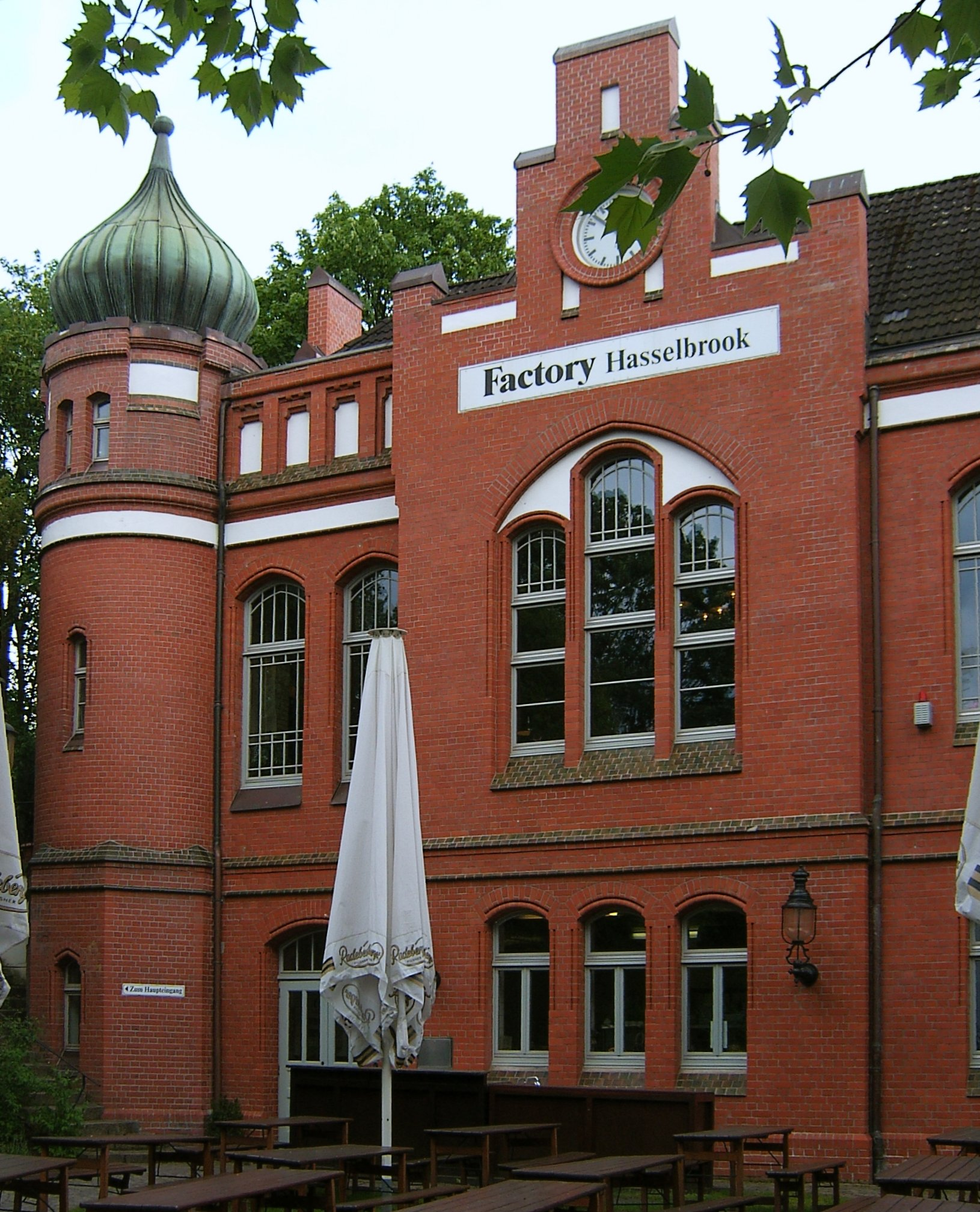
Rear view

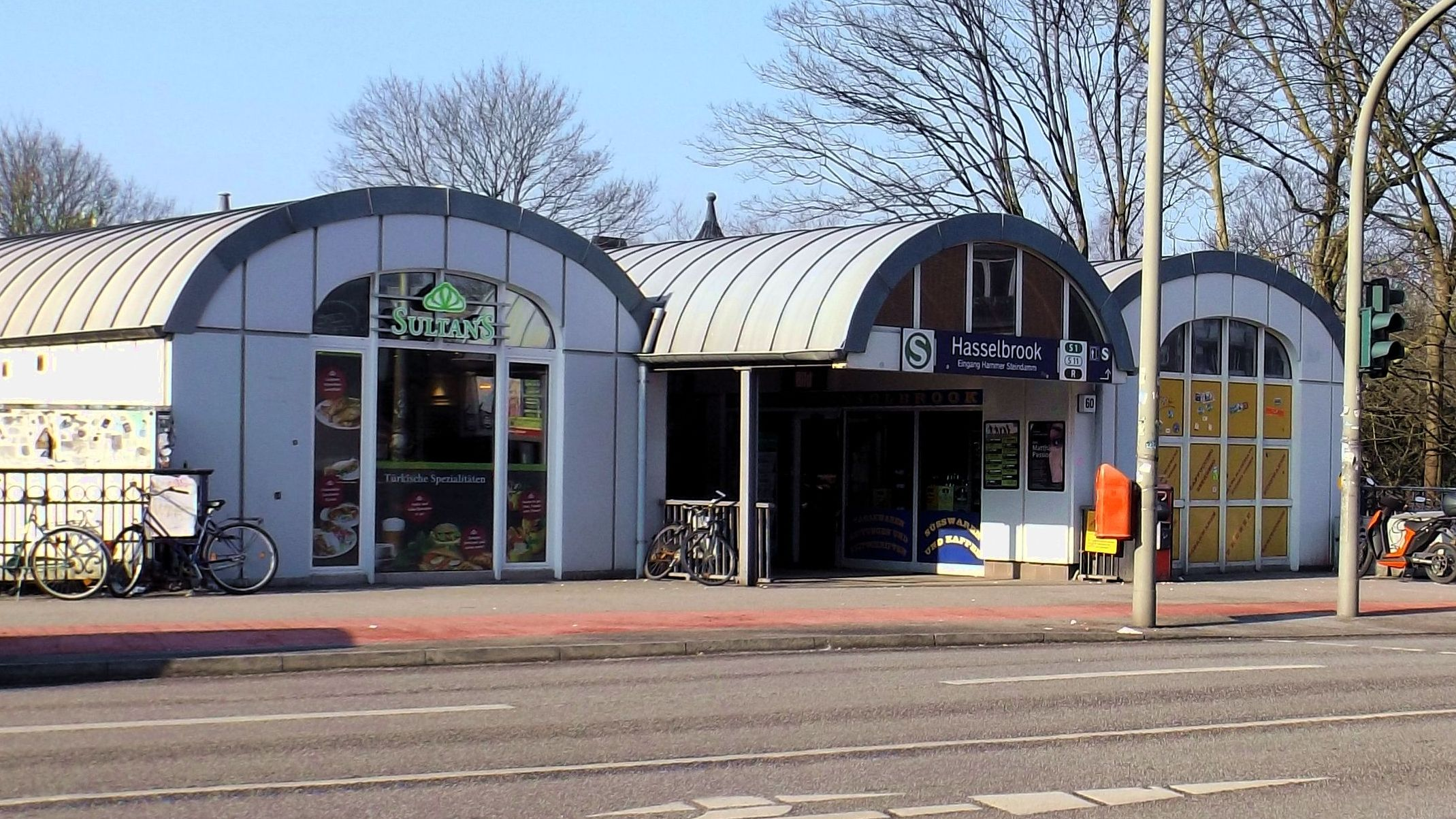
Current entrance from Hammer Steindamm (2018)
