= Lübeck-Büchen Railway Company =

Railway company in Germany (1850–1937)

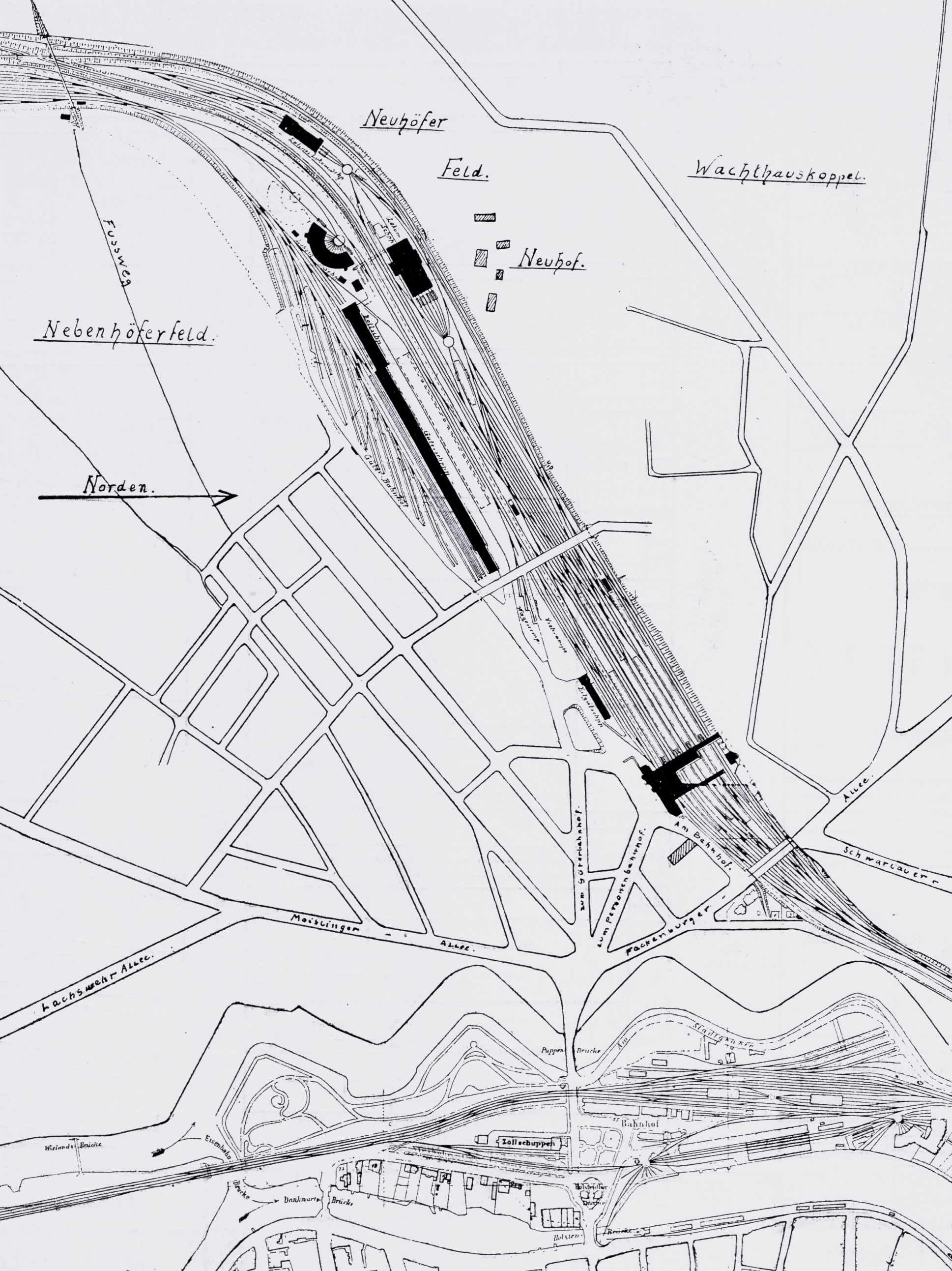
Location of the new LBE facilities in Lübeck in 1908

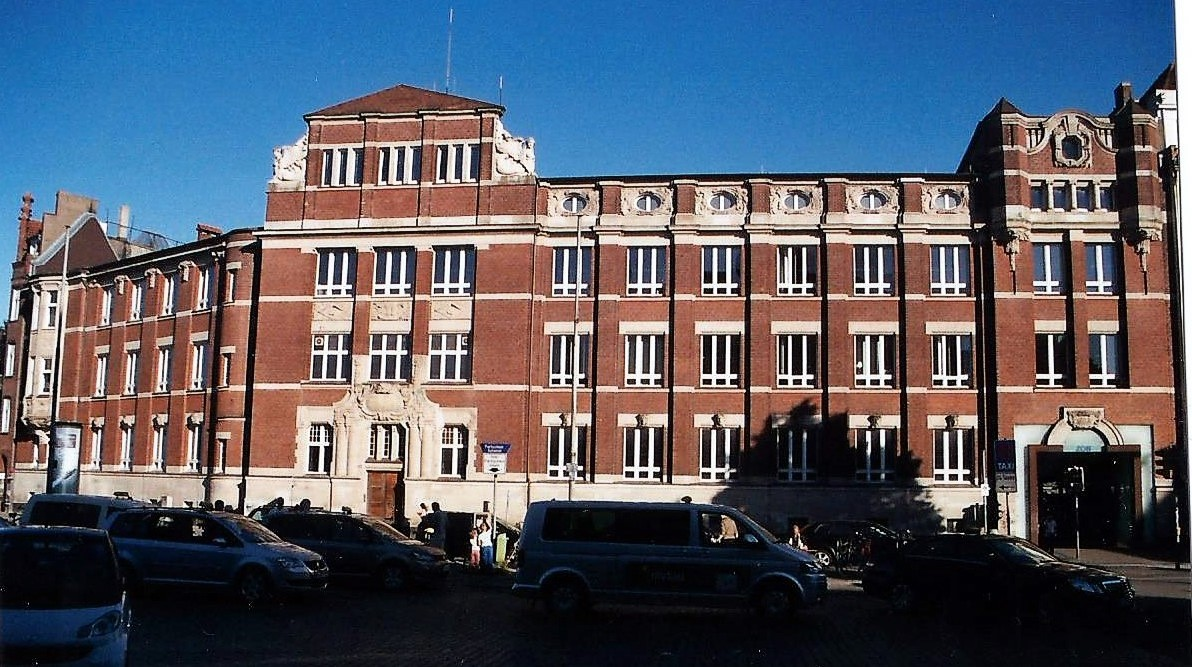
The new building of the LBE

The Lübeck-Büchen Railway (German: Lübeck-Büchener Eisenbahn, LBE) was a German railway company that built railway lines from Lübeck to Büchen and to Hamburg in the 19th century.

== History ==
=== Background ===
The first plans to build a direct rail link between Hamburg and Lübeck were put forward in 1831 by the Lübeck merchant Emil Müller and his father Nicholas Hermann Müller. After the French occupation of Lübeck, Nicholas Hermann Muller had been committed to improving its transport links. He established the first steamship company in Lübeck, operating regular service between Lübeck and Copenhagen.

Emil Müller proposed in 1831 the construction of a railway line between Hamburg and Lübeck, connecting the North and the Baltic Seas, but finding little support in Lübeck, he travelled to London in 1833, where he eventually found investors. Müller recruited as senior engineer Francis Giles, the Chief Engineer of the Newcastle and Carlisle Railway (1829–1836). Marc Isambard Brunel and his son Isambard Kingdom Brunel, the designer of London's Thames Tunnel (1825–1843) also offered their services to Müller. In September 1833, Giles' assistant William Lindley travelled to Hamburg. He would later lead the successful construction of the Berlin-Hamburg Railway and the Hamburg urban drainage scheme. He began surveying the line on 6 November 1833. Although the line would have to run through Holstein-Glückstadt, which was ruled by the King of Denmark, Lindley decided not to submit an application to the Danish authorities for approval for this survey work prior to carrying it out in order to save time.

1834 Giles went to Copenhagen, where on 10 August he submitted the projected railway for approval. Only on this occasion, did he inform the King of Denmark of the survey work that had taken place; this upset the court and affected the simultaneous negotiations on the construction of the Hamburg–Lübeck highway. The railway company was established and investors were sought (with the intention of issuing 15,000 shares at £ 20 sterling each), but share subscription was slow and in 1839 Müller abandoned the project, dissolving the first Lübeck railway company.

A new start was made in 1843, when Lübeck Council decided that it would lead a project to build a railway to Hamburg and took the issue up with the Danish government. The Holstein area lying between Hamburg and Lübeck, however, was under the rule of the Danish king and the Danish court refused to allow the building of a direct connection between the two cities. This was probably at the urging of Holstein and especially of the Kiel district, which considered that the trading activities of Hamburg and Lübeck and their tax and customs laws discriminated against Kiel.

Following pressure from the other states of the German Confederation, as well as Russia and France, the Danish government committed itself on 23 June 1847 to the construction of a railway from Lübeck to Büchen in the Duchy of Lauenburg to connect with the Berlin–Hamburg Railway. Among the supporters for Lübeck's proposal were such renowned figures as Alexander von Humboldt, Klemens von Metternich and the King of Prussia, Frederick William IV.

Consent was given three days before the beginning of the German-nationalist public song festival in Lübeck, and three months before the start of the Germanists’ day (Germanistentag) in Lübeck (27–30 September 1847), chaired by Jacob Grimm, following the first Germanists’ day meeting in the previous year in Frankfurt am Main. The Germanists’ days were part of a political movement in opposition to Denmark's control of Schleswig-Holstein, which gave rise to the Schleswig-Holstein Question. Among other reasons for the selection of the venue for the Germanists’ day had been that the blocking of rail services to Lübeck by Denmark was seen as a "national question", despite the remote location of Lübeck in Germany and the poor accessibility of the missing rail link.

The line was to be an indirect, 35 km-long connection from Lübeck to Hamburg. This compromise meant that the competing Altona-Kiel Railway Company (Altona-Kieler Eisenbahn-Gesellschaft) had an advantage in that the connection from Lübeck to Hamburg via Büchen now had about the same track length as the rail link between Altona and Kiel (both then in Holstein).

=== Construction of the network ===
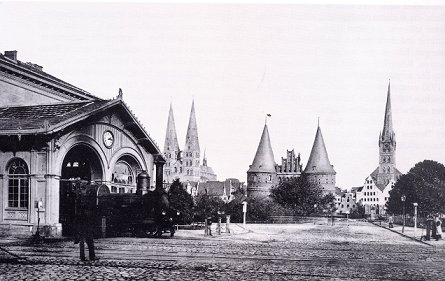
The old Lübeck station, ca. 1865

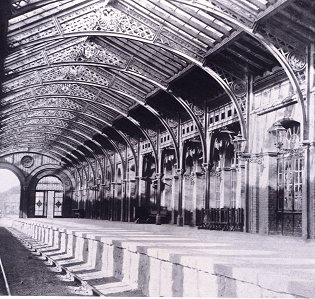
The station interior with only one track and platform.

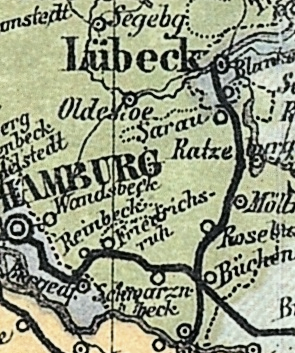
LBE network in 1861

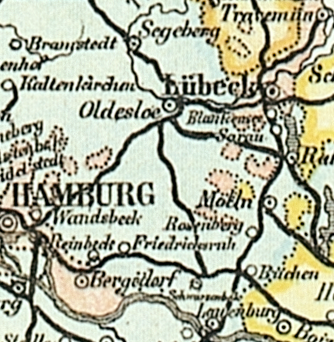
LBE network in 1899

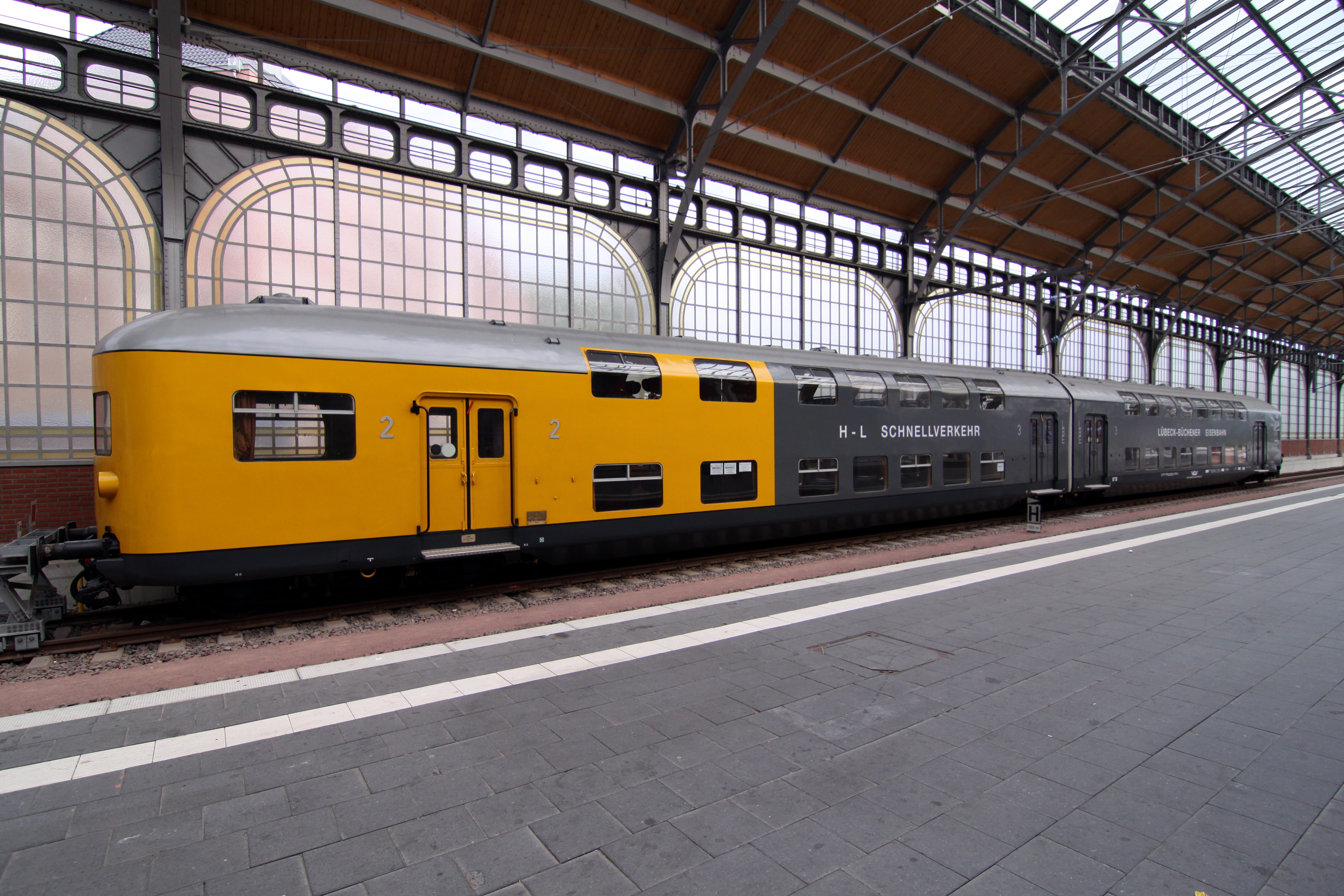
Streamlined bi-level rail car LBE-DW 8

After the Lübeck-Büchen Railway Company was established on 27 February 1850, work began on the construction of the line from Lübeck via Ratzeburg and Mölln to Büchen. A labour force of 2,500 mostly unskilled workers were engaged on the line's earthworks for a total of 400,000 working days up to April 1851.

On 15 October 1851 the line went into operation, although the Danish concession for operations from 1848 to 1857 was granted late because of the revolutions of 1848. The LBE station in Lübeck was close to the Holsten Gate (Holstentor). The line ran by the ramparts of the Lübeck city walls. The felling of numerous street trees and the originally planned demolition of the Rehbock and Scheune bastions met resistance from Lübeck's population. The Council and the Bürgerschaft (Lübeck's parliament) therefore decided that of the felled trees would be sold with their value going to a fund to be used by the Potsdam landscape architect Peter Joseph Lenné to improve the remaining ramparts artistically. The division of the Möllner lake by a railway embankment was met with little enthusiasm by Lübeck's residents.

Economically, the operation of the railway proved to be a success, so that the LBE was able to use its profits to build the Lübeck port railway and a coking plant to supply its locomotives with coke. In 1852 the total route length of the LBE was 47.45 km.

In 1863 the LBE was permitted to build a direct line to Hamburg, which opened on 1 August 1865. The approximately 63 km-long route ran from Lübeck via Reinfeld, Oldesloe, Ahrensburg, Rahlstedt and Wandsbek to Lübecker Bahnhof (Lübeck station) in Hamburg. The LBE's route network in 1870 was 111.27 kilometres long. Heavy traffic on the line to Hamburg meant that a second track was built in 1875–76.

On 1 August 1882 the LBE opened a line from Lübeck to Travemünde. On 1 July 1898 the line opened from Travemünde—now called Lübeck-Travemünde Hafen (port)—to Lübeck-Travemünde Strand (beach). In 1902 took the LBE opened a connection for freight from Wandsbek via Hamburg-Rothenburgsort to the Berlin-Hamburg line, the origin of the modern Hamburg freight bypass. With the opening of the branch line from Travemünde Hafen station to Niendorf (Ostsee) in 1913, the network of the LBE achieved its maximum length of 160.87 kilometres.

=== Connections to other lines ===
Simultaneously with the opening of Lübeck–Büchen line by the LBE in 1851, the Berlin-Hamburg Railway Company opened a line from Büchen to Lauenburg. The LBE had already established a committee in 1850 with funds of 7,000 Prussian thalers to carry out technical tests on the building of a crossing over the Elbe near Lauenburg. After lengthy negotiations between the governments, it was finally decided to build a train ferry.

The operation required a steam ship, commissioned from the engineering office of the Hamburg-Magdeburg Steamship Company (Hamburg-Magdeburger Dampfschiffahrts-Gesellschaft) and put into service in 1864. In February 1869, the high traffic level led to a second ferry being put into service. Numerous breakdowns due to icing in winter and several accidents, however, showed clearly that the ferry would provide no lasting solution. With the annexation of the Kingdom of Hanover by Prussia after the Austro-Prussian War of 1866, the military objections to a fixed Elbe crossing was removed. It was finally decided to build a swing bridge, which was opened in 1878 after two years of construction, allowing through trains from Lübeck to Lüneburg.

On 1 July 1870, the Grand Duchy of Mecklenburg Friedrich-Franz Railway's Lübeck–Bad Kleinen line was opened to the LBE station in Lübeck, and in 1871 the first continuous services operated between Hamburg and Stettin (now Szczecin). The Eutin-Lübeck Railway Company established a line to Eutin in 1873, completing a link between Lübeck and Kiel. In 1916, Lübeck-Segeberg line opened to Bad Segeberg. From the beginning it was operated by the LBE; it only acquired its own rolling stock after the Second World War.

An important railway junction was at Bad Oldesloe, which was connected to Neumünster by the Altona-Kiel Railway Company (Altona-Kieler Eisenbahn-Gesellschaft, AKE) in 1875. In 1884 the AKE was nationalised and became part of the Prussian State Railways (Königlich Preußische Staatseisenbahnen (K.P.St.E)). In 1884, K.P.St.E opened a line to Schwarzenbek and in 1897 a line from Ratzeburg to Hagenow (the Kaiser Railway), creating two additional connections to the Berlin-Hamburg line. The opening of the Elmshorn-Barmstedt-Oldesloe line in 1907 created another connection to Oldesloe.

In 1899, a line to Hollenbek was opened from Mölln by the Prussian State Railways, connecting with the Ratzeburg–Hagenow line. In 1903, the Ratzeburg Light Railway (Ratzeburger Kleinbahn) was opened from Ratzeburg and in 1904 the Alt-Rahlstedt–Volksdorf–Wohldorf Electric Light Railway (Elektrische Kleinbahn Alt-Rahlstedt–Volksdorf–Wohldor) was opened from Rahlstedt, where it connected with the Lübeck–Hamburg line. There were numerous industry sidings, especially in the urban areas of Lübeck, Hamburg and Wandsbek.

In the 1910s the LBE refused to agree to connection at Ahrensburg station with the proposed Hamburg Forest Villages Railway (Walddörferbahn), with the result that this line, which is now part of line U 1 of the Hamburg U-Bahn runs through the southern part of the town, without connecting to the Lübeck–Hamburg line station.

=== New stations ===
In the area of Lübecker Bahnhof in Hamburg, in the early 20th century, there were three stations (Berliner Bahnhof, Hannöverscher Bahnhof and the Bahnhof Klosterthor), none of which had a direct connection to the LBE line. On 6 December 1906, they were replaced by the new Hamburg Hauptbahnhof (central station), when the LBE also extended its line to the station and closed its former station. The LBE also created a new station east of the Hauptbahnhof at Berliner Tor.

In Lübeck, a new station, called Lübeck Hauptbahnhof, was built to the west in the Retteich Meadows. On 1 May 1908, the first train ran to the new station. At the nationalisation of the LBE, the Lübeck Hauptbahnhof was the largest private railway station in Germany.

=== Nationalisation ===
On 1 January 1938, the Lübeck-Büchen Railway Company was acquired by the Deutsche Reichsbahn (German State Railways), which since the beginning of 1930 had held a majority of its shares. The state of Lübeck had held a majority of shares in the company since 1883. During the 1921–1923 hyperinflation, the national Ministry of Transport had acquired shares in the LBE. By 1937 the German government held about 86 percent of its shares. It justified its decision to nationalise the company on the basis of the importance of the lines that were connected by the LBE. The company was dissolved on 1 January 1938.
