= Hamburg-Tonndorf station =

Railway station in Germany

Hamburg-Tonndorf
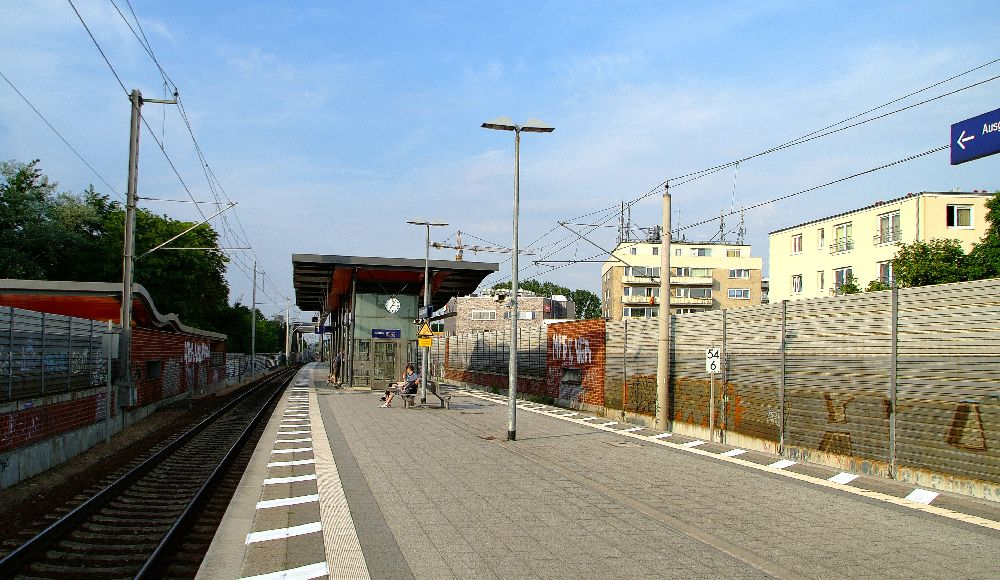
- 2010

General information
- Location: Stein-Hardenberg-Straße 60; 22045 Hamburg-Tonndorf; Hamburg; Germany
- Coordinates: 53.5864°N 10.1230°E
- Owner: Deutsche Bahn
- Operator: DB Station&Service
- Lines: Lübeck–Hamburg railway (KBS 104)
- Platforms: 1 island platform
- Tracks: 2
- Train operators: DB Regio Nord
- Connections: RB 81; 9 27 167 232 567 608

Construction
- Parking: yes
- Cycle facilities: yes
- Accessible: yes

Other information
- Station code: 6529
- DS100 code: AOW
- IBNR: 8006197
- Category: 4
- Fare zone: HVV: A/205
- Website: www.bahnhof.de

Services
Preceding station	DB Regio Nord	Following station
Hasselbrook towards Hamburg Hbf	RB 81	Hamburg-Rahlstedt towards Bad Oldesloe
Location
- Location within Hamburg Location within Schleswig-Holstein Location within Germany Location within Europe

Hamburg-Tonndorf station (German: Haltepunkt Hamburg-Tonndorf) is a railway station in the Tonndorf district in the city of Hamburg, Germany.
