= Landwehr station =

Railway station in Hamburg, Germany

Landwehr
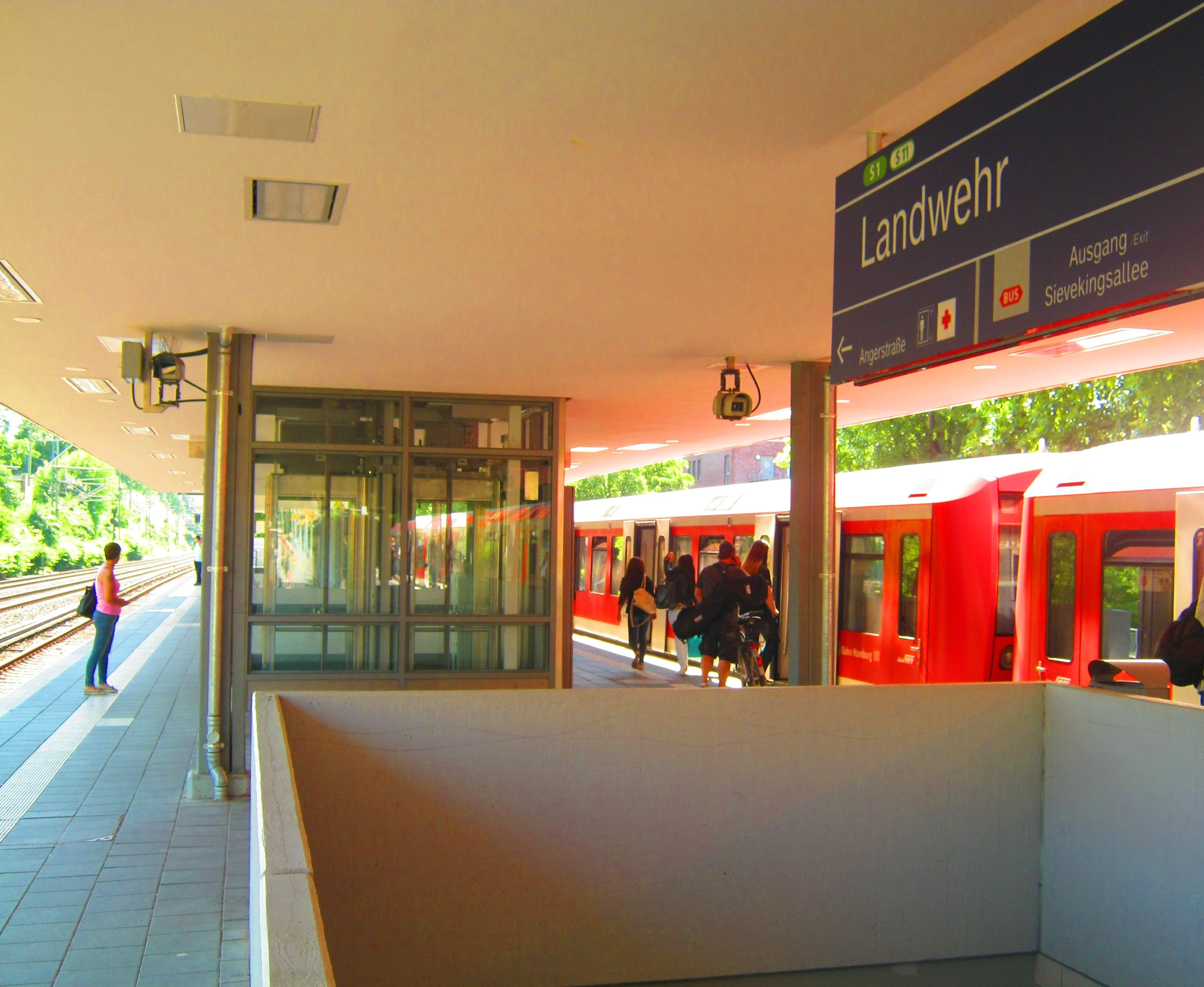

General information
- Location: Hasselbrookstraße 4; 22087 Hamburg, Germany
- Coordinates: 53°33′40″N 10°02′16″E
- Operator: S-Bahn Hamburg GmbH
- Line: S1
- Platforms: 1 island platform
- Tracks: 2
- Connections: Bus

Construction
- Structure type: Elevated

Other information
- Station code: ds100: ALAN; DB: 3518
- Fare zone: HVV: A/105

History
- Opened: 5 December 1906; 119 years ago
- Electrified: 29 January 1908; 118 years ago, 6.3 kV AC system (overhead; turned off in 1955); 10 April 1941; 85 years ago, 1.2 kV DC system (3rd rail)

Services
Preceding station	Hamburg S-Bahn	Following station
Berliner Tor towards Wedel	S1	Hasselbrook towards Poppenbüttel or Hamburg Airport
Location

Landwehr is a station on the Hamburg-Altona link line and is served by line S1 of the Hamburg S-Bahn. Opened in late 1906, the station is situated at the meeting point of the three districts of Borgfelde, Hohenfelde and Eilbek as well as that of the three boroughs of Hamburg-Mitte, Hamburg-Nord and Wandsbek.

== History ==
The station was opened on 5 December 1906 and electrified on 1 October 1907; train service commenced four months later.

== Service ==
Line S1 of the Hamburg S-Bahn stop at Landwehr station.

== See also ==
- Hamburger Verkehrsverbund (HVV)
- List of Hamburg S-Bahn stations
