= Hamburg freight rail bypass =

Railway line in Germany

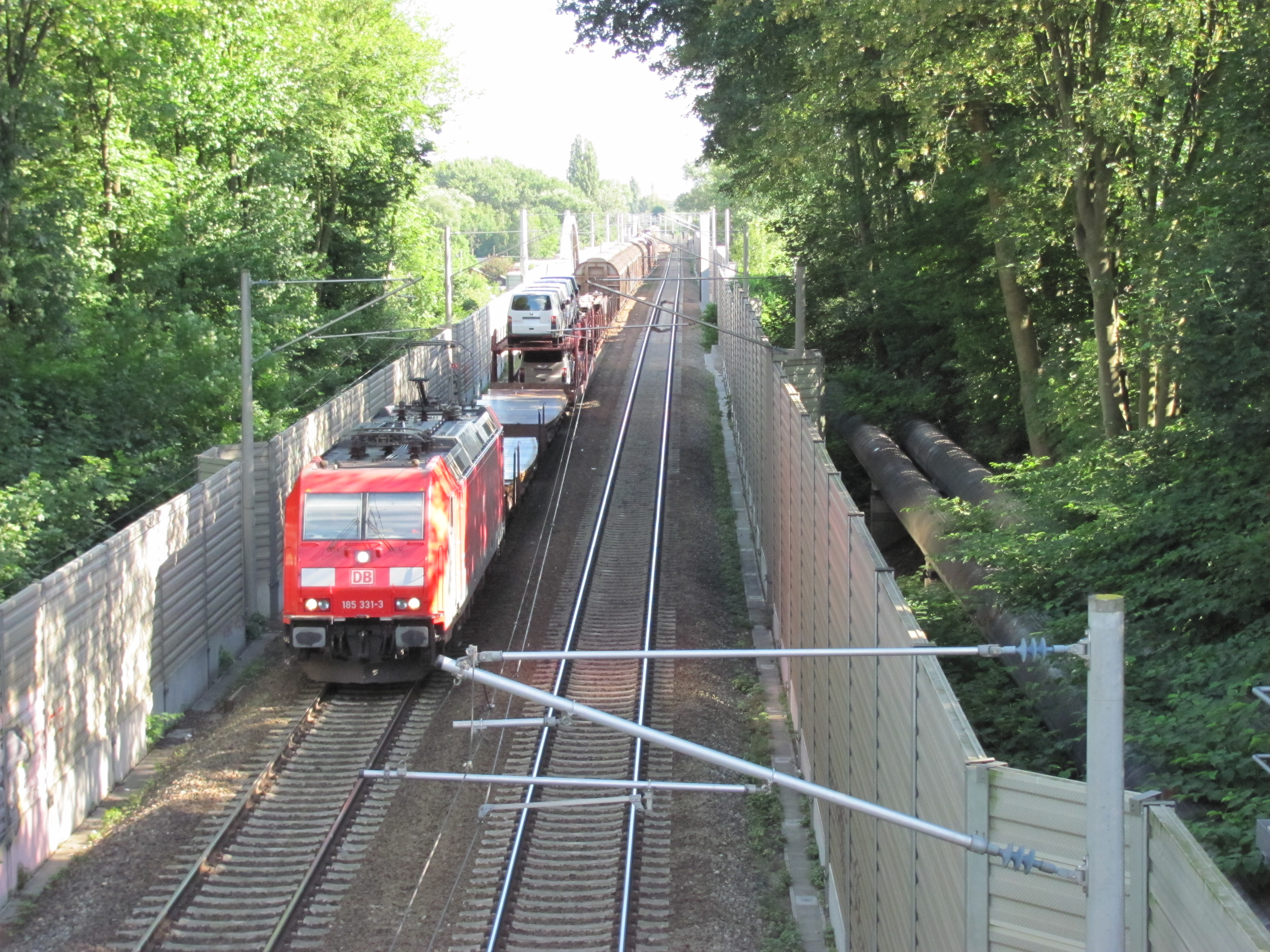
- A freight train on the bypass in 2011

Overview
- Native name: Güterumgehungsbahn
- Line number: 1234 (HH-Eidelstedt–HH-Rothenburgsort); 1280 (HH-Billwerder–Buchholz)
- Locale: Hamburg and Lower Saxony, Germany

Service
- Route number: 101.1

Technical
- Line length: 61.1 km (38.0 mi)
- Track gauge: 1,435 mm (4 ft 8 1/2 in) standard gauge
- Electrification: 15 kV/16.7 Hz AC overhead catenary
- Operating speed: 160 km/h (99 mph)

The Hamburg freight rail bypass (German: Güterumgehungsbahn) is a railway line in the German city of Hamburg. It runs from Hamburg-Eidelstedt via Hamburg-Rothenburgsort to Hamburg-Harburg and connects the long-distance railways approaching Hamburg, bypassing the link line and the railway junctions on the approaches to Hamburg-Altona station and Hamburg Hauptbahnhof. The line is mainly used for rail freight.

== History ==
The first part of the freight bypass was opened in 1902 by the Lübeck-Büchen Railway Company (Lübeck-Büchener Eisenbahn) as a link connecting Wandsbek station on the Lübeck–Hamburg railway and Rothenburgsort station on the Berlin–Hamburg railway. On 21 February 1903, the bypass was connected to Hamburg Hauptbahnhof via the main freight yard (Hauptgüterbahnhof) at the former Hannoverscher Bahnhof (the original terminal station on the line to Hanover). An extension to Ohlsdorf was completed from the link line before the First World War, along with the connection between Hamburg-Eidelstedt and Hamburg-Lokstedt.

During World War II, railway traffic was repeatedly interrupted through the Hamburg city centre by bombing and trains were diverted over the freight bypass. The embankment along the Kellinghusenstraße–Ohlsdorf branch of the U-Bahn had already been built during its construction, but lacked the bridges needed over the Alster and the Tarpenbek.

The ability to run directly between Rothenburgsort and the Elbe bridges (which previously required reversing in the main freight yard) was made possible by the building of new tracks to Harburg next to the existing line and a new bridge over the upper harbour and the closure of the former main freight yard. The new line was put in operation on 13 August 1996, so that the Maschen Marshalling Yard is now connected by the freight bypass track to Schleswig-Holstein. In 1997 the Great Belt Fixed Link was opened in Denmark, opening a ferry-free rail connection between Copenhagen and Hamburg, and that meant that all freight trains Denmark–Germany used the Hamburg freight rail bypass.

In 2009 work began on fitting the line between Groß Borstel and Alsterdorf with noise barriers for the relief of the local residents.

== Route ==
=== Northern freight train bypass ===
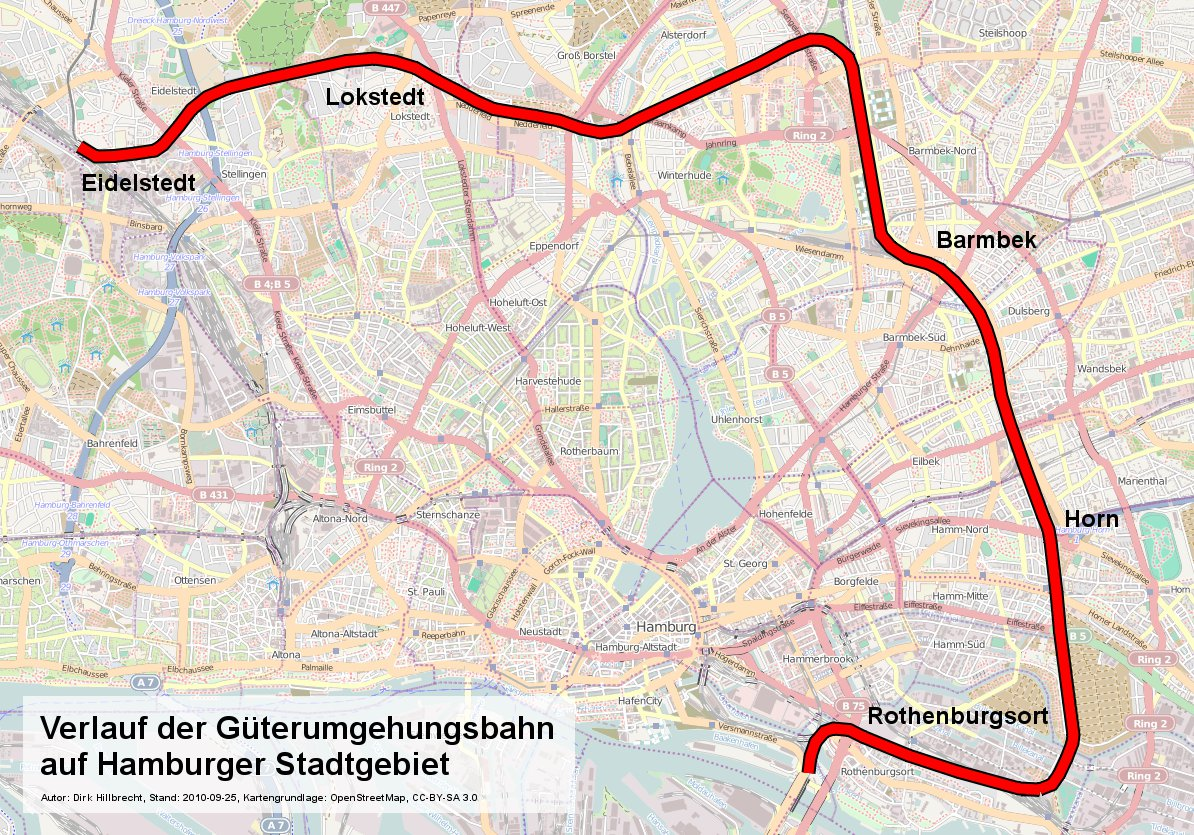
Route of the northern freight bypass

The northern freight bypass branches off between a former marshalling yard, now an Intercity-Express repair shop (Bahnbetriebswerk Hamburg-Eidelstedt), and Hamburg-Eidelstedt station and runs to the east of the line to Elmshorn. There was formerly a small freight yard in Hamburg-Lokstedt. A siding formerly connected to several major car dealers in Nedderfeld.

The line was planned from the beginning as a double-track line, but it was built only as a "temporary" single track, which is laid alternately on either side or in the middle of the reservation. It continues to the former Barmbek freight yard in the heights near Rübenkamp (City Nord) and Alte Wöhr S-Bahn stations. At Rübenkamp station a short branch line branches off to Hamburg-Ohlsdorf, connecting both to the Hamburg S-Bahn and the Hamburg U-Bahn. From Ohlsdorf a line ran on the east side of U-Bahn line U1 via Langenhorn to the former Ochsenzoll (Langenhorner Bahn) freight yard.

The freight bypass line continues to the south-southeast from Ohlsdorf as a single track to Hamburg-Horn junction, where it is joined by a connecting curve from Hamburg-Wandsbek station on the line to Lübeck. The northern part of the freight bypass ends at the former Hamburg-Rothenburgsort marshalling yard on the line to Berlin. Only a few tracks are used at all these stations and yards.

Following the upgrade of the Hamburg–Lübeck line, duplication of the 3.3 km long section between Horn and Rothenburgsort was completed at the end of 2007, including the widening of eight bridges. Between Horn and Eidelstedt the existing track is to be redeveloped, which will allow higher speeds, but requires no planning approval process. Noise emissions on this section are to be improved as part of a federal noise abatement program.

=== Ohlsdorf siding ===
In Ohlsdorf there was also a small freight yard, the site of which is used by Hamburger Hochbahn to hold stock. South of it there is a track connection to the Hamburg S-Bahn. Since the Alster Valley Railway had no separate freight track, the freight formerly operated on it ran over the S-Bahn tracks. In addition, the Hamburg-Ohlsdorf S-Bahn depot is connected to the railway network.

North of Ohlsdorf U-Bahn and S-Bahn station the freight track ran beside the Langenhorn line (Langenhorner Bahn) of the U-Bahn to the original terminus at Ochsenzoll. Today, the only tracks north of Ohlsdorf station is the U-Bahn line. The long-disused track to Ochsenzoll was completely dismantled by 2008. Part of the route was used for building the Hamburg Airport S-Bahn line.

The track between Barmbek freight yard and the main U-Bahn workshop was dismantled in 2005. During World War II, this track was extended to the premises of the important wartime lathe manufacturer Heidenreich & Harbeck.

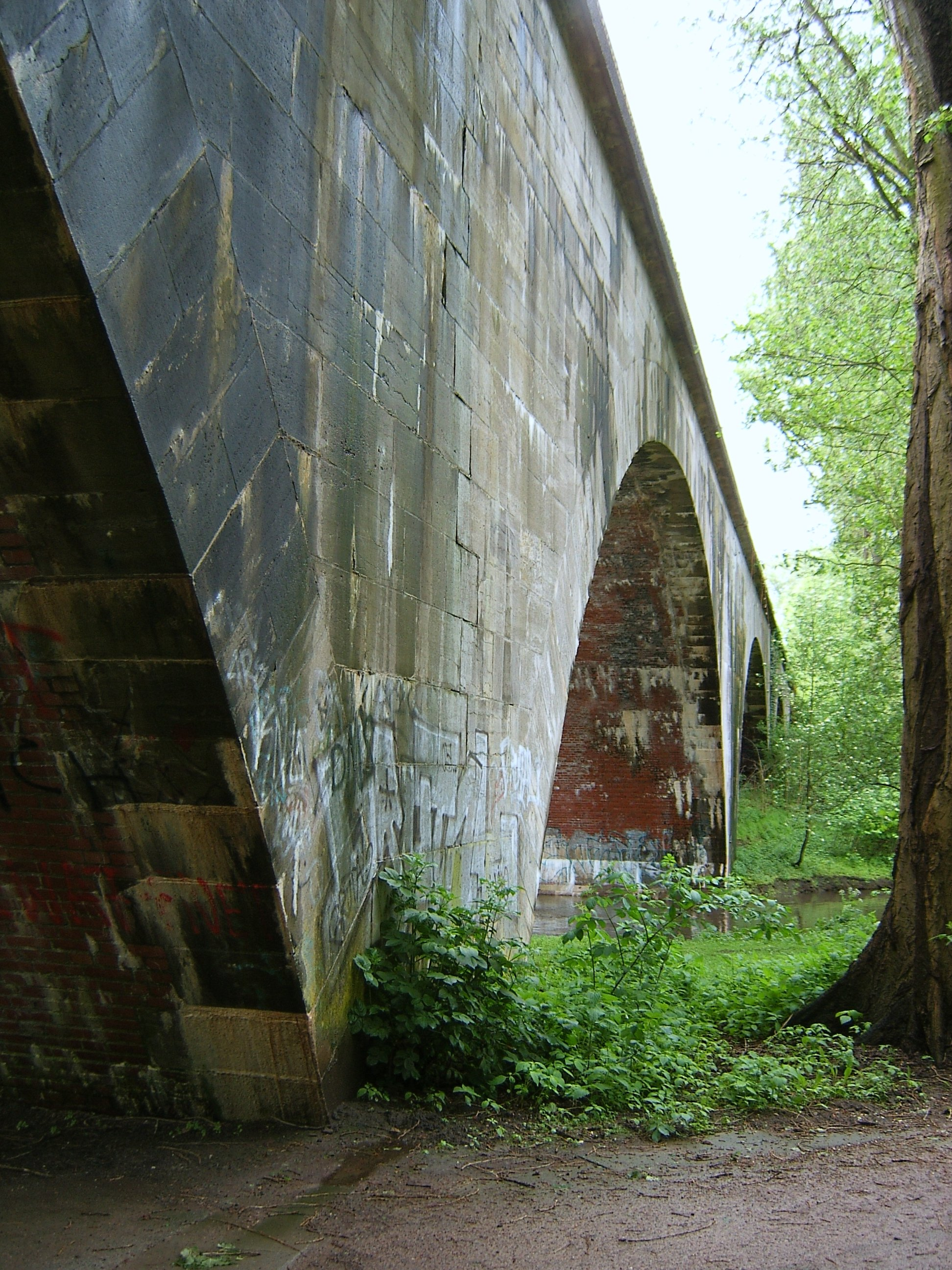
Bridge over the Tarpenbek

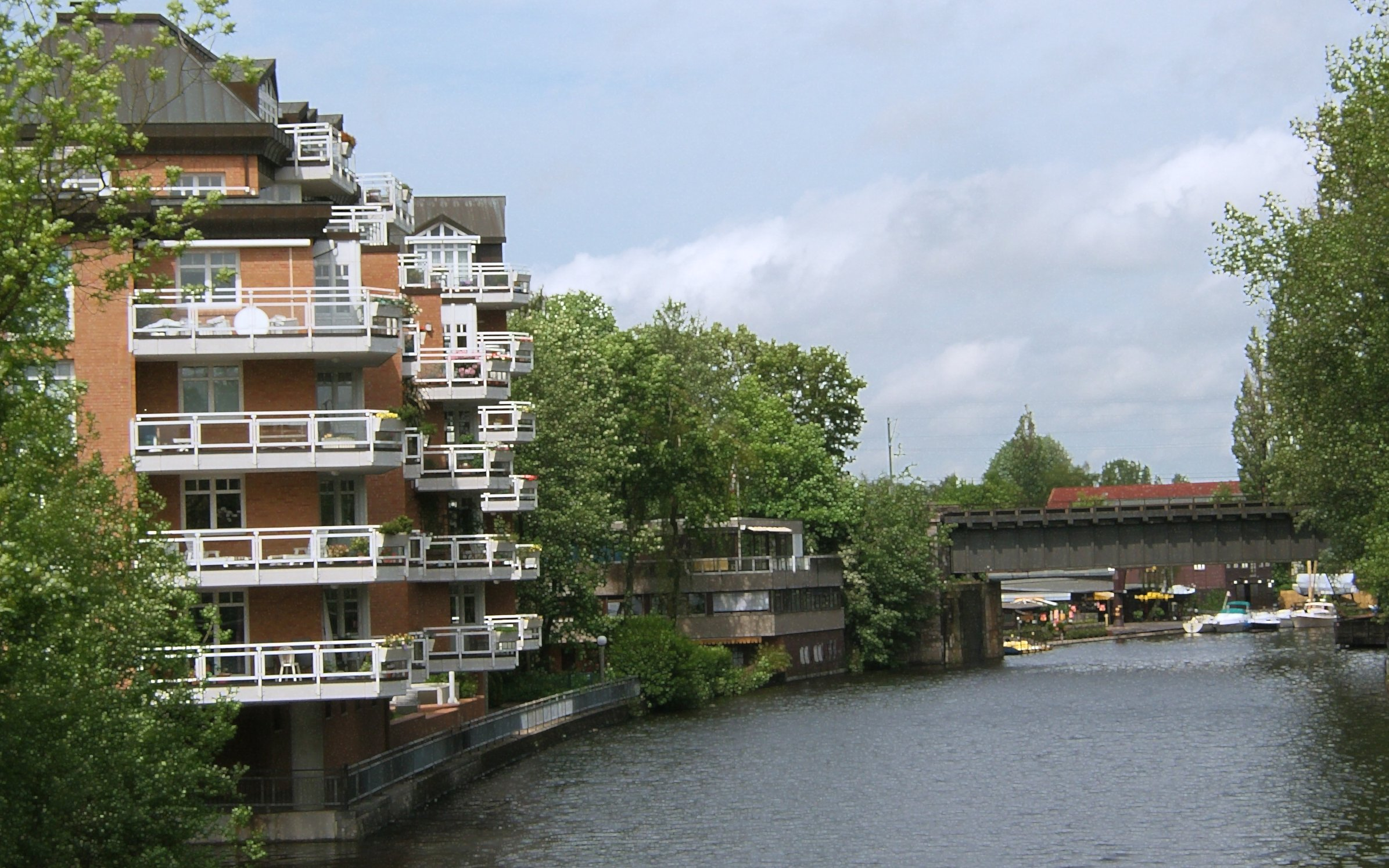
Bridge over the Alster

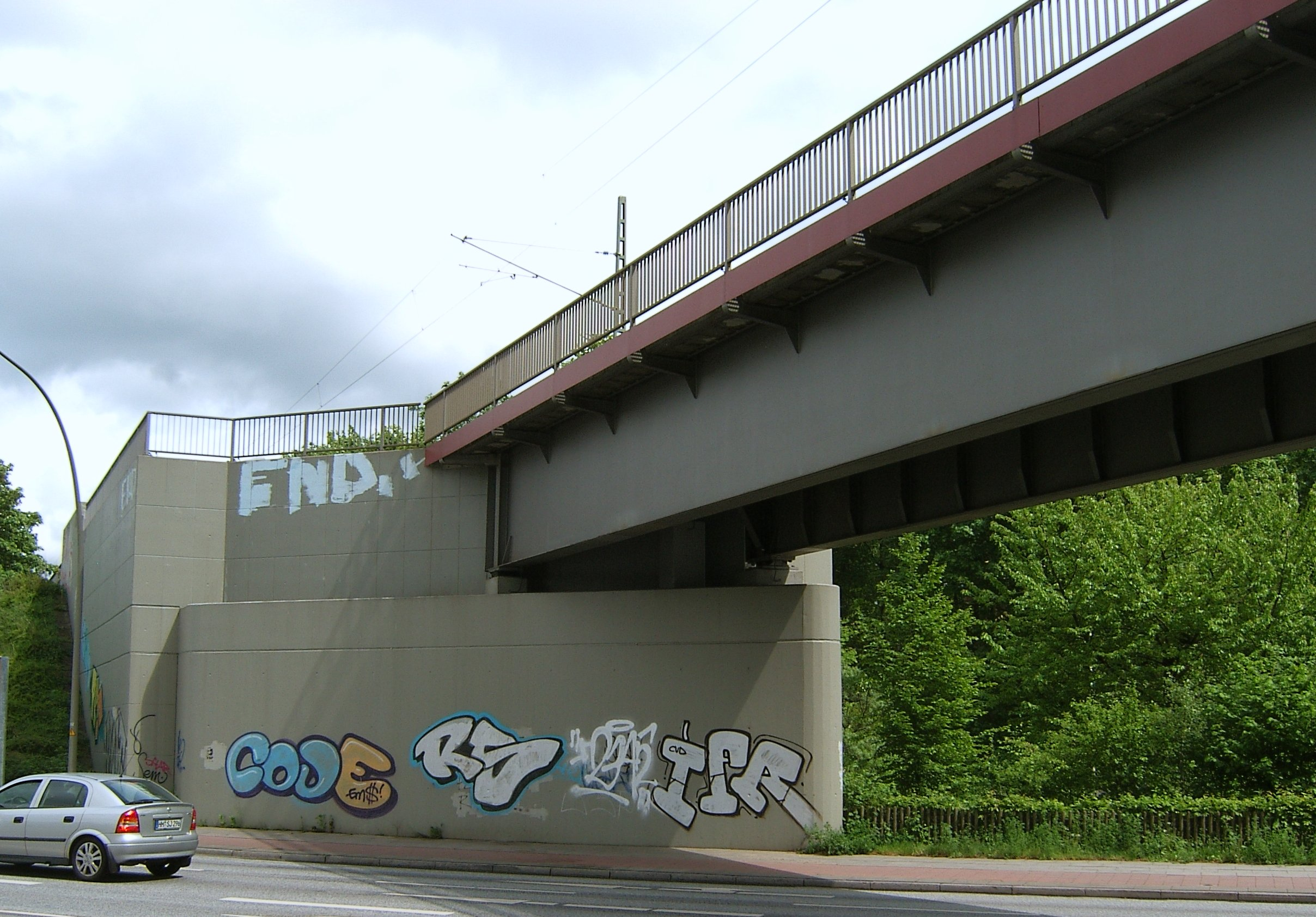
New bridge over the Bebelallee

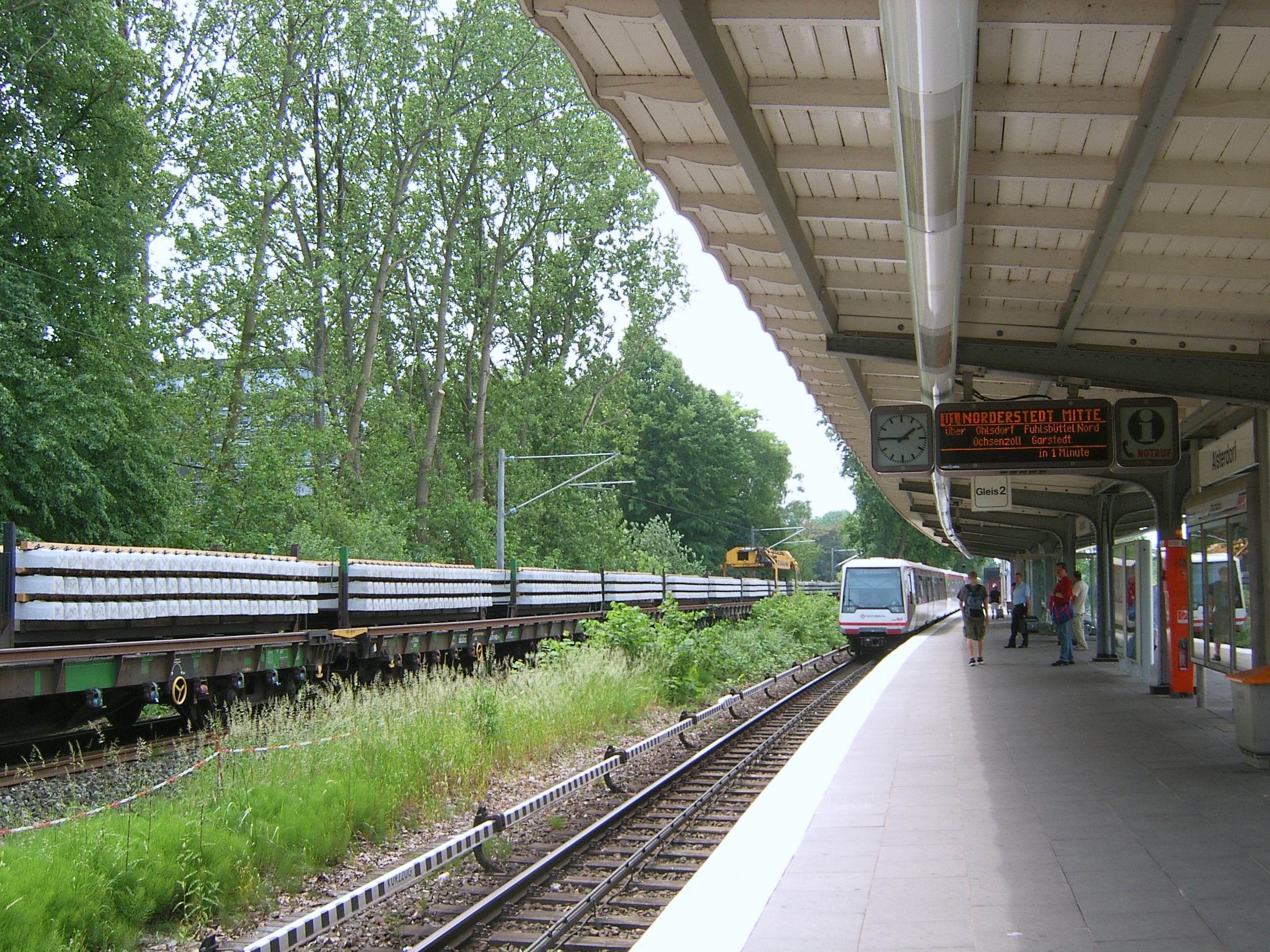
Renewal of the freight bypass railway next to Alsterdorf U-Bahn station

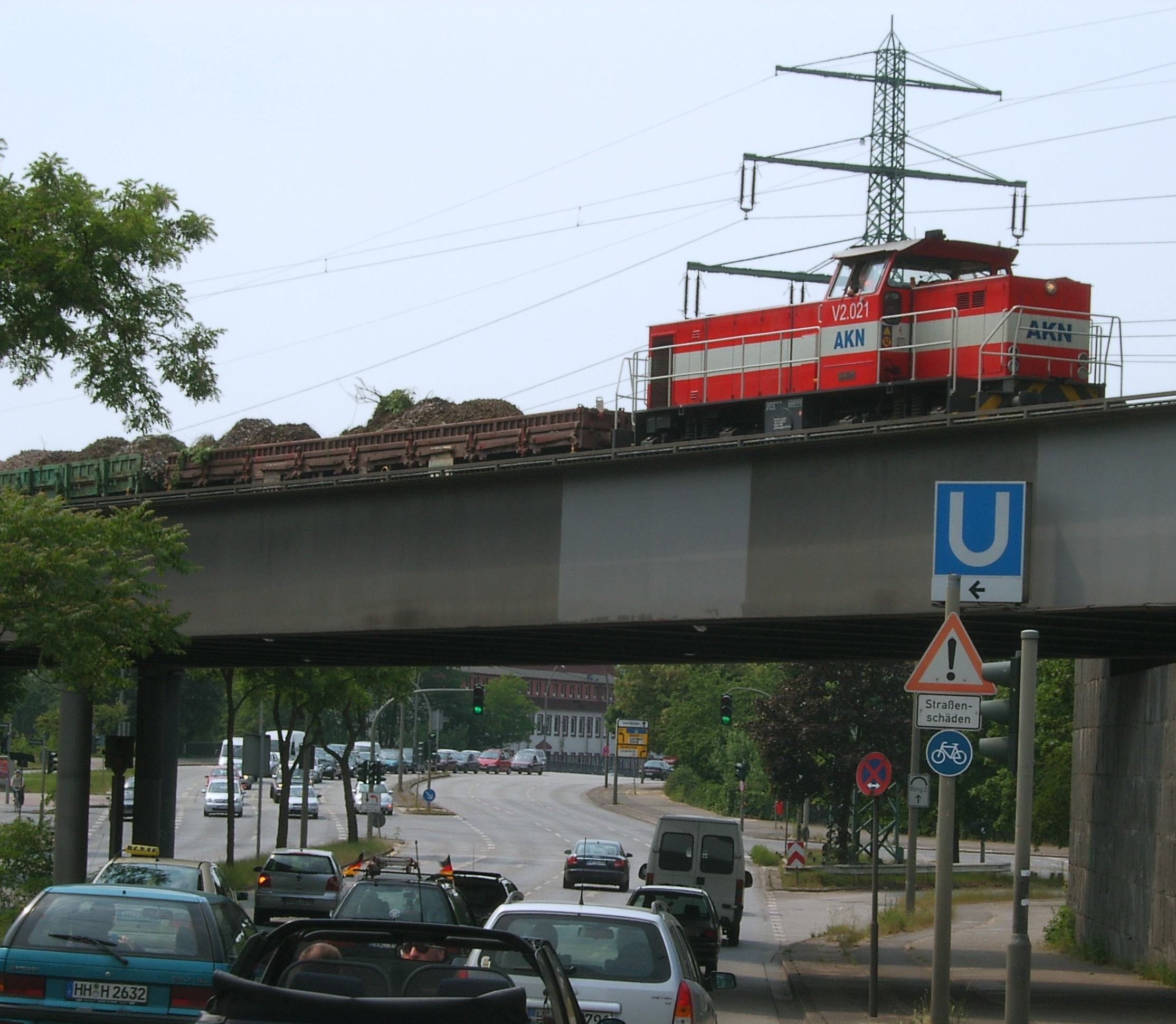
Bridge over the Ring Road 2, running next to U-Bahn line U1

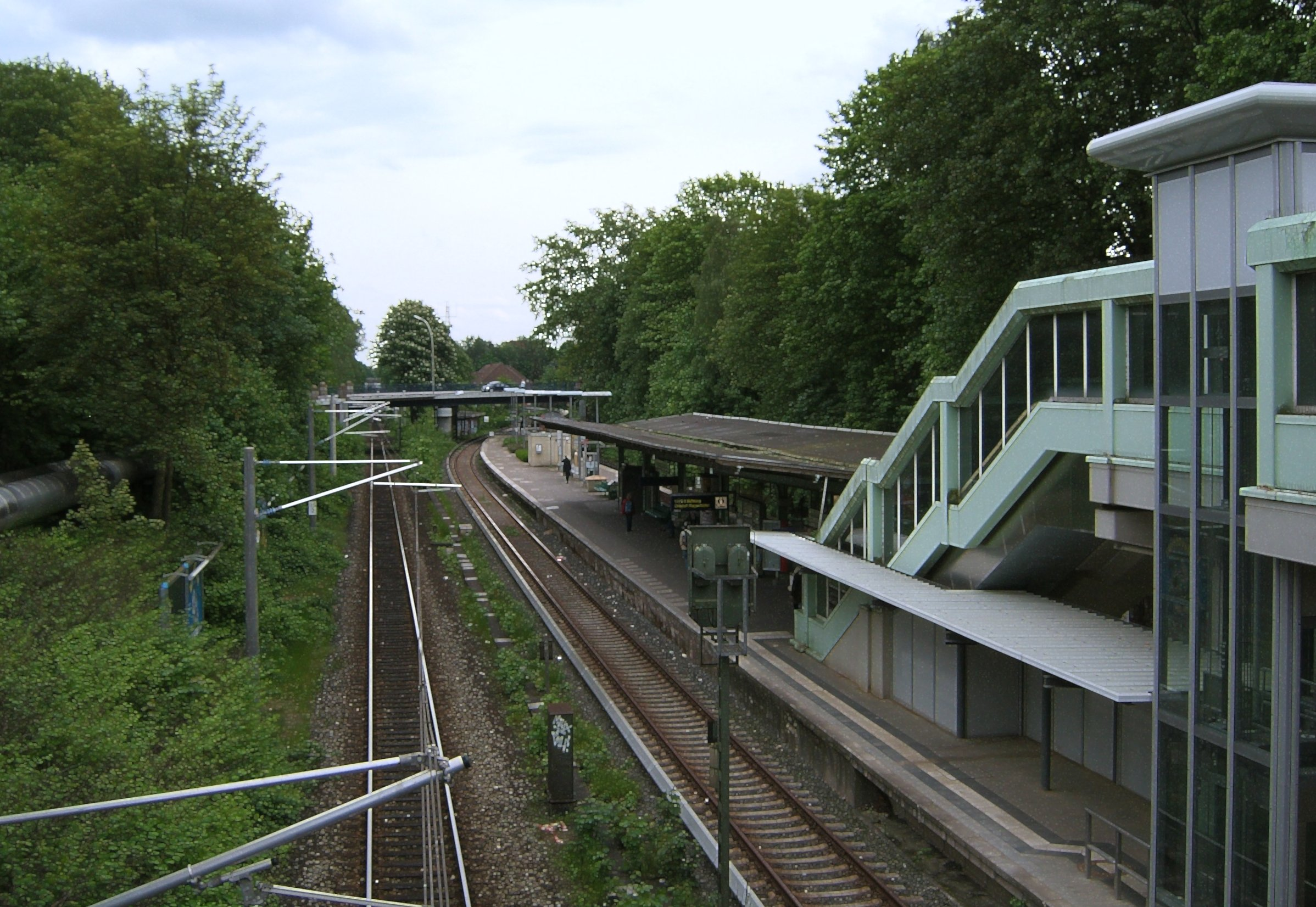
Wandsbeker Chaussee S-Bahn station

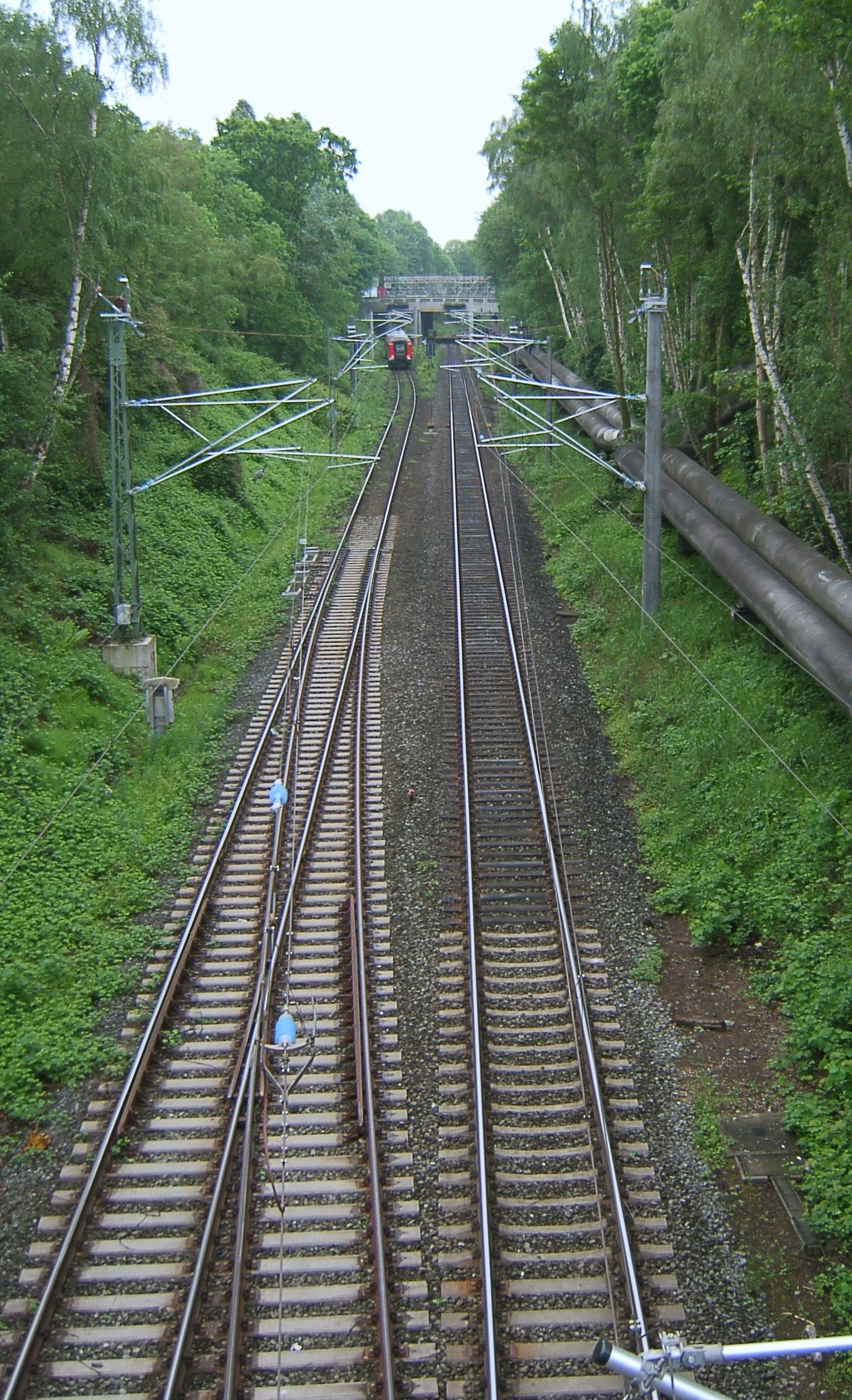
Junction with line from Lübeck and Horn operations depot (looking to the south)

=== Southern freight train bypass ===
The southern part of the freight bypass railway had been planned since the 1920s branching at the existing junction north of Tiefstack and from 1993 branching at the Hamburg-Billwerder freight yard, which had been adapted for combined transport, to the Berlin line as a new line in a wide arc through the marshlands continuing to Harburg to the south to join the existing lines to Hanover and Bremen. This link was reported in 1985 in the federal transport infrastructure plans as a line connecting Hamburg-Harburg and Hamburg-Rothenburgsort, but without a specific route. After it was determined that a new route through the environmentally sensitive Vierlande (four lands) and Marschlande (marsh lands) could not be built, the current line was built between 1987 and 1996.

The essential elements (from south to north) of this rail line are:

- the construction of a new double-track freight line with a grade-separated crossing of the Hamburg–Hanover line between the northern end of the Maschen marshalling yard and Hamburg-Harburg,
- the reconstruction of the Hamburg-Harburg station to allow the at-grade crossing of Hamburg–Bremen and Hanover–Hamburg passenger trains,
- increasing operating speeds in the following routes:
  - Hamburg–Hanover to 120 km/h,
  - Hamburg–Bremen to 100 km/h,
  - Maschen–Hamburg Unterelbe to 60 km/h and
  - Maschen–Hamburg -Wilhelmsburg to 80 km/h
- the construction between Hamburg-Harburg and Veddel junction of another double-track line with a new double-track bridge over the Süderelbe (southern Elbe) to connect to the marshalling yards of Hamburg-Hohe Schaar and Hamburg Süd,
- the rearrangement of the tracks between Hamburg-Harburg and the former Hamburg main freight yard (Hamburg Hgbf):
  - old:
    - two passenger tracks to the east,
    - two freight tracks to the west,
  - new:
    - two freight tracks to the east,
    - two central passenger tracks,
    - two port freight tracks to the west,
- the abandonment of the freight train turning system in Hamburg main freight yard and the rearrangement and simplification of the track layout,
- the construction of a double-track link between the north Elbe bridge and Hamburg-Rothenburgsort station with a bridge over the upper harbour canal,
- the dismantling of the existing double track line connecting the former main freight yard and Hamburg-Rothenburgsort,
- the rebuilding of platform track 8 in Hamburg Hauptbahnhof to connect towards Lübeck and the (new) Hamburg-Harburg line, including an extension of the platform between tracks 7 and 8,
- the extension of the Süderelbe junction interlocking zone, which is now remotely controlled from the modernised signal box in Hamburg-Harburg (and the dismantling of Sf signal box). Veddel Vf, Hob and Wr IV (in the former Hamburg main freight yard) signal boxes are now also controlled from Hamburg-Harburg and Hob and Wr IV signal boxes have been dismantled.

After German reunification a new single track was built next to the old line between the former Hamburg main freight yard and Hamburg-Rothenburgsort so that trains running between Hamburg and Berlin could use all platforms in Hamburg Hbf (tracks 5–8 and 11–14).

== Traffic ==
It is part of the main freight route between Scandinavia and Germany. When the Fehmarn Fixed Link opens in 2028 the main freight route will be using that link, and the Hamburg freight rail bypass will be used only for a short part. The Fehmarn Fixed Link is delayed multiple years by people who worry about noise along its connecting line, especially leisure home near Timmendorf Beach, without mentioning the noise along the Hamburg freight rail bypass and further northwest.

In addition to freight trains, Intercity trains run regularly on the line between the Hamburg-Eidelstedt workshop (Bahnbetriebswerk) and Hamburg Hauptbahnhof, but as empty trains without passengers. Long-distance trains run between Rothenburgsort and Hamburg-Horn on the freight bypass from and to Lübeck, if they are using platform tracks 11–14 in the western part of Hamburg station. In addition, it is used by passenger services during occasional disruptions on other lines.
