= Kollau =

River in Germany

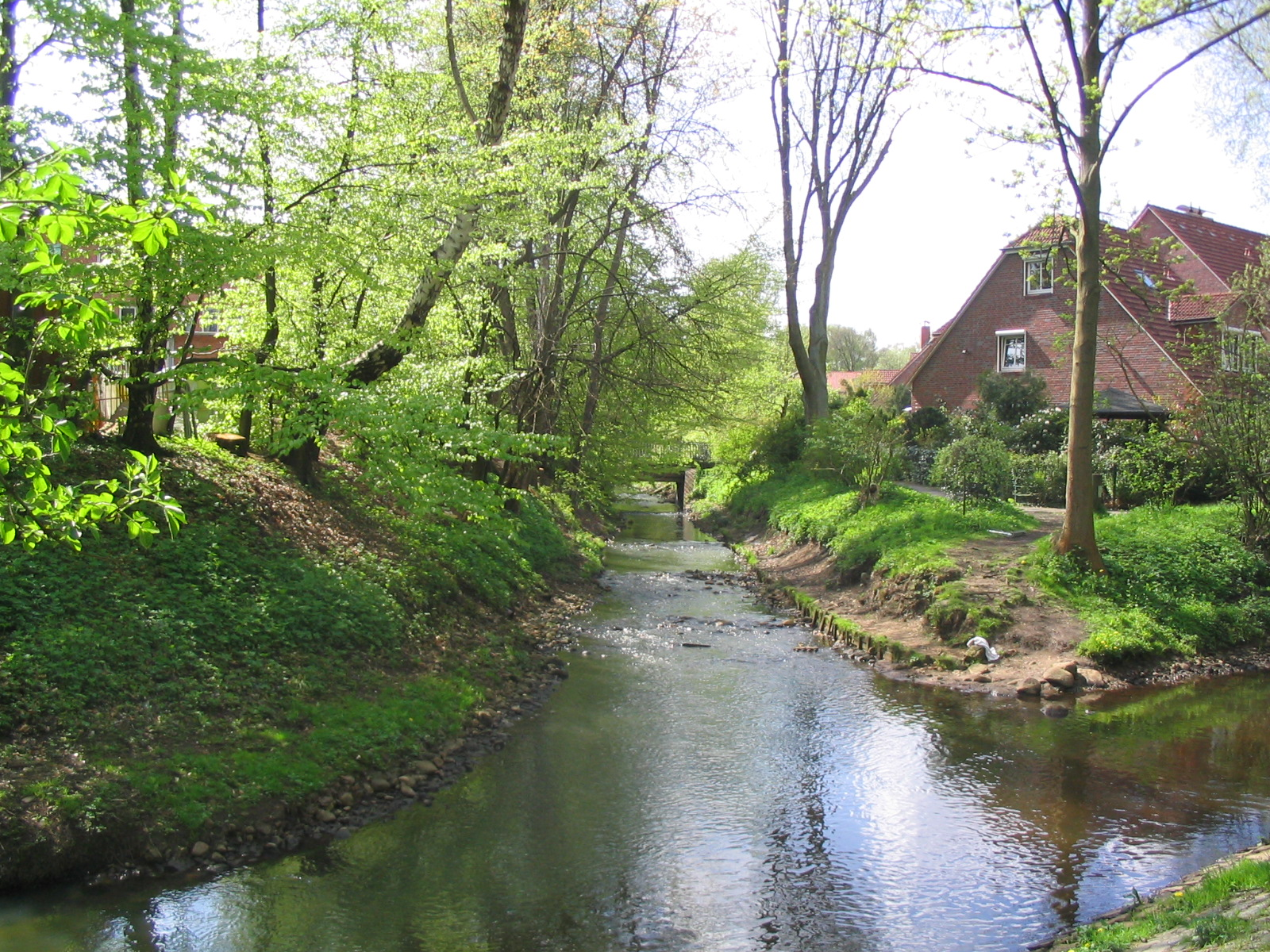

Location
- Country: Germany
- States: Hamburg

Physical characteristics
- Mouth
  - location: Tarpenbek
  - coordinates: 53.6057°N 9.9661°E
- Length: 8 km (5.0 mi)

Basin features
- Progression: Tarpenbek→ Alster→ Elbe→ North Sea

Kollau (German pronunciation: [ˈkɔlaʊ]) is a small river of Hamburg, Germany. It flows into the Tarpenbek near Hamburg-Lokstedt.

== See also ==
- List of rivers of Hamburg
