= Hamburg-Rahlstedt station =

Railway station in Hamburg, Germany

Hamburg-Rahlstedt

General information
- Location: Rahlstedter Bahnhofstraße; 22143 Hamburg-Rahlstedt; Hamburg; Germany
- Coordinates: 53.6048°N 10.1544°E
- Owner: Deutsche Bahn
- Operator: DB Station&Service
- Lines: Lübeck–Hamburg railway (KBS 104)
- Platforms: 1 island platform
- Tracks: 2
- Train operators: DB Regio Nord
- Connections: RB 81; 9 24 26 162 163 164 168 264 275 362 364 368 462 562 608

Construction
- Parking: yes
- Cycle facilities: yes
- Accessible: yes

Other information
- Station code: 2521
- DS100 code: ARAL
- IBNR: 8002558
- Category: 4
- Fare zone: HVV: B/305
- Website: www.bahnhof.de

History
- Opened: 1868
- Rebuilt: October 1893 (present building)
- Electrified: 13 December 2008; 17 years ago
- Former names: Alt-Rahlstedt (till 31 March 1938)

Services
Preceding station	DB Regio Nord	Following station
Hamburg-Tonndorf towards Hamburg Hbf	RB 81	Ahrensburg towards Bad Oldesloe
Location
- Location within Hamburg Location within Schleswig-Holstein Location within Germany Location within Europe

Hamburg-Rahlstedt station (German: Bahnhof Hamburg-Rahlstedt) is a railway station in the Rahlstedt district in the city of Hamburg, Germany.
