= Lübeck–Hamburg railway =

Mainline railway in northern Germany

Lübeck–Hamburg
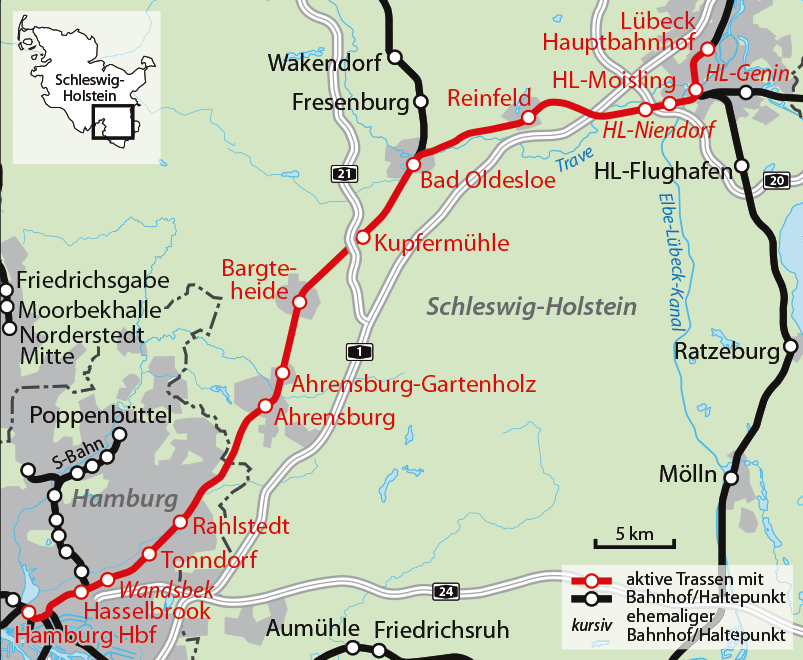
- The Lübeck–Hamburg line

Overview
- Line number: 1120
- Locale: Schleswig-Holstein and Hamburg

Service
- Route number: 104, 140

Technical
- Line length: 62.8 km (39.0 mi)
- Track gauge: 1,435 mm (4 ft 8 1/2 in) standard gauge
- Electrification: 15 kV/16.7 Hz AC overhead catenary

The Hamburg–Lübeck railway is one of the most important mainline railways of the German states of Schleswig-Holstein and Hamburg. It connects the two Hanseatic cities of Hamburg and Lübeck, and is part of the line to Denmark. The line was opened in 1865.

== Route ==
The line runs the south-west from Lübeck through mostly agricultural, undulating land. The Trave river is crossed three times. The most important intermediate stop is Bad Oldesloe, where the line connects with hourly services on the line to Bad Segeberg and Neumünster, operated by Nordbahn. Between Ahrensburg and Hamburg-Rahlstedt the line runs along the Stellmoor tunnel valley. In the city of Hamburg the line crosses the rail freight bypass and then runs parallel to the S-Bahn line until Hamburg Hauptbahnhof is reached from the east.

== History ==
The first plans to build a direct rail link between Hamburg and Lübeck were put forward in 1831. Because of the refusal of the Danish authorities to allow a direct line to be built through Holstein-Glückstadt, which was ruled by the King of Denmark, the Lübeck–Büchen line was built by the Lübeck-Büchen Railway Company (Lübeck-Büchener Eisenbahn, LBE). This provided a connection between Lübeck and the Berlin-Hamburg railway, but meant that trains to Hamburg had to take the route via Büchen. This was approximately 32 km (20 mi) longer that the direct line, which was only opened by the LBE on 1 August 1865. In 1875/76 the track was duplicated.

In 1963, the Lübeck–Puttgarden and Rødby Havn–Copenhagen lines were completed as part of the Vogelfluglinie (literally: bird flight line) to Copenhagen. This increased the range of long distance trains between Lübeck and Hamburg. In addition to the trains to Copenhagen there were Interzone trains (trains between East and West Germany) to Rostock. Express trains, the Merkur Trans Europ Express and Trans-Europ-Express-Marchandises freight trains were hauled to Puttgarden by the class DB-221 diesel locomotives.

In the 1960s and 1970s express trains in push-pull operations were hauled by class DB-220 diesel locomotives.

The Travemünde–Lübeck and the Lübeck–Hamburg lines were electrified in 2008. Electric operation began from the timetable change in December 2008. Since that time, Intercity-Express trains have also operated between Munich, Hamburg and Lübeck.

== Operations ==
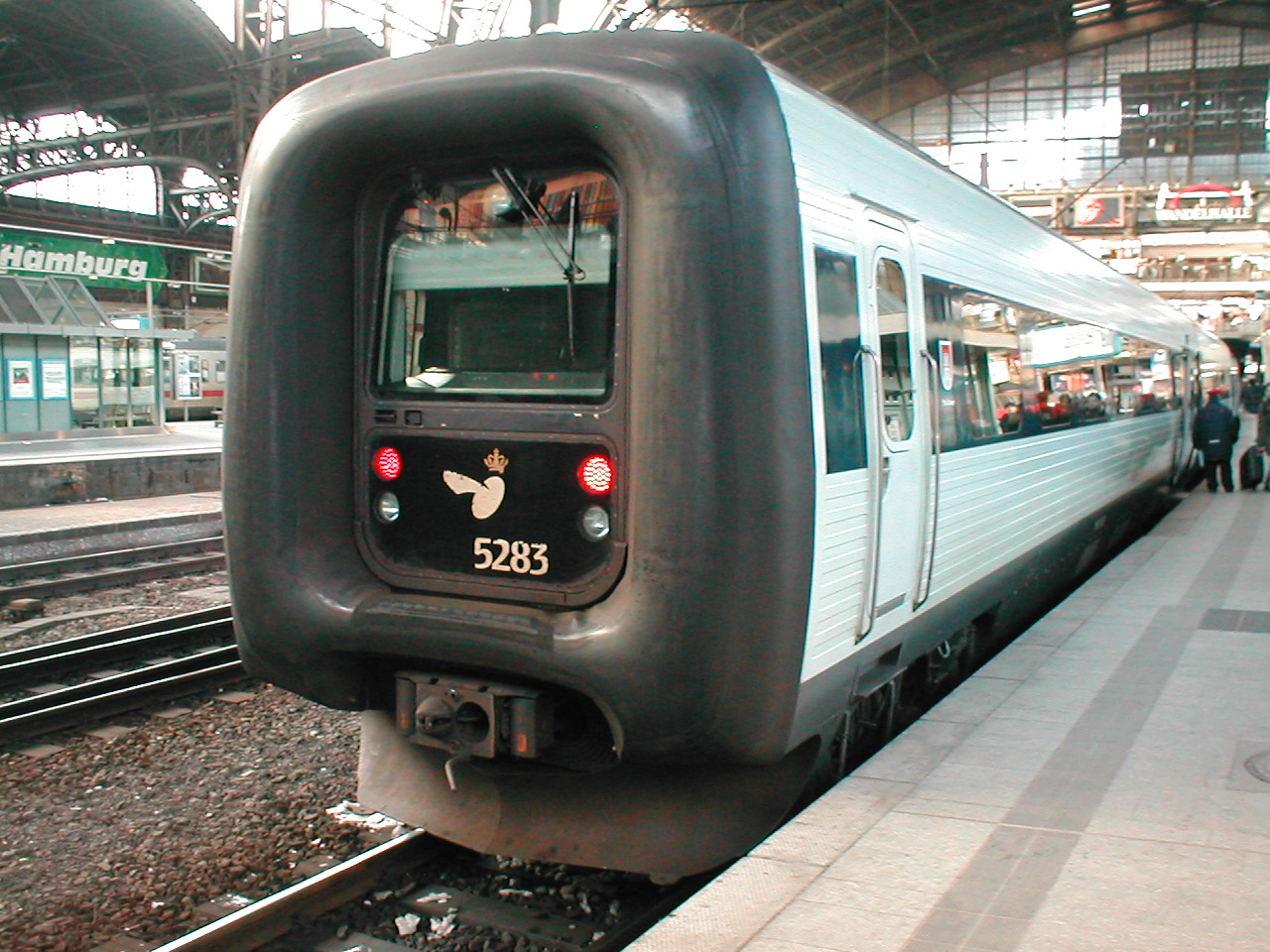
IC3 of the DSB in Hamburg Hauptbahnhof

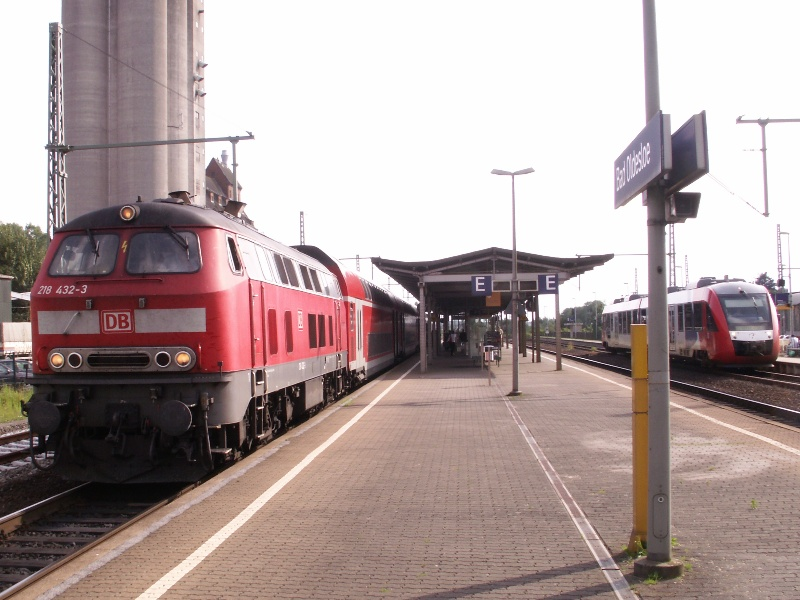
Lübeck–Hamburg Regional-Express in Bad Oldesloe station

The construction of the Great Belt Bridge between Funen and Zealand significantly reduced long-distance rail traffic on the Hamburg–Lübeck–Copenhagen route. Since December 2007 Deutsche Bahn ICE TD (withdrawn from 2016) and DSB IC3 trains have operated on the route.

Between Lübeck and Hamburg Regional-Express trains run every twice an hour from morning to evening from Monday to Friday and hourly on weekends. This section has the greatest number of train passengers in Schleswig-Holstein. The Regional-Express trains stop only in Reinfeld, Bad Oldesloe and at times in Ahrensburg. Regionalbahn trains operate on the Hamburg–Bad Oldesloe section, stopping at all stations. They are almost always composed of double-decker coaches. They are propelled in push-pull mode by electric locomotives, either class 112 or 143.

Ahrensburg-Gartenholz halt was built between Ahrensburg and Bargteheide in 2009. It opened in 2010. The opening was delayed because the station had to be modified. Although international trains never stop there, they do pass through, so the station has to comply with international standards.

== Future ==
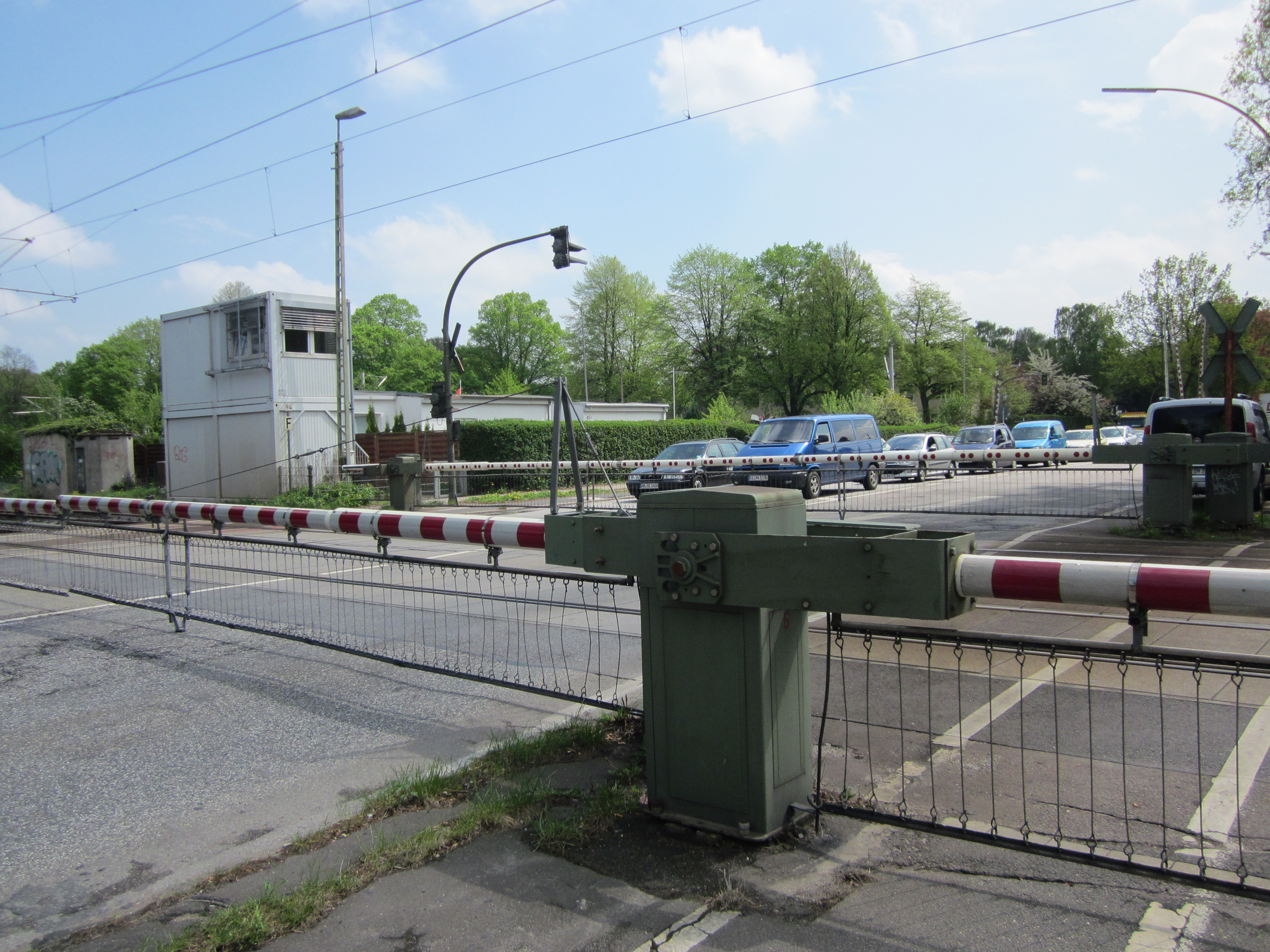
The level crossing in Marienthal will be replaced by an underpass.

Starting in 2017, the Hamburg–Bad Oldesloe section will be upgraded for Hamburg S-Bahn operations with new stations at Claudiusstraße, Bovestraße, Holstenhofweg and Pulverhof. By 2018, the railway crossing at the Hammer Straße in Marienthal will be replaced by an underpass, which is seen as a prerequisite for the expansion of the S-Bahn.
