= Alte Wöhr station =

Railway station in Hamburg, Germany

Alte Wöhr
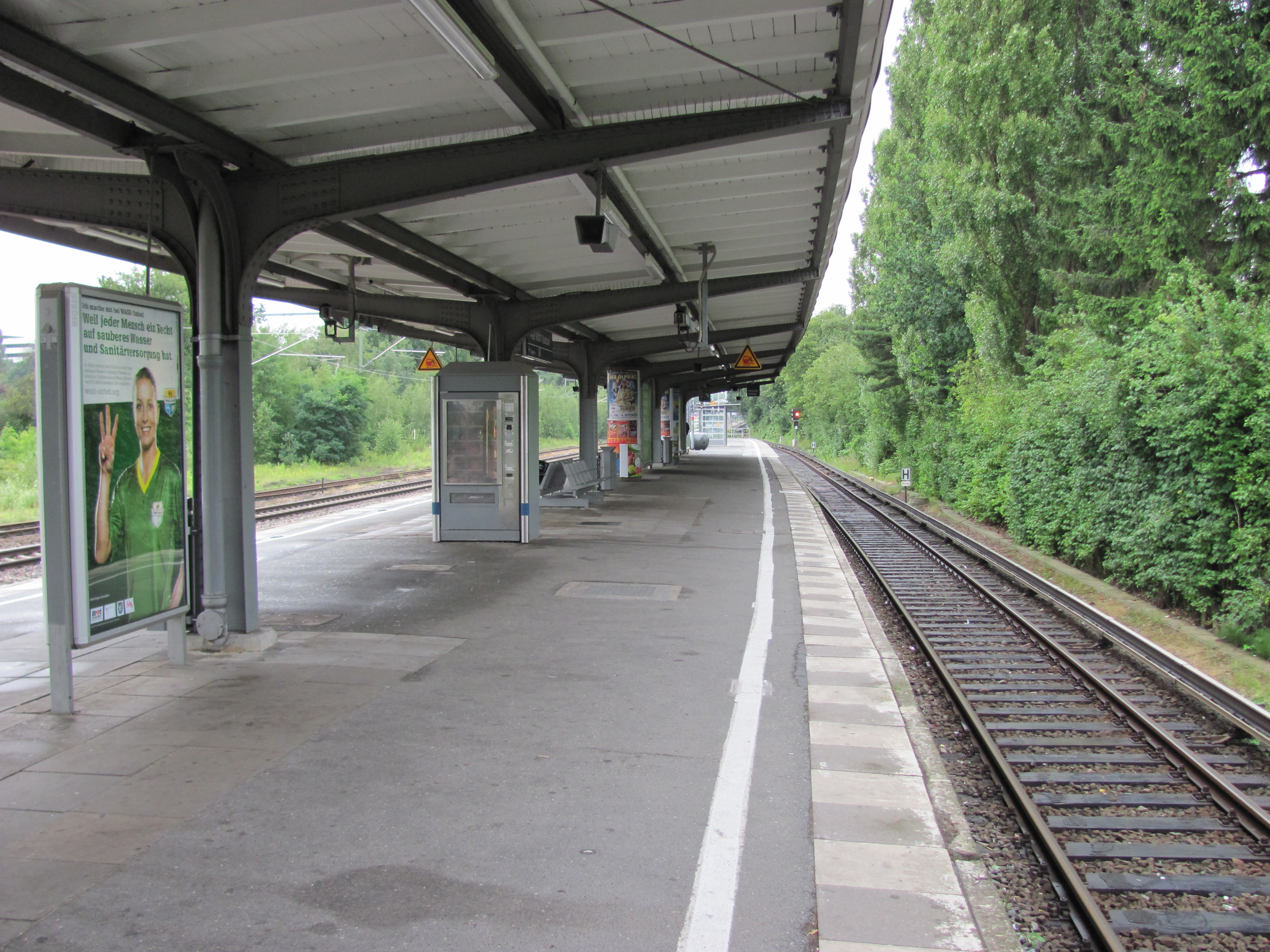

General information
- Location: Alte Wöhr 20; 22307 Hamburg, Germany
- Coordinates: 53°35′51″N 10°02′08″E
- System: Hamburg S-Bahn station
- Operator: S-Bahn Hamburg GmbH
- Line: S1
- Platforms: 1 island platform
- Tracks: 2
- Connections: Bus

Construction
- Structure type: Elevated

Other information
- Station code: ds100: AAW; DB: 0078
- Fare zone: HVV: A/103 and 105

History
- Opened: 29 April 1931; 95 years ago
- Electrified: 29 April 1931; 95 years ago, 6.3 kV AC system (overhead; turned off in 1955); 10 April 1941; 85 years ago, 1.2 kV DC system (3rd rail)
- Former names: 1931-1938 Alte Wöhr Stadtpark; 1938-1970 Stadtpark

Services
Preceding station	Hamburg S-Bahn	Following station
Barmbek towards Wedel	S1	Rübenkamp towards Poppenbüttel or Hamburg Airport
Location
- Location within Hamburg Location within Schleswig-Holstein Location within Germany Location within Europe

Alte Wöhr is a station on the Hamburg-Altona link line and served by the trains of Hamburg S-Bahn line S1. The station is also known as Alte Wöhr (Stadtpark), due to its proximity to Hamburg Stadtpark. It was opened in 1931 and is located in the Hamburg district of Barmbek-Nord, Germany. Barmbek-Nord is part of the borough of Hamburg-Nord.

== History ==
The station was opened in 1931, then by the name "Stadtpark". On May 31, 1970, the name was changed to "Alte Wöhr".

== Service ==
The line S1 of Hamburg S-Bahn call at Alte Wöhr station.

== Gallery ==
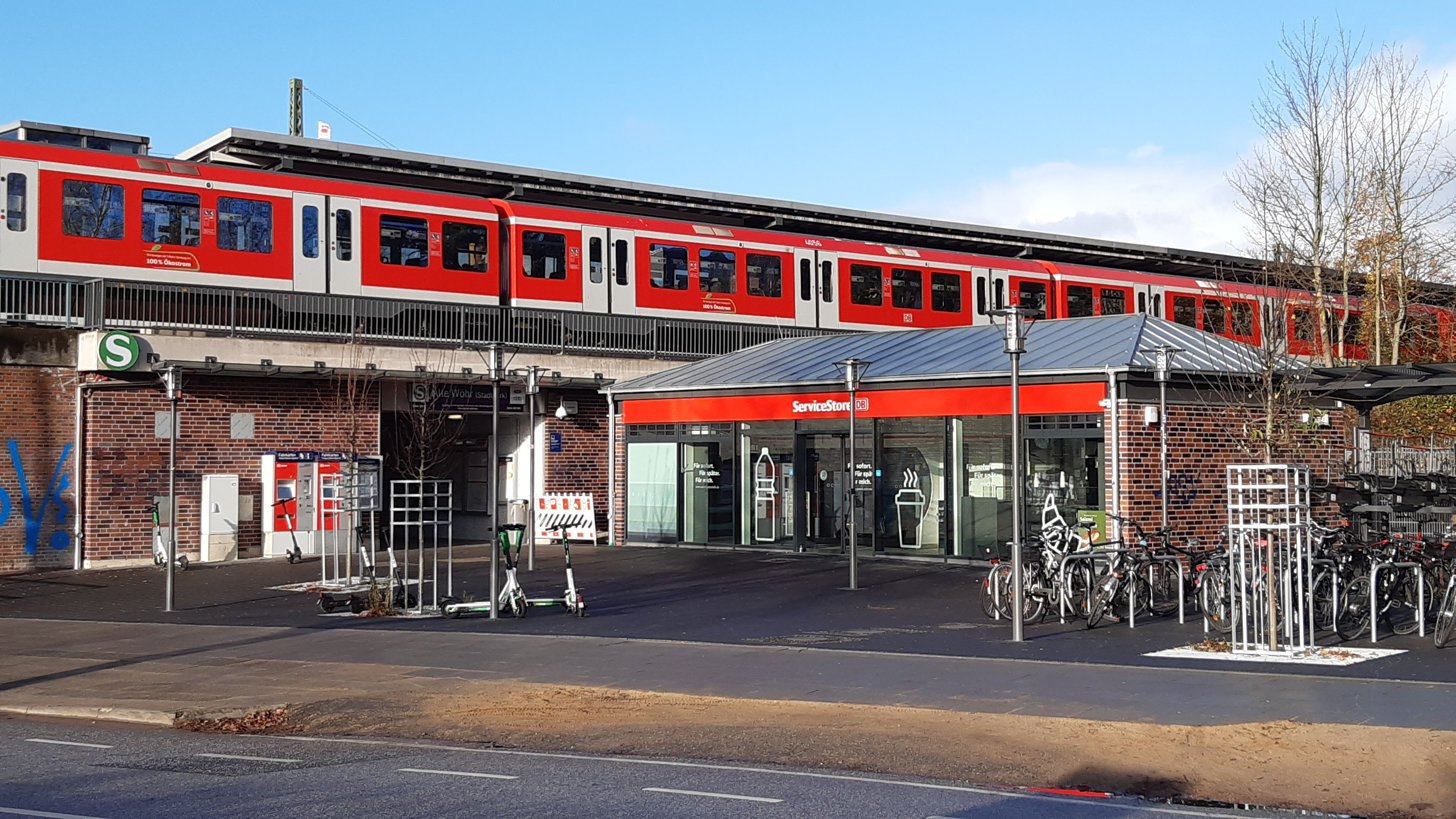
The station's entrance

== See also ==
- Hamburger Verkehrsverbund (HVV)
- List of Hamburg S-Bahn stations
