= Buckhorn =

Buckhorn may refer to:

== Places ==
=== Canada ===
- Buckhorn, Ontario

=== Germany ===
- Buckhorn (Hamburg U-Bahn station), in Hamburg-Volksdorf

=== United Kingdom ===
- Buckhorn, Devon, a United Kingdom location
- Buckhorn Weston, Dorset

=== United States ===
- Buckhorn, Amador County, California
- Buckhorn, Ventura County, California
- Buckhorn, Illinois
- Buckhorn, Kentucky
- Buckhorn, Michigan
- Buckhorn, Madison County, Missouri
- Buckhorn, Pulaski County, Missouri
- Buckhorn, North Carolina
- Buckhorn, Pennsylvania
- Buckhorn Township (disambiguation)

== People ==
- Bob Buckhorn (born 1958) American politician

== Other uses ==
- A type of iron sight on a firearm
- A common name of the perennial herb Plantago lanceolata
- A horn made from a buck, literally "buckhorn" in English, but on Wikipedia as Bukkehorn (Swedish version of word)

== See also ==
- Buckhorn Lake (disambiguation)
- Buckhorn High School (Alabama)
