= Volksdorf station =

Railway station in Volksdorf, Germany

Volksdorf
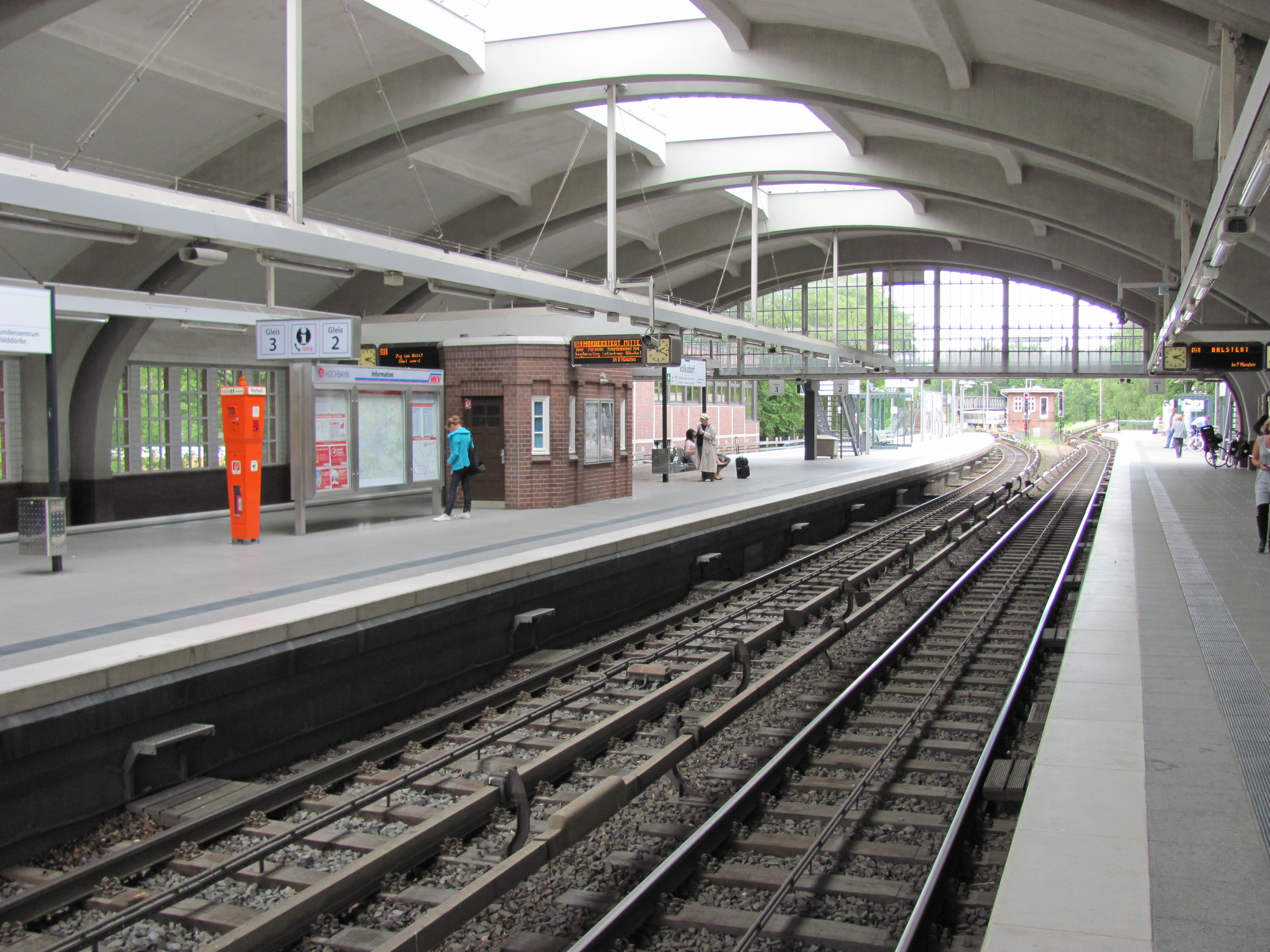

General information
- Location: Claus-Ferck-Straße; 22359 Hamburg, Germany
- Coordinates: 53°39′02″N 10°09′47″E
- System: Hamburg U-Bahn station
- Operator: Hamburger Hochbahn AG
- Line: U1
- Platforms: 1 island platform, 1 side platform
- Tracks: 3
- Connections: Bus, Taxi

Construction
- Structure type: Elevated
- Parking: Park and Ride (370 slots)
- Accessible: Yes

Other information
- Station code: HHA: VF
- Fare zone: HVV: B/304, 305, 404, and 405

History
- Opened: 6 September 1920; 105 years ago
- Closed: 22 May 1919 - 6 September 1920
- Electrified: 6 September 1920; 105 years ago

Services
Preceding station	Hamburg U-Bahn	Following station
Meiendorfer Weg towards Norderstedt Mitte	U1	Buckhorn towards Ohlstedt
Meiendorfer Weg towards Norderstedt Mitte	U1	Buchenkamp towards Großhansdorf
Location
- Location within Hamburg Location within Germany

Volksdorf is a rapid transit station on the Hamburg U-Bahn line U1. Volksdorf is the last station on the U1's main line, and branch-off station for the U1's Ohlstedt and Großhansdorf branches. The station is located in the Hamburg suburb of Volksdorf, Germany. Volksdorf is part of the Hamburg borough of Wandsbek.

== History ==
At the time the station was opened in 1918, Volksdorf was an exclave of the Free and Hanseatic City of Hamburg. Back then, Volksdorf station was part of the Walddörferbahn. In February 1925 the station was electrified and integrated into the Hochbahn (U-Bahn) system.

== Layout ==
The elevated station is located on the western side of Claus-Ferck-Straße; the station's main entrance is located at the junction of Claus-Ferck-Straße and Farmsenser Landstraße. The station hall above the entrance consists of one island platform, one side platform and three rail tracks. The concrete beam station hall was built in 1920. Volksdorf station was renovated in 1957 and again between 1997 and 2001. Since 2001 the station is handicap-accessible.

== Service ==
=== Trains ===
Volksdorf is served by Hamburg U-Bahn line U1; departures into the inner-city are every 10 minutes, during rush hour every 5 minutes; departures to both Ohlstedt and Großhansdorf are exactly half as frequent. The travel time to Hamburg Hauptbahnhof is about 29 minutes.

== Gallery ==
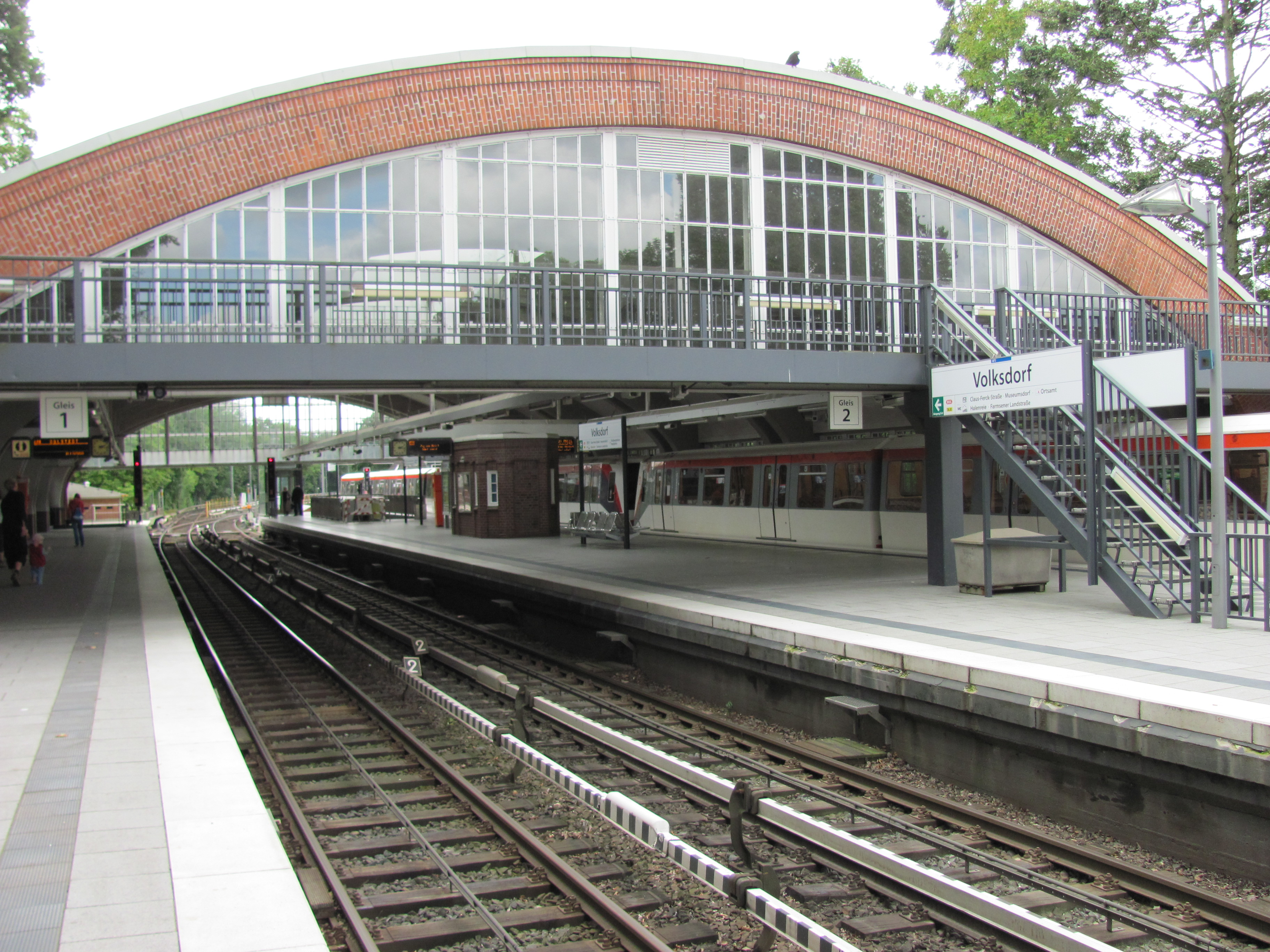
Exterior of the station hall

== See also ==
- List of Hamburg U-Bahn stations
