= Meiendorfer Weg station =

Railway station in Hamburg, Germany

Meiendorfer Weg
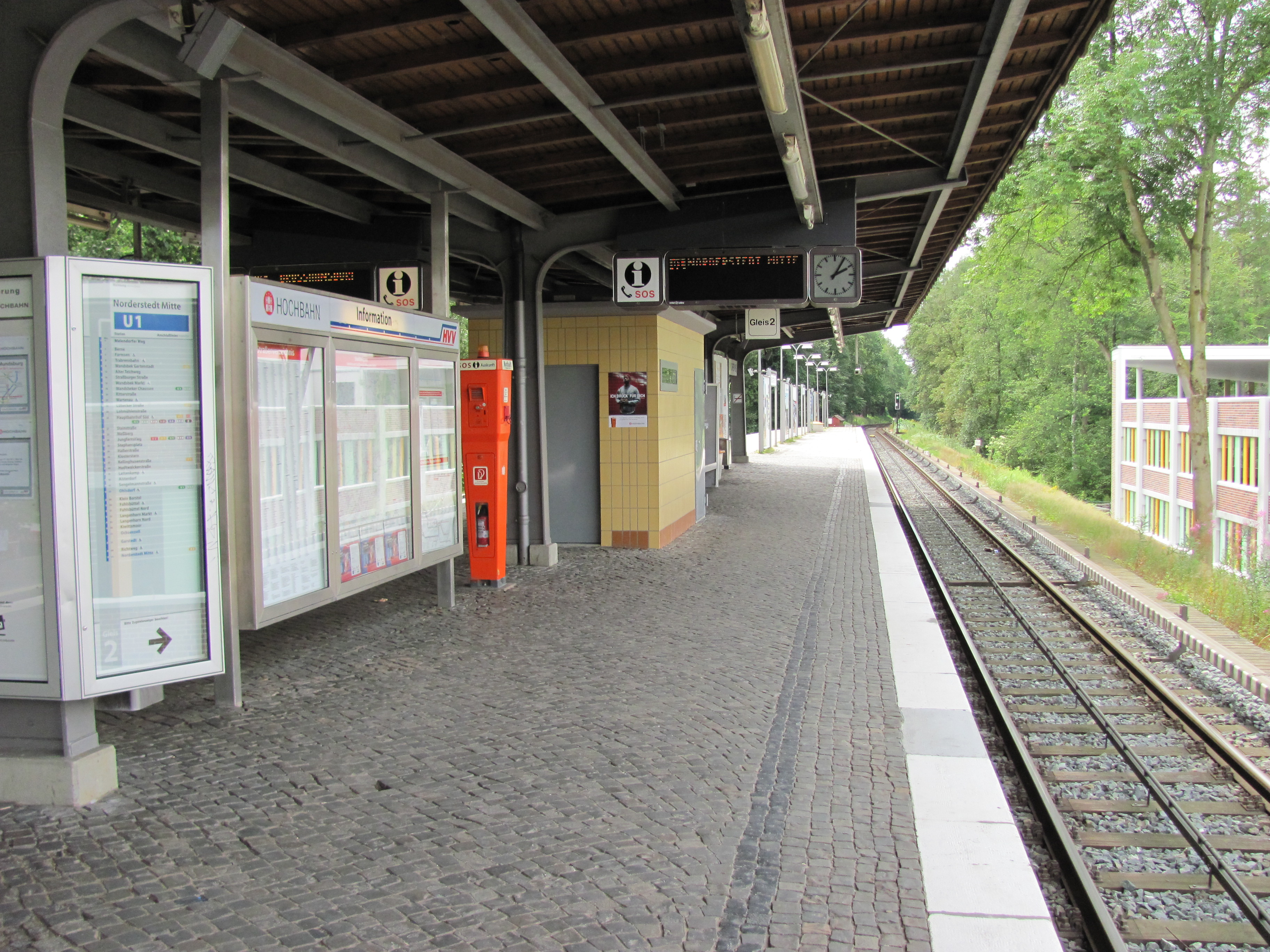

General information
- Location: Meiendorfer Weg; 22359 Hamburg, Germany
- Coordinates: 53.6392°N 10.1558°E
- System: Hamburg U-Bahn station
- Operator: Hamburger Hochbahn AG
- Line: U1
- Platforms: 1 island platforms
- Tracks: 2

Construction
- Structure type: Elevated
- Accessible: Yes

Other information
- Station code: HHA: ME
- Fare zone: HVV: B/304 and 305

History
- Opened: 1 April 1925; 101 years ago

Services
Preceding station	Hamburg U-Bahn	Following station
Berne towards Norderstedt Mitte	U1	Volksdorf towards Großhansdorf or Ohlstedt
Location

Meiendorfer Weg (Meiendorf Lane) is a rapid transit station located in the Hamburg quarter of Volksdorf, Germany. The station was opened in 1925 and is served by Hamburg U-Bahn line U1.

== History ==
The station was constructed under the name of Volksdorf-Süd (Volksdorf South) from 1912 to 1914, but only opened on 1 April 1925 on the Walddörfer railway line. During the first years of operation, the station was thought to be not needed because of the sparsely populated rural environment. When the station was opened for test purposes in 1925 though, it was surprisingly well frequented so it has remained open ever since.

Unlike other stations on the line, Meiendorfer Weg was originally constructed without an entrance building, but a small hall was added after World War II. The platform roof, which was originally made of concrete, was probably also added later on. In 1983, it was replaced by a steel roof.

Originally, near the station, a third track without a platform was located. Built for goods transports of Altrahlstedt-Wohldorfer Kleinbahn (local railway), it was later dismantled at Meiendorfer Weg station. Further south, near Berne station, it was re-built and used for brake tests and other U-Bahn test driving starting from Farmsen railway workshop.

A lift was added at Meiendorfer Weg in October 2018.

== Service ==
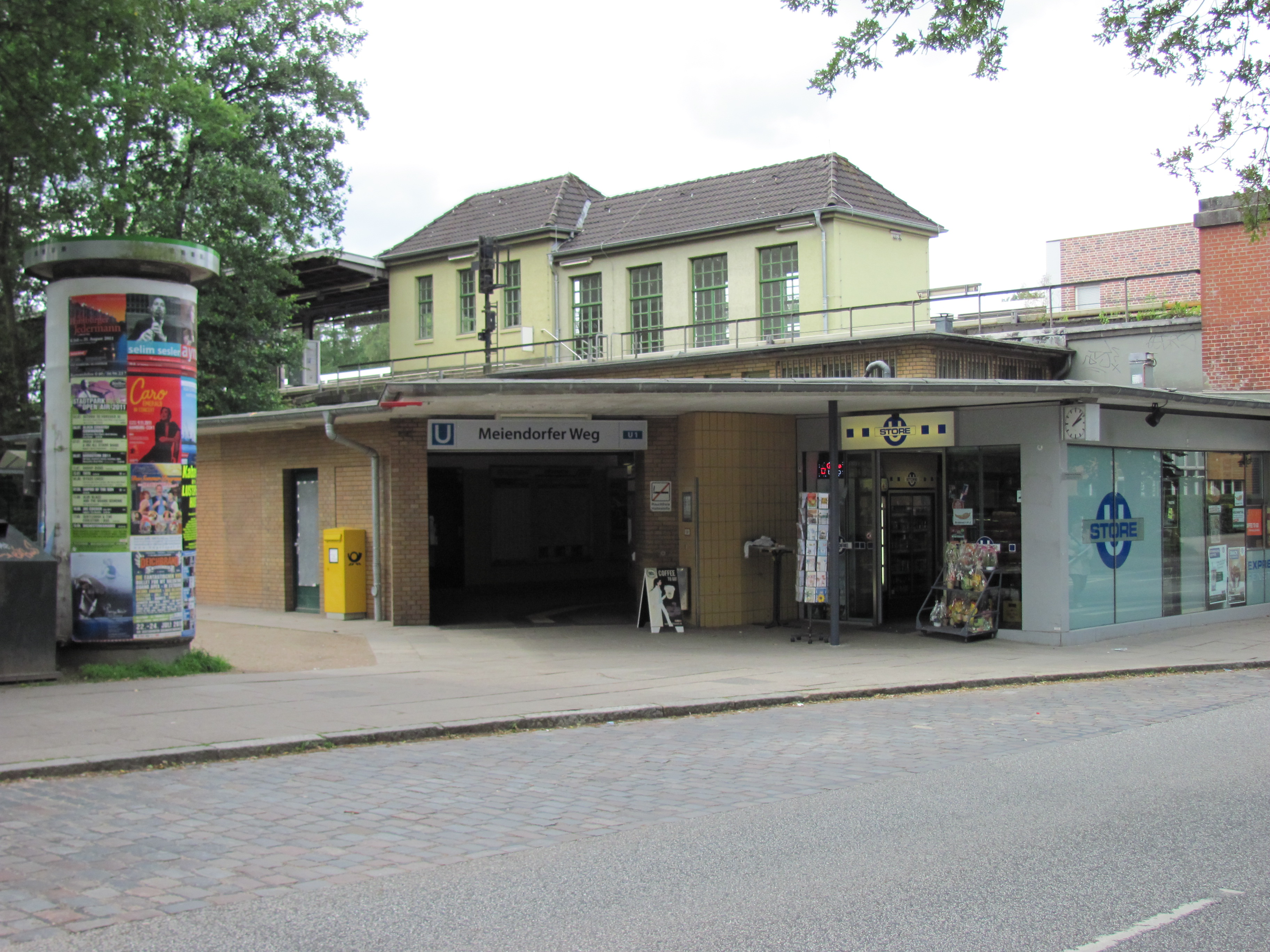
Entrance building

=== Trains ===
Meiendorfer Weg is served by Hamburg U-Bahn line U1. Departures are every 10 minutes; however, during certain peak times, trains run every 5 minutes. The travel time to Hamburg Hauptbahnhof is about 27 minutes.

== See also ==
- List of Hamburg U-Bahn stations
