= Buchenkamp station =

Railway station in Hamburg, Germany

Buchenkamp
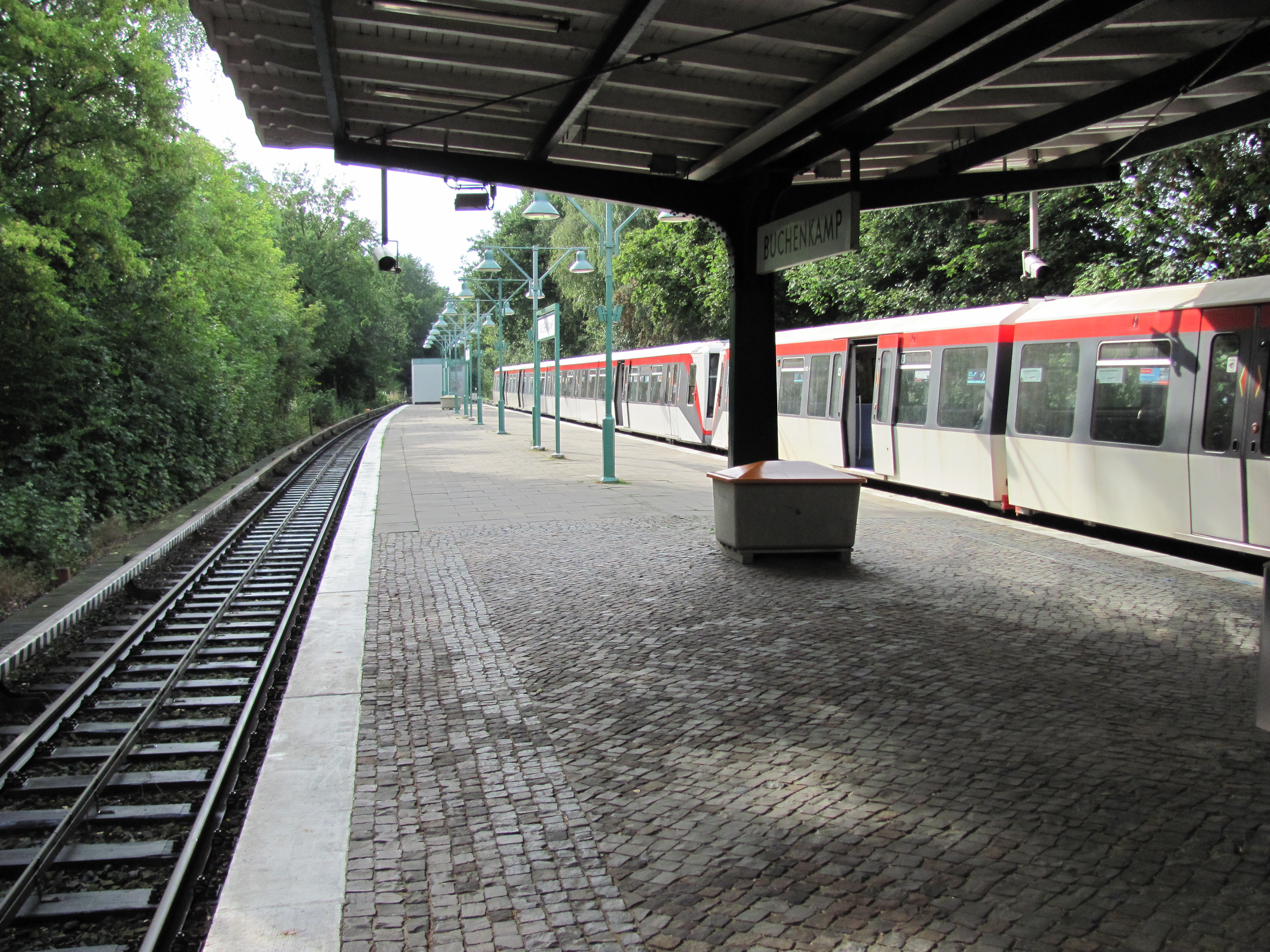
- The platform at Buchenkamp

General information
- Location: Buchenkamp; 22359 Hamburg, Germany; Germany
- Coordinates: 53.653°N 10.185°E
- System: Hamburg U-Bahn station
- Operator: Hamburger Hochbahn AG
- Line: U1
- Platforms: 1 island platform
- Tracks: 2
- Connections: Bus

Construction
- Structure type: Terrain cutting
- Accessible: Yes
- Architect: Eugen Göbel

Other information
- Station code: HHA: BP
- Fare zone: HVV: B/404 and 405

History
- Opened: 5 November 1921; 104 years ago

Services
| Preceding station | Hamburg U-Bahn | Following station |
|---|---|---|
| Volksdorf towards Norderstedt Mitte | U1 | Ahrensburg West towards Großhansdorf |
Location

Buchenkamp is a station in Volksdorf on the Großhansdorf branch of Hamburg U-Bahn line U1. It is the last station on the Großhansdorf branch that is within the city of Hamburg, as the Schleswig-Holstein state line is shortly after the east end of the platform.

== History ==
The station was built in 1914 based on schematics by Eugen Göbel, and opened in 1921, with only one track, as the second track was taken apart in order to obtain material to build a third rail for the electrification of the line. The second track was rebuilt in 1935.

== Services ==
Buchenkamp is served by Hamburg U-Bahn line U1.
