= Ahrensburg Ost station =

Railway station in Ahrensburg, Germany

Ahrensburg Ost
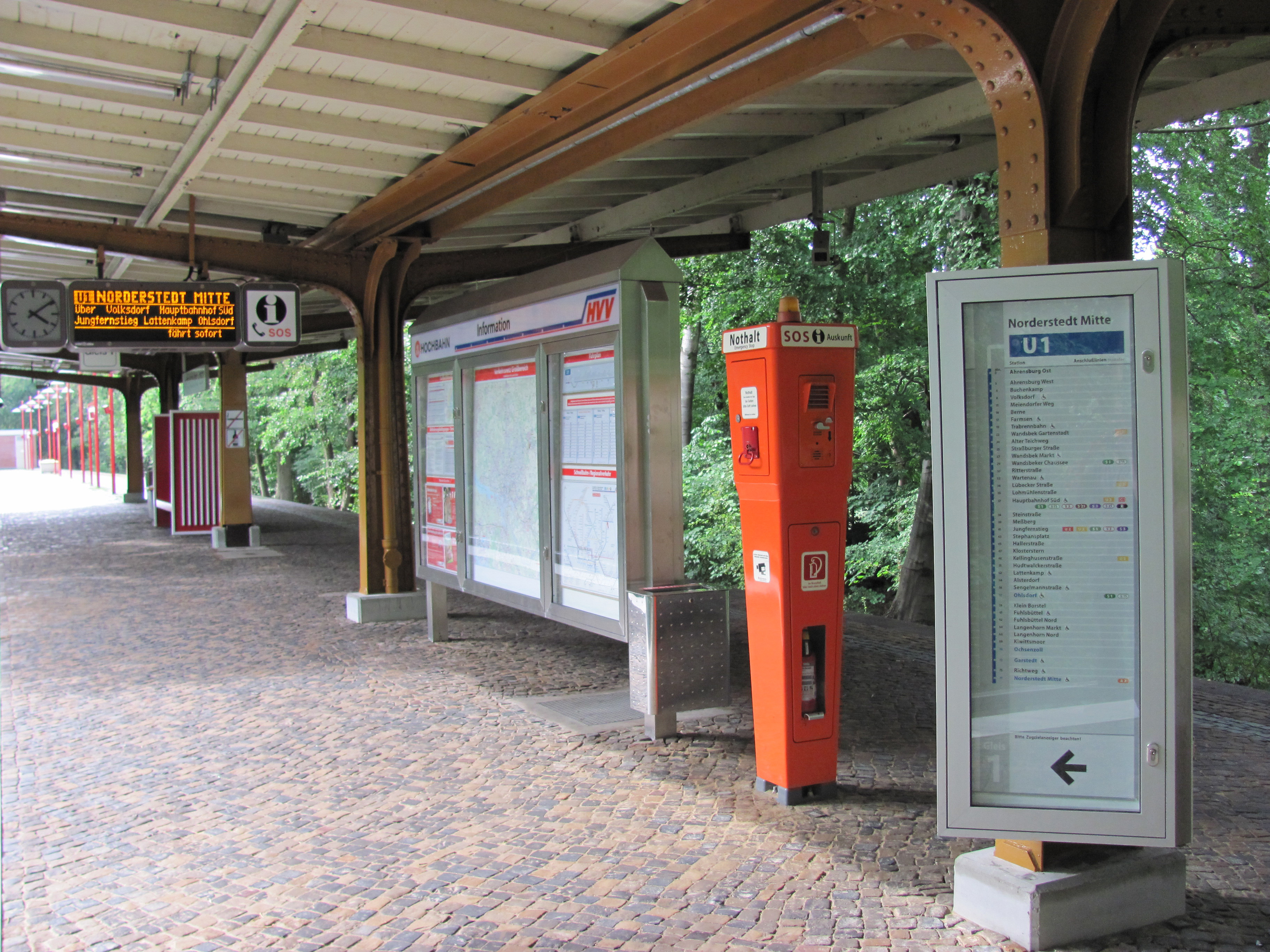
- The platform at Ahrensburg Ost

General information
- Location: Ahrensfelder Weg; 22926 Ahrensburg; Germany
- Coordinates: 53.6614°N 10.2420°E
- System: Hamburg U-Bahn station
- Operator: Hamburger Hochbahn AG
- Line: U1
- Platforms: 1 island platform
- Tracks: 1
- Connections: Bus

Construction
- Structure type: Terrain cutting
- Accessible: Yes
- Architect: Eugen Göbel

Other information
- Station code: HHA: AO
- Fare zone: HVV: B/505

History
- Opened: 17 June 1922; 104 years ago
- Former names: 1922–1952 Hopfenbach

Services
Preceding station	Hamburg U-Bahn	Following station
Ahrensburg West towards Norderstedt Mitte	U1	Schmalenbeck towards Großhansdorf
Location

Ahrensburg Ost is a station on the Großhansdorf branch of Hamburg U-Bahn line U1, located in the southeastern part of the town of Ahrensburg in Schleswig-Holstein, Germany.

== History ==
The station was built in 1914 using schematics from Eugen Göbel, but did not open with the rest of the stations on the Großhansdorf branch until a year later, in 1922 (under the name Hopfenbach) with only one track.

In 1952, the station's name was changed to its current name, Ahrensburg Ost.

The station has been altered very little, so that even today, it looks similar to the way it did at its opening.

== Services ==
Ahrensburg Ost is served by Hamburg U-Bahn line U1.
