= Schmalenbeck station =

Rapid transit station in Germany

Schmalenbeck
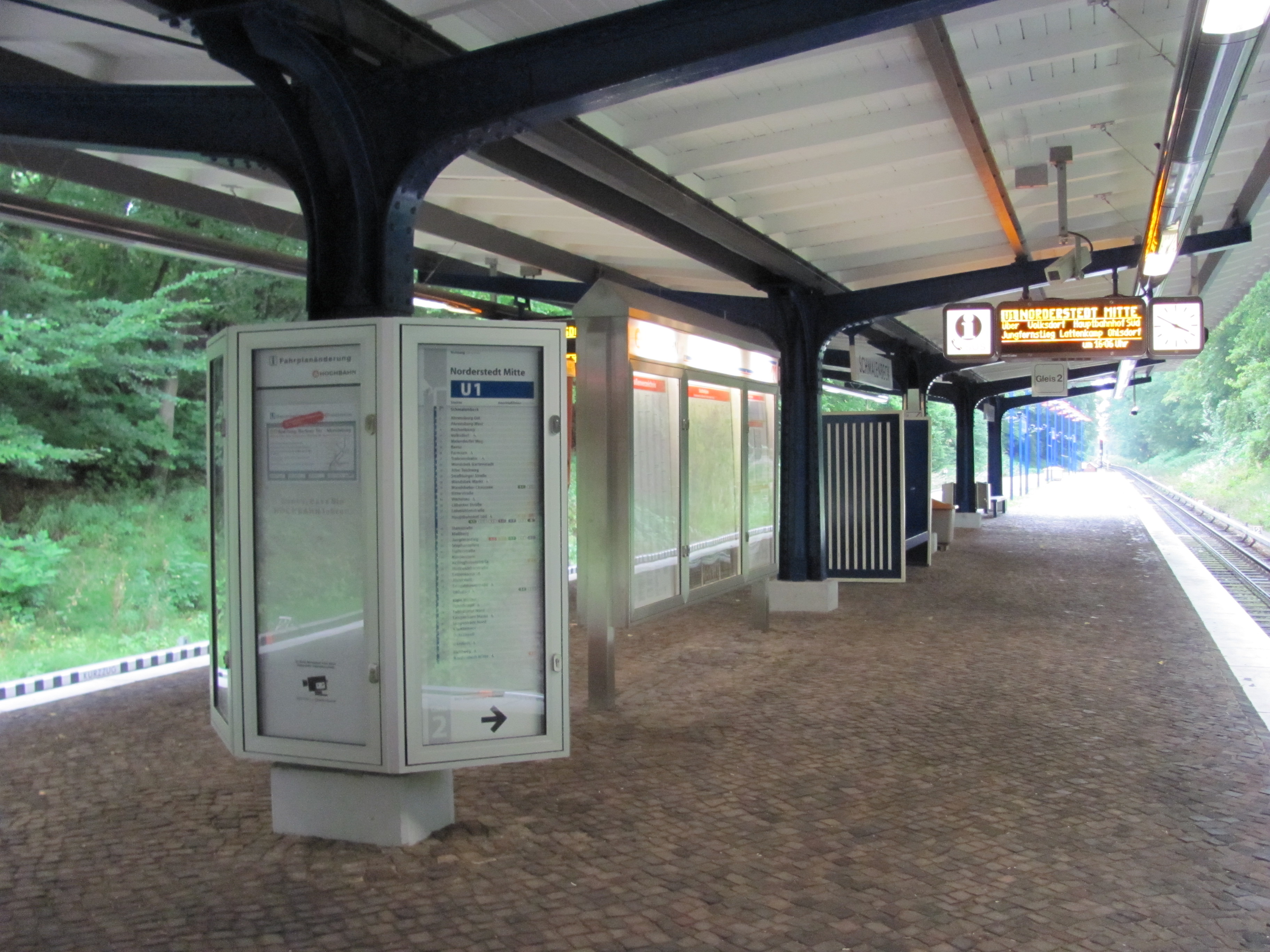
- The platform at Schmalenbeck

General information
- Location: Ahrensfelder Weg; 22927 Großhansdorf; Germany
- Coordinates: 53.6534°N 10.2602°E
- System: Hamburg U-Bahn station
- Operator: Hamburger Hochbahn AG
- Line: U1
- Platforms: 1 island platform
- Tracks: 2
- Connections: Bus

Construction
- Structure type: Terrain cutting
- Accessible: Yes

Other information
- Station code: HHA: SK
- Fare zone: HVV: B/505

History
- Opened: 5 November 1921

Services
Preceding station	Hamburg U-Bahn	Following station
Ahrensburg Ost towards Norderstedt Mitte	U1	Kiekut towards Großhansdorf
Location

Schmalenbeck is a station on the Großhansdorf branch of Hamburg U-Bahn line U1, located in the town of Großhansdorf, Schleswig-Holstein, Germany.

== History ==
The station was built following schematics by Eugen Göbel in 1914 and was opened in 1921. The second track at the station was added a year later, in 1922.

== Services ==
Schmalenbeck is served by Hamburg U-Bahn line U1.
