= Ahrensburg West station =

Railway station in Ahrensburg, Germany

Ahrensburg West
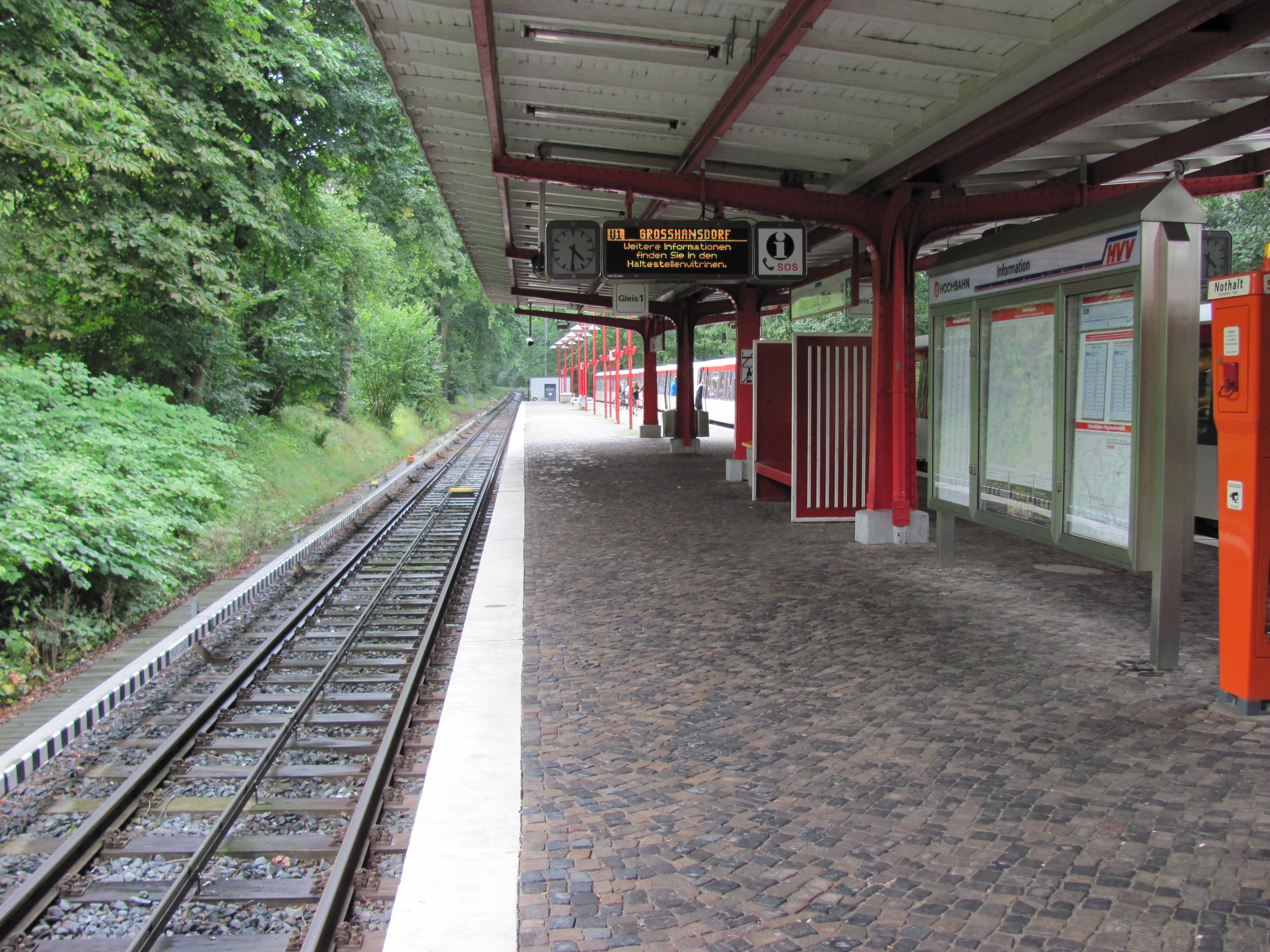
- The platform at Ahrensburg West

General information
- Location: Waldemar-Bonsels-Weg; 22926 Ahrensburg; Germany
- Coordinates: 53.6647°N 10.2191°E
- System: Hamburg U-Bahn station
- Operator: Hamburger Hochbahn AG
- Line: U1
- Platforms: 1 island platform
- Tracks: 2
- Connections: Bus

Construction
- Structure type: Terrain cutting
- Accessible: Yes
- Architect: Eugen Göbel

Other information
- Station code: HHA: AW
- Fare zone: HVV: B/404, 405, and 505

History
- Opened: 5 November 1921; 104 years ago
- Electrified: at opening
- Former names: 1921–1952 Ahrensburg

Services
Preceding station	Hamburg U-Bahn	Following station
Buchenkamp towards Norderstedt Mitte	U1	Ahrensburg Ost towards Großhansdorf
Location

Ahrensburg West is a station on the Großhansdorf branch of Hamburg U-Bahn line U1, located in the southwestern part of the town of Ahrensburg in Schleswig-Holstein.

== History ==
The station was built based on schematics by Eugen Göbel, and was opened on November 5, 1921, under the name "Ahrensburg" with only one track. The second track at the station was added in 1957.

When the next stop on the line, "Hopfenbach," was renamed to Ahrensburg Ost in 1952, "Ahrensburg" station was renamed to Ahrensburg West to avoid confusion between the two stations.

== Services ==
Ahrensburg West is served by Hamburg U-Bahn line U1.
