= List of Hamburg U-Bahn stations =

U-Bahn logo

The following list contains all 93 stations of the Hamburg U-Bahn. The Hamburg U-Bahn is operated by the Hamburger Hochbahn (HHA) under the supervision of the Hamburger Verkehrsverbund (HVV). The majority of stations are located within the borders of the city of Hamburg — only nine stations are in the German state of Schleswig-Holstein outside the city limits — and all stations are located on the right bank of the Elbe river.

== Stations ==
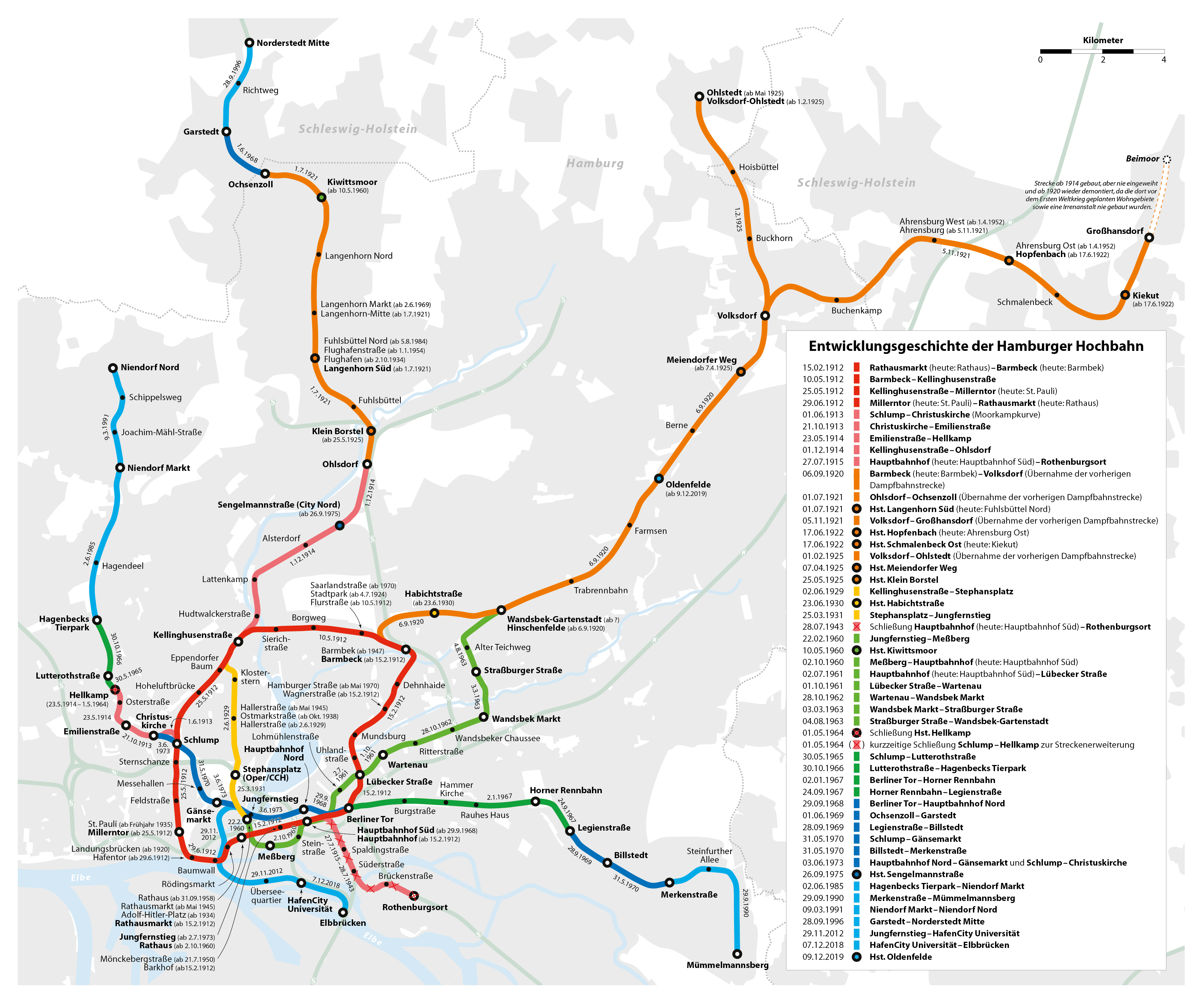
Development of the Hamburg U-Bahn network

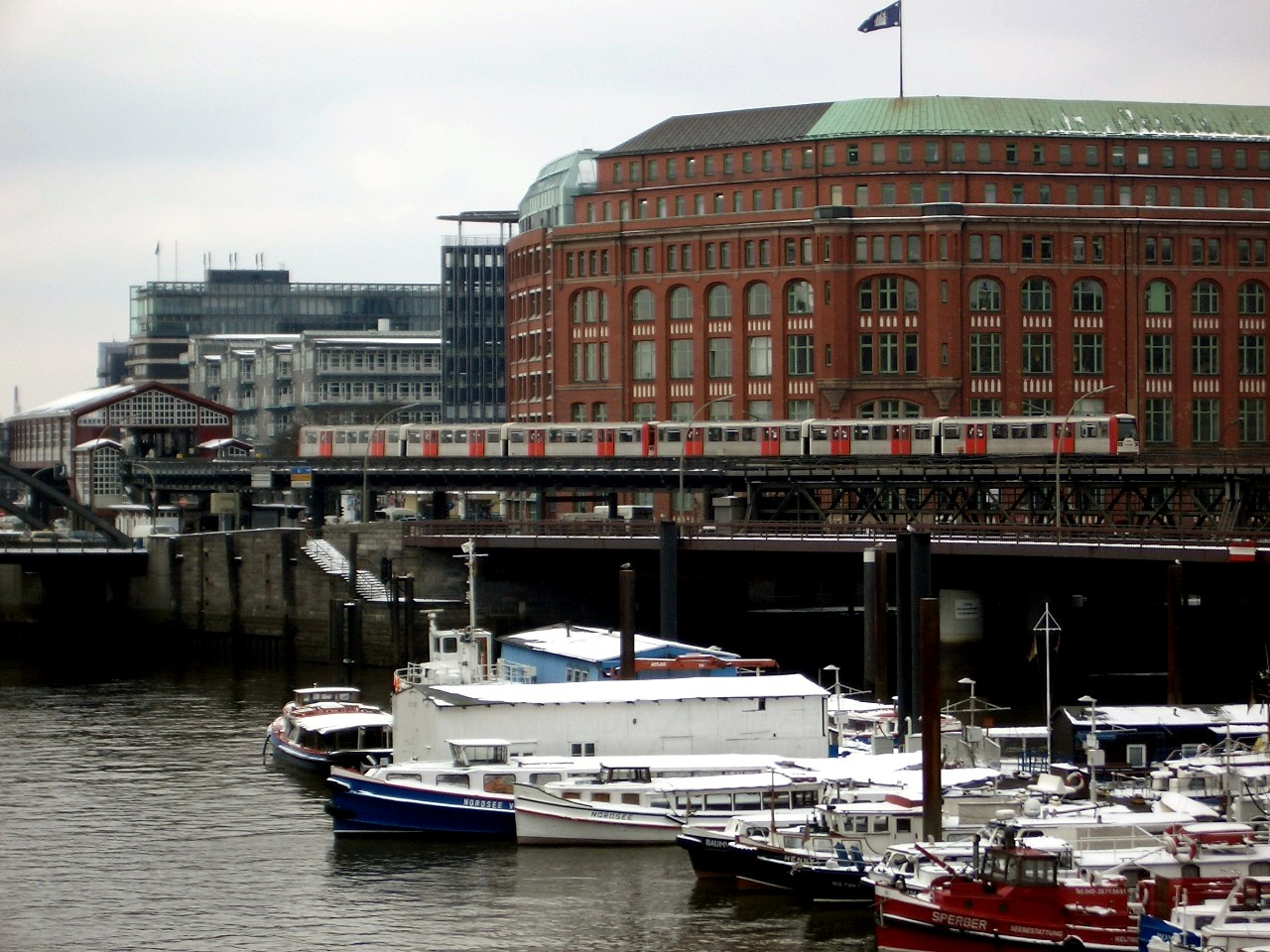
A train of line U3 near Baumwall station (on the left)

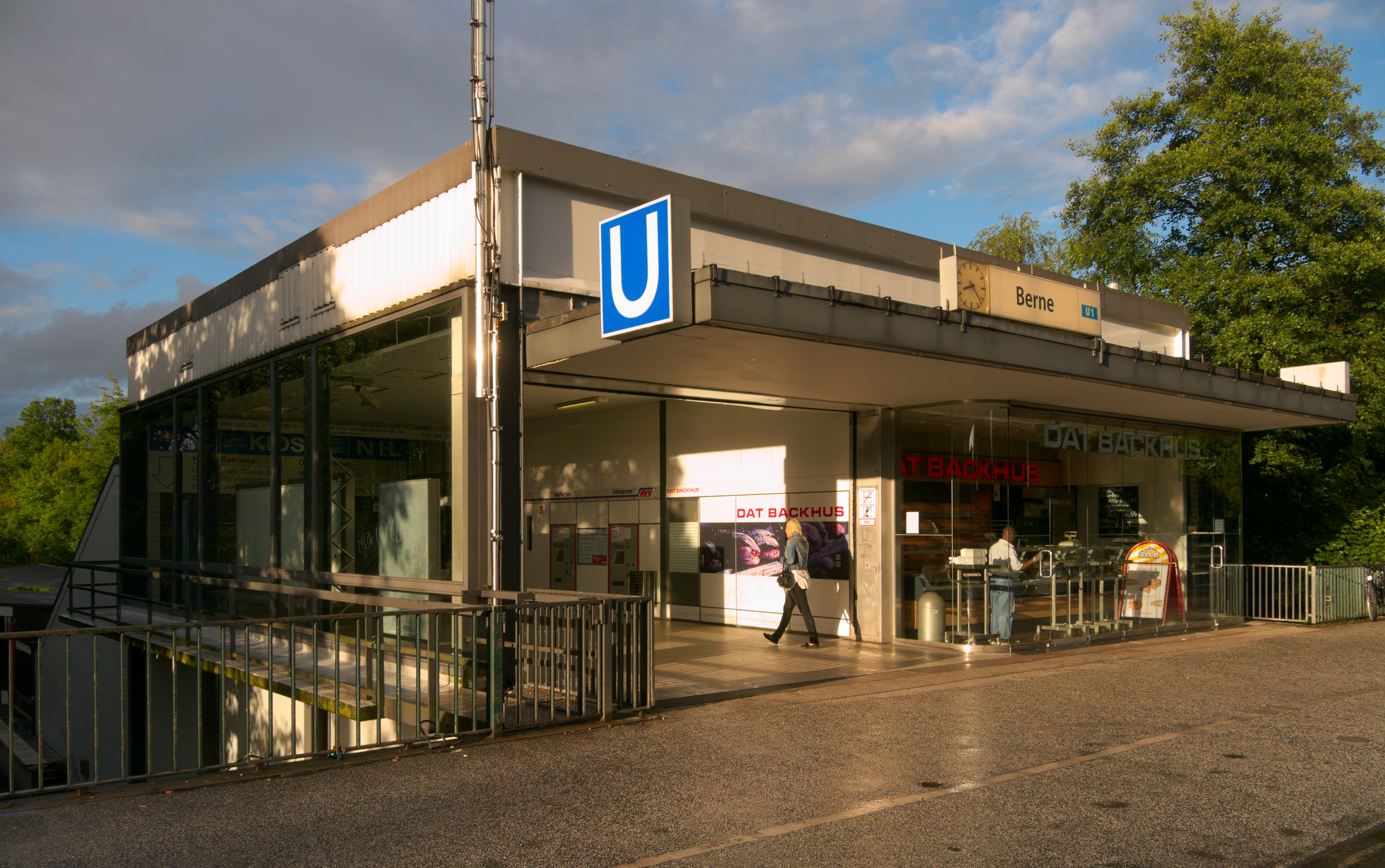
Berne station

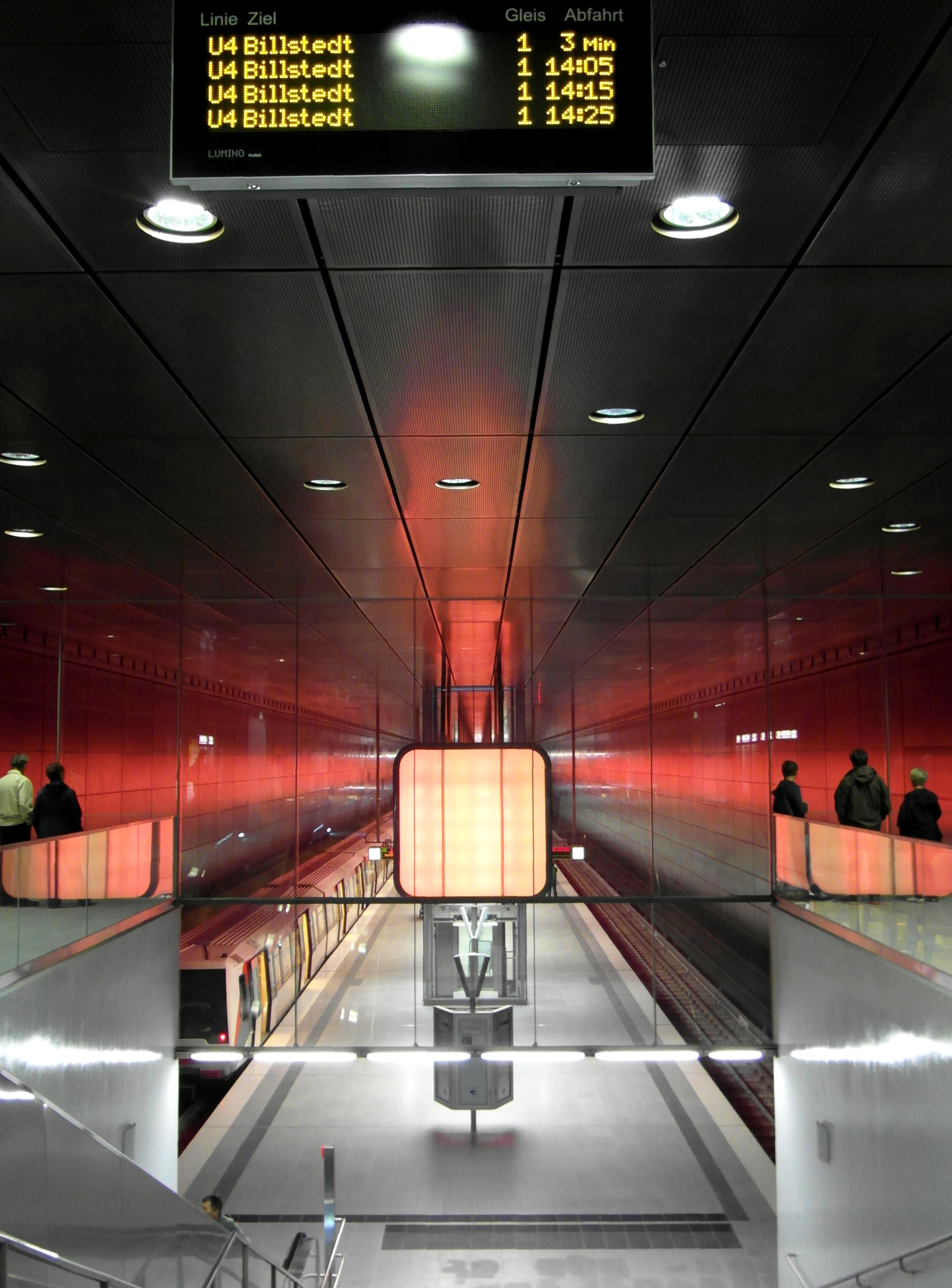
Mezzanine level at HafenCity Universität station

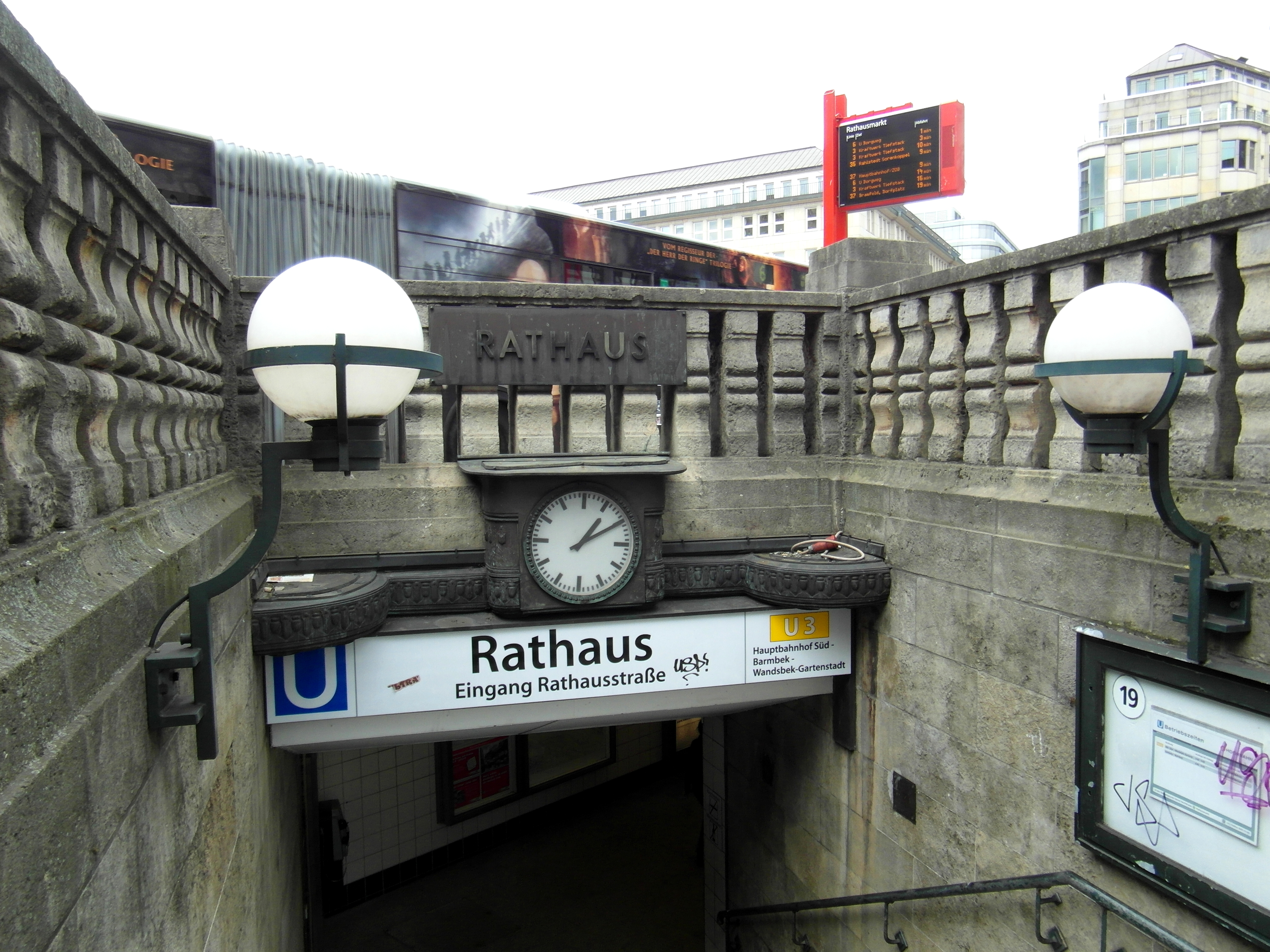
Entrance of Rathaus station

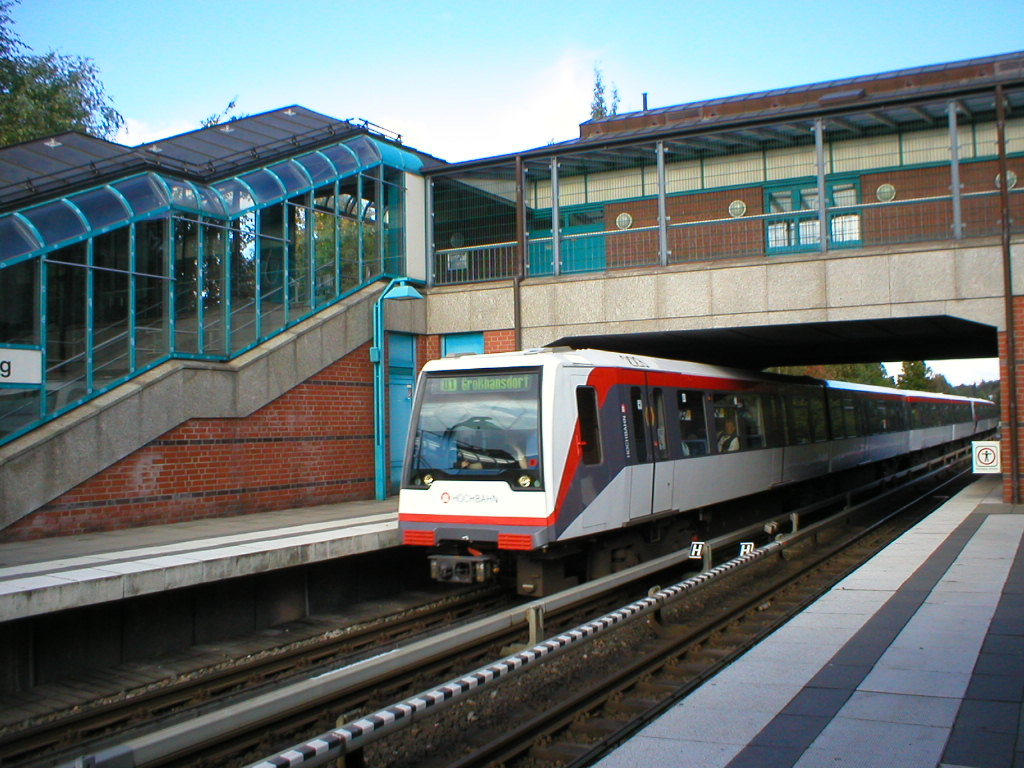
Platform of Richtweg station

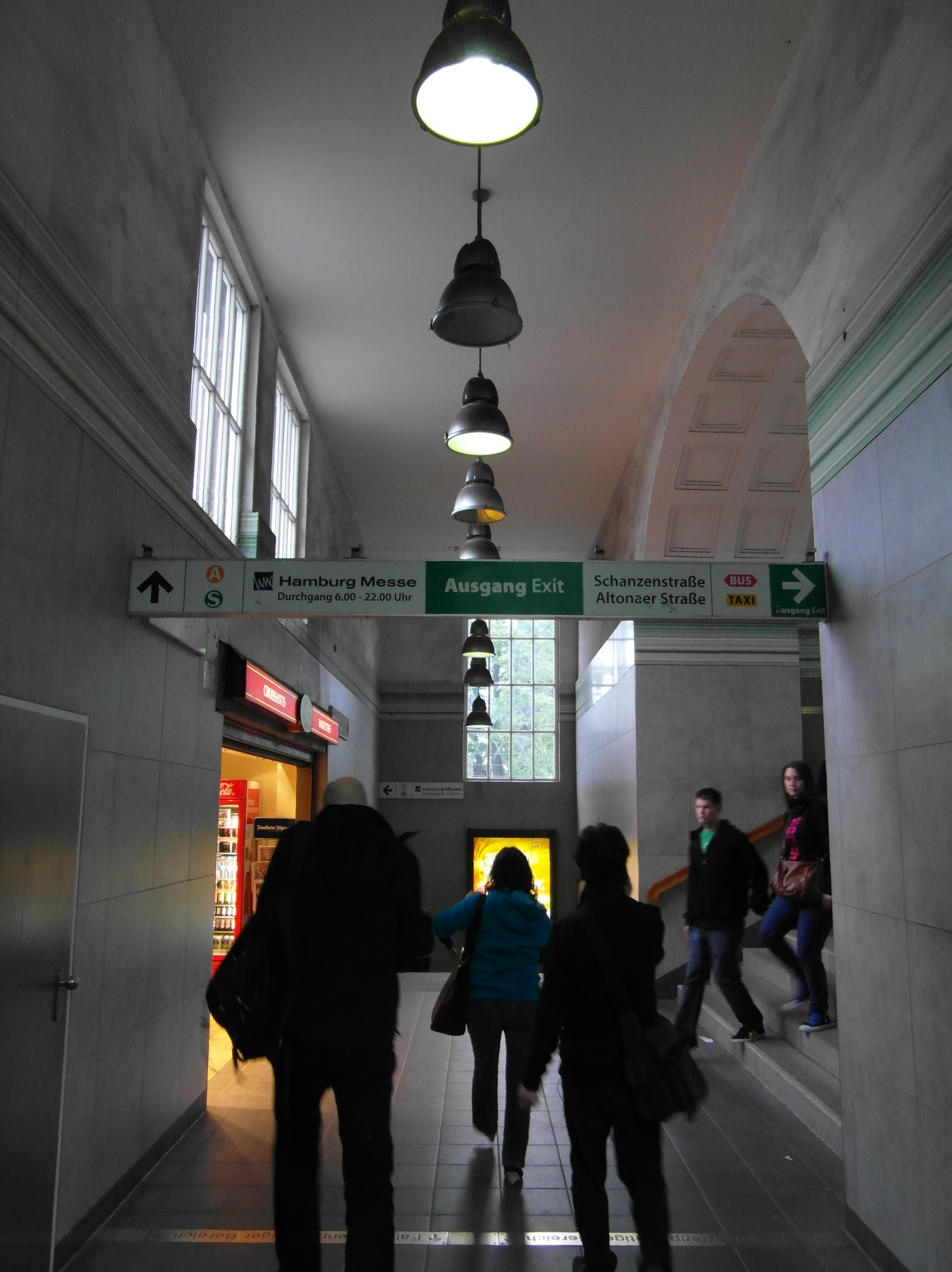
Entrance at Sternschanze station

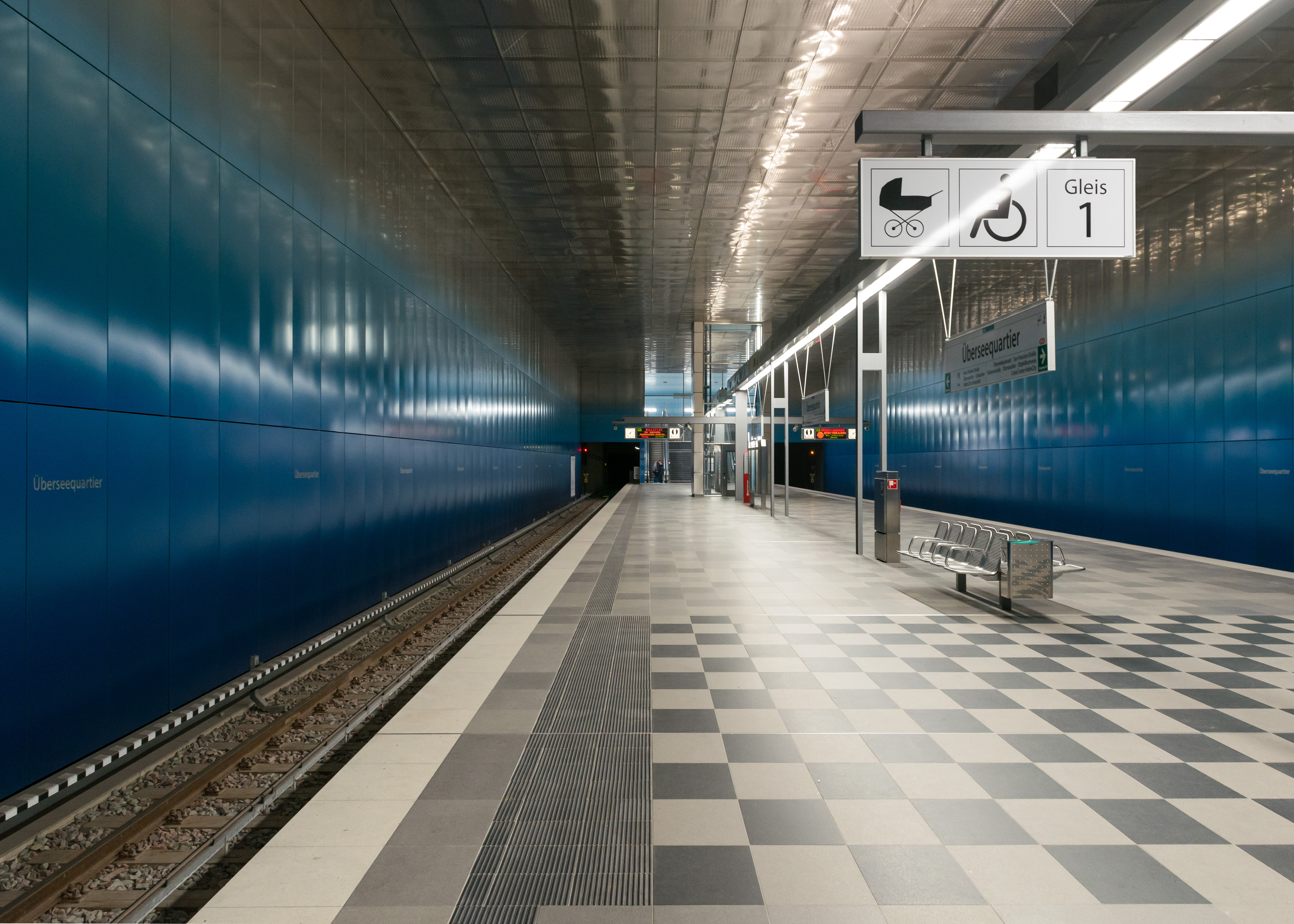
Platform at Überseequartier station

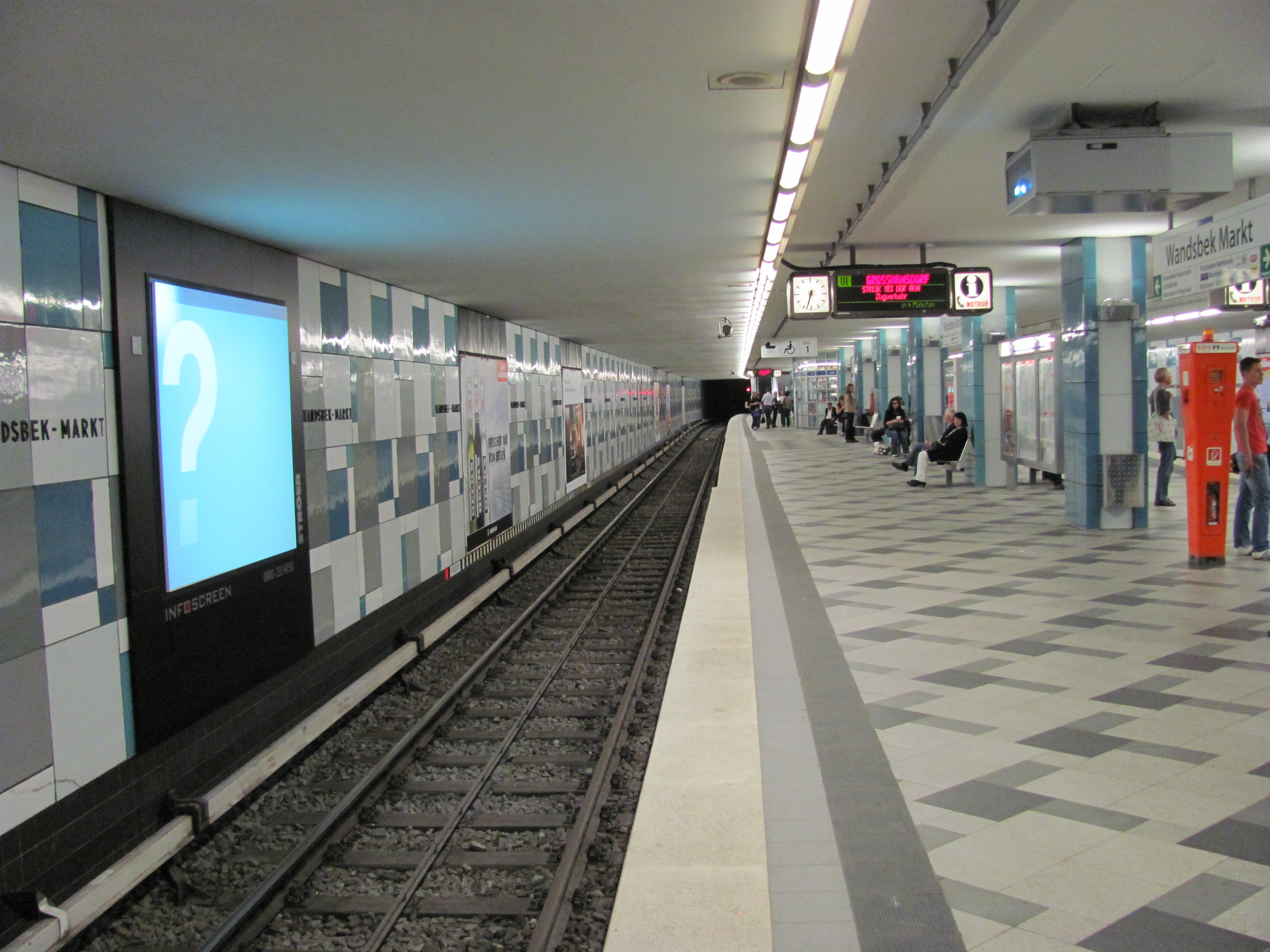
Platform of Wandsbek Markt station

This list gives the name of each station, the lines serving the station, the quarter and the fare zones,^{[A]} in which it is located, and the date or dates opened. All stations are located in the fare zone Greater Hamburg Area. Included are all stations currently open on the Hamburg U-Bahn.

Station	Line(s)^{[B]}	Location^{[C]}	Fare zone ring(s)	Fare zone(s)	Other connections^{[D]}	Date opened
Ahrensburg Ost	U1	Ahrensburg*	B	505		17 June 1922
Ahrensburg West	U1	Ahrensburg*	B	404, 405, 505		5 November 1921^{[E]}
Alsterdorf	U1		A	103, 105		1 December 1914
Alter Teichweg	U1		A	105, 205		2 August 1963
Barmbek	U3		A	000, 103, 105	S-Bahn S1	15 February 1912
Baumwall	U3		A	000, 101, 108		29 June 1912
Berliner Tor	U2, U3	St. Georg	A	000, 105, 106	S-Bahn S1, S2	15 February 1912
Berne	U1		B	304, 305		6 September 1920
Billstedt	U2	Billstedt	A	206		28 September 1969
Borgweg	U3	Winterhude	A	103, 105		10 May 1912
Buchenkamp	U1		B	404, 405		5 November 1921
Buckhorn	U1		B	404		1 February 1925
Burgstraße	U2		A	105, 106		2 January 1967
Christuskirche	U2	Eimsbüttel	A	101, 103		21 June 1913
Dehnhaide	U3	Barmbek-Süd	A	000, 105		15 February 1912
Emilienstraße	U2	Eimsbüttel	A	101, 103		21 October 1913
Elbbrücken	U4	HafenCity	A	000		7 December 2018
Eppendorfer Baum	U3		A	000, 103		25 May 1912
Farmsen	U1		A, B	204, 205, 304, 305		6 September 1920
Feldstraße	U3		A	000, 101		25 May 1912
Fuhlsbüttel	U1	Fuhlsbüttel	A	203		1 July 1921
Fuhlsbüttel Nord	U1	Fuhlsbüttel, Langenhorn	A	203		1 July 1921^{[F]}
Garstedt	U1	Norderstedt*	B	403		29 May 1969
Großhansdorf	U1	Großhansdorf*	B	505		5 November 1921
Gänsemarkt	U2		A	000		31 May 1970
Habichtstraße	U3		A	105		23 June 1930
HafenCity Universität	U4	HafenCity	A	000		9 December 2012
Hagenbecks Tierpark	U2		A	101, 103, 201, 203		30 October 1966
Hagendeel	U2		A	201, 203		1 June 1985
Hallerstraße	U1	Harvesterhude, Rotherbaum	A	000		2 June 1929
Hamburger Straße	U3		A	105		15 February 1912
Hammer Kirche	U2		A	105, 106		2 January 1967
Hauptbahnhof Nord	U2	Altstadt, St. Georg	A	000	Long distance trains, regional trains, all S-Bahn lines	29 September 1968
Hauptbahnhof Süd	U1, U3	Altstadt, St. Georg	A	000	Long distance trains, regional trains, all S-Bahn lines	15 February 1912
Hoheluftbrücke	U3		A	000, 101, 103		25 May 1912
Hoisbüttel	U1	Ammersbek*	B	404		1 February 1925
Horner Rennbahn	U3	Horn	A	105, 106, 205, 206		2 January 1967
Hudtwalckerstraße	U1	Winterhude	A	103, 105		1 December 1914
Joachim-Mähl-Straße	U2	Niendorf	A	201, 203		9 March 1991
Jungfernstieg	U1, U2		A	000	S-Bahn S1, S3	25 March 1931
Kellinghusenstraße	U1, U3		A	000, 103, 105		10 May 1912
Kiekut	U1	Großhansdorf*	B	505		17 June 1922
Kiwittsmoor	U1	Langenhorn	B	303		10 May 1960
Klein Borstel	U1		A	203		25 May 1925
Klosterstern	U1		A	000		2 June 1929
Landungsbrücken	U3	Neustadt, St. Pauli	A	000, 101	S-Bahn S1, S3	29 June 1912^{[G]}
Langenhorn Markt	U1	Langenhorn	A, B	303, 203		1 July 1921
Langenhorn Nord	U1	Langenhorn	B	303		1 July 1921
Lattenkamp	U1	Winterhude	A	103, 105		1 December 1914
Legienstraße	U2	Horn	A	206		24 September 1967
Lohmühlenstraße	U1	St. Georg	A	000		2 July 1961
Lutterothstraße	U2	Eimsbüttel	A	101, 103		30 May 1965
Lübecker Straße	U1, U3		A	000, 105		15 February 1912
Meiendorfer Weg	U1		B	304, 305		1 April 1925
Merkenstraße	U2	Billstedt	A	206		31 May 1970
Messehallen	U2		A	000		31 May 1970
Meßberg	U1		A	000		22 February 1960
Mundsburg	U3		A	000, 105		15 February 1912
Mönckebergstraße	U3		A	000		15 February 1912
Mümmelmannsberg	U2	Billstedt	A	306		29 September 1990
Niendorf Markt	U2	Niendorf	A	201, 203		1 June 1985
Niendorf Nord	U2	Niendorf	A, B	201, 203, 303		9 March 1991
Norderstedt Mitte	U1	Norderstedt*	B	503, 403	AKN A2	28 September 1996
Ochsenzoll	U1	Langenhorn	B	403, 303		1 July 1921
Ohlsdorf	U1		A	103, 105, 203	S-Bahn S1	1 December 1914
Ohlstedt	U1		B	404, 504		1 February 1925
Oldenfelde	U1		B	304, 305		9 December 2019
Osterstraße	U2	Eimsbüttel	A	101, 103		23 May 1914
Rathaus	U3		A	000		15 February 1912
Rauhes Haus	U2		A	105, 106		2 January 1967
Richtweg	U1	Norderstedt*	B	403		28 September 1996
Ritterstraße	U1	Eilbek	A	105		28 October 1962
Rödingsmarkt	U3		A	000		29 June 1912
Saarlandstraße	U3		A	103, 105		10 May 1912
Schippelsweg	U2	Niendorf	A	201, 203		9 March 1991
Schlump	U2, U3		A	000, 101, 103		25 May 1912
Schmalenbeck	U1	Großhansdorf*	B	505		5 November 1921
Sengelmannstraße	U1	Alsterdorf, Winterhude	A	103, 105		26 September 1975
Sierichstraße	U3	Winterhude	A	000, 103, 105		10 May 1912
St. Pauli	U3	Neustadt, St. Pauli	A	000, 101		25 May 1912
Steinfurther	U2	Billstedt	A	206, 306		29 September 1990
Steinstraße	U1		A	000		2 October 1960
Stephansplatz	U1		A	000		2 June 1929
Sternschanze	U3		A	000, 101	S-Bahn S2, S5	25 May 1912
Straßburger	U1		A	105, 205		3 March 1963
Trabrennbahn	U1		A	204, 205		30 March 1924
Überseequartier	U4	HafenCity	A	000		9 December 2012
Uhlandstraße	U3		A	000, 105		15 February 1912
Volksdorf	U1		B	304, 305, 404, 405		6 September 1920
Wandsbek Gartenstadt	U1, U3	Wandsbek	A	105, 204, 205		6 September 1920
Wandsbek Markt	U1	Wandsbek	A	105, 205		28 October 1962
Wandsbeker Chaussee	U1	Eilbek, Wandsbek	A	105	S-Bahn S1	28 October 1962
Wartenau	U1	Eilbek, Hohenfelde	A	105		1 October 1961

== See also ==
- List of railway stations in Hamburg
- List of Hamburg S-Bahn stations

== Notes ==
A. The Hamburger Verkehrsverbund uses a system of concentric zones for the calculation of fares between stations. Fares between any station in one zone and any station in another are the same, irrespective of the start and end points of the journey or the route used.

All stations are located in the fare zone Greater Hamburg Area.

B. Where more than one line serves a station, lines are listed in numerical order.
C. The asterisk indicates a locality in the German state of Schleswig-Holstein.

Where a station is located on the border between two localities, these are listed alphabetically.

D. Connections to the Hamburg S-Bahn and other railways.
E. Former name: 1921–1952: Ahrensburg
F. Former names: 1921–1934: Langenhorn Süd, 1934–1954: Flughafen, 1954–1983: Flughafenstraße
G. Former name: 1912–192x: Hafentor
