= Kiekut station =

Railway station in Großhansdorf, Germany

Kiekut
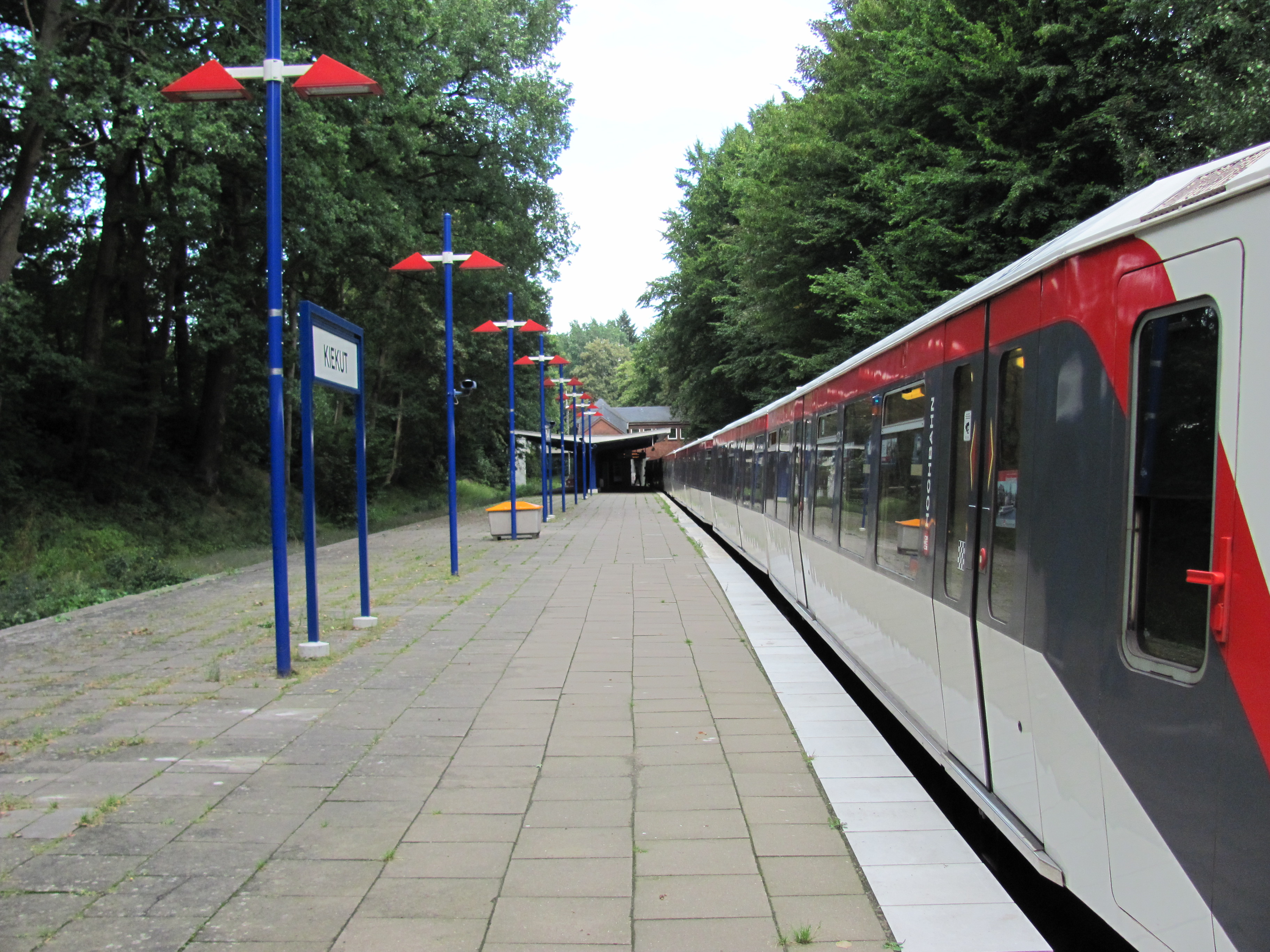
- The platform at Kiekut

General information
- Location: Bei den Rauhen Bergen; 22927 Großhansdorf, Germany; Germany
- Coordinates: 53.6528°N 10.2800°E
- System: Hamburg U-Bahn station
- Operator: Hamburger Hochbahn AG
- Line: U1
- Platforms: 1 island platform
- Tracks: 1
- Connections: Bus

Construction
- Structure type: Terrain cutting
- Accessible: No

Other information
- Station code: HHA: KI
- Fare zone: HVV: B/505

History
- Opened: 17 June 1922
- Former names: 1921-1922 Schmalenbeck Ost

Services
Preceding station	Hamburg U-Bahn	Following station
Schmalenbeck towards Norderstedt Mitte	U1	Großhansdorf Terminus
Location

Kiekut is a station on the Großhansdorf branch of Hamburg U-Bahn line U1. The station was opened in June 1922, and is located in the Hamburg suburb of Großhansdorf, Germany.

== History ==
The railway station was built according to a design by Eugen Göbel around 1915. When the station was built, the area around it was very sparsely populated, so only the most necessary parts were built, such as the platform, stairway, and bridge to the street. No station building was built. When the tracks at the station were electrified, the westbound track was taken out and since hasn't been replaced. The track was electrified in 1921, but trains did not stop here until 1922.

In 1954 and 1994, the entrance to the station was redesigned.

== Services ==
Kiekut is served by Hamburg U-Bahn line U1.
