= Hoisbüttel station =

Rapid transit station in Germany

Hoisbüttel
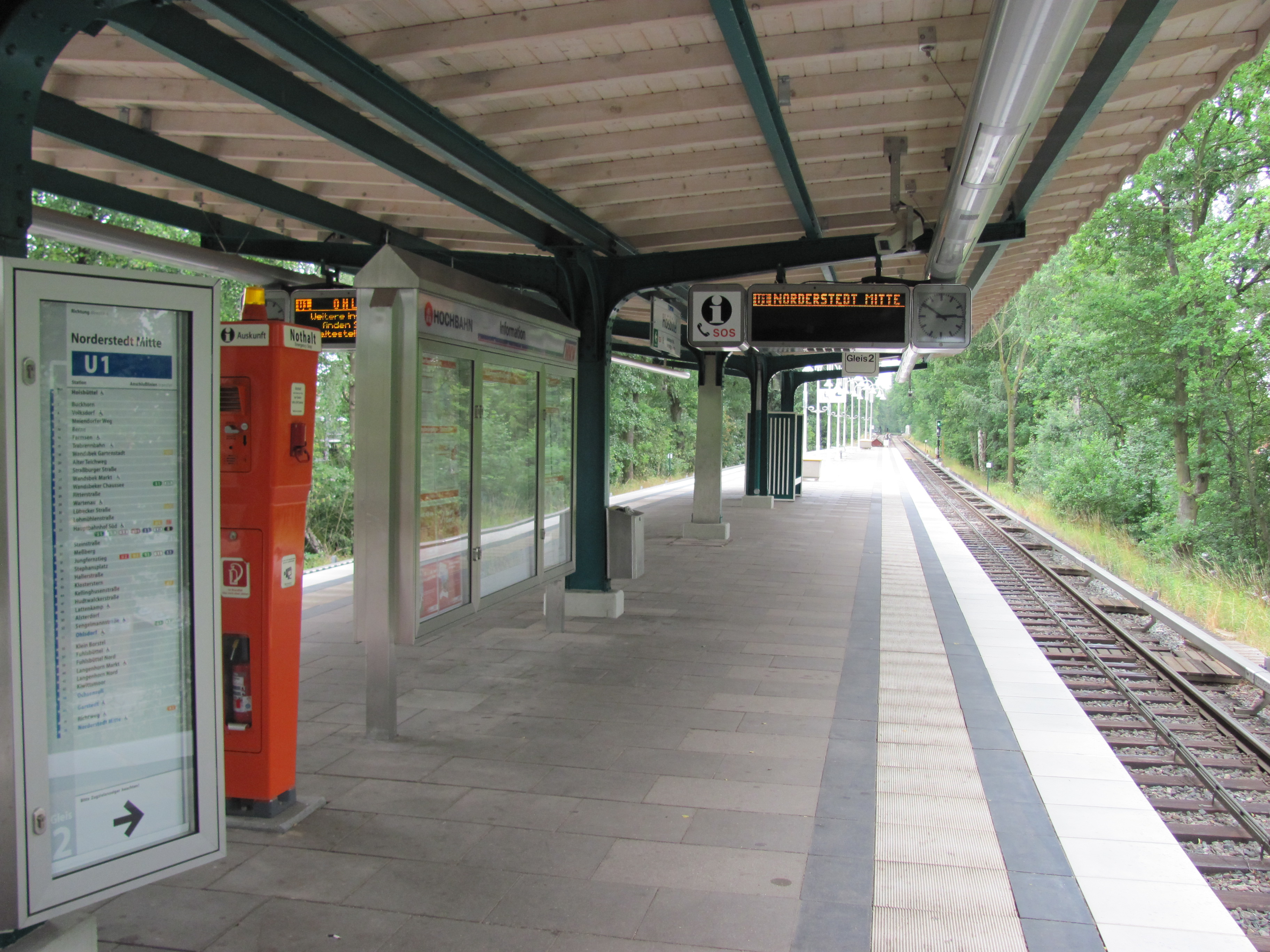
- The platform at Hoisbüttel

General information
- Location: Hamburger Straße; 22949 Ammersbek; Germany
- Coordinates: 53°40′41″N 10°08′51″E
- System: Hamburg U-Bahn station
- Operator: Hamburger Hochbahn AG
- Line: U1
- Platforms: 1 island platform
- Tracks: 2
- Connections: Bus

Construction
- Structure type: Elevated
- Accessible: Yes

Other information
- Station code: HHA: HT
- Fare zone: HVV: B/404

History
- Opened: 1 February 1925
- Electrified: February 1925

Services
Preceding station	Hamburg U-Bahn	Following station
Buckhorn towards Norderstedt Mitte	U1	Ohlstedt Terminus
Location

Hoisbüttel is a station on the Ohlstedt branch of the Hamburg U-Bahn line U1. The station is located in Ammersbek in Schleswig-Holstein, Germany.

== History ==
The station was constructed from 1912 to 1914 using plans by Eugen Göbel, but there were no trains at the station until September 1918. The station opened with the start of provisional steam train operation to Barmbek. This provisional steam train operation was ended in the middle of 1919. In 1924, one of the tracks was dismantled and electric operation on the line started in early February 1925. In 1927, a second track was installed, which initially started just before the station and led to the terminus, Ohlstedt.

It was only in 1954 that the second track was extended to Volksdorf, fully double-tracking the entire Ohlstedt branch.

In 1989, the whole station was renovated, adding an elevator and a second exit.

== Services ==
Hoisbüttel is served by Hamburg U-Bahn line U1.
