= Buckhorn station =

Railway station in Volksdorf, Germany

Buckhorn
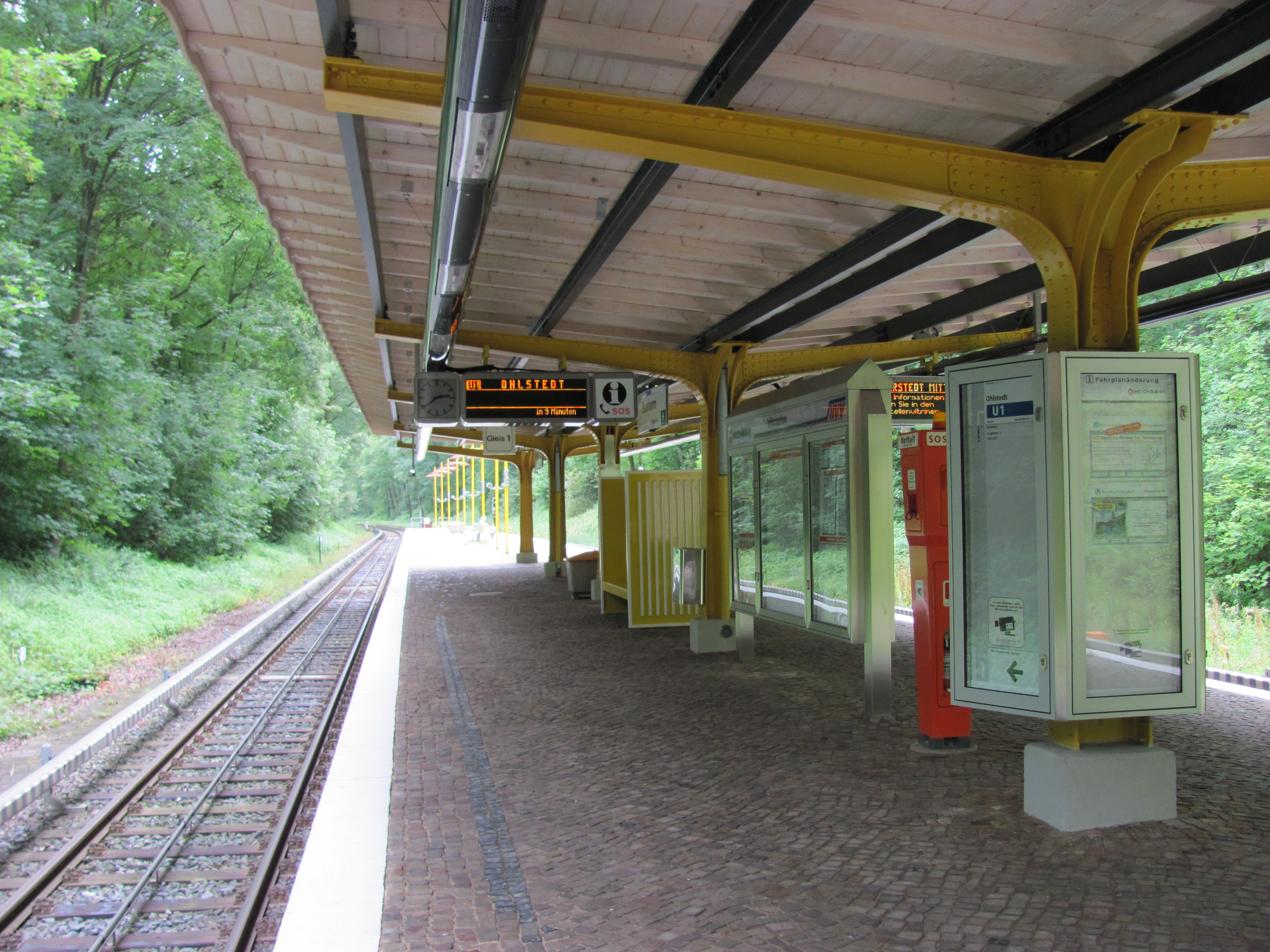
- The platform at Buckhorn

General information
- Location: Im Regestall; 22419 Hamburg, Germany; Germany
- Coordinates: 53°39′51″N 10°09′21″E
- System: Hamburg U-Bahn station
- Operator: Hamburger Hochbahn AG
- Line: U1
- Platforms: 1 island platform
- Tracks: 2
- Connections: Bus

Construction
- Structure type: At grade
- Accessible: Yes
- Architect: Eugen Göbel

Other information
- Station code: HHA: BN
- Fare zone: HVV: B/404

History
- Opened: 1 February 1925; 101 years ago
- Electrified: 1925
- Former names: 1916-1925 Volksdorf Nord

Services
Preceding station	Hamburg U-Bahn	Following station
Volksdorf towards Norderstedt Mitte	U1	Hoisbüttel towards Ohlstedt
Location

Buckhorn is a station in Volksdorf on the Hamburg U-Bahn line U1. It is located on the Ohlstedt branch of the line.

== History ==
The station was built in 1916 under the name "Volksdorf-Nord." The station's architect was Eugen Göbel, who also designed the U-Bahn and S-Bahn stations Barmbek, Hasselbrook, and Ohlsdorf, as well as all underground stations of the Walddörferbahn.

Because of the provisional steam railway operation to Barmbek, initially, no trains stopped at the station. It was only with the beginning of electrical railway operations in 1925 that trains stopped at this station, which now had the name Buckhorn.

== Services ==
Buckhorn is served by Hamburg U-Bahn line U1.
