= Axel Jonas Halbach =

German economist, writer and painter

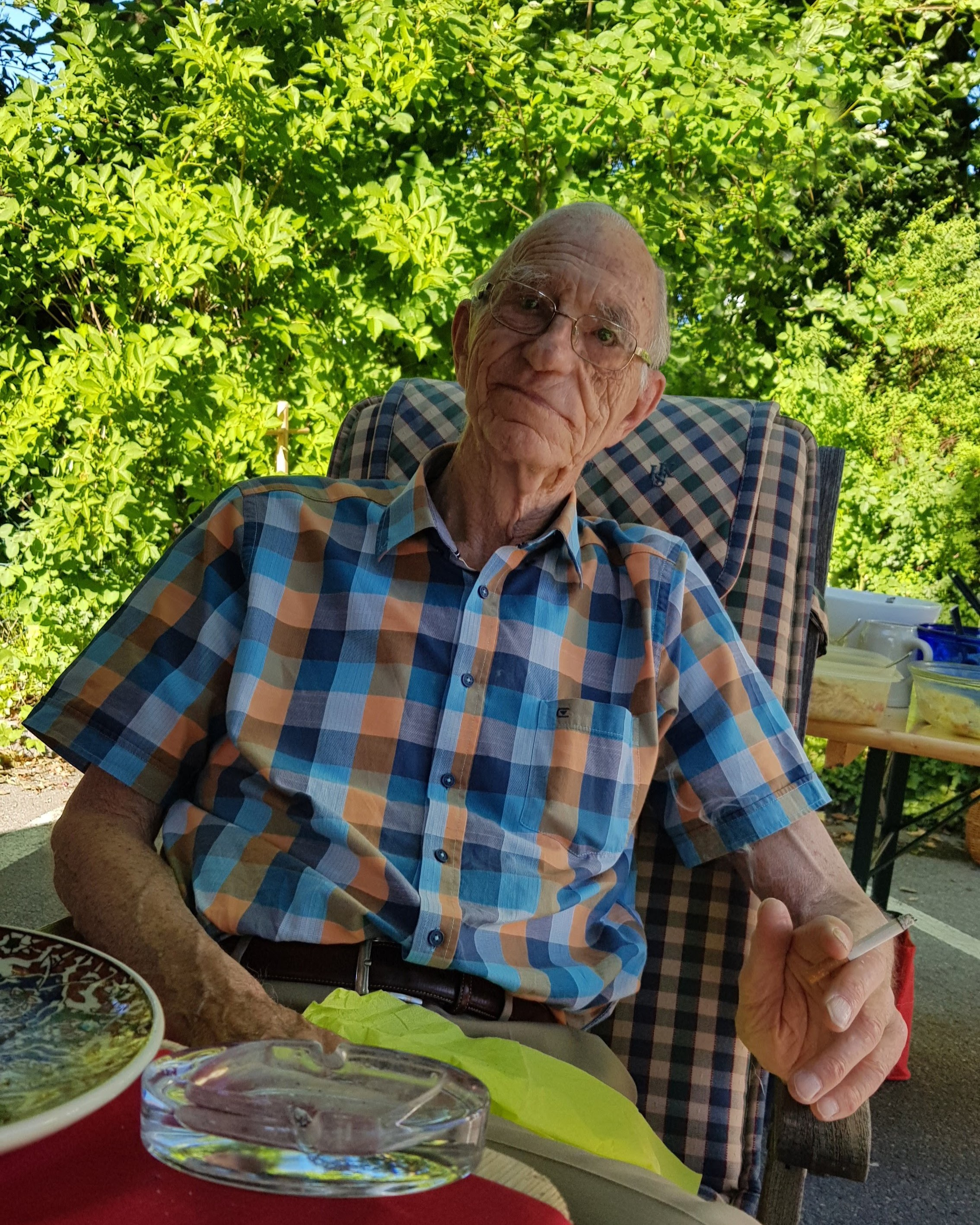
- Halbach in 2017
- Born: March 18, 1934; Hamburg, Germany
- Died: December 12, 2022 (aged 88); Ismaning, Germany
- Occupations: Economist; development expert; writer; poet; painter
- Employer: Ifo Institute for Economic Research (Munich)
- Known for: Development policy research; Afrika-Studien series; Karl May–inspired novels

Axel Jonas Halbach (18 March 1934 – 12 December 2022) was a German economist, development cooperation expert, writer, poet, and painter. He worked for the Ifo Institute for Economic Research in Munich for more than three decades, contributing to development policy and publishing widely in the Afrika-Studien series. In addition to his academic career, Halbach wrote Karl May–inspired adventure novels, composed poetry, and exhibited his paintings in Germany.

== Early life and education ==
Halbach was born in Hamburg and pursued secondary education at the Gymnasium Hamburg-Volksdorf, where his artistic talents were nurtured. After completing training in business administration, he joined the Ifo Institute, focusing on developing-country economics.

== Career in economics and development ==
From the 1960s, Halbach was associated with the Ifo Institute for Economic Research in Munich, contributing significantly to its Developing Countries Department. He effectively served as editor-in-chief of the Afrika-Studien series, which published over 40 scholarly volumes between 1975 and 1999.

He conducted extended stays in South West Africa (1956–57) and South Africa (1963–64), experiences that shaped his three-decade involvement in development cooperation across more than 25 countries in Africa and Asia.

Halbach's empirical findings—demonstrating that market-oriented economies often achieved better economic and social outcomes than centrally planned ones—helped incite discussions within the German Federal Ministry for Economic Cooperation and Development (BMZ), influencing a policy shift toward market-based strategies.

He played a notable role in pre-independence Namibia, coordinating over 20 sector-focused studies and crafting a comprehensive development master plan; his work informed policy decisions adopted by the Presidential office in Windhoek.

Among his major academic publications are:

- Ghana als Wirtschaftspartner (= Afrika-Studien, No. 83). Weltforum Verlag, Cologne 1969. ISBN 3-8039-0083-3
- Aspekte der Industrialisierung in Tropisch-Afrika (= Afrika-Studien, No. 86). Weltforum Verlag, Munich 1971. ISBN 3-8039-0086-8
- Theory and Practice of Project Evaluation in Developing Countries (with Dieter Bender). Weltforum Verlag, Munich 1972. ISBN 3-8039-5070-5
- Industriestruktur und Industrialisierungspolitik in Uganda 1963–1972 (= Ifo-Forschungsberichte, No. 50). Duncker & Humblot, Berlin 1974. ISBN 3-428-03306-3
- Die südafrikanischen Bantu-Homelands: Konzeption, Struktur, Entwicklungsperspektiven (= Afrika-Studien, No. 90). Weltforum Verlag, Munich 1976. ISBN 3-8039-0090-6
- Multinationale Unternehmen und Zulieferungen in der Dritten Welt (= Afrika-Studien, No. 109). Weltforum Verlag, Munich 1985. ISBN 3-8039-0109-0
- Namibia: Wirtschaft, Politik, Gesellschaft zehn Jahre nach der Unabhängigkeit (= Afrika-Studien, No. 121). Lit Verlag, Münster 2000. ISBN 3-8258-5089-6

== Literary work ==
Halbach authored numerous adventure novels inspired by Karl May, published by Blitz-Verlag in Munich. These works expanded the Karl May universe with new stories featuring familiar characters:

- Kara ben Nemsi – Neue Abenteuer series*

Die El-Wahabiya-Bande (Vol. 16, 1998). ISBN 3-89485-516-7
Der Karawanentod (Vol. 17, 1998). ISBN 3-89485-517-5
Auf dem Weg zu Halef (Vol. 18, 1999). ISBN 3-89485-518-3
Im Tal der Herba Juvenilis (Vol. 19, 1999). ISBN 3-89485-519-1
Der Blick des Tetrapylon (Vol. 20, 2000). ISBN 3-89485-520-5
Schwarzes Elfenbein (Vol. 21, 2001). ISBN 3-89485-521-3
Von Leptis Magna in den Dschebel Nefusa (Vol. 22, 2002). ISBN 3-89485-522-1
König Salomons Diamanten (Vol. 23, 2003). ISBN 3-89485-523-X

- Im Wilden Westen Nordamerikas series*

Im Land der Saguaros (Vol. 14, 1998). ISBN 3-89485-514-0
Der Schatz der Kristallhöhle (Vol. 15, 1999). ISBN 3-89485-515-9
Das Gold der Apachen (Vol. 16, 2000). ISBN 3-89485-524-8
Bloody Fox (Vol. 17, 2001). ISBN 3-89485-525-6
Blutige Schluchten (Vol. 19, 2003). ISBN 3-89485-526-4
Schamanen (Vol. 20, 2004). ISBN 3-89485-527-2

Halbach succeeded in bringing Karl May’s adventure world vividly back to life while setting his own accents. Thus Karl May’s heroes returned to the stage not as subordinate companions but as equal partners. Halef, for instance, often took on traits of Halbach’s own son as a “little friend and protector,” while Shatterhand acquired a gentleness and humanity that stood in contrast to Ralf Wolter’s brutal interpretation in the 1960s film adaptations.

In addition, Halbach composed witty and reflective poetry in the tradition of Wilhelm Busch, embracing themes from school life to professional experiences.

== Artistic work ==
An avid painter, Halbach’s work often fused abstract, figurative, and humorous elements.

Apart from Karl May and Africa, Halbach’s other lifelong passion was painting. Already as a schoolboy he created fantastic pictures. His work Conversation Under Four Eyes even entered the annals of his Hamburg-Volksdorf high school when he and two friends replaced works by a local artist on exhibition at the school with their own painting. Painting, too, allowed Halbach’s exuberant imagination to flow freely. Over 68 years he created more than 1,000 “crazy pictures,” often accompanied by humorous short texts.

In November 2017, his paintings were exhibited in a solo show titled The Fabulous World of Axel Halbach at the KreativRaum "An der Schwelle" in Ismaning. The exhibition was covered by Süddeutsche Zeitung, one of Germany’s leading newspapers, and accompanied by a photograph of the gallery showing Halbach’s paintings on the walls.

“The 83-year-old has been painting since his youth, and the works in the KreativRaum demonstrate the wide range that has developed over 60 years.
Colorful fabulous creatures snake through the frames, while, opposite, subtly sketched instruments convey the sound of smooth jazz. Extended stays abroad in Africa and Asia shaped Halbach, who worked for a long time in development aid. Allusions to masks and African patterns can be sensed in his works.”

== Reception ==
Halbach’s literary works—particularly his Karl May–inspired novels—have been discussed in scholarship on German popular literature.

- **Günther Wüste**, in KMG-Nachrichten No. 195 (2018), provided an overview of Halbach's literary career.
- **Volker Krischel** examined Halbach’s creative adaptations of Karl May’s universe in Karl May in Leipzig No. 117 (2019), describing them as “the somewhat different world of Karl May” (Die etwas andere Welt des Karl May).
- Krischel also reviewed Blitz-Verlag’s reissues of Halbach’s novels in Karl May & Co. No. 161 (2020), characterizing them as “Karl May’s heroes on somewhat different trails.

== Death ==
He died on 12 December 2022 in Ismaning, where he had lived for many years.
