= List of railway stations in Hamburg =

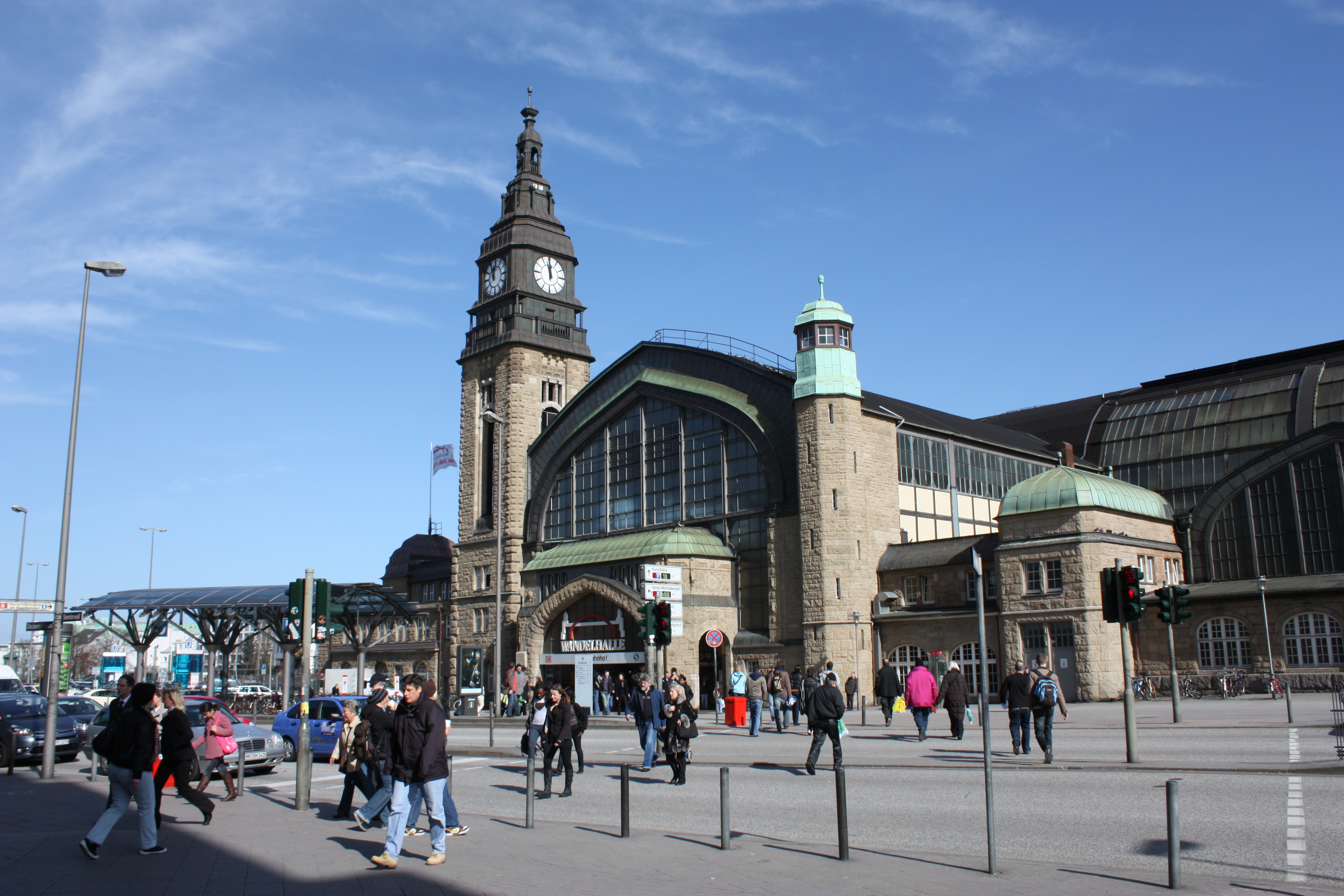
Station building of Hamburg Hauptbahnhof

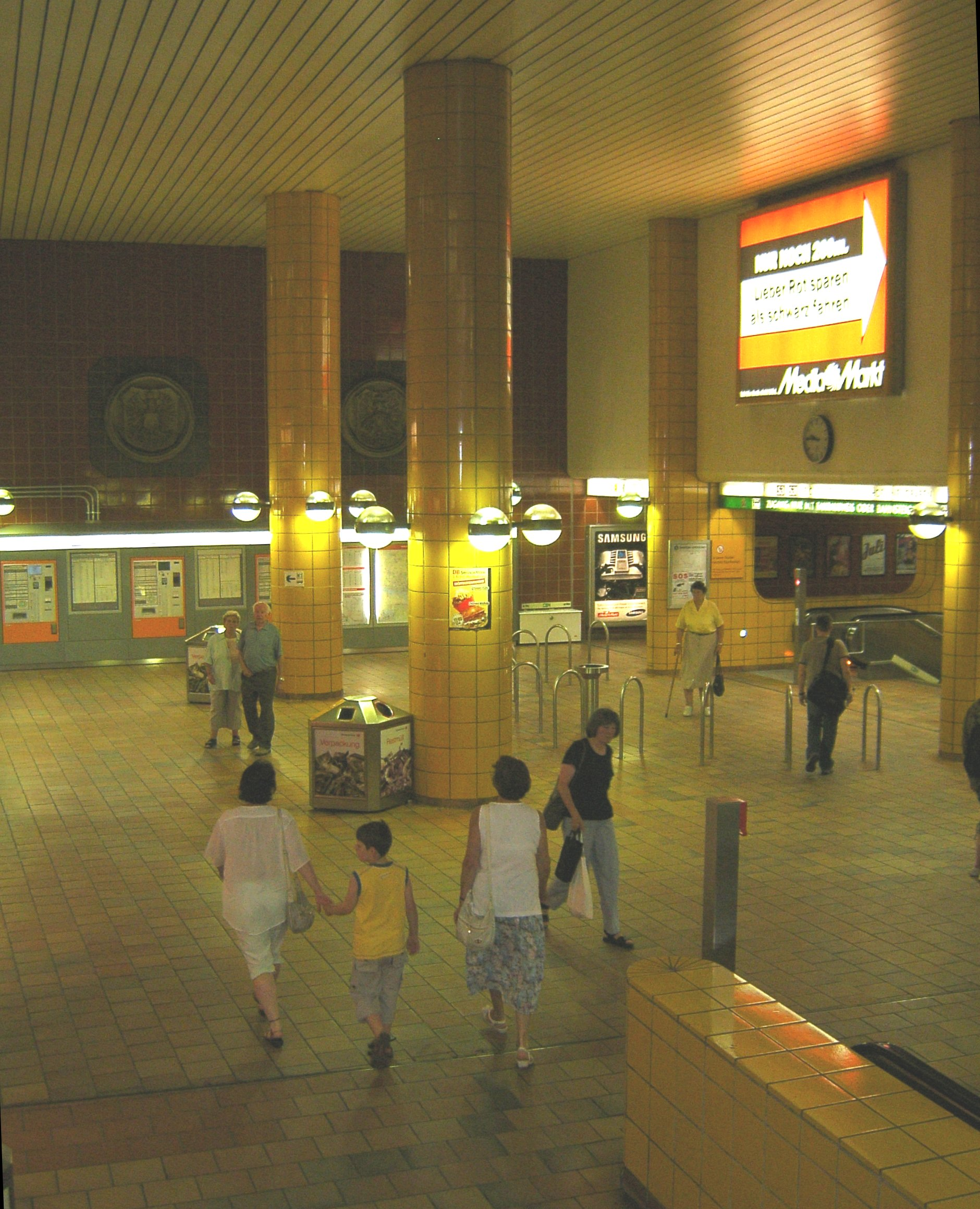
Entrance level to the metro at Hamburg-Harburg station

This is a list of stations used by long distance passenger trains, located in the German state and city of Hamburg. All stations are operated by DB Station&Service and serviced by trains of the Deutsche Bahn, the German national railway company.

== Railway stations ==
There are several metro stations, operated by DB stations&service for the Hamburg S-Bahn and by the Hamburger Hochbahn for the Hamburg U-Bahn.
These stations are omitted here and listed in the list of Hamburg S-Bahn stations and list of Hamburg U-Bahn stations.

Five railway stations in Hamburg give access to the long distance train service ICE, IC, NJ, Flixtrain, which are Hamburg Hbf, Hamburg Dammtor, Hamburg Altona, Hamburg Bergedorf and Hamburg Hamburg.

Station	Opened	Type^{[B]}	Category^{[A]}	Station code
Hamburg Hauptbahnhof	1906	Bf	1	2514
Hamburg Dammtor	1903	Hp	2	2513
Hamburg-Altona	1898	Bf	1	2517
Hamburg-Harburg	1897	Bf	2	2519

== Notes ==
A. German railway station categories assigned by the DB Station&Service, denoting the service level available at the station.
B. Several codes are used to differentiate between various railway station types of Germany.

== See also ==
- Railway stations in Germany
- List of Hamburg S-Bahn stations
- List of Hamburg U-Bahn stations
