= Buckhorn Lake =

Buckhorn Lake may refer to one of several lakes:

- Buckhorn Lake (Ontario), Canada
- Buckhorn Lake (Kentucky), United States
- Buckhorn Lake (Houston), Texas, United States

== See also ==
- Lower Buckhorn Lake, Peterborough County, Ontario, Canada
