= Buckhorn Lake (Houston) =

- Location within Texas Location within the United States
- Location: Harris County, Texas
- Coordinates: 29°53′10″N 95°08′00″W
- Type: reservoir
- Basin countries: United States
- Surface elevation: 16 ft (5 m)

Buckhorn Lake is a private lake in Harris County in the state of Texas, United States. The lake is approximately 60 acres (24 ha) filled with cypress trees and was created by an underwater creek and spring.

It is well stocked for fishing.
