= Großhansdorf =

- Municipality
- Coat of arms

- Location of Großhansdorf within Stormarn district
- Interactive map of Großhansdorf
- Location within Germany Location within Schleswig-Holstein
- Coordinates: 53°40′N 10°16′E
- Country: Germany
- State: Schleswig-Holstein
- District: Stormarn

Government
  - Mayor: Janhinnerk Voß

Area
  - Total: 11.2 km^{2} (4.3 sq mi)
- Elevation: 49 m (161 ft)

Population (2025-12-31)
  - Total: 9,476
  - Density: 846/km^{2} (2,190/sq mi)
- Time zone: UTC+01:00 (CET)
  - Summer (DST): UTC+02:00 (CEST)
- Postal codes: 22927
- Dialling codes: 04102
- Vehicle registration: OD
- Website: www.grosshansdorf.de

Großhansdorf is a municipality in the district of Stormarn, in Schleswig-Holstein, Germany. It is situated approximately 3 km east of Ahrensburg, and 25 km northeast of Hamburg.

== History ==
Großhansdorf was first mentioned in 1274 in a deed of Hamburg's St. Catherine's Church congregation, to which Großhansdorf was affiliated at that time. In 1435 the city of Hamburg acquired Großhansdorf and administered it as part of its forest villages domain (Walddörfer), consisting of a series of Hamburgian exclaves surrounded by then else Holstein territories. In 1642 the erection of a water mill is recorded, which operated until the 19th century. Since 1701 Großhansdorf was the seat of a forest rider (German: Waldreiter), an official of Hamburg's police administration, which is recalled in today's coat-of-arms of Großhansdorf. Hamburg then formed a free imperial city within the Holy Roman Empire.

By 1806 the rotation of arable fields among the resident farming families — as typical within crop rotation — was replaced by coupling fields (German: Verkoppelung) to become fixed particular family properties, which thus could be alienated — such as by sale or compulsory auction — and therefore pledged to secure credits. So agriculture was integrated into monetary economy. Between 1811 and 1813 Großhansdorf formed a part of the First French Empire, Bouches-de-l'Elbe département, before it was restored to Hamburg, then forming a sovereign city state within the new loose German Confederation.

In 1872 Groß-Hansdorf (as it was then spelled) and neighbouring Schmalenbeck merged in Groß-Hansdorf-Schmalenbeck, a municipality within the state of the Free and Hanseatic City of Hamburg, which then still consisted of the eponymous city and a number of smaller municipalities and towns. Since 1921 the electric elevated forest villages railway, the eastern part of today's U 1 line of Hamburg's underground and elevated railway) is connecting Großhansdorf by three stations (Großhansdorf, Kiekut and Schmalenbeck) with Hamburg.

By the territorial redeployment through the Greater Hamburg Act Groß-Hansdorf-Schmalenbeck was ceded from the state of Hamburg to the Prussian Province of Schleswig-Holstein with effect of 1 April 1937, forming since a municipality within the Stormarn district. The name Groß-Hansdorf prevailed in colloquial usage.

The British occupation forces elevated the province to the State of Schleswig-Holstein in 1946. For one and a half years (1949–1951) Groß-Hansdorf-Schmalenbeck formed a part of Ahrensburg collective municipality, before it regained municipal status, under the now official name Großhansdorf since. The inhabitants spread over the locality Schmalenbeck (c. 60%) and the locality Großhansdorf (unofficially: Alt-Großhansdorf; c. 40%). Following the massive destructions by Bombing of Hamburg in World War II many a homeless Hamburger moved to Großhansdorf.
