= Buckhorn, Michigan =

- Unincorporated community
- Location within the state of Michigan
- Country: United States
- State: Michigan
- County: Berrien
- Township: Royalton
- Elevation: 653 ft (199 m)
- Time zone: UTC-5 (Eastern (EST))
  - Summer (DST): UTC-4 (EDT)
- ZIP code(s): 49103
- Area code: 269
- GNIS feature ID: 622188

Buckhorn is an unincorporated community in Berrien County, in the U.S. state of Michigan.

== History ==
The community took its name from the Buckhorn Tavern, a local landmark to travelers in the 1830s.
