= Volksdorf =

- Quarter of Hamburg
- Location in Hamburg
- Interactive map of Volksdorf
- Location within Germany Location within Hamburg
- Coordinates: 53°38′59″N 10°11′03″E
- Country: Germany
- State: Hamburg
- City: Hamburg
- Borough: Wandsbek

Area
  - Total: 11.6 km^{2} (4.5 sq mi)

Population (2024-12-31)
  - Total: 20,608
  - Density: 1,780/km^{2} (4,600/sq mi)
- Time zone: UTC+01:00 (CET)
  - Summer (DST): UTC+02:00 (CEST)
- Postal codes: 22359
- Dialling codes: 040
- Vehicle registration: HH

Volksdorf (German pronunciation: [ˈfɔlksˌdɔʁf]) is a quarter of Hamburg. It is situated in the north east of the city, about 15 km from the centre of the city.

Volksdorf belongs to the borough of Wandsbek. It covers an area of 11.6 km^{2} and has 20,685 inhabitants (as of 2020).

== History ==
The area has been settled since the Stone Age.

== Geography ==
Volksdorf borders Schleswig-Holstein to the east, north and north east. The biggest local town is Ahrensburg which lies in the Stormarn district of Schleswig-Holstein. Volksdorf borders Bergstedt in the north-west, Sasel in the west and Farmsen-Berne in the south west. Volksdorf’s south west border features the Volksdorfer Woods and borders with Meiendorf (a part of the Rahlstedt quarter of Hamburg)

== Demographics ==
In 2013:

- Under 18s: 20.6% (Hamburg average 15.6%)
- 65 and over: 25.5% (Hamburg average 18.8%)
- Non-Germans: 4.9% (Hamburg average 14%)
- Unemployed: 2.3% (Hamburg average 5.6%)

Volksdorf is one of the wealthier districts of Hamburg. The average wage is about 50500 euros which is almost double that of the Hamburg average.

== Elections ==
Volksdorf is part of the Alstertal-Walddörfer electoral district for the purposes of elections of the Hamburg Parliament and the district elections. Parliamentary elections in 2011 were voted as follows:

- SPD 43.6% (+14.9)
- CDU 23.3% (-23.4)
- GAL 15.4% (+2.2)
- FDP 9.8% (+3.3)
- Die Linke 4.0% (+0.2)
- Others 3.9% (+2.7)

== Religion ==
There are two Lutheran churches in the parish: Kirche am Rockenhof and Kirche St. Gabriel. The St. Johannes Community Centre had to be closed in 2002 due to budget problems. There is one Catholic Church: Heilig Kreuz (Holy Cross) Church. There is also a free church in Vörn Barkholt, the Lukaskirche der Christengemeinschaft (St. Luke's Church of the Christian Community) north of the Catholic church and a New Apostolic Church on the Eulenkrugpfad.

== Culture and tourist attractions ==
The Bürgerhaus Koralle is central to cultural life in Volksdorf and houses a cinema and two bars.

Historical farm houses and building are displayed in the Volksdorf open-air museum (Museumsdorf Volksdorf). Working farm days are held four or five times a years in which historical hand working techniques and example of how people lived on farms in the past are exhibited.

Konzerte junger Künstler im Spiekerhus e. V. (Concerts by young people) is an association which puts on six concerts a year in Volksdorf open-air museum.

Kulturkreis Walddörfer e. V. ("culture circle") was founded in 1978 in order to increase the programme of cultural events in Volksdorf. The association has about 450 voluntary members and puts on about 20 events a year (mainly in the Ohlendorff-Villa) Events include theatre, concerts, readings, lecturers, cabaret and city tours. The association is also concerned with preserving the Ohlendorffsche Villa (a listed building, built 1928 by architect Erich Elingius) as a venue for cultural events.

The Bürgerverein Walddörfer (civic association) organises resident engagement on municipal matters and also mediates between government officers and residents of the area. The association covers the Walddörfer area of the Wandsbek borough which includes the quarters of Bergstedt, Duvenstedt, Lemsahl-Mellingstedt, Volksdorf and Wohldorf-Ohlstedt.

The association „Pfadfinder & Pfadfinderinnenbund Nordlicht e.V." (scouting) has offered environment conservation activities for children in the area for over 40 years. The association is situated in Wulfsdorfer Weg.

There are concerts almost every week in the churches of St. Gabriel and am Rockenhof.

The Volksdorf Quarter Party (a kind of street party) takes place every year in the first week of September. The event includes a firework display and a bike race.

The Weiße Rose (White Rose) square is situated in the centre of Volksdorf. It contains a monument to the White Rose resistance fighters.

=== Nature reserves ===
Volksdorf is home to one of 29 nature reserves in Hamburg. The Volksdorfer Teichwiesen ("Volksdorf pond meadows") features the river Saselbek as well as a tunnel valley which was granted environment protection in 1993 and is home to many endangered species.

=== Sport ===
Allhorn Stadium is situated on the grounds of Walddörfer-Gymnasium, one of the local high schools. The stadium is also used by the local sport association, Walddörfer SV.

Volkdorf is also home to Parkbad (run by Bäderland Hamburg GmbH). The swimming complex features a two indoor swimming pools, a paddling and swimming area for children and babies, a heated outdoor swimming pool and a sun bathing area.

== Economy and infrastructure ==
The centre of Volksdorf (Platz „Weiße Rose" – White Rose square) is a pedestrianised area and feature supermarkets, shops, cafes and a post office. There is also a shopping centre called „Eulenkrug-Passage" at the crossing between Wiesenhöfen/Eulenkrugstraße. It contains a mixture of shops, food outlets and medical practices as well as a supermarket. It also has capacity for 180 cars in an underground garage.

There is also an outdoor market which takes place every Wednesday and Saturday in the area outside of Volksdorf underground station. There are regularly more than 100 stalls present with sellers from Volksdorf and the surrounding areas. The market also takes place in the centre of Volkdsorf twice a year.

=== Public transport ===
Volksdorf is on the Hamburg underground system which runs as elevated line in the area and is operated by the Hamburger Hochbahn. It has four underground stations: Meiendorfer Weg, Volksdorf, Buckhorn, and Buchenkamp, all of which are served by the U1 line. Three bus lines also serve Volksdorf via the Bundesstraße 75 (locally known as Meiendorfer Straße).

=== Schools ===
There are four primary schools and three secondary schools in the quarter.

Primary schools

- Schule an den Teichwiesen
- Grundschule Ahrensburger Weg
- Grundschule Eulenkrugstraße
- Grundschule Buckhorn

Secondary schools

- Stadtteilschule Walddörfer (formerly Gesamtschule Walddörfer)
- Gymnasium Buckhorn
- Walddörfer-Gymnasium (designed by the architect Fritz Schumacher)

== Literature ==
- De Spieker. Gesellschaft für Heimatpflege und Heimatforschung in den Hamburgischen Walddörfern e. V. (Hrsg.): 700 Jahre Volksdorf. M+K Hansa Verlag, Hamburg 1996, ISBN 3-920610-73-3.
- Hamburg von Altona bis Zollenspieker. 1. Auflage. Hoffmann und Campe Verlag, Hamburg 2002, ISBN 3-455-11333-8.
- Last Exit Volksdorf. 3. Auflage. C.H.Beck Verlag, ISBN 978-3406624773.

== Notable residents ==
- Emil Maetzel - architect and artist - (1877–1955), lived in Volksdorf
- Ernst Rowohlt - publisher - (1887–1960), lived in Volksdorf and is buried in Volksdorf cemetery
- Boy Gobert - actor - (1925-1986), grew up in Volksdorf and went to school at the local high school.
- Theo Sommer - newspaper editor - (1930–2022), lived in Volksdorf
- Hans Apel - politician - (1932–2011), lived in Volksdorf
- Edgar Hoppe - actor - (*1937), lives in Volksdorf
- Ole von Beust - first mayor of Hamburg 31/10/2001-25/08/2010 - (*1955), is from Volksdorf and completed his schooling at the local high school in 1973
