= Buckhorn Township =

Buckhorn Township may refer to the following townships in the United States:

- Buckhorn Township, Brown County, Illinois
- Buckhorn Township, Harnett County, North Carolina
- Buckhorn Township, Wake County, North Carolina
