= Ohlstedt station =

Railway station in Hamburg, Germany

Ohlstedt
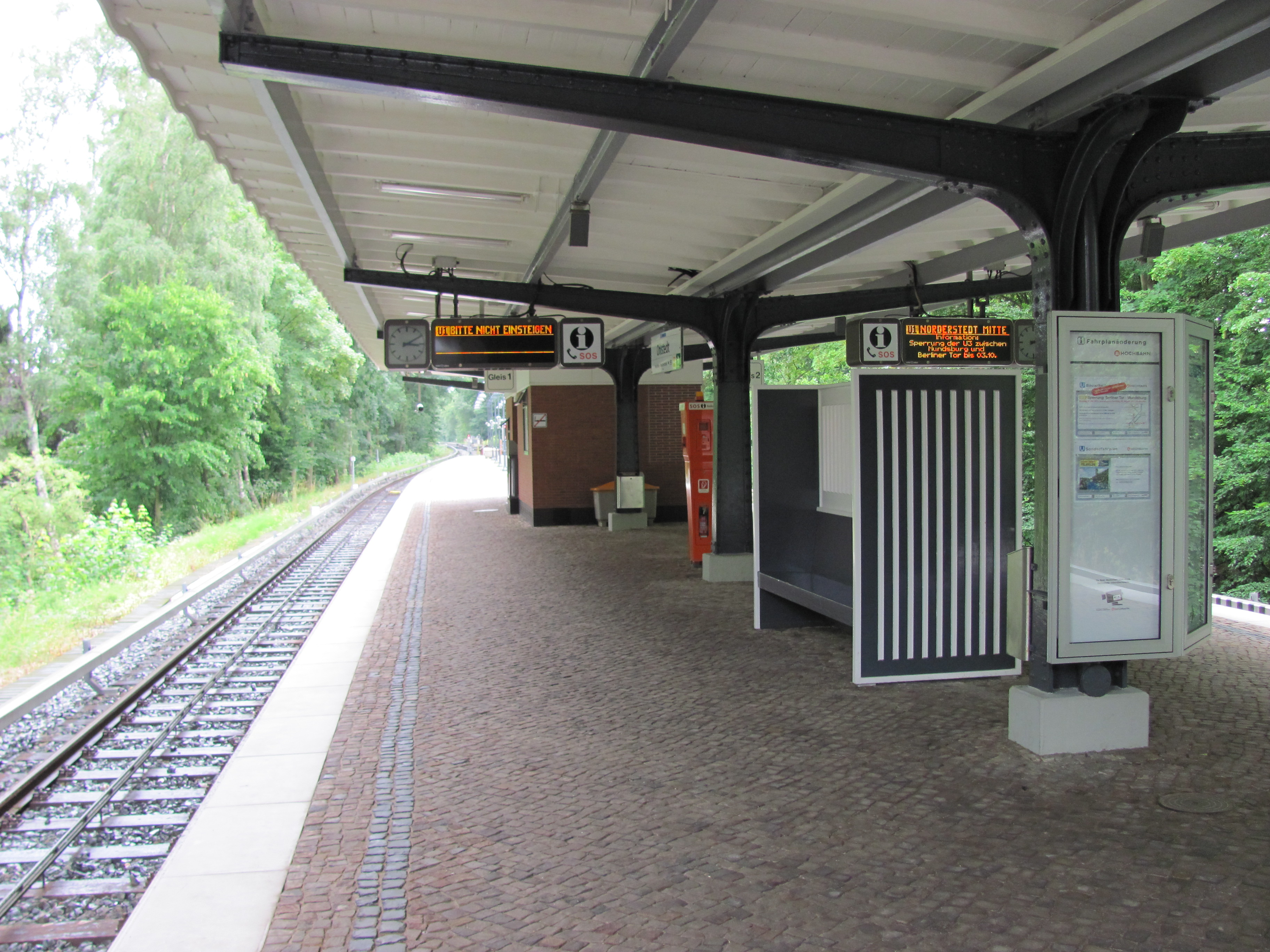

General information
- Location: Alte Dorfstraße; 22397 Hamburg, Germany
- Coordinates: 53°41′41″N 10°08′14″E
- System: Hamburg U-Bahn station
- Operator: Hamburger Hochbahn AG
- Line: U1
- Platforms: 1 island platform
- Tracks: 2
- Connections: Bus, Taxi

Construction
- Structure type: At grade
- Parking: Park and Ride (48 slots)
- Accessible: Yes

Other information
- Station code: HHA: OT
- Fare zone: HVV: B/404 and 504

History
- Opened: 12 September 1918; 107 years ago
- Closed: 22 May 1919 - 1 February 1925
- Electrified: 1 February 1925; 101 years ago
- Former names: 1918-1925 Wohldorf-Ohlstedt

Services
Preceding station	Hamburg U-Bahn	Following station
Hoisbüttel towards Norderstedt Mitte	U1	Terminus
Location
- Location within Hamburg Location within Germany

Ohlstedt is the terminus station on the Ohlstedt branch of Hamburg U-Bahn line U1. The rapid transit station was opened in 1918 and is located in the Hamburg suburb of Wohldorf-Ohlstedt, Germany. Wohldorf-Ohlstedt is part of the Hamburg borough of Wandsbek.

== History ==
At the time the station was opened, Ohlstedt was an enclave of the Free and Hanseatic City of Hamburg. Back in 1918, Wohldorf-Ohlstedt station was part of the Walddörferbahn. In February 1925 the station was electrified and integrated into the Hochbahn (U-Bahn) system, and named "Ohlstedt" in May 1925.

== Layout ==
The station's building and only entrance is located at Alte Dorfstraße, in the district's center. The single island platform and the two side tracks sit along a rail dam.

== Service ==
=== Trains ===
Ohlstedt is served by Hamburg U-Bahn line U1; departures are every 20 minutes, during rush hour every 10 minutes. The travel time to Hamburg Hauptbahnhof is about 36 minutes.

== Gallery ==
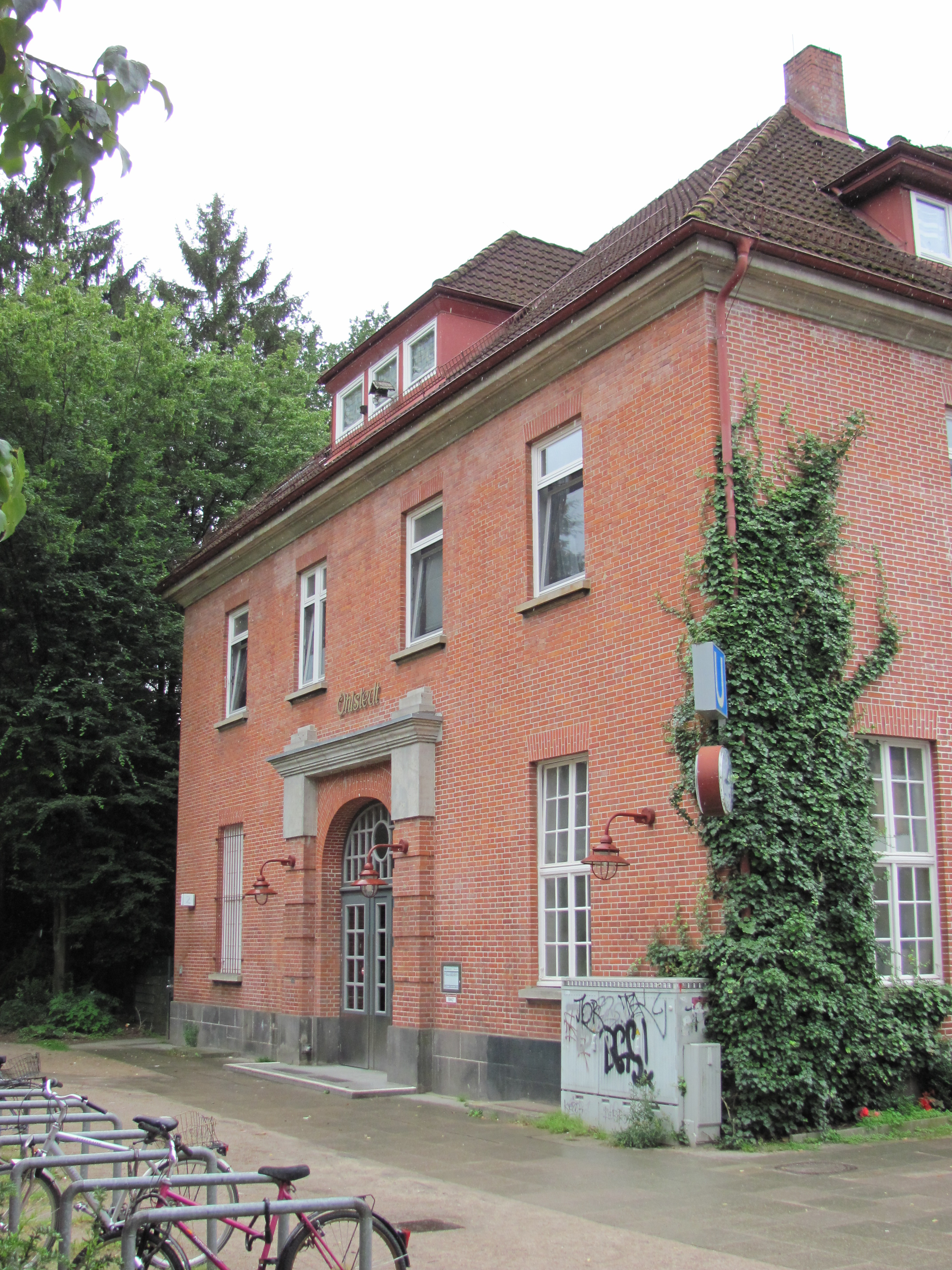
Exterior of the station building

== See also ==
- List of Hamburg U-Bahn stations
