= Großhansdorf station =

Rapid transit station in Germany

Großhansdorf
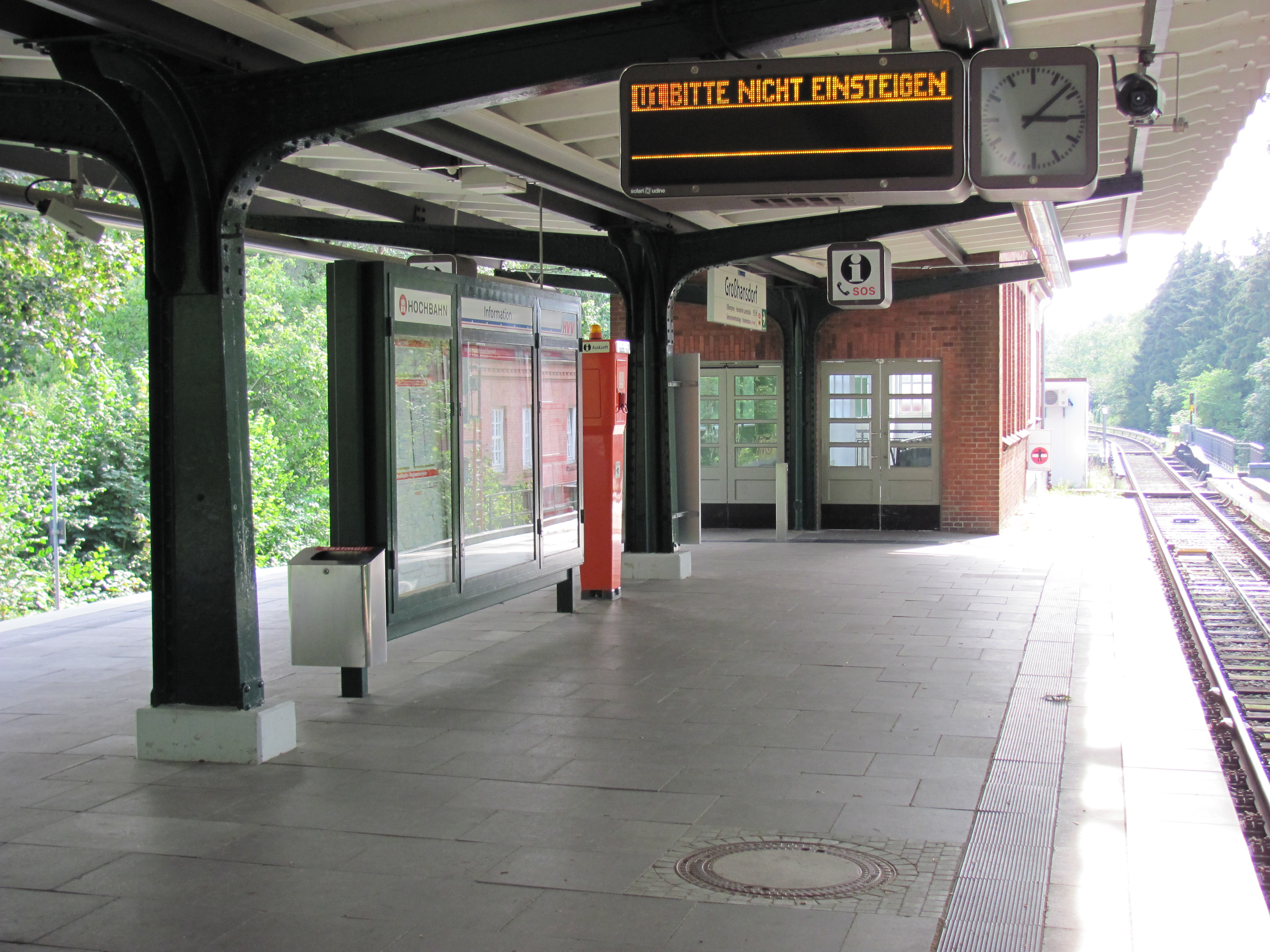

General information
- Location: Marktplatz; 22927 Großhansdorf, Germany
- Coordinates: 53°39′45″N 10°17′12″E
- System: Hamburg U-Bahn station
- Operator: Hamburger Hochbahn AG
- Line: U1
- Platforms: 1 island platform
- Tracks: 2
- Connections: Bus, Taxi

Construction
- Structure type: At grade
- Parking: Park and Ride (62 slots)
- Accessible: Yes

Other information
- Station code: HHA: GH
- Fare zone: HVV: B/505

History
- Opened: 5 November 1921
- Former names: Groß-Hansdorf

Services
Preceding station	Hamburg U-Bahn	Following station
Kiekut towards Norderstedt Mitte	U1	Terminus
Location
- Location within Hamburg Location within Germany

Großhansdorf is the terminus station on the Großhansdorf branch of Hamburg U-Bahn line U1. The rapid transit station was opened in 1921 and is located in the Hamburg suburb of Großhansdorf, Germany. Großhansdorf is a municipality in the German state of Schleswig-Holstein.

== History ==
At the time the station was opened, Großhansdorf was an exclave of the Free and Hanseatic City of Hamburg. With the Greater Hamburg Act of 1937, Großhansdorf was ceded to Schleswig-Holstein and it was temporarily considered to close the station. Since 2007 the station has been handicap-accessible.

== Layout ==
The station's building and only entrance is located at a street junction in the town's center. The single island platform and the two side tracks run along one of these two streets.

== Service ==
=== Trains ===
Großhansdorf is served by Hamburg U-Bahn line U1; departures are every 20 minutes, during rush hour every 10 minutes. The travel time to Hamburg Hauptbahnhof is about 40 minutes.

== Gallery ==
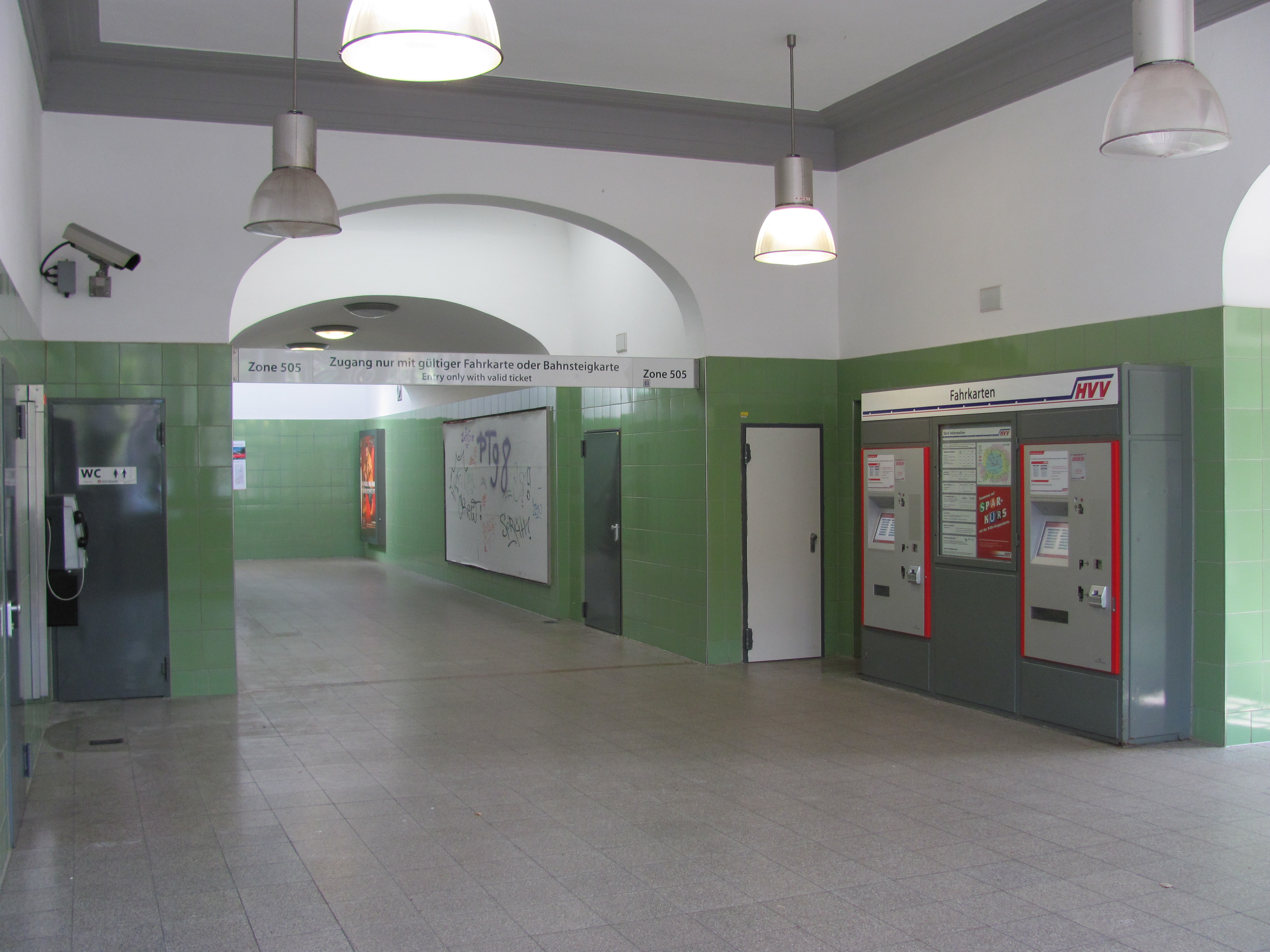
Interior view of the station building

== See also ==
- List of Hamburg U-Bahn stations
