= Norderstedt Mitte station =

Rapid transit station in Germany

Norderstedt Mitte
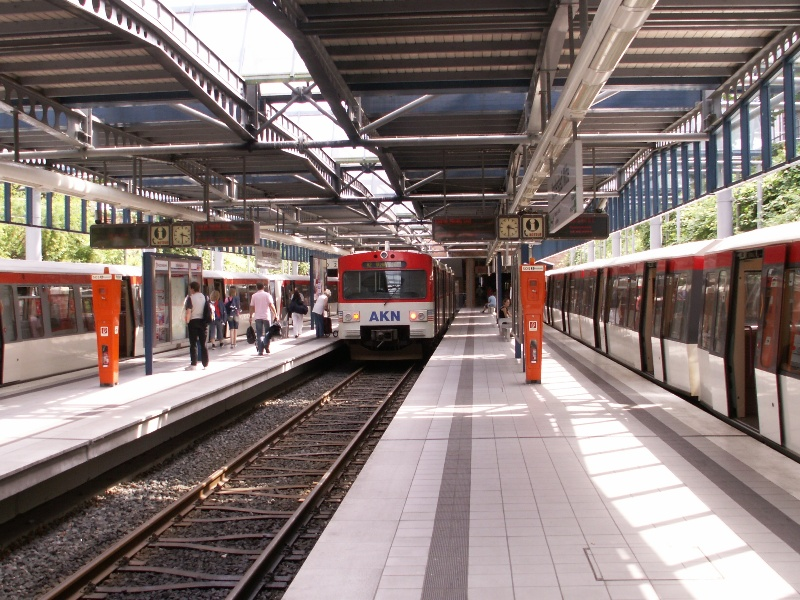

General information
- Location: Rathausallee 31; 22846 Norderstedt; Germany
- Coordinates: 53°42′28″N 9°59′32″E
- System: HVV rapid transit station
- Owner: Verkehrsgesellschaft Norderstedt (VGN)
- Lines: Alster Northern Railway
- Platforms: 2 island platforms
- Tracks: 3
- Connections: Bus, Taxi

Construction
- Structure type: Partially underground
- Parking: Park and ride
- Cycle facilities: Yes
- Accessible: yes

Other information
- Station code: HHA: NO; ID: 8079027
- Fare zone: HVV: B; NAH.SH: 79 (HVV transitional tariff)

History
- Opened: 17 May 1953; 73 years ago
- Rebuilt: in this form on 28 September 1996
- Electrified: 28 September 1996; 29 years ago
- Former names: 1953-1979 Harkseichen-Falkenberg

Services
| Preceding station | | Following station |
|---|---|---|
| Moorbekhalle towards Neumünster | A2 | Terminus |
| Preceding station | Hamburg U-Bahn | Following station |
| Terminus | U1 | Richtweg towards Großhansdorf or Ohlstedt |
Location
- Location within Hamburg Location within Schleswig-Holstein Location within Germany Location within Europe

Norderstedt Mitte station is a railway station in Norderstedt, Germany. It is a terminus for the rapid transit trains of the line U1 of the Hamburg U-Bahn and connects the underground railway with the commuter trains of the AKN railway company line A2 (Alster Northern Railway).

== Station layout ==
The terminus of the U1 is an island platform with the bay platform for changing to the commuter trains of the A2. The platform is partly underground and partly open sub level. There are stairs and escalators to the bus station, and, with a lift and special floor design the station is fully accessible for handicapped people in a wheelchair or blind persons. There are no station personnel but there are ticket machines, CCTV, and an emergency call and information telephone.

== Services ==
The U1 underground trains run every 10 minutes, 5 minutes at rush hours, night service is every 20 minutes from 23:00 to midnight, arriving trains until 01:15. There is an all night service on Friday and Saturday nights every 20 minutes.

The A2 commuter trains run on weekdays every 20 minutes, 10 minutes at rush hours, night service is every 40 minutes from 23:00 to 01:00. Sundays there is a 40 minutes service all day from 06:00 to 01:00.

== See also ==
- Hamburger Verkehrsverbund Public transport association in Hamburg
- Hamburger Hochbahn Operator of the Hamburg U-Bahn
