= Wandsbeker Chaussee station =

Metro and S-Bahn station in Hamburg, Germany

Wandsbeker Chaussee
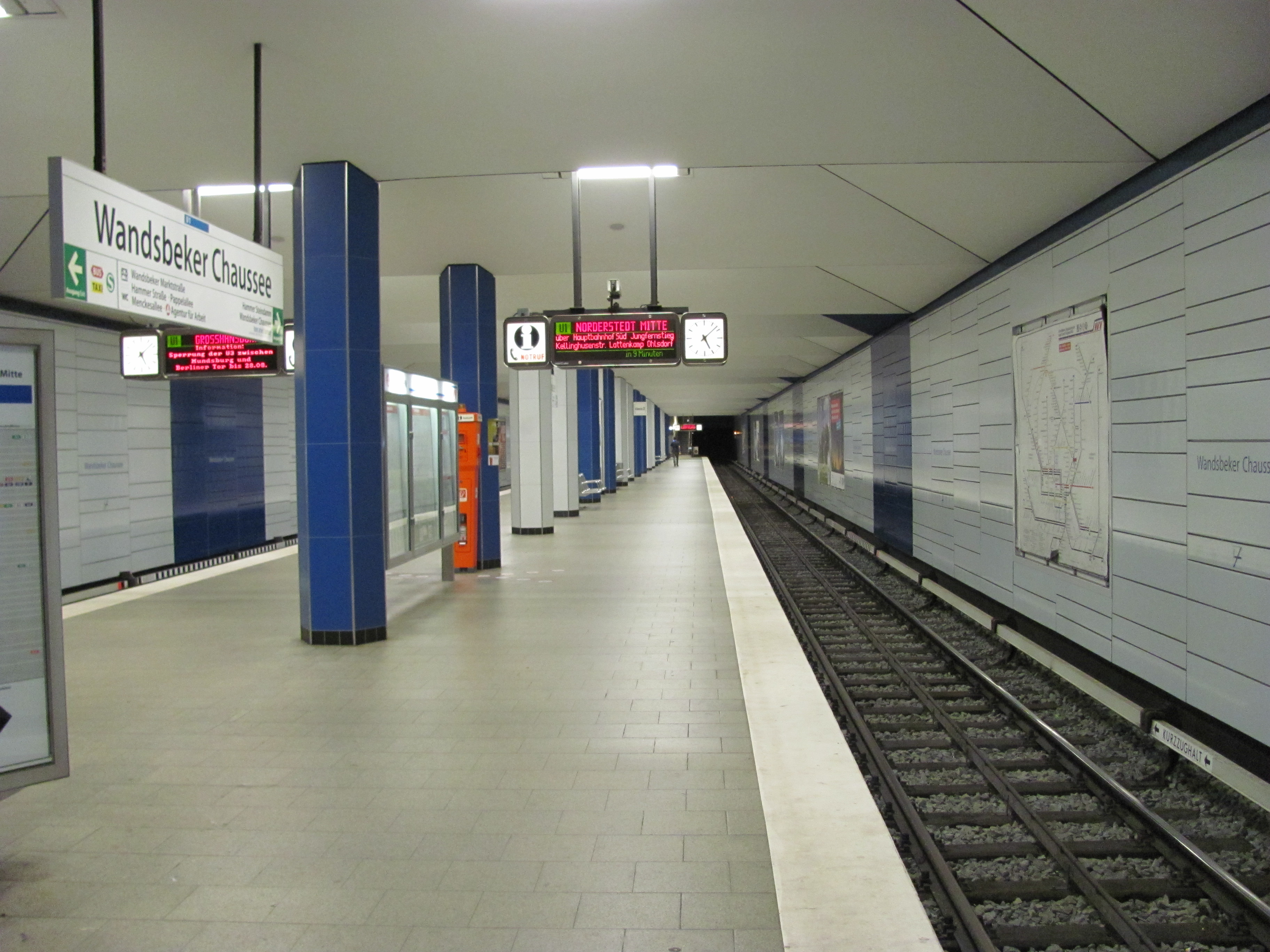

General information
- Location: Wandsbeker Chaussee 288; 22089 Hamburg, Germany
- Coordinates: 53°34′13″N 10°03′35″E
- Operator: Hamburger Hochbahn AG; S-Bahn Hamburg GmbH
- Lines: Hamburg-Altona link line (S1); Freight rail bypass (only freight); U1
- Platforms: 1 island platform (S-Bahn); 1 island platform (U-Bahn)
- Tracks: 4
- Connections: Bus, Taxi

Construction
- Structure type: Terrain cutting (S-Bahn); Underground (U-Bahn)
- Accessible: Yes

Other information
- Station code: HHA: WR; : AWCH (DS-100); 6530
- Fare zone: HVV: A/105
- Website: www.bahnhof.de

History
- Opened: 12 August 1907; 119 years ago 28 October 1962; 63 years ago
- Electrified: 29 January 1908; 118 years ago, 6.3 kV AC system (overhead; turned off in 1955); 10 April 1941; 85 years ago, 1.2 kV DC system (3rd rail)

Services
Preceding station	Hamburg S-Bahn	Following station
Hasselbrook towards Wedel	S1	Friedrichsberg towards Poppenbüttel or Hamburg Airport
Preceding station	Hamburg U-Bahn	Following station
Ritterstraße towards Norderstedt Mitte	U1	Wandsbek Markt towards Großhansdorf or Ohlstedt
Location
- Location within Hamburg Location within Schleswig-Holstein Location within Germany Location within Europe

Wandsbeker Chaussee is a U-Bahn and S-Bahn hub of the rail network in the district of Eilbek in the German city of Hamburg. It is now served by Hamburg S-Bahn line S1 and Hamburg U-Bahn line U1 and consists of two separate stations for the S-Bahn and U-Bahn. It is classified by Deutsche Bahn as a category 4 station.

== History ==
Today's S-Bahn station was established in 1906 as part of the extension of the link line to Ohlsdorf as a station for the Hamburg-Altonaer Stadt- und Vorortbahn (Hamburg-Altona City and Suburban railway, the predecessor of the S-Bahn). The name S-Bahn was not used not until 1934.

The U-Bahn station was taken into service in 1962 with the opening of the new U-Bahn line to Wandsbek. The intermediate level with counter areas has been rebuilt several times: the ticket offices were reduced or eliminated, the ticket machines have been replaced several times (initially with numerous single price vending machines and later with multiple ticket machines) and the locker facilities have been removed. The platform remained largely in its original condition until 2008. In 2009, the walls behind the tracks were completely redecorated. Since then, the tiles have borne an image in different shades of blue, similar to Wartenau station, which had earlier been given a pattern in shades of red.

== Structure ==
The station is located at Wandsbeker Chaussee, on the border between the districts of Hamburg Eilbek and Wandsbek. The S-Bahn tracks are in a cutting below the road and cross it at approximately right angles. The central platform of the S-Bahn starts just south of Wandsbeker Chaussee and extends below Pappelallee. The Hamburg freight rail bypass runs a few metres to the east and parallel with the tracks of the S-Bahn.

The U-Bahn station is located on two underground levels below the S-Bahn. Its central platform is located approximately between Seumestraße and Menckesallee under Wandsbeker Chaussee. At both ends, there are stairs that each lead to lobbies, which are accessible to the surface via multiple exits.

No direct path has been built between the S-Bahn and the U-Bahn stations. Connecting passengers must therefore walk a short distance on the surface.

== S-Bahn and U-Bahn services ==
The following services stop at the station:

Line	Route
U1	Norderstedt Mitte – Richtweg – Garstedt – Ochsenzoll – Kiwittsmoor – Langenhorn Nord – Langenhorn Markt – Fuhlsbüttel Nord – Fuhlsbüttel – Klein Borstel – Ohlsdorf – Sengelmannstraße – Alsterdorf – Lattenkamp – Hudtwalckerstraße – Kellinghusenstraße – Klosterstern – Hallerstraße – Stephansplatz – Jungfernstieg – Meßberg – Steinstraße – Hauptbahnhof Süd – Lohmühlenstraße – Lübecker Straße – Wartenau – Ritterstraße – Wandsbeker Chaussee – Wandsbek Markt – Straßburger Straße – Alter Teichweg – Wandsbek-Gartenstadt – Trabrennbahn – Farmsen – Berne – Meiendorfer Weg – Volksdorf | – Buckhorn – Hoisbüttel – Ohlstedt | – Buchenkamp – Ahrensburg West – Ahrensburg Ost – Schmalenbeck – Kiekut – Großhansdorf
S1	Wedel – Rissen – Sülldorf – Iserbrook – Blankenese – Hochkamp – Klein Flottbek (Botanischer Garten) – Othmarschen – Bahrenfeld – Altona – Königstraße – Reeperbahn – Landungsbrücken – Stadthausbrücke – Jungfernstieg – Hauptbahnhof – Berliner Tor – Landwehr – Hasselbrook – Wandsbeker Chaussee – Friedrichsberg – Barmbek – Alte Wöhr (Stadtpark) – Rübenkamp (City Nord) – Ohlsdorf | – Hamburg Airport (Flughafen) | – Kornweg (Klein Borstel) – Hoheneichen – Wellingsbüttel – Poppenbüttel

== Gallery ==
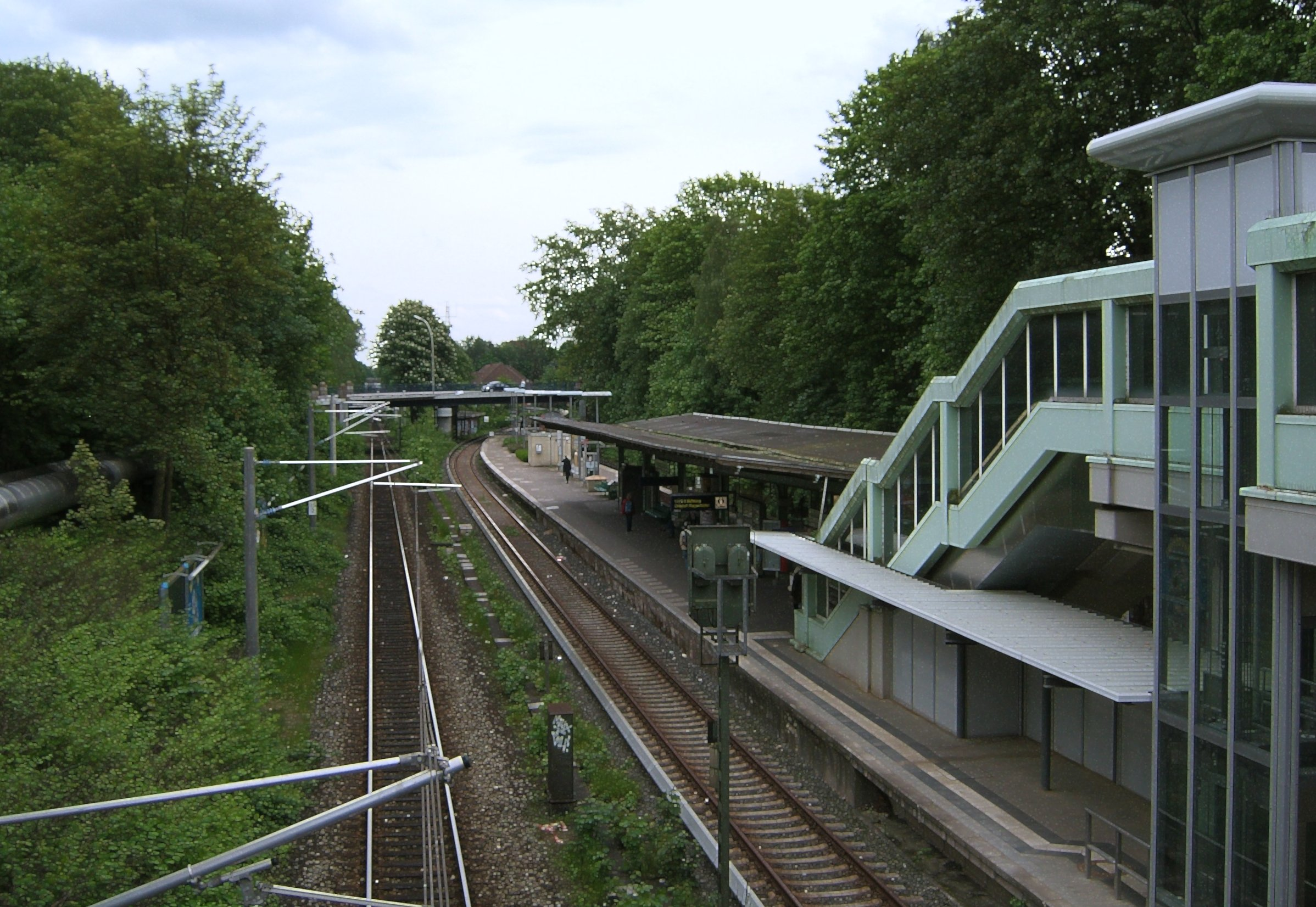
Platforms of Wandsbeker Chaussee S-Bahn station

== See also ==
- List of Hamburg S-Bahn stations
- List of Hamburg U-Bahn stations
