= Uhlandstraße station =

Uhlandstraße station may refer to:

- Uhlandstraße station (Berlin U-Bahn)
- Uhlandstraße station (Hamburg U-Bahn)
