= Dulsberg =

Area of Hamburg, Germany

- Quarter of Hamburg
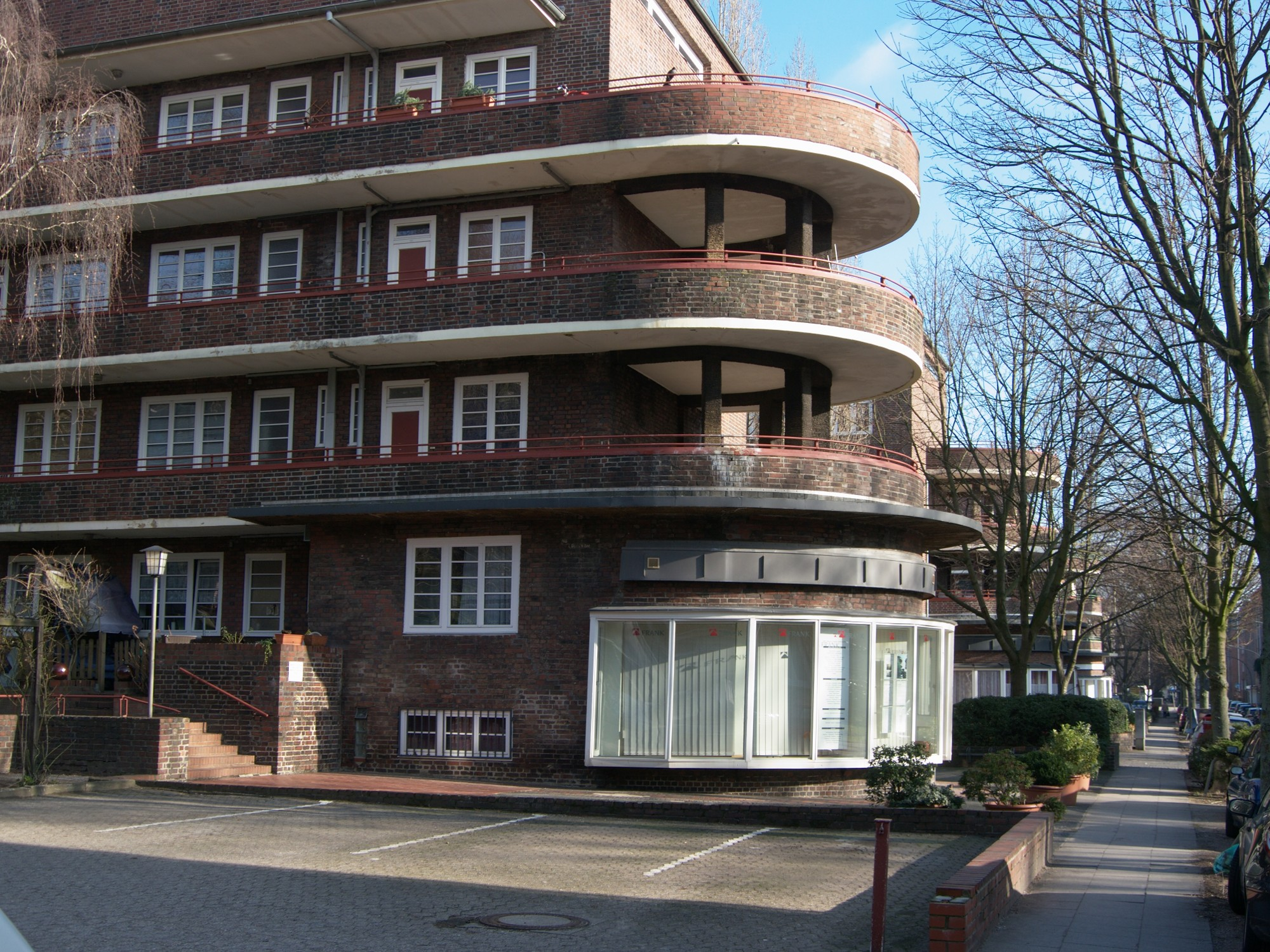
- Laubenganghäuser

- Location of Dulsberg in Hamburg
- Interactive map of Dulsberg
- Location within Germany Location within Hamburg
- Coordinates: 53.58166°N 10.063333°E
- Country: Germany
- State: Hamburg
- City: Hamburg
- Borough: Hamburg-Nord

Area
  - Total: 12 km^{2} (4.6 sq mi)

Population (2024-12-31)
  - Total: 17,230
  - Density: 1,400/km^{2} (3,700/sq mi)
- Time zone: UTC+01:00 (CET)
  - Summer (DST): UTC+02:00 (CEST)
- Dialling codes: 040
- Vehicle registration: HH

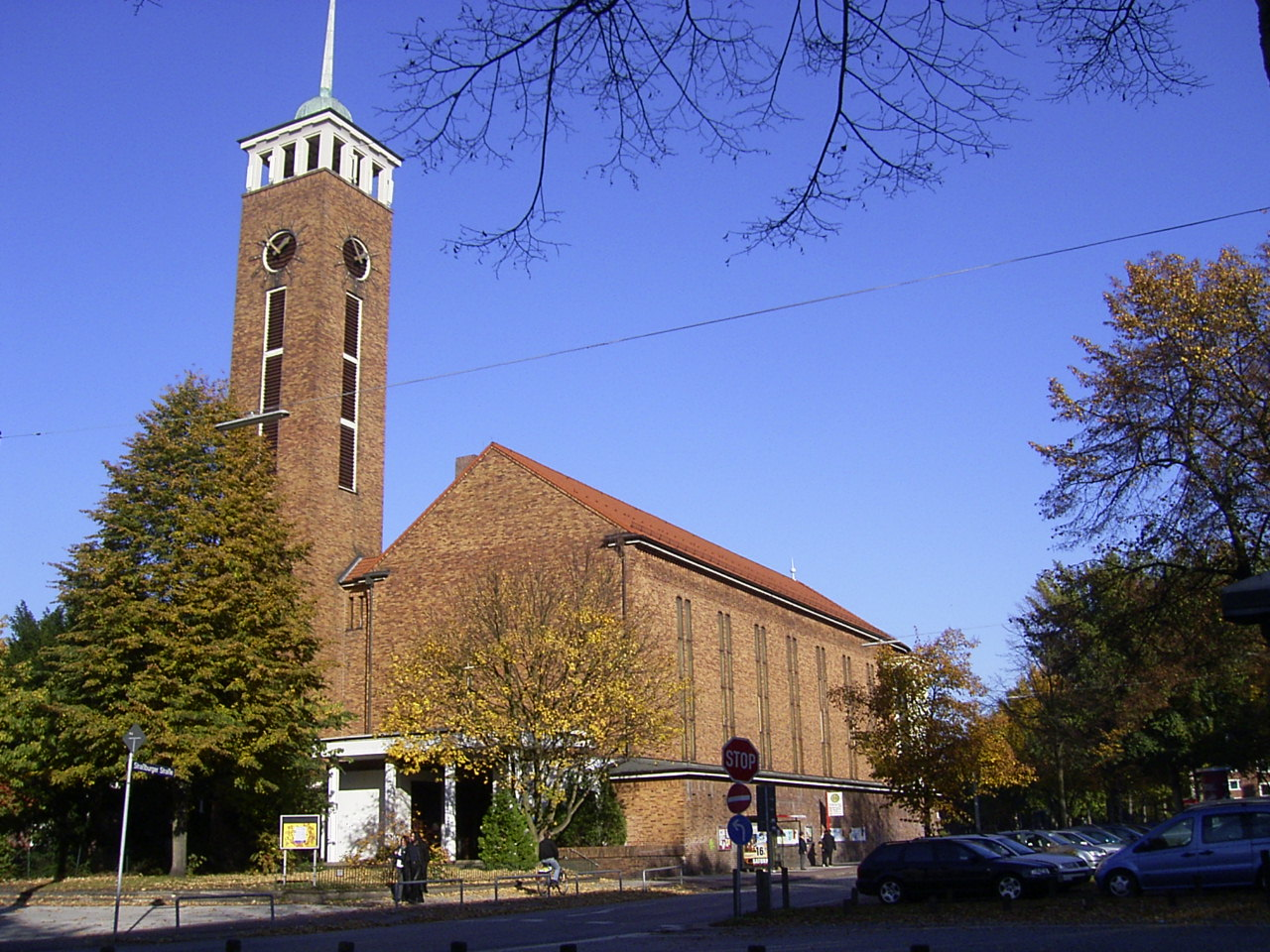
"Frohbotschaftskirche" church at the "Straßburger Platz", a central square of the quarter

Dulsberg (German pronunciation: [ˈdʊlsbɛʁk]) is a quarter of Hamburg, Germany, in the borough of Hamburg-Nord. In the east and the south it borders Wandsbek.

== History ==
- 1906: the station "Friedrichsberg" was opened by Hamburg S-Bahn
- 1910: the second great fire of Hamburg
- Up to 1951 Dulsberg hill was part of Barmbek

== Politics ==
These are the results of Dulsberg in the Hamburg state election:

Election	SPD	Greens	Left	CDU	AfD	FDP	Others
2020	37,2 %	25,2 %	14,3 %	5,6 %	5,6 %	2,6 %	9,5 %
2015	47,5 %	12,0 %	13,7 %	9,4 %	6,3 %	3,6 %	7,5 %
2011	52,2 %	11,5 %	11,2 %	12,9 %	–	3,5 %	8,7 %
2008	42,9 %	9,3 %	11,5 %	29,2 %	–	3,0 %	4,1 %
2004	38,8 %	12,7 %	–	35,8 %	–	2,2 %	10,5 %
2001	46,8 %	8,2 %	0,7 %	18,8 %	–	3,0 %	22,5 %
1997	44,6 %	15,0 %	1,3 %	20,4 %	–	2,1 %	16,6 %
1993	50,4 %	13,4 %	–	16,3 %	–	2,6 %	17,3 %

== Architecture ==
The Dulsberg quarter was planned by the City of Hamburg's Director of Constructions, Fritz Schumacher in the 1920s. After World War II, the buildings were reconstructed using the original outer walls.

== Public Transport ==
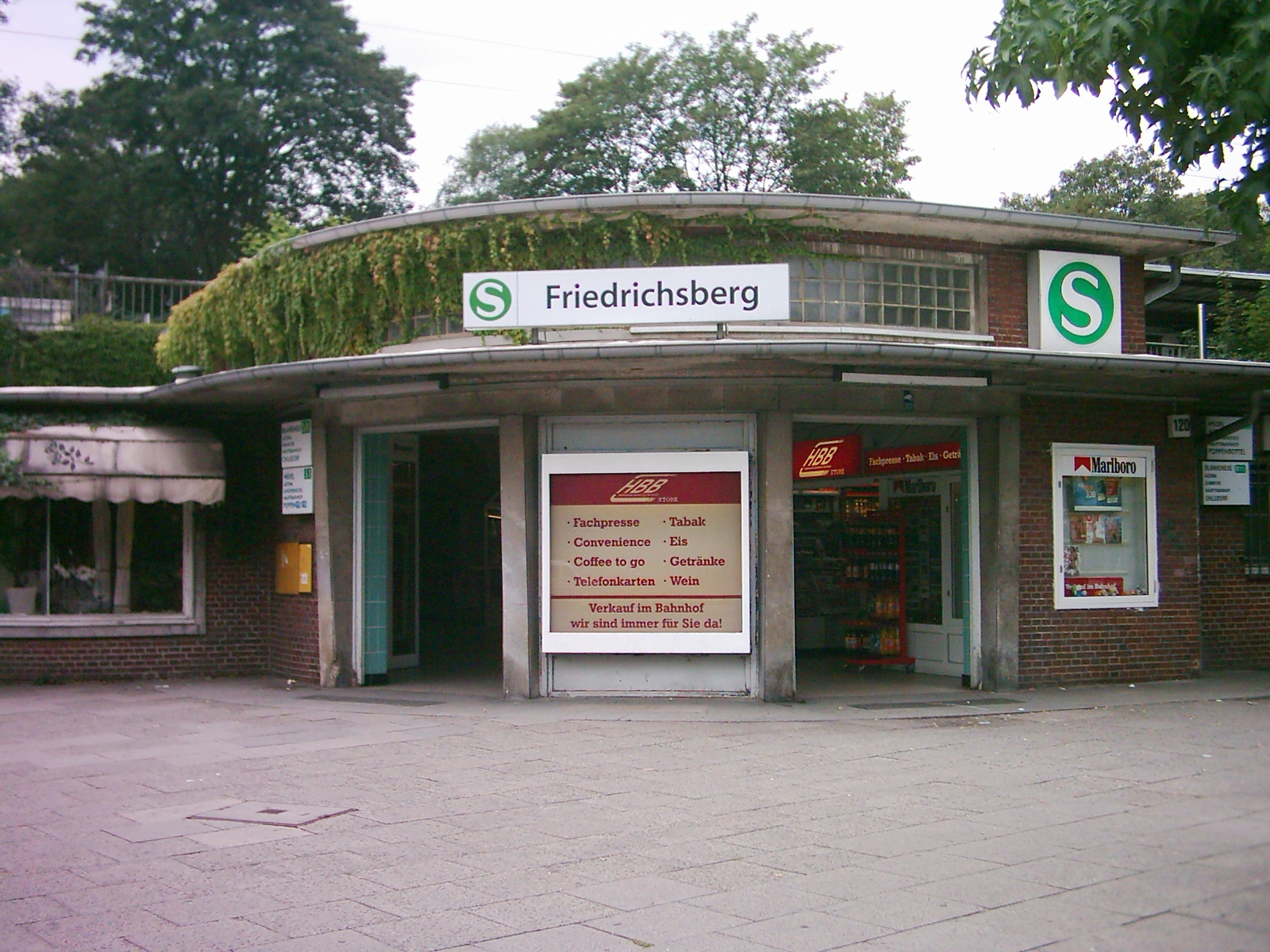
"Friedrichsberg" S-Bahn station

"Friedrichsberg" S-Bahn (Suburban Commuter Railway) station in Hamburg-Dulsberg. This station was originally opened in 1906.

The underground railway was extended in 1962/63 from "Wandsbek-Markt" to "Wandsbek-Gartenstadt" meeting the stations "Alter Teichweg" and "Straßburger Straße" in the neighbourhood.
