= Alter Teichweg station =

Railway station in Hamburg, Germany

Alter Teichweg
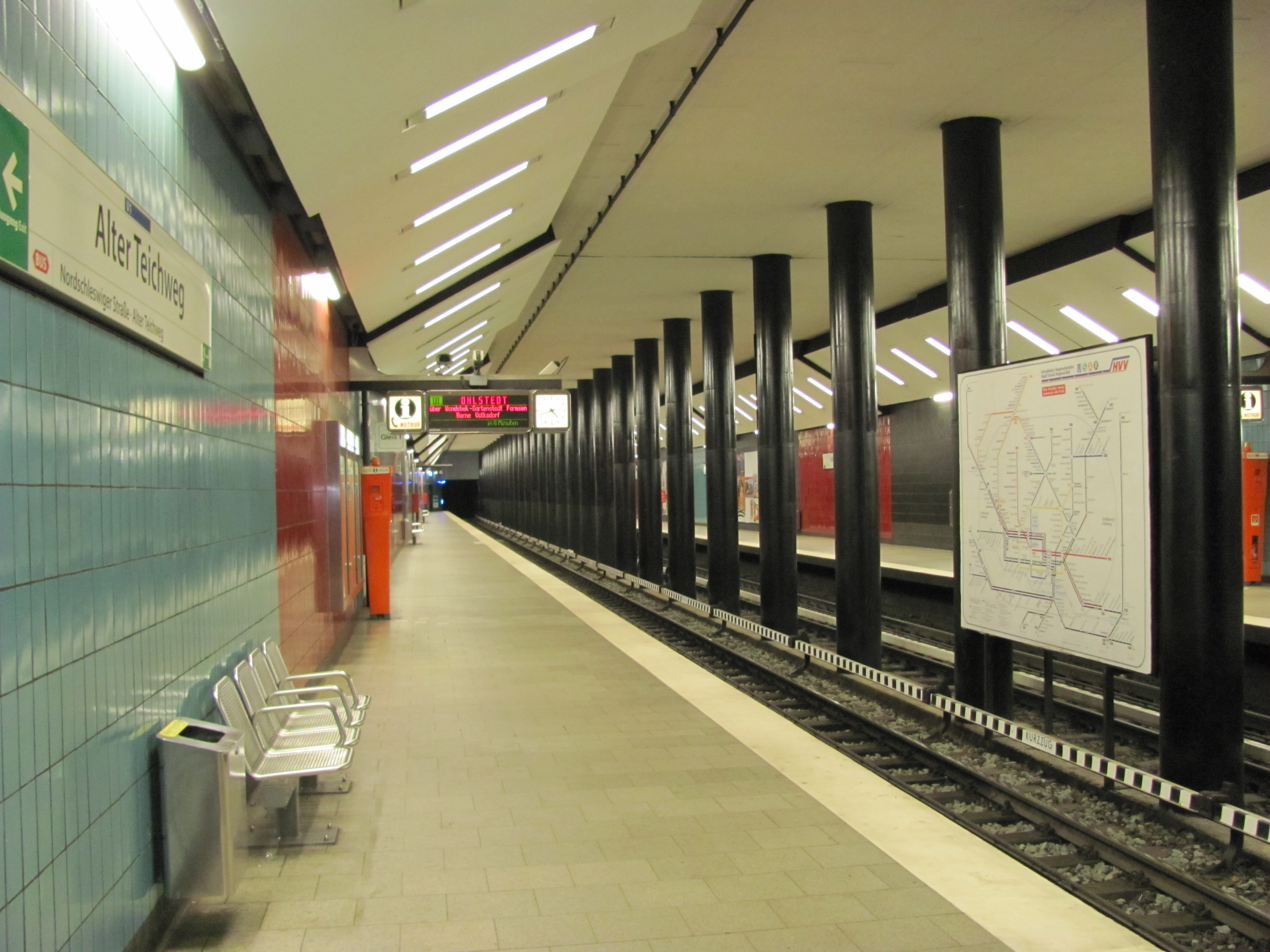

General information
- Location: Nordschleswiger Straße; 22049 Hamburg, Germany
- Coordinates: 53°35′12″N 10°03′52″E
- System: Hamburg U-Bahn station
- Operator: Hamburger Hochbahn AG
- Line: U1
- Platforms: 2 side platforms
- Tracks: 2

Construction
- Structure type: Underground
- Accessible: Yes

Other information
- Station code: HHA: AT
- Fare zone: HVV: A/105 and 205

History
- Opened: 4 August 1963

Services
Preceding station	Hamburg U-Bahn	Following station
Straßburger Straße towards Norderstedt Mitte	U1	Wandsbek-Gartenstadt towards Großhansdorf or Ohlstedt
Location
- Location within Hamburg Location within Germany

Alter Teichweg is an underground rapid transit station located in the Hamburg district of Dulsberg, Germany. The station was opened in 1963 and is served by Hamburg U-Bahn line U1.

== Station layout ==
The station has two 120 meters (394 ft.) long side platforms. The only exit of the station is at the northern end of the station, located in the intersection between Alter Teichweg and Nordschleswiger Straße. There is an emergency exit at the southern end.

== Service ==
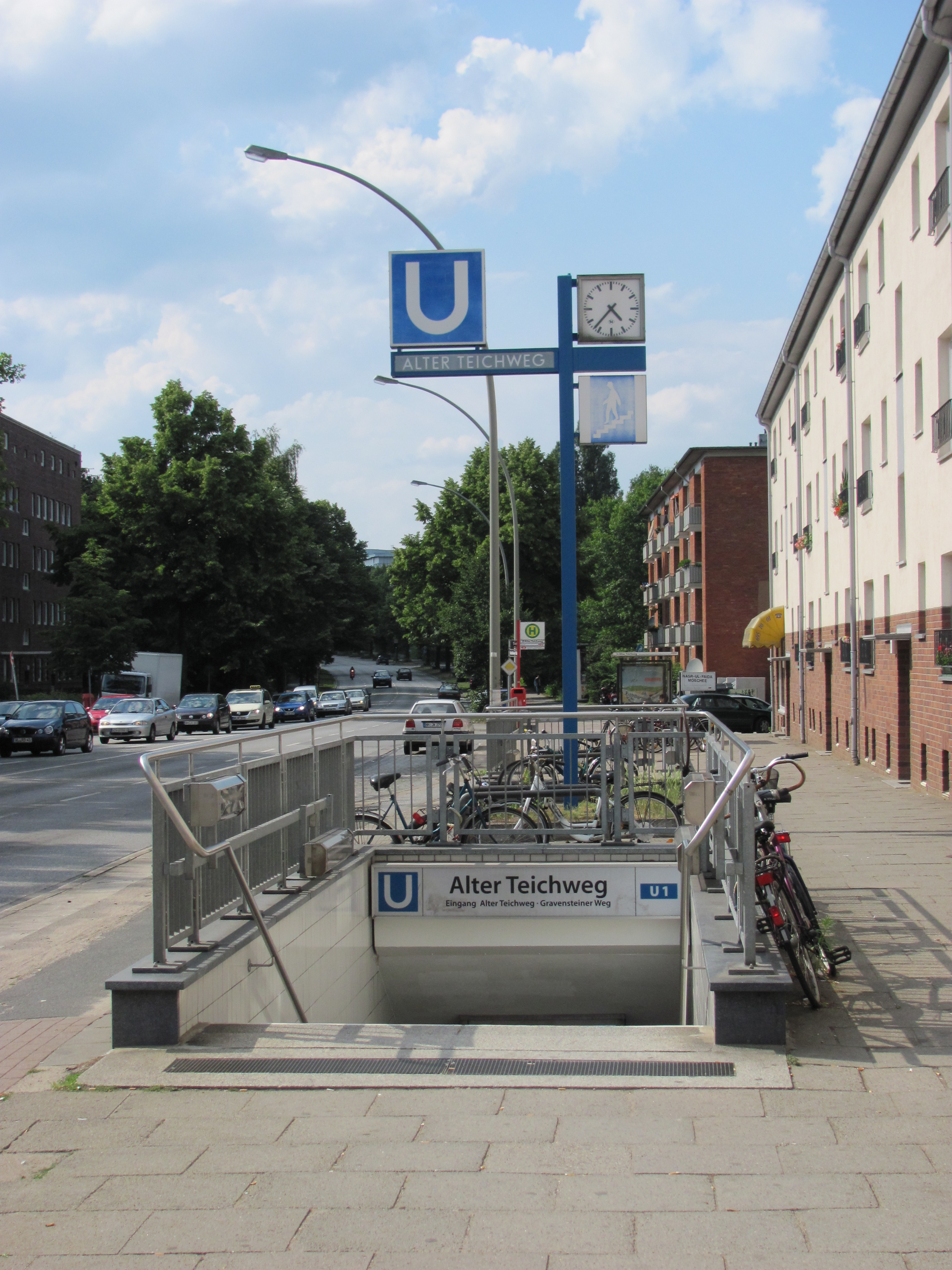
One of the station's entrances

=== Trains ===
Alter Teichweg is served by Hamburg U-Bahn line U1. Departures are every 5 minutes from Monday through Friday with additional trains during the peak-hours. On weekends, departures are every 10 minutes. The travel time to Hamburg Hauptbahnhof is about 13 minutes.

=== Connections ===
Bus lines 23 (from Lufthansa Basis to Billstedt, every 10 minutes) and 28 (from Niendorf Markt to Wandsbek Markt; every 10 minutes) stop above the station.

== See also ==
- List of Hamburg U-Bahn stations
