= Friedrichsberg station =

Railway station in Hamburg, Germany

Friedrichsberg
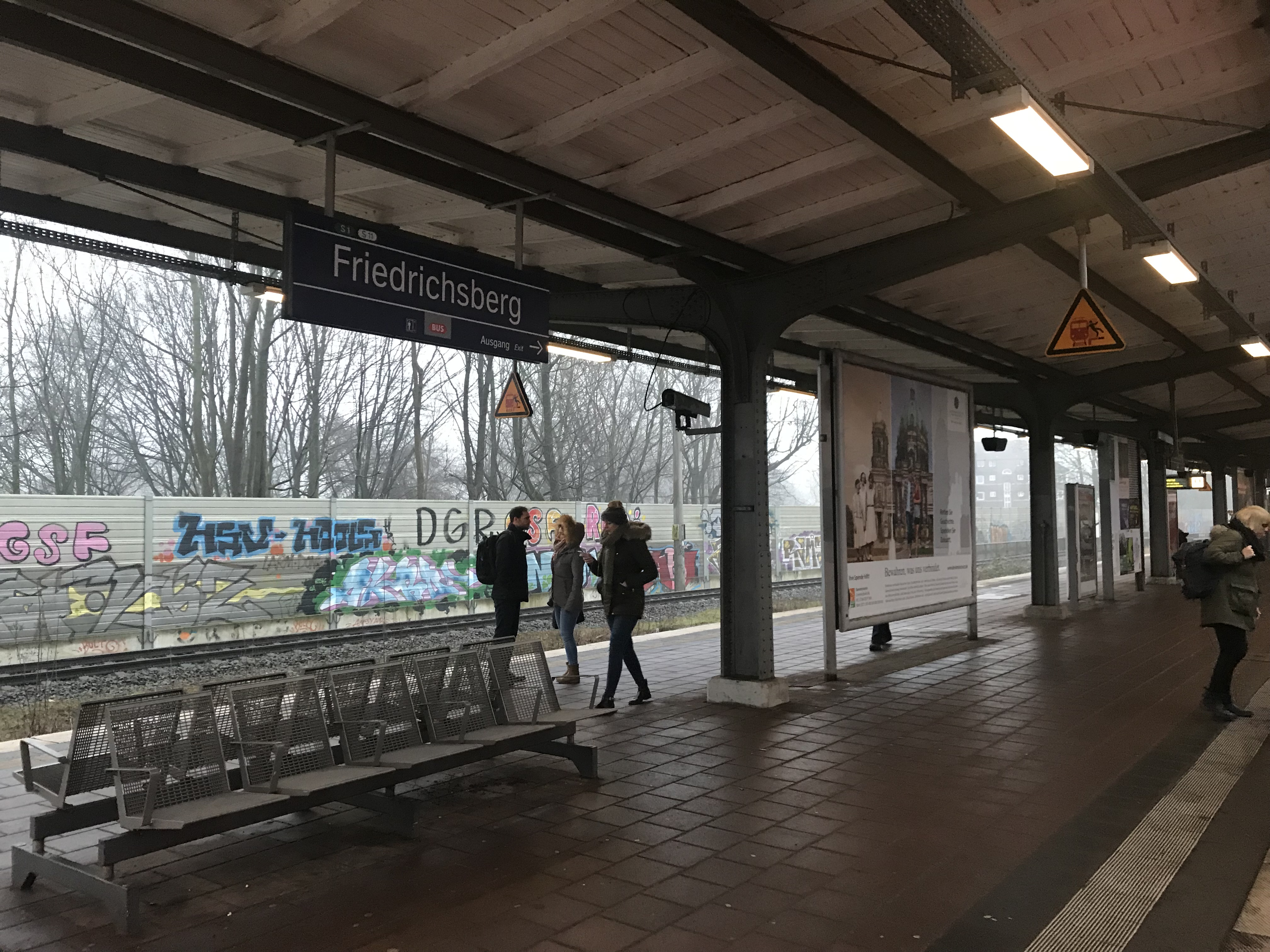
- Platform at Friedrichsberg station

General information
- Location: Krausestraße 118; 22049 Hamburg, Germany
- Coordinates: 53°34′35″N 10°03′27″E
- Operator: S-Bahn Hamburg GmbH
- Line: S1
- Platforms: 1 island platform
- Tracks: 2
- Connections: Bus

Construction
- Structure type: Elevated
- Parking: Park and Ride (93 slots)

Other information
- Station code: ds100: AFBG; DB: 1941
- Fare zone: HVV: A/105

History
- Opened: 5 December 1906; 119 years ago
- Electrified: 29 January 1908; 118 years ago, 6.3 kV AC system (overhead; turned off in 1955); 10 April 1941; 85 years ago, 1.2 kV DC system (3rd rail)

Services
Preceding station	Hamburg S-Bahn	Following station
Wandsbeker Chaussee towards Wedel	S1	Barmbek towards Poppenbüttel or Hamburg Airport
Location
- Location within Hamburg Location within Schleswig-Holstein Location within Germany Location within Europe

Friedrichsberg is a station on the Hamburg-Altona link line and served by the trains of Hamburg S-Bahn line S1. The station was originally opened in 1906 and is located in the Hamburg district of Dulsberg, Germany. Dulsberg is part of the borough of Hamburg-Nord.

== History ==
The station was opened in 1906, and electrified a year later.

== Service ==
The line S1 of Hamburg S-Bahn call at Friedrichsberg station.

The Station contains a Bakery a Kiosk and a Döner/Kebap Store.

== Gallery ==
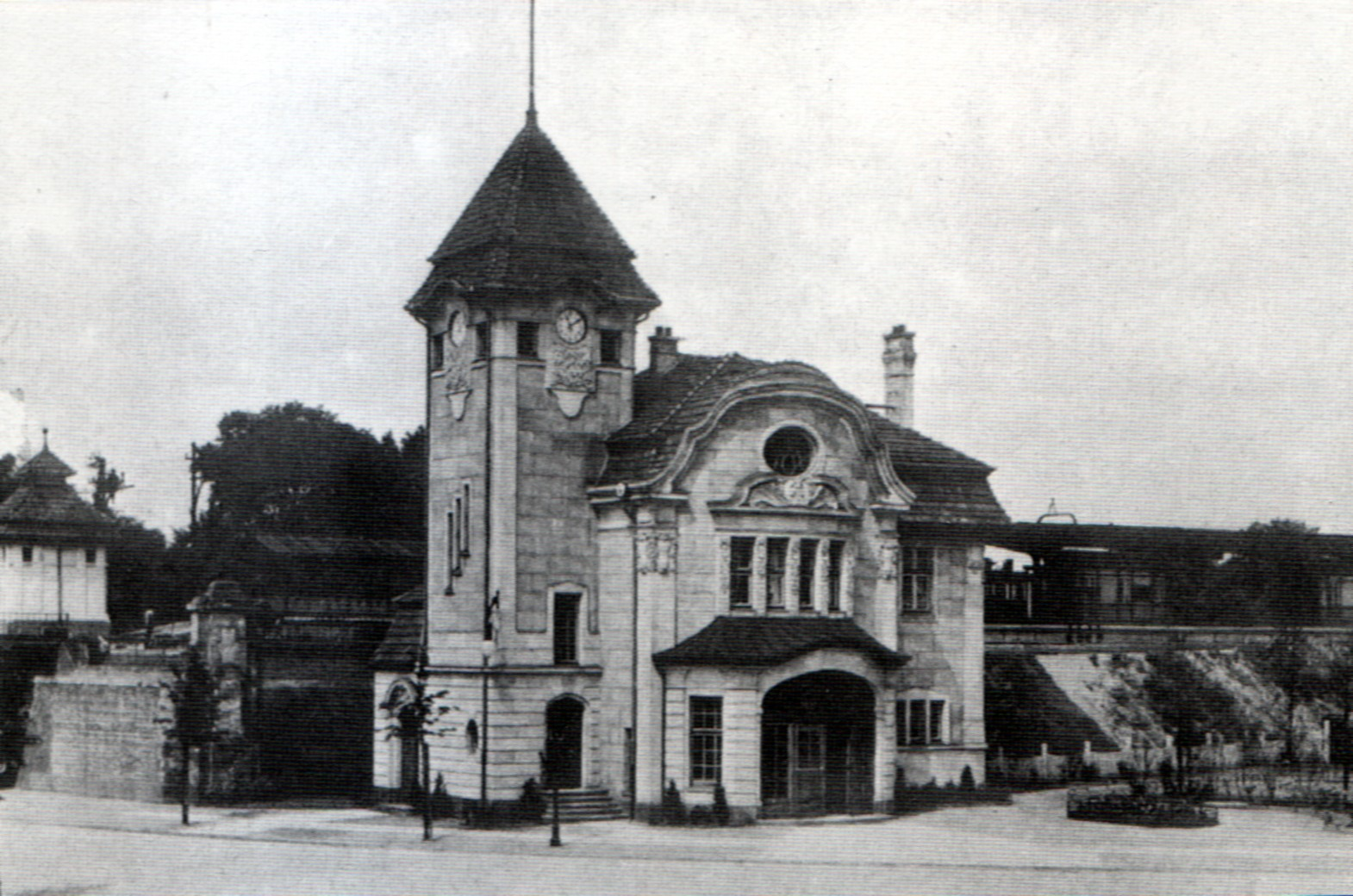
Friedrichsberg station in 1906

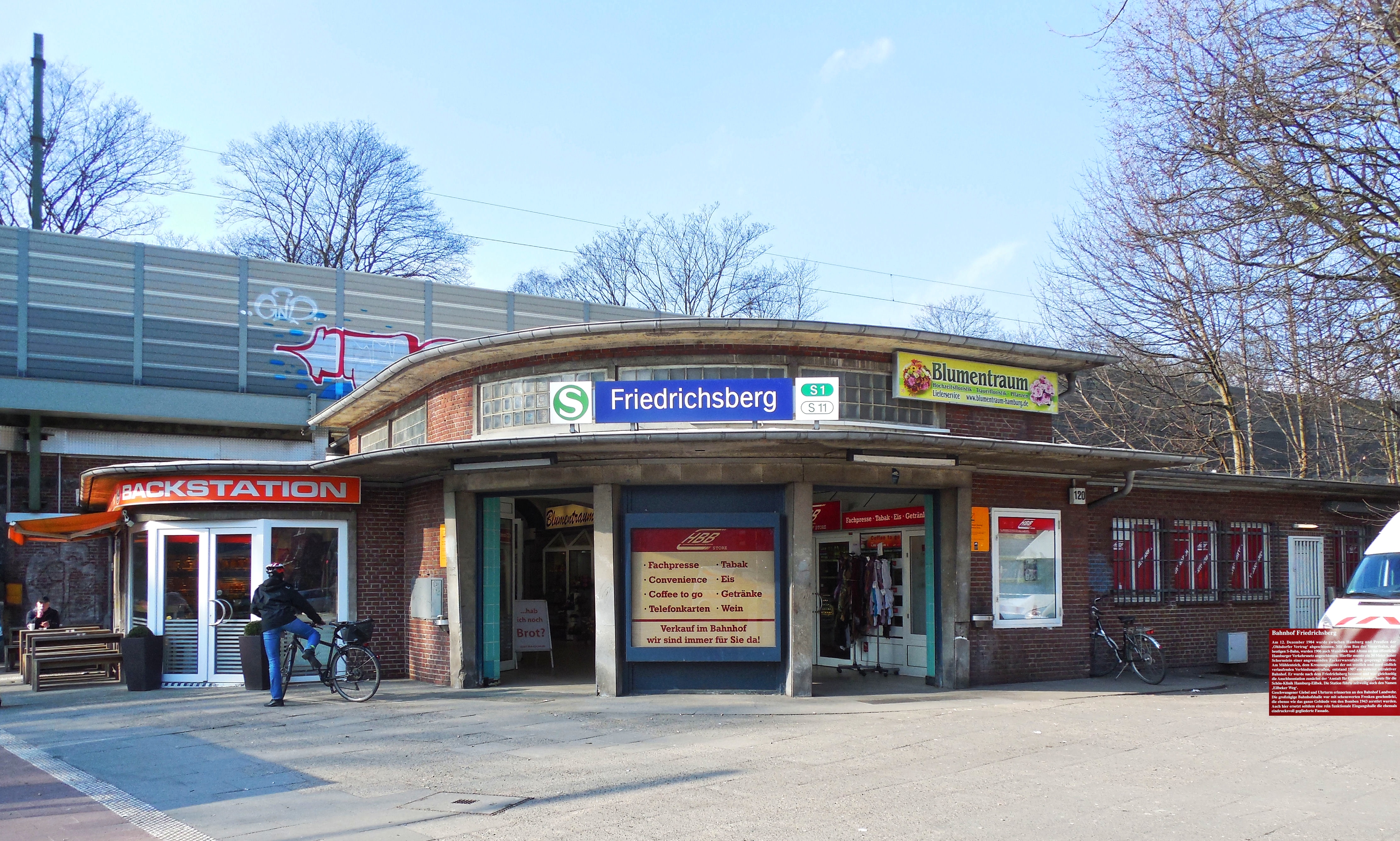
The station's entrance

== See also ==
- Hamburger Verkehrsverbund (HVV)
- List of Hamburg S-Bahn stations
