= Straßburger Straße station =

Underground rapid transit station in Germany

Straßburger Straße
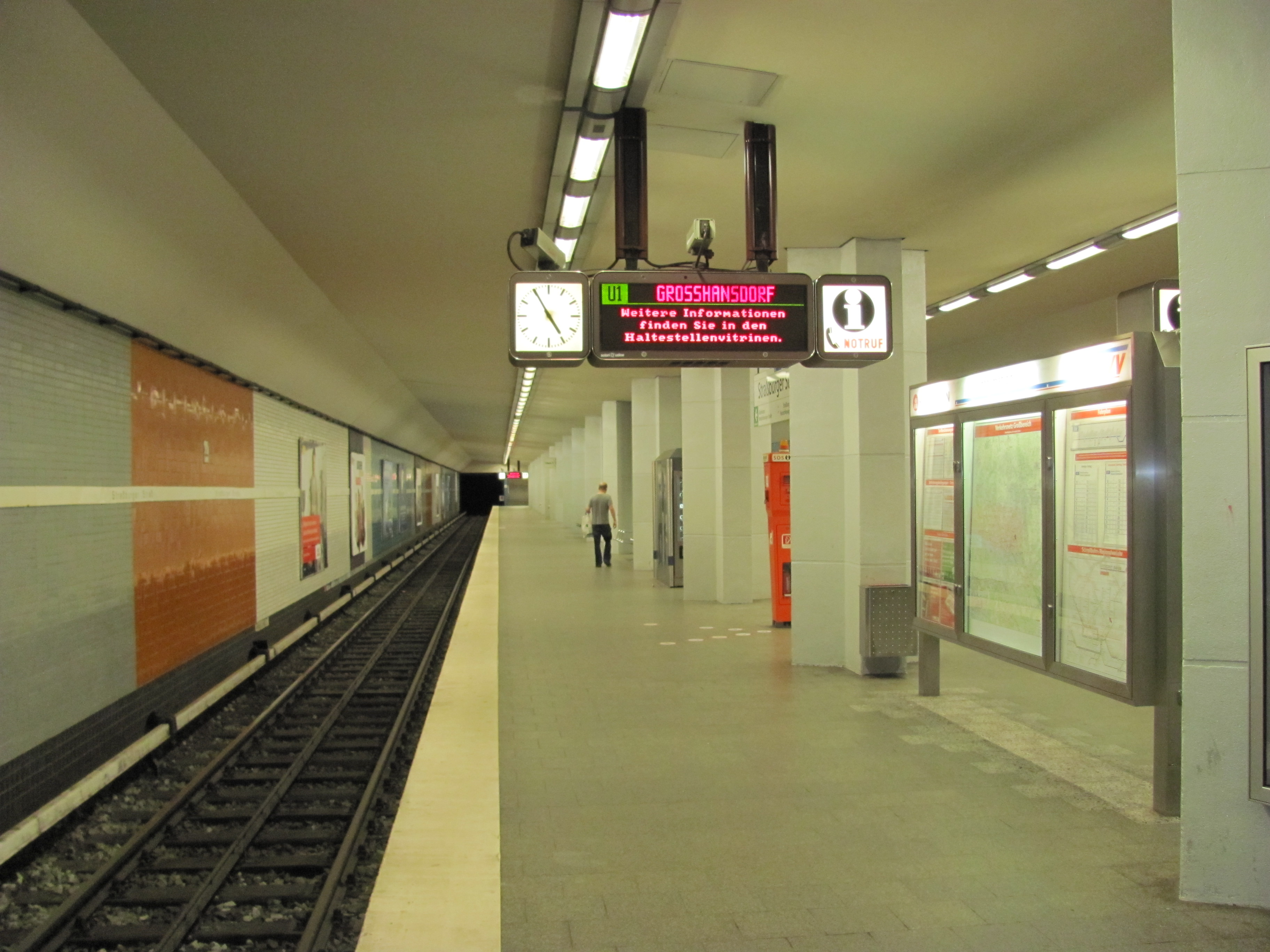

General information
- Location: Nordschleswiger Straße; 22049 Hamburg, Germany
- Coordinates: 53°34′56″N 10°04′03″E
- System: Hamburg U-Bahn station
- Operator: Hamburger Hochbahn AG
- Line: U1
- Platforms: 1 island platform
- Tracks: 2

Construction
- Structure type: Underground
- Accessible: Yes

Other information
- Station code: HHA: SR
- Fare zone: HVV: A/105 and 205

History
- Opened: 3 March 1963; 63 years ago

Services
Preceding station	Hamburg U-Bahn	Following station
Wandsbek Markt towards Norderstedt Mitte	U1	Alter Teichweg towards Großhansdorf or Ohlstedt
Location
- Location within Hamburg Location within Germany

Straßburger Straße is an underground rapid transit station located in the Hamburg district of Dulsberg, Germany. The station was opened in 1963 and is served by Hamburg U-Bahn line U1.

== Service ==
=== Trains ===
Straßburger Straße is served by Hamburg U-Bahn line U1; departures are every 5 minutes. The travel time to Hamburg Hauptbahnhof is about 13 minutes.

== Gallery ==
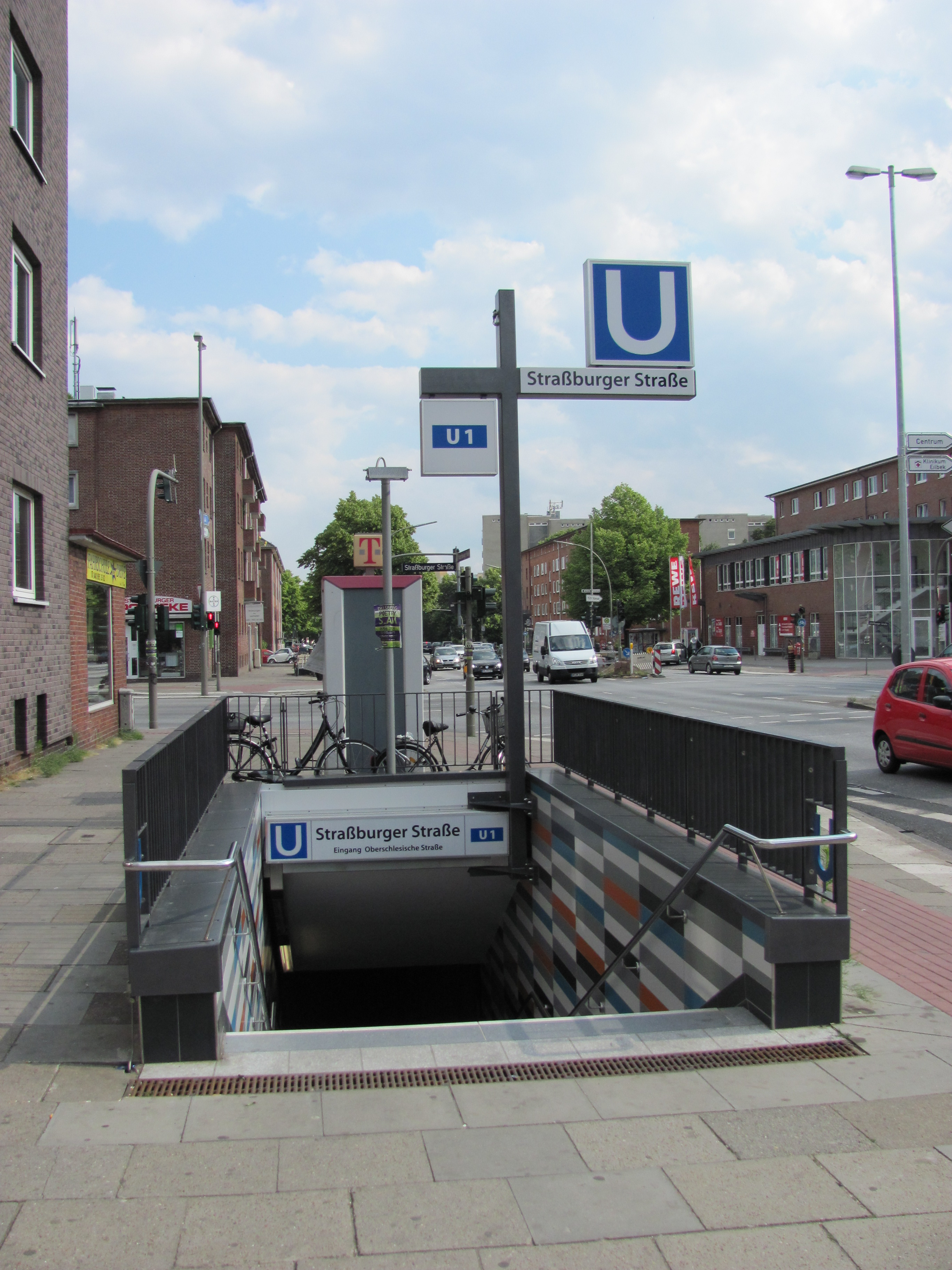
One of the station's entrances

== See also ==
- List of Hamburg U-Bahn stations
