= Ritterstraße station =

Railway station in Hamburg, Germany

Ritterstraße
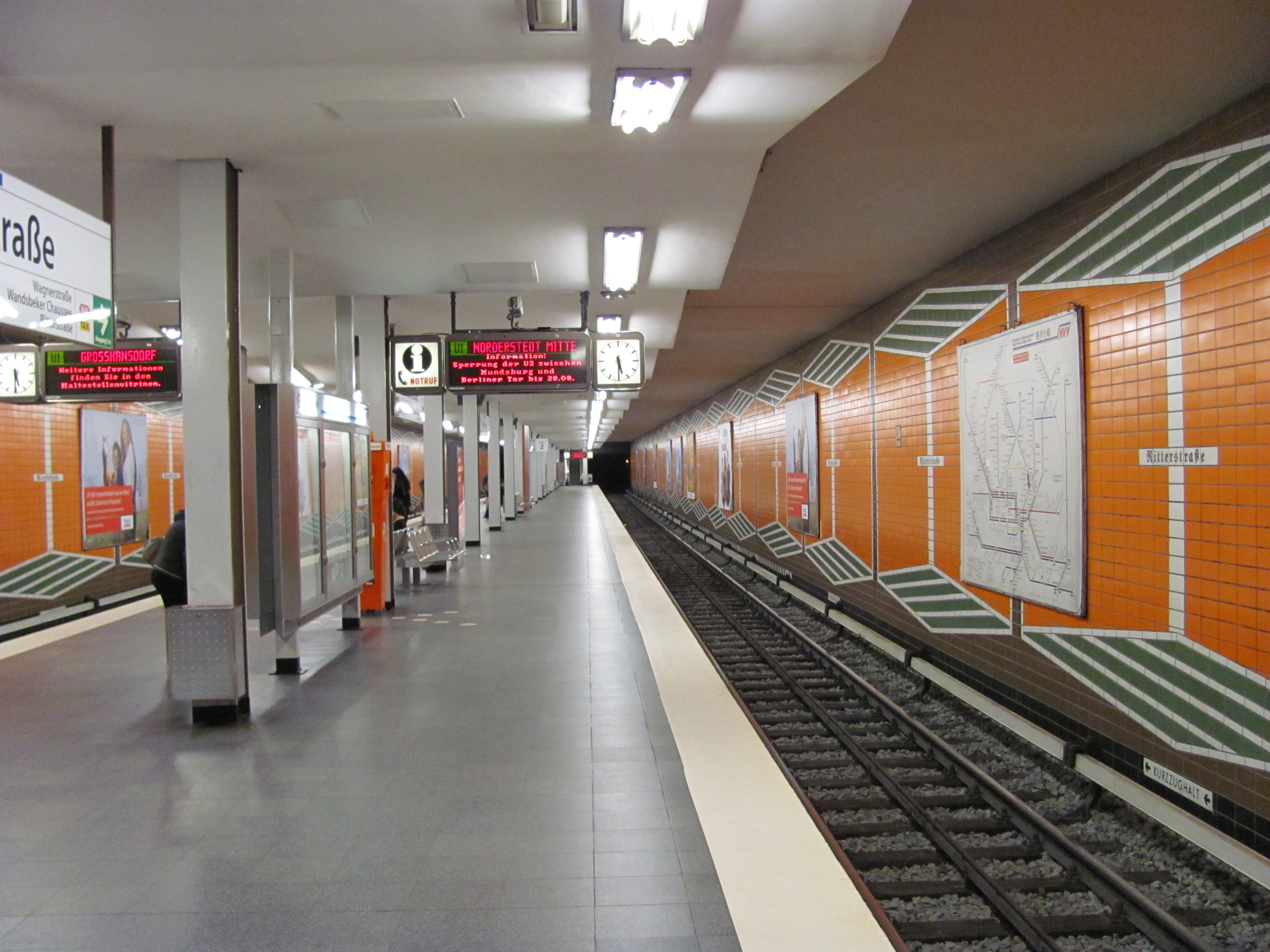

General information
- Location: Wandsbeker Chaussee; 22089 Hamburg, Germany
- Coordinates: 53°34′02″N 10°02′41″E
- System: Hamburg U-Bahn station
- Operator: Hamburger Hochbahn AG
- Line: U1
- Platforms: 1 island platform
- Tracks: 2

Construction
- Structure type: Underground
- Accessible: Yes

Other information
- Station code: HHA: RI
- Fare zone: HVV: A/105

History
- Opened: 28 October 1962

Services
Preceding station	Hamburg U-Bahn	Following station
Wartenau towards Norderstedt Mitte	U1	Wandsbeker Chaussee towards Großhansdorf or Ohlstedt
Location
- Location within Hamburg Location within Germany

Ritterstraße is a through station on the Hamburg U-Bahn line U1. The station was opened in October 1962 and is located in the Hamburg district of Eilbek, Germany. Eilbek is part of the Hamburg borough of Wandsbek.

== Service ==
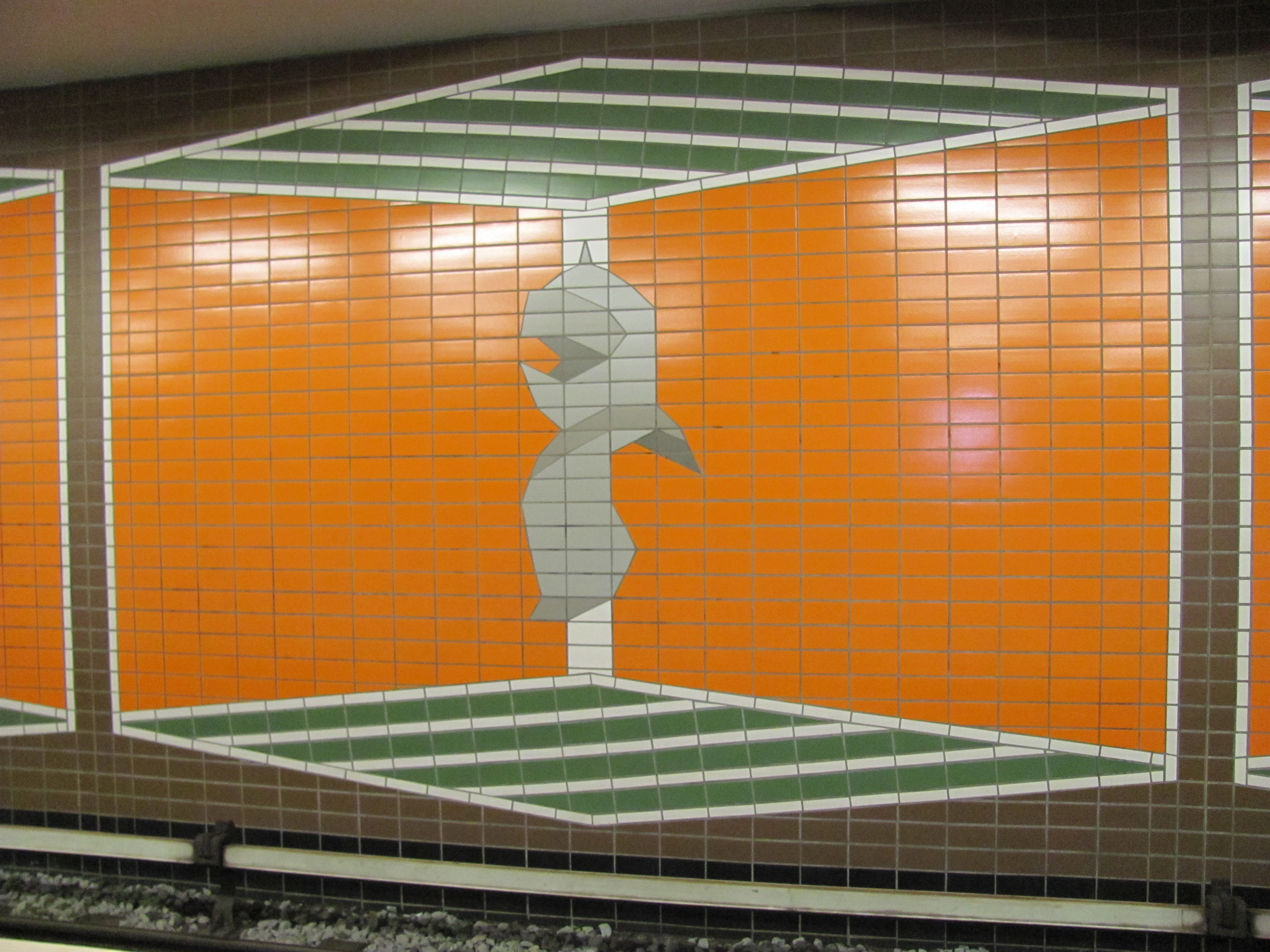
Wall tiles

=== Trains ===
Ritterstraße is served by Hamburg U-Bahn line U1; departures are every 5 minutes.

== See also ==
- List of Hamburg U-Bahn stations
