= Meßberg station =

Underground station in Hamburg, Germany

Meßberg
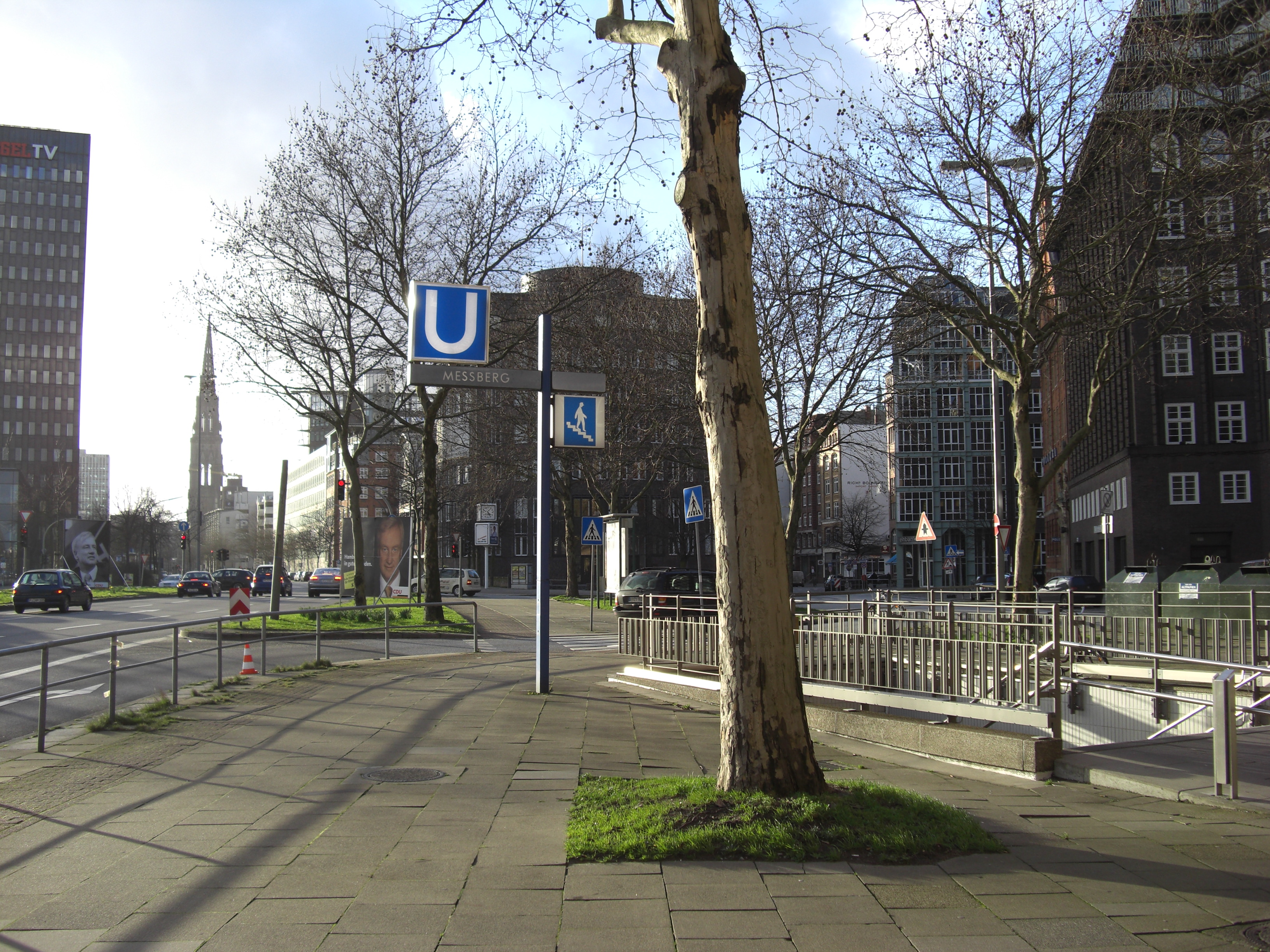
- Entrance to the underground station Messberg

General information
- Coordinates: 53°32′52″N 9°59′59″E
- System: Rapid transit
- Lines: Hamburg U-Bahn; U1
- Platforms: 1 island platform
- Tracks: 2

Construction
- Structure type: Underground
- Platform levels: 2

Other information
- Fare zone: HVV: A/000

History
- Opened: February 1960
- Electrified: 750 volts DC system Bottom-contact third rail

Services
Preceding station	Hamburg U-Bahn	Following station
Jungfernstieg towards Norderstedt Mitte	U1	Steinstraße towards Großhansdorf or Ohlstedt
Location
- Location within Hamburg Location within Schleswig-Holstein Location within Germany Location within Europe

The underground station Meßberg is located in the city centre of Hamburg, Germany in the Altstadt quarter. It is served by the rapid transit trains of the line U1 of the Hamburg U-Bahn. The station is managed by the Hamburger Hochbahn, the operator of the underground railway.

== History ==
In March 1894, the first electric tram line in Hamburg served an at grade stop Meßberg. On 22 February 1960, the construction of the 0.7 km long tunnel-line from Jungfernstieg station to the new underground station Meßberg was finished, it was the first new construction of an underground rail line in Hamburg after 24 years. On 2 October 1960 the tunnel to the newly built underground station “Central Station” was completed.

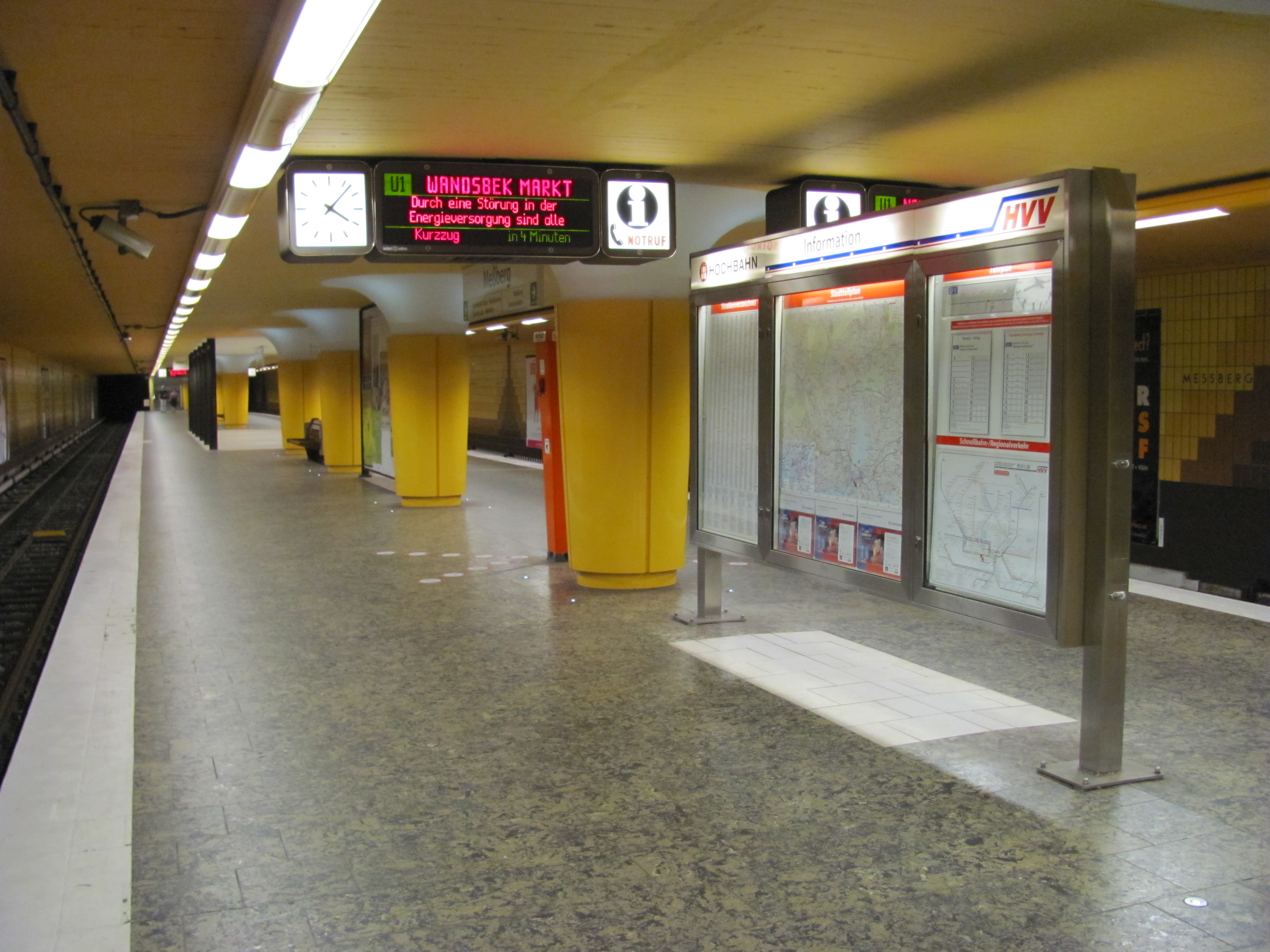
Meßberg station

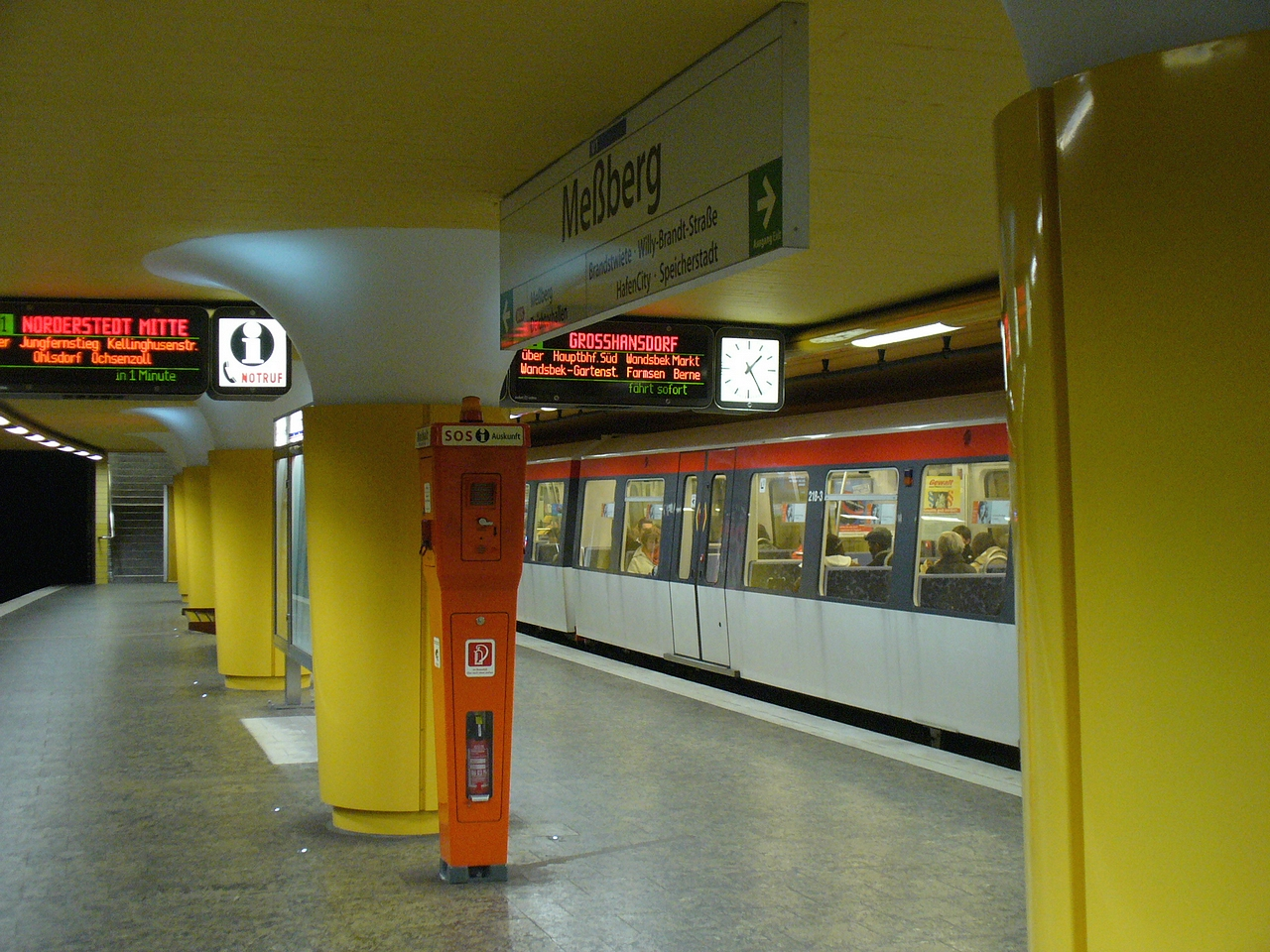
Meßberg station

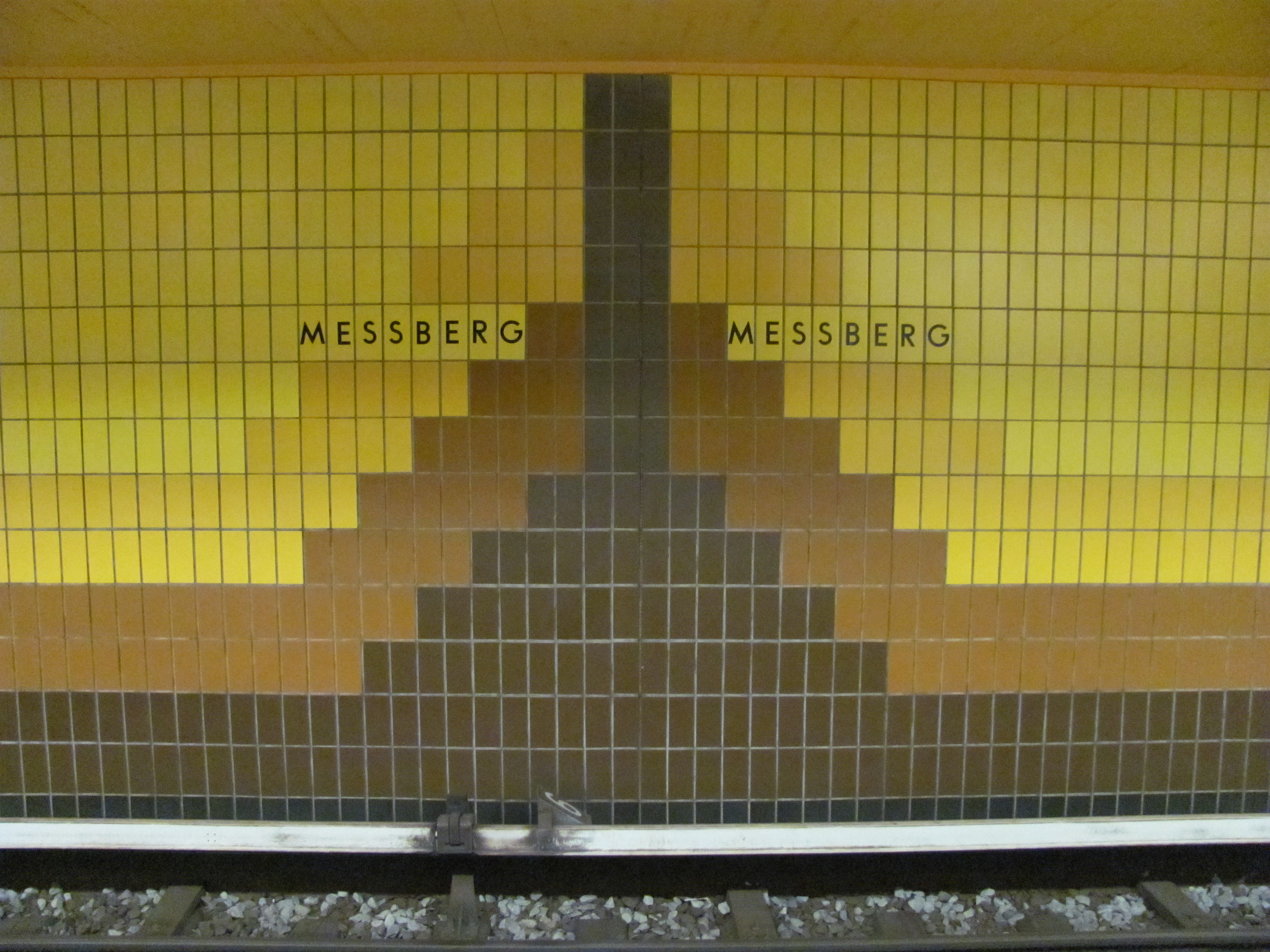
Wall of Meßberg station

== Service ==
The trains of the line U1 from Norderstedt to Ohlstedt / Großhansdorf are calling the station.

== See also ==
- Hamburger Verkehrsverbund (Public transport association in Hamburg)
