= Lübecker Straße station =

Railway station in Hamburg, Germany

Lübecker Straße
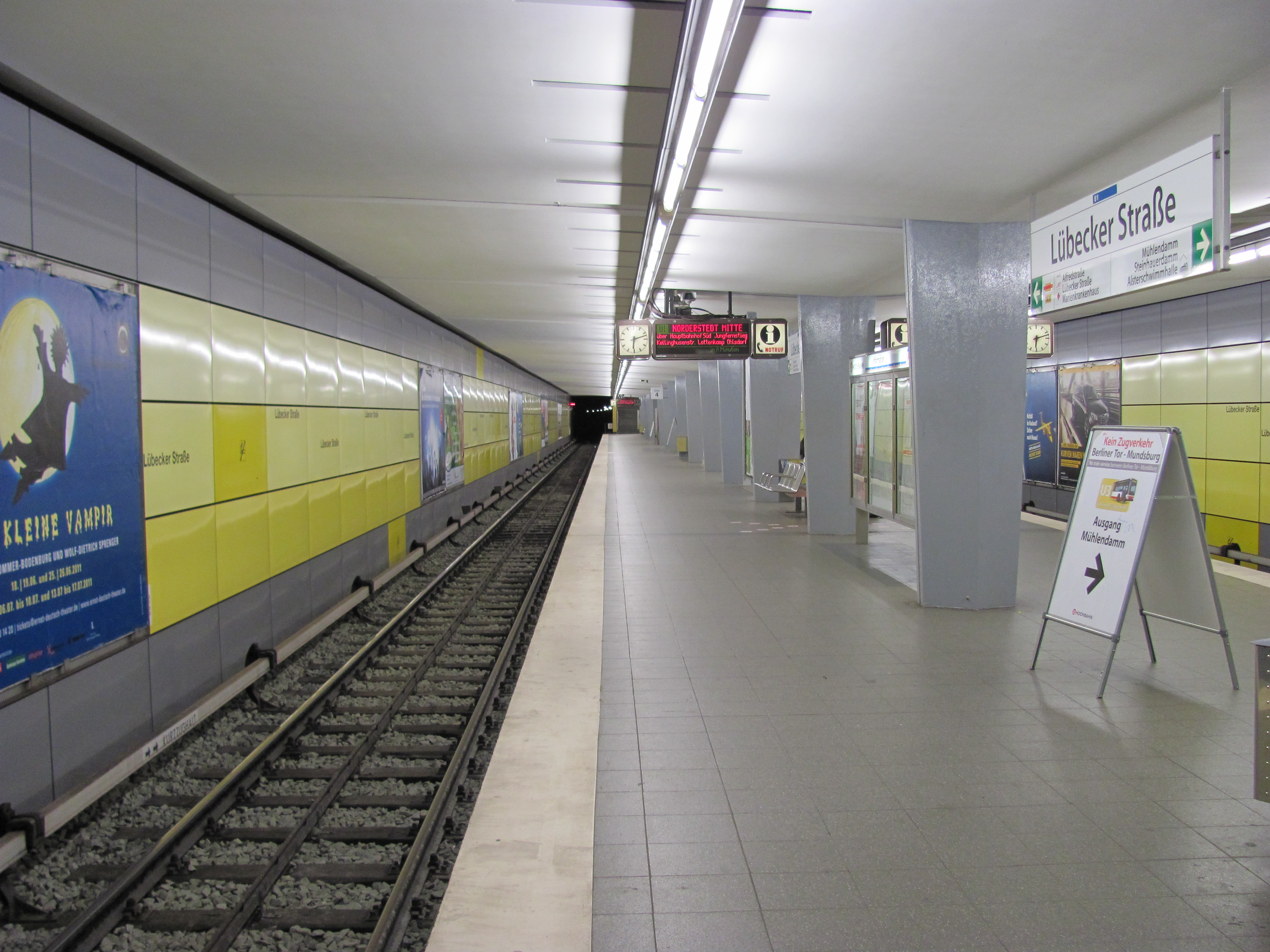

General information
- Location: Lübecker Straße; 22087 Hamburg, Germany
- Coordinates: 53°33′35″N 10°01′41″E
- System: Hamburg U-Bahn station
- Operator: Hamburger Hochbahn AG
- Platforms: 2 island platforms
- Tracks: 4 side tracks

Construction
- Structure type: Underground
- Platform levels: 3
- Accessible: Yes

Other information
- Fare zone: HVV: A/000 and 105

History
- Opened: 1 March 1912; 114 years ago
- Rebuilt: 1958-1960
- Electrified: at opening

Services
Preceding station	Hamburg U-Bahn	Following station
Lohmühlenstraße towards Norderstedt Mitte	U1	Wartenau towards Großhansdorf or Ohlstedt
Berliner Tor towards Barmbek	U3	Uhlandstraße towards Wandsbek-Gartenstadt
Location
- Location within Hamburg Location within Schleswig-Holstein Location within Germany Location within Europe

Lübecker Straße is a metro station located in Hohenfelde, Hamburg, Germany. It was built and first opened on 1 March 1912, originally located in a terrain cutting. Between 1958 and 1960 the station was rebuilt into an underground, reopened on 2 July 1961.

== Services ==
Lübecker Straße is served by the Hamburg U-Bahn lines U1 and U3.

== See also ==
- List of Hamburg U-Bahn stations
