= Uhlandstraße station (Hamburg U-Bahn) =

Metro station in Hamburg, Germany

Uhlandstraße
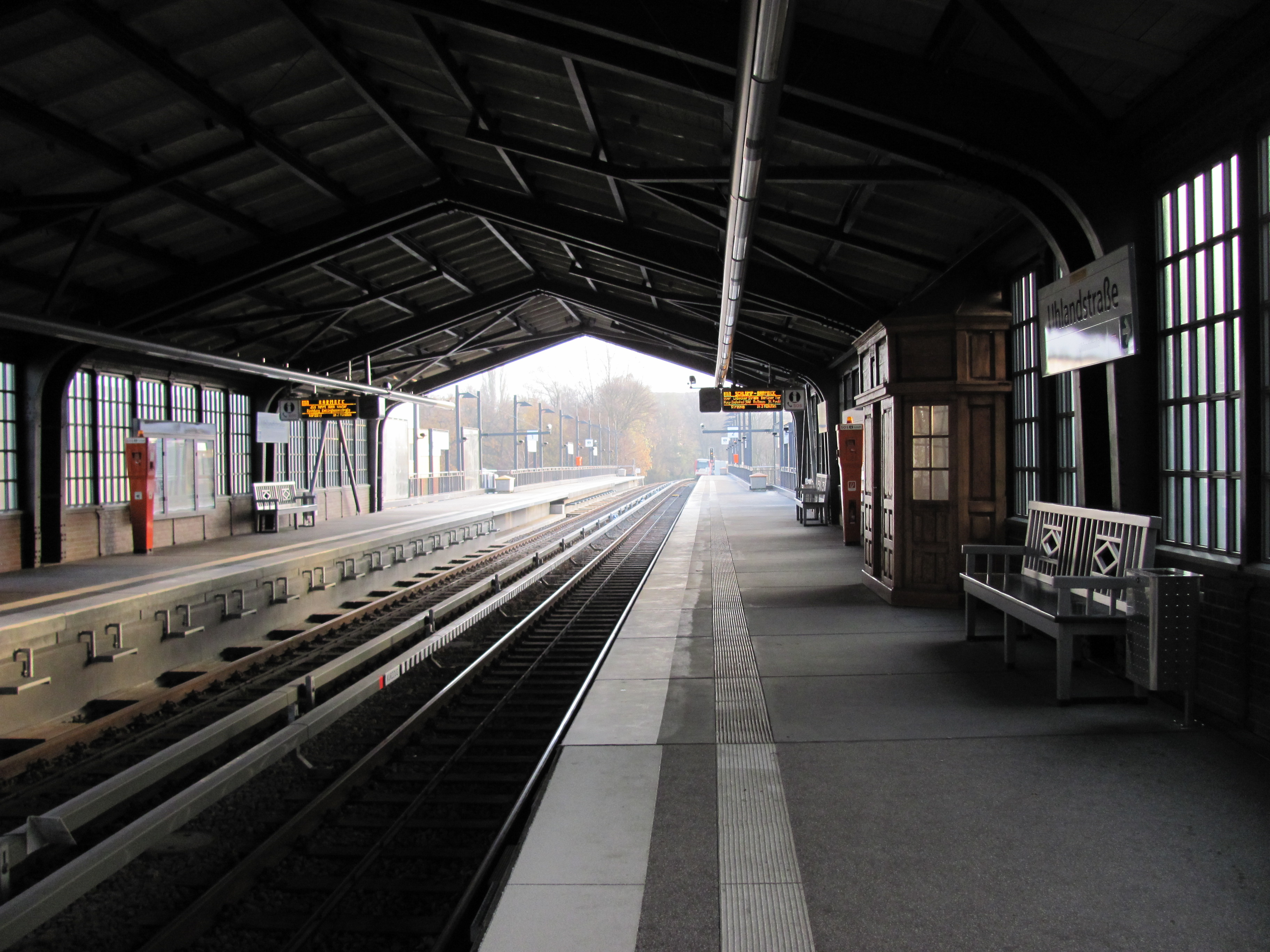

General information
- Location: Uhlandstraße; 22087 Hamburg, Germany
- Coordinates: 53°33′53″N 10°01′36″E
- System: Hamburg U-Bahn station
- Operator: Hamburger Hochbahn AG
- Line: U3
- Platforms: 2 side platforms
- Tracks: 2
- Connections: Bus

Construction
- Structure type: Elevated
- Accessible: Yes

Other information
- Station code: HHA: UH
- Fare zone: HVV: A/000 and 105

History
- Opened: 1 March 1912

Services
Preceding station	Hamburg U-Bahn	Following station
Lübecker Straße towards Barmbek	U3	Mundsburg towards Wandsbek-Gartenstadt
Location
- Location within Hamburg Location within Schleswig-Holstein Location within Germany Location within Europe

Uhlandstraße is a metro station on the Hamburg U-Bahn line U3. The station was built in 1912 and is located in Hamburg's quarter of Hohenfelde, Germany.

== Service ==
Uhlandstraße is served by Hamburg U-Bahn line U3; departures are every 5 minutes.

== Gallery ==
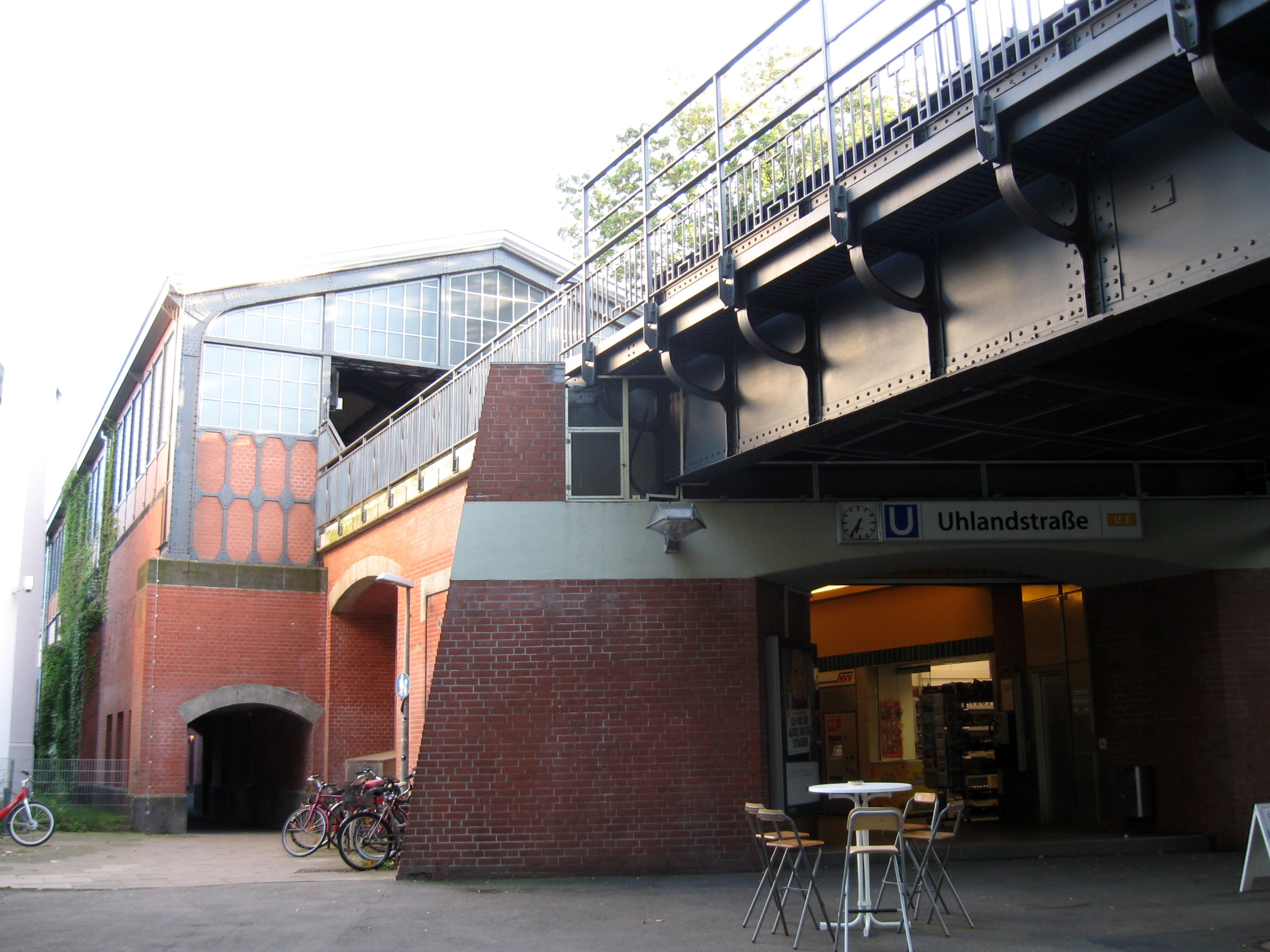

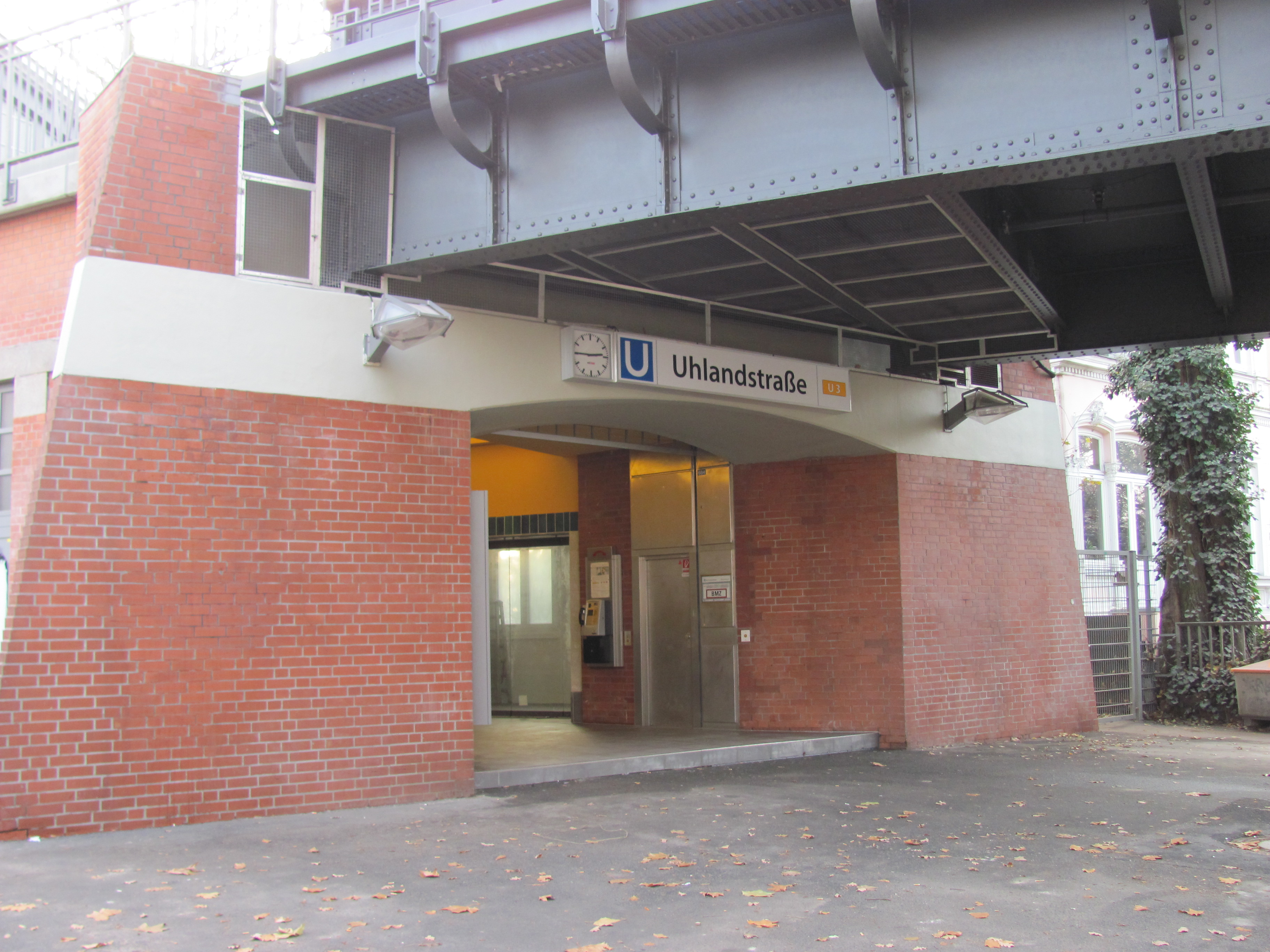

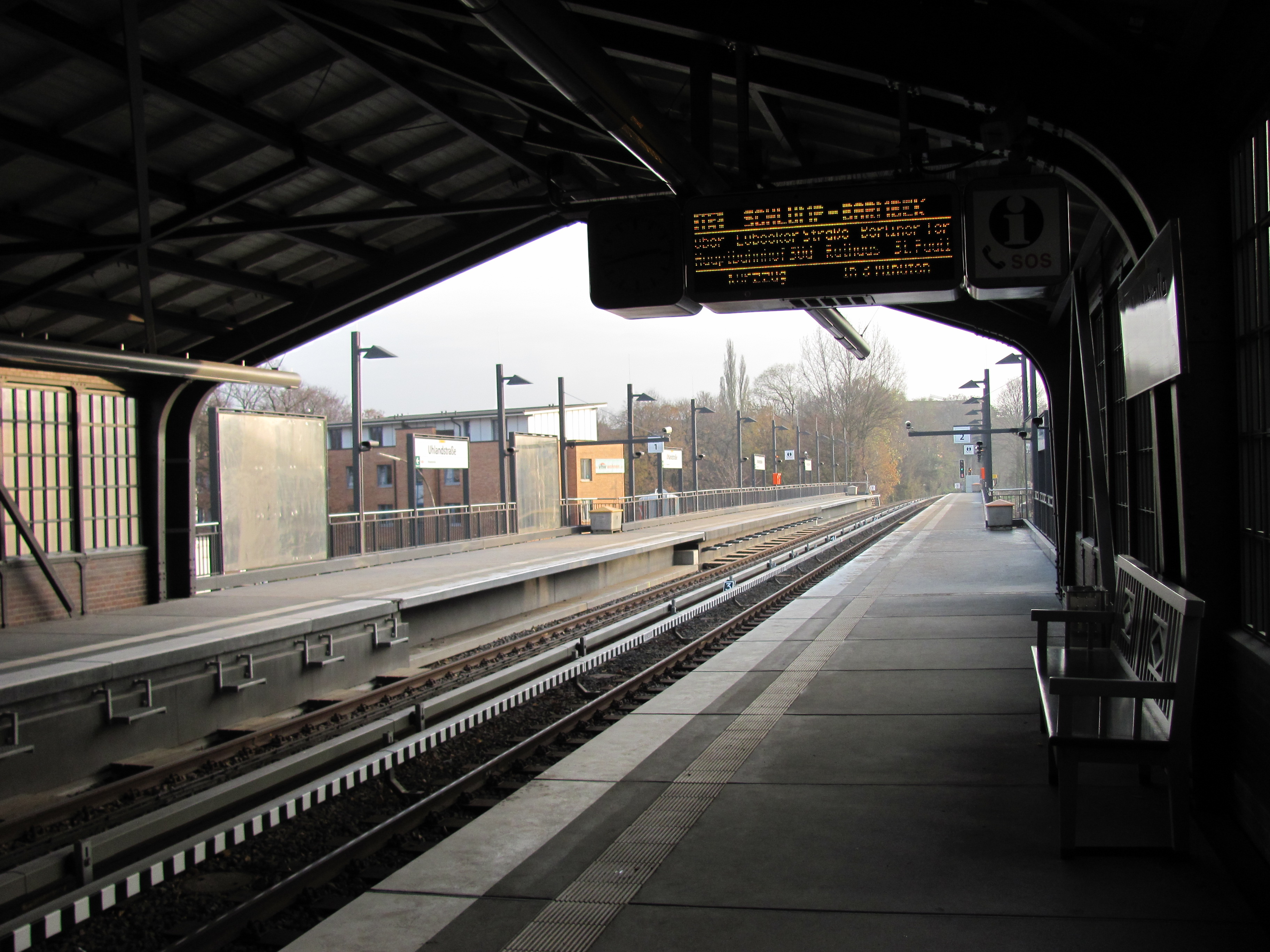

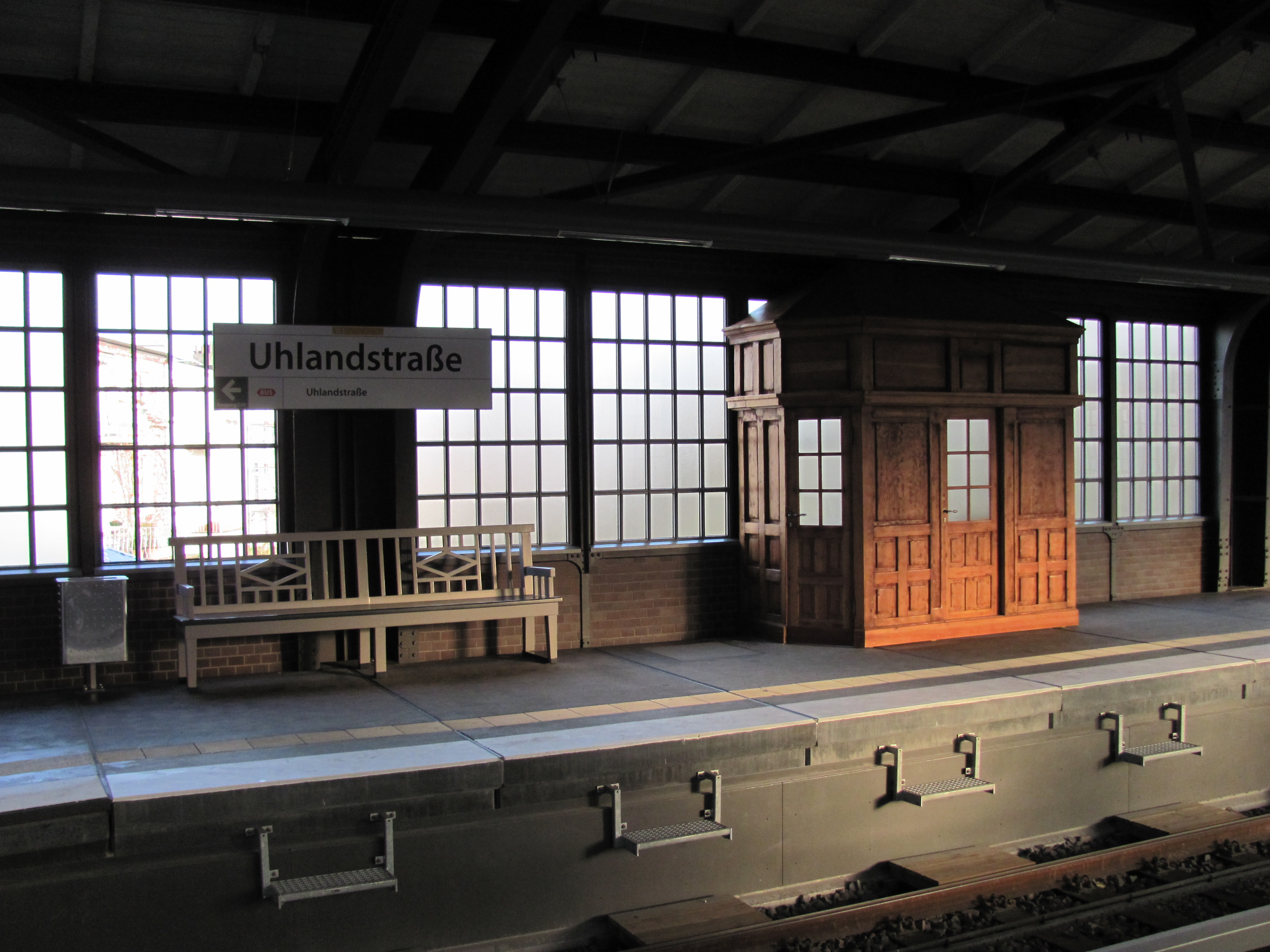

== See also ==
- List of Hamburg U-Bahn stations
