= Steinstraße station =

Metro station in Hamburg, Germany

Steinstraße
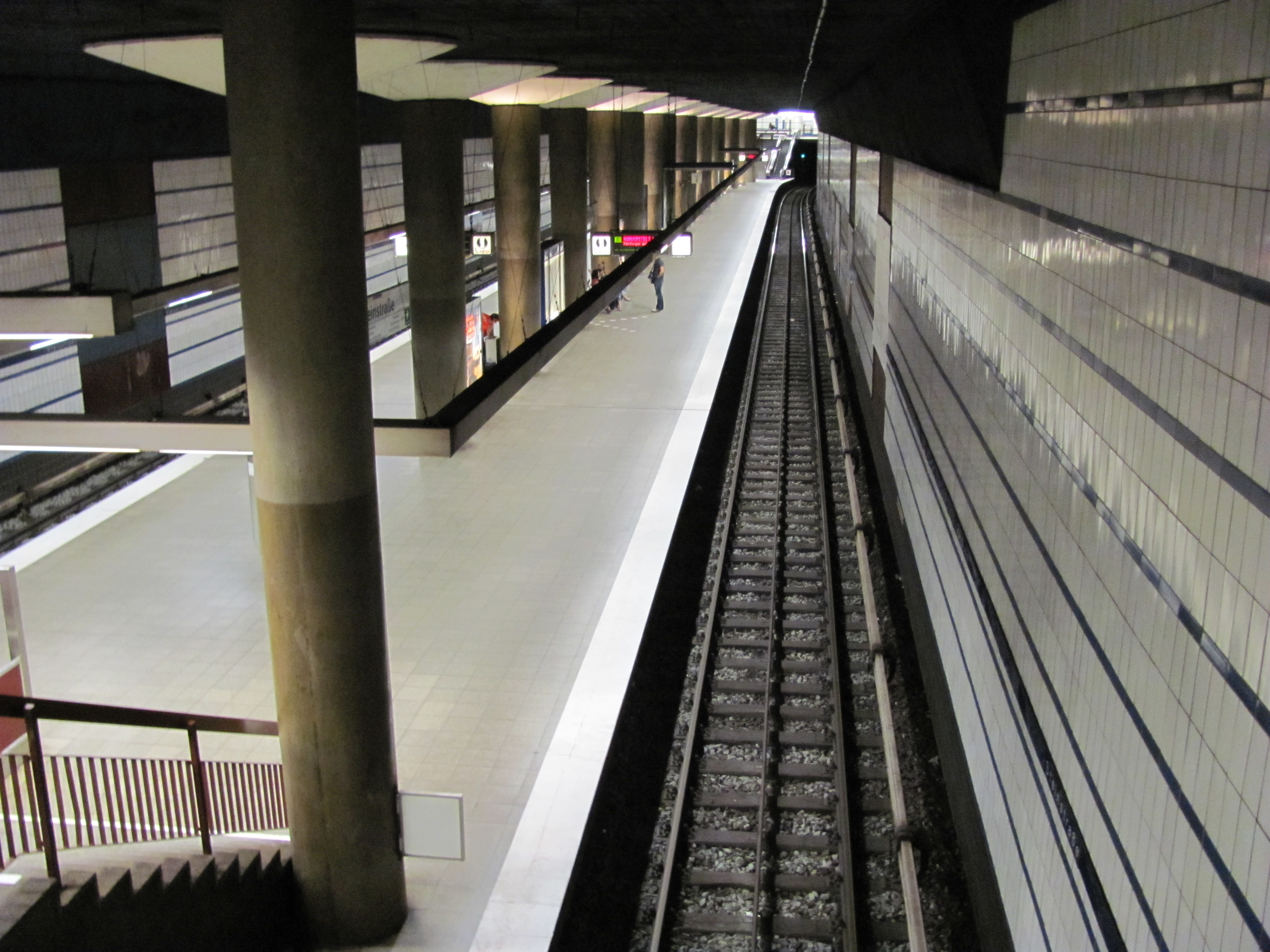

General information
- Location: Deichtorplatz; 20095 Hamburg, Germany
- Coordinates: 53°33′00″N 10°00′21″E
- System: Hamburg U-Bahn station
- Operator: Hamburger Hochbahn AG
- Line: U1
- Platforms: 1 island platform
- Tracks: 2
- Connections: Bus

Construction
- Structure type: Underground
- Accessible: Yes

Other information
- Station code: HHA: ST
- Fare zone: HVV: A/000

History
- Opened: 2 October 1960

Services
| Preceding station | Hamburg U-Bahn | Following station |
|---|---|---|
| Meßberg towards Norderstedt Mitte | U1 | Hauptbahnhof Süd towards Großhansdorf or Ohlstedt |
Location
- Location within Hamburg Location within Schleswig-Holstein Location within Germany Location within Europe

Steinstraße is an underground rapid transit station of the Hamburg U-Bahn U1 line in Hamburg, Germany. It is located at Deichtorplatz, between Steinstraße and Deichtorwall in Hamburg-Altstadt. Roughly 10,700 people frequent it daily.

== History ==
The Steinstraße station (originally planned to be named Altmannbrücke) was opened on October 2, 1960, when the line now known as the U1 was extended from Meßberg to Hauptbahnhof. Until the 1970s, a small kiosk was operated on the platform. Since July 8, 2021, the station has been accessible for wheelchair users.

== Service ==
=== Trains ===
Steinstraße is served by Hamburg U-Bahn line U1; departures are every 5 minutes.

== Gallery ==
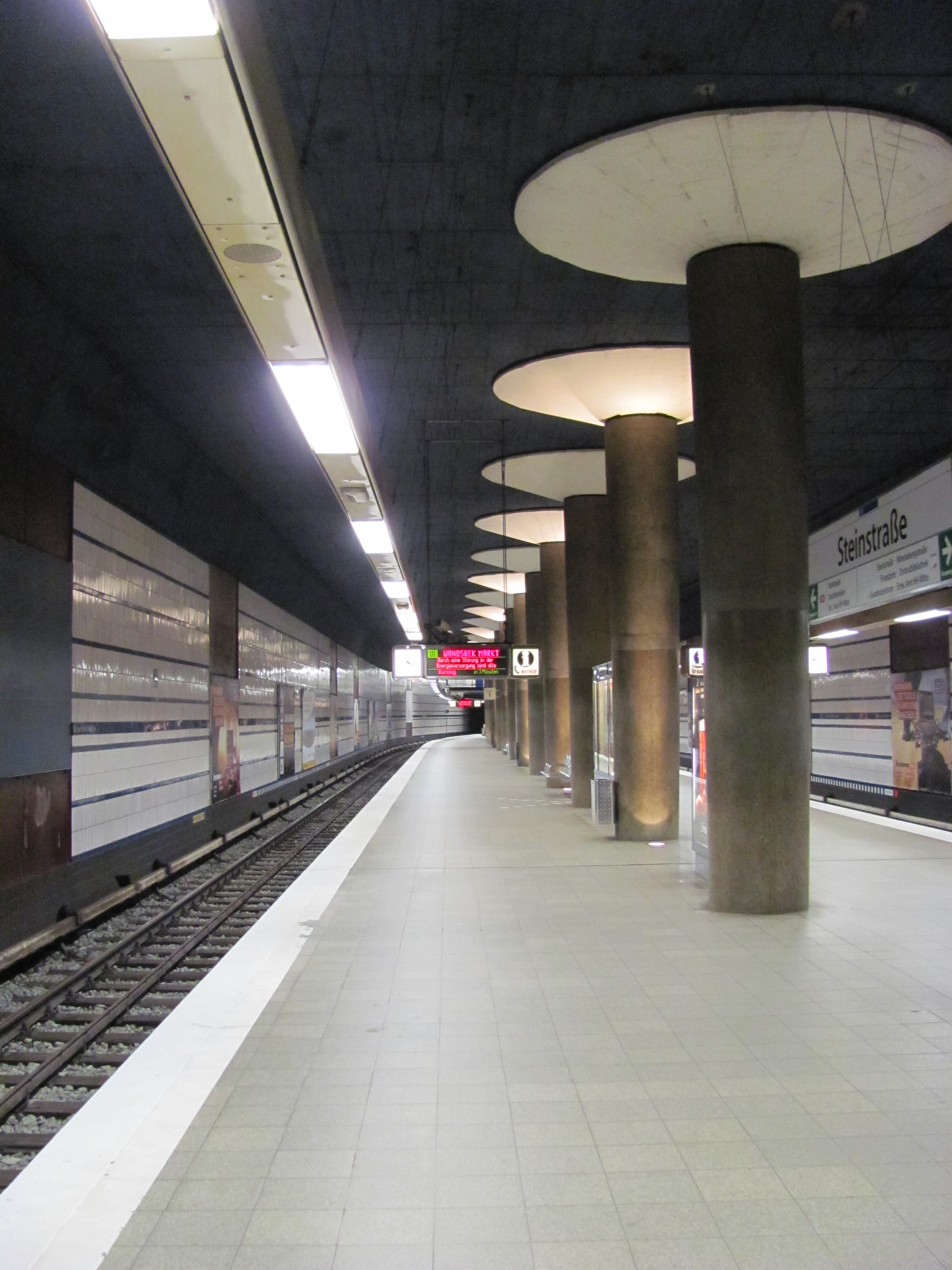
Steinstraße platform

== See also ==
- List of Hamburg U-Bahn stations
