= Lohmühlenstraße station =

Railway station in Hamburg, Germany

Coordinates: 53°33′25″N 10°1′12″E

Lohmühlenstraße
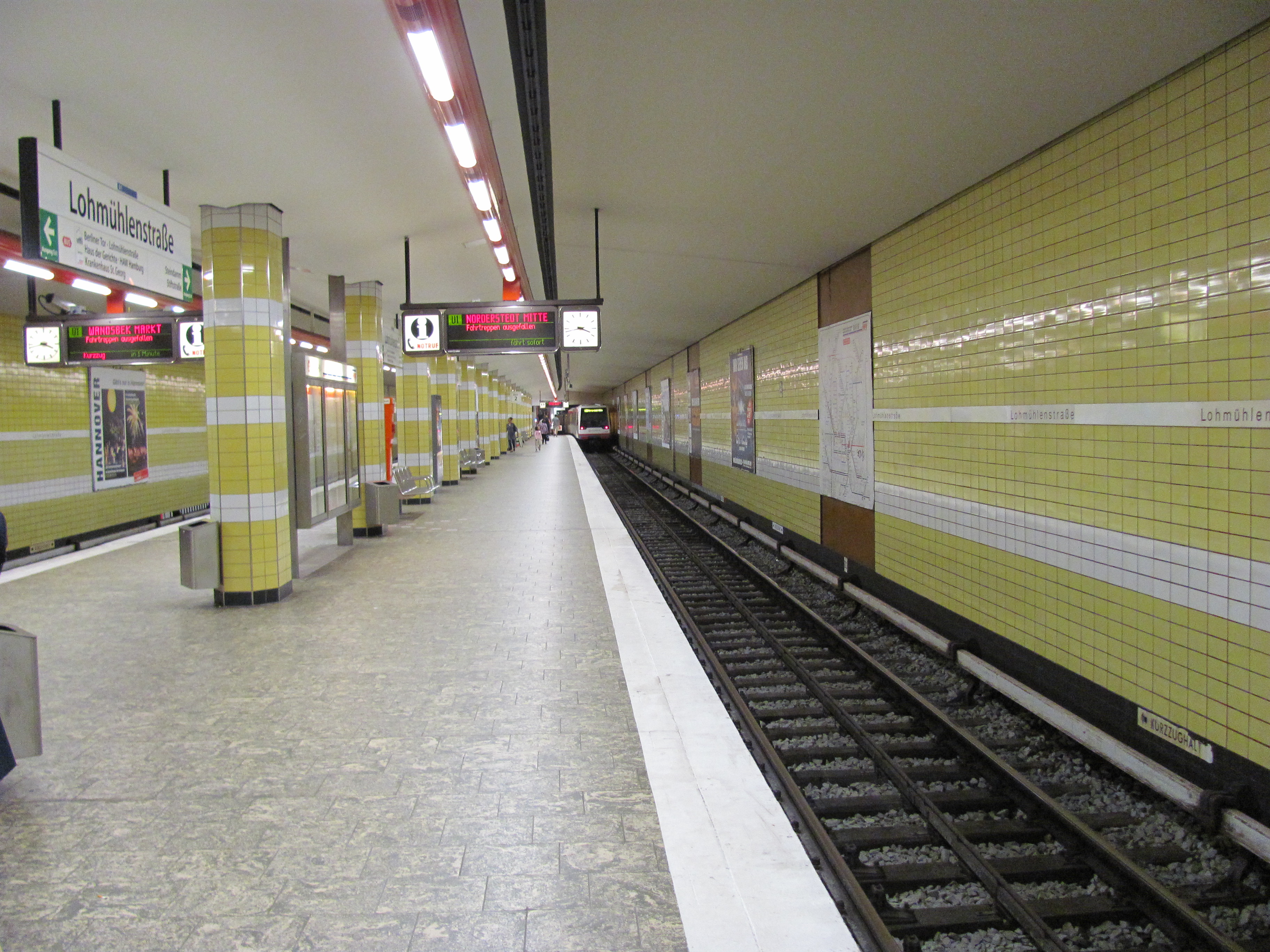
- Underground station Lohmühlenstraße

General information
- Location: Hamburg, Germany
- System: Rapid transit
- Platforms: 1
- Tracks: 2

Construction
- Structure type: Underground
- Platform levels: 2
- Accessible: Yes

Other information
- Fare zone: HVV: A/000

History
- Opened: 2 July 1961; 65 years ago
- Electrified: at opening 750 volts DC system (third rail)

Services
Preceding station	Hamburg U-Bahn	Following station
Hauptbahnhof Süd towards Norderstedt Mitte	U1	Lübecker Straße towards Großhansdorf or Ohlstedt
Location
- Location within Hamburg Location within Schleswig-Holstein Location within Germany Location within Europe

Lohmühlenstraße (German pronunciation: [loːˈmyːlɛnʃtʁaːsə]) is a public transport metro station for the rapid transit trains on the line U1 located in Hamburg, Germany in the quarter St. Georg in the Hamburg-Mitte borough.

The station is close to the St. Georg hospital and the main campus of the Hamburg University of Applied Sciences.

== Station layout ==
The station is underground with an island platform. There are two exits at its ends. In the entrance level is a shop but no lockerboxes. No personnel is attending the station but there are ticket machines, CCTV, and emergency and information telephones.

== See also ==
- Hamburger Verkehrsverbund (Public transport association for the Hamburg area)
- Hamburger Hochbahn (Operator of the Hamburg U-Bahn)
