= Wandsbek Markt station =

Rapid transit station in Hamburg

Wandsbek Markt
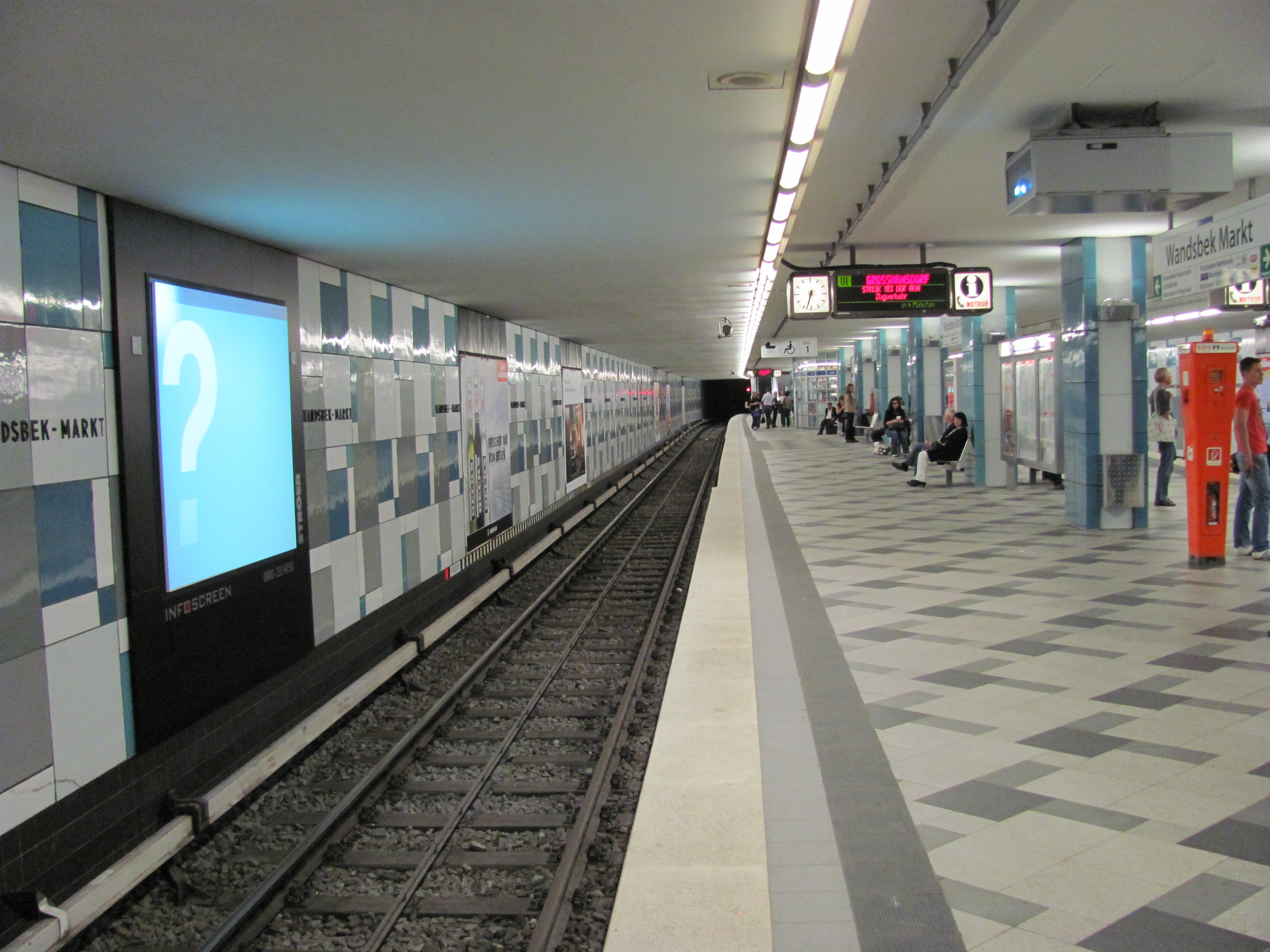

General information
- Location: Wandsbeker Marktplatz; 22041 Hamburg, Germany
- Coordinates: 53°34′19″N 10°04′04″E
- System: Hamburg U-Bahn station
- Operator: Hamburger Hochbahn AG
- Line: U1
- Platforms: 1 island platform
- Tracks: 2
- Connections: Bus, Taxi

Construction
- Structure type: Underground
- Accessible: Yes

Other information
- Station code: HHA: WM
- Fare zone: HVV: A/105 and 205

History
- Opened: 28 October 1962

Services
Preceding station	Hamburg U-Bahn	Following station
Wandsbeker Chaussee towards Norderstedt Mitte	U1	Straßburger Straße towards Großhansdorf or Ohlstedt
Location
- Location within Hamburg Location within Germany

Wandsbek Markt is a rapid transit station on the Hamburg U-Bahn line U1 and an important interchange station between Hamburger Hochbahn (HHA) trains and buses. The station was opened in October 1961 and is located at Wandsbeker Marktplatz in the center of Wandsbek, Germany. Wandsbek is center of the Hamburg borough of Wandsbek.

== History ==
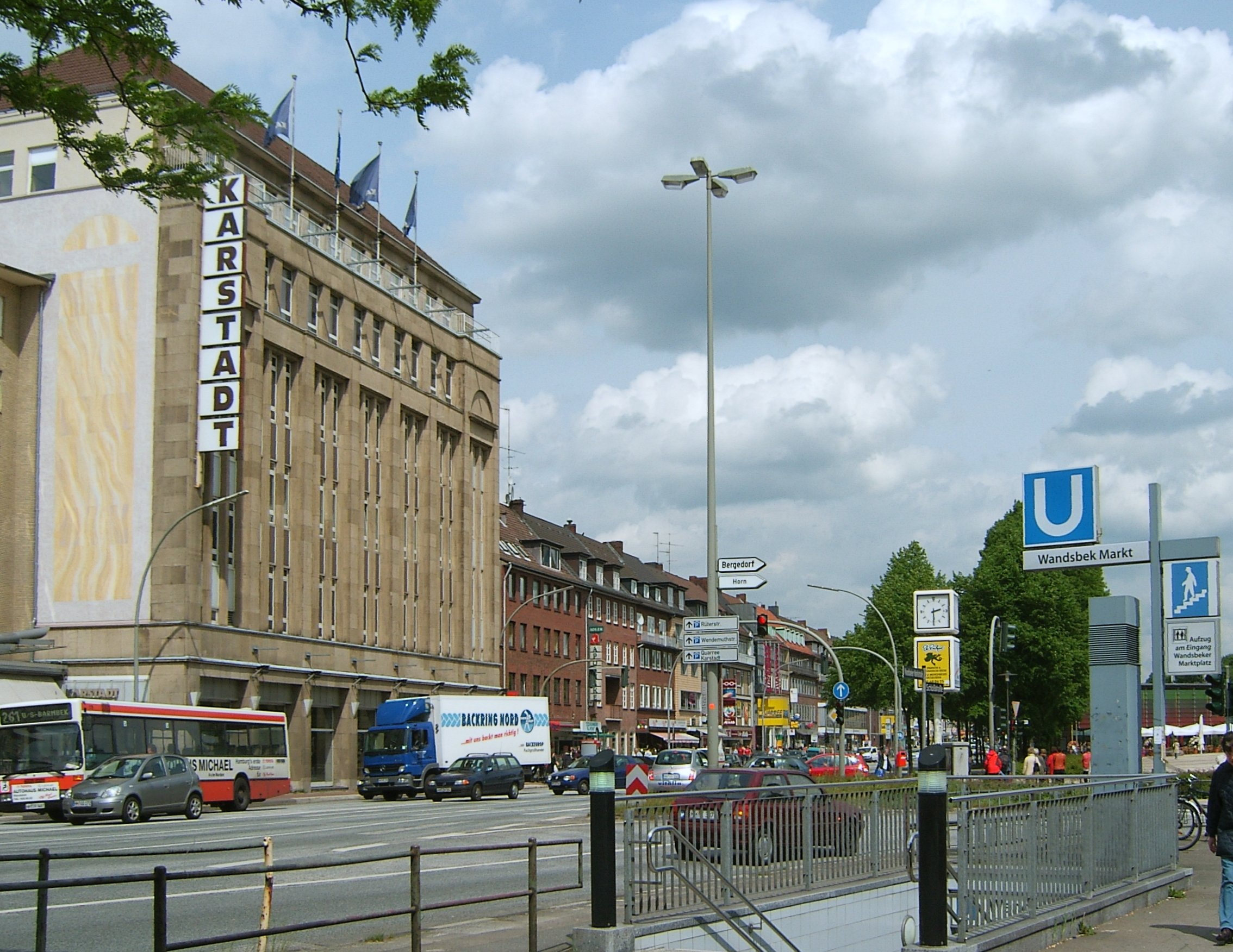
One of the station's entrances

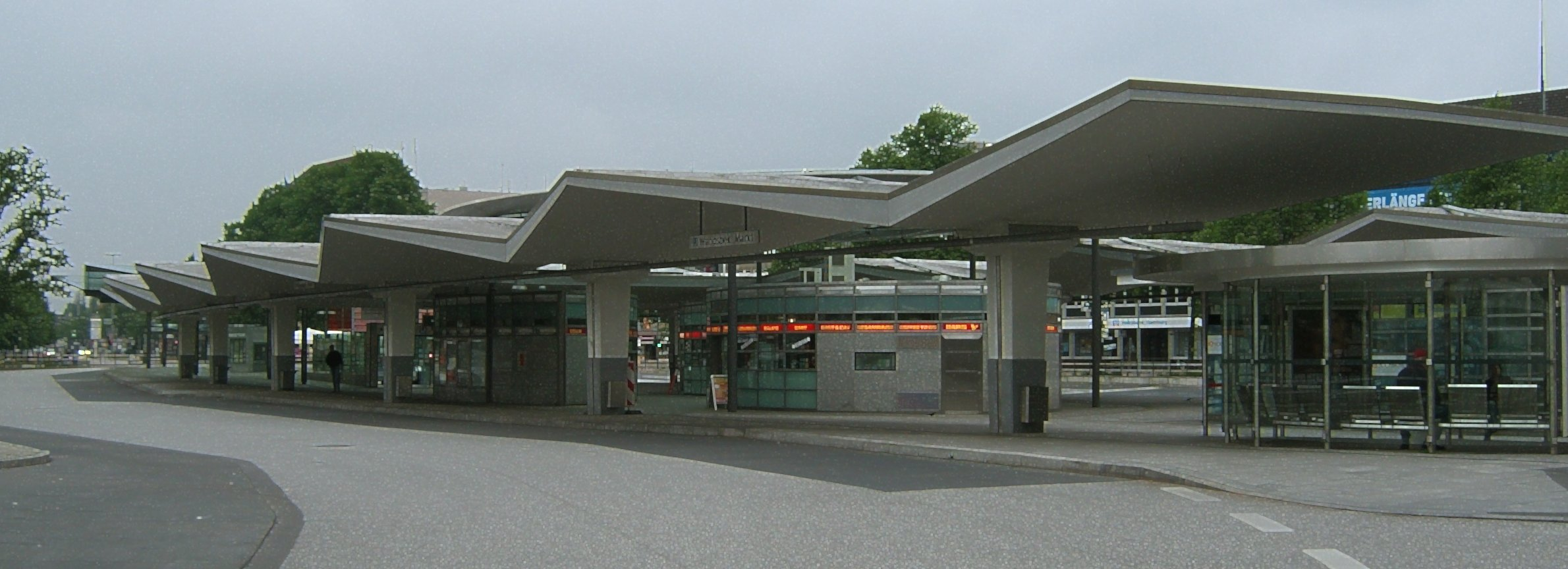
Roofed bus terminal

With construction starting in 1958, Wandsbek Markt was opened on 28 October 1962. Until 3 March 1963, it was a terminus station. The station was substantially renovated from 2000 until 2003, the bus terminal until 2005.

== Service ==
HVV runs one staffed service centre at Wandsbek Markt, along a number of sales points and ticket machines throughout the station.

=== Trains ===
Wandsbek Markt is served by Hamburg U-Bahn line U1; departures are every 5 minutes.

=== Bus ===
The central bus terminal (ZOB) is located on Wandsbeker Marktplatz, above the underground station. Among others, eight HHA transit bus lines, two express bus lines and three metro bus lines start at ZOB Wandsbek. At an average of some 50,000 passengers and 110 buses per hour, Wandsbek Markt is one of the largest bus terminals in Germany.

== See also ==
- List of Hamburg U-Bahn stations
