= Wartenau station =

Railway station in Hamburg, Germany

Wartenau
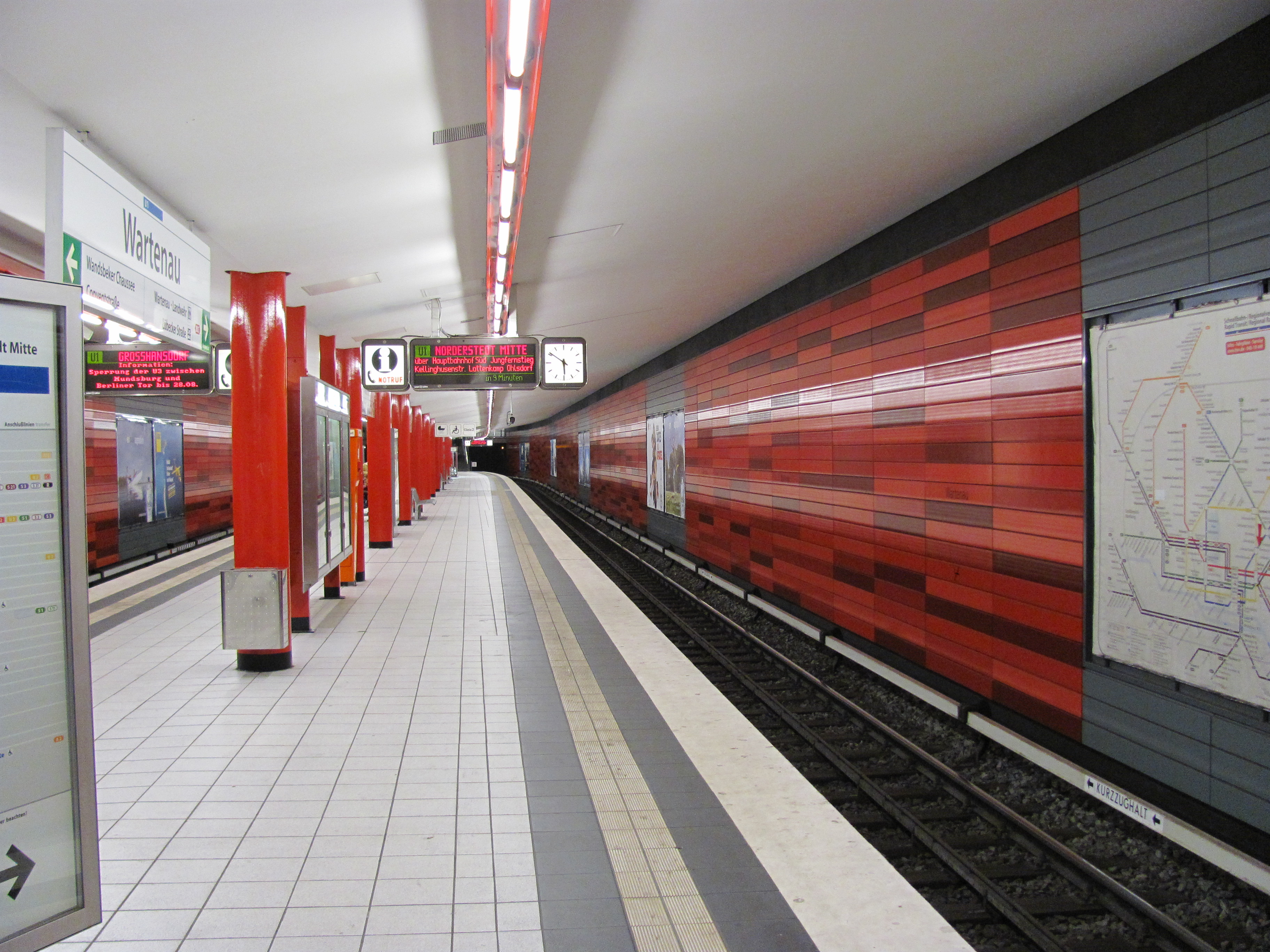

General information
- Location: Wandsbeker Chaussee; 22089 Hamburg, Germany
- Coordinates: 53°33′51″N 10°02′04″E
- System: Hamburg U-Bahn station
- Operator: Hamburger Hochbahn AG
- Line: U1
- Platforms: 1 island platform
- Tracks: 2

Construction
- Structure type: Underground
- Accessible: Yes

Other information
- Station code: HHA: WA
- Fare zone: HVV: A/105

History
- Opened: 2 October 1961; 64 years ago

Services
Preceding station	Hamburg U-Bahn	Following station
Lübecker Straße towards Norderstedt Mitte	U1	Ritterstraße towards Großhansdorf or Ohlstedt
Location
- Location within Hamburg Location within Germany

Wartenau is a through station on the Hamburg U-Bahn line U1. The station was opened in October 1961 and is located in the Hamburg district of Eilbek, Germany. Eilbek is part of the Hamburg borough of Wandsbek.

== Service ==
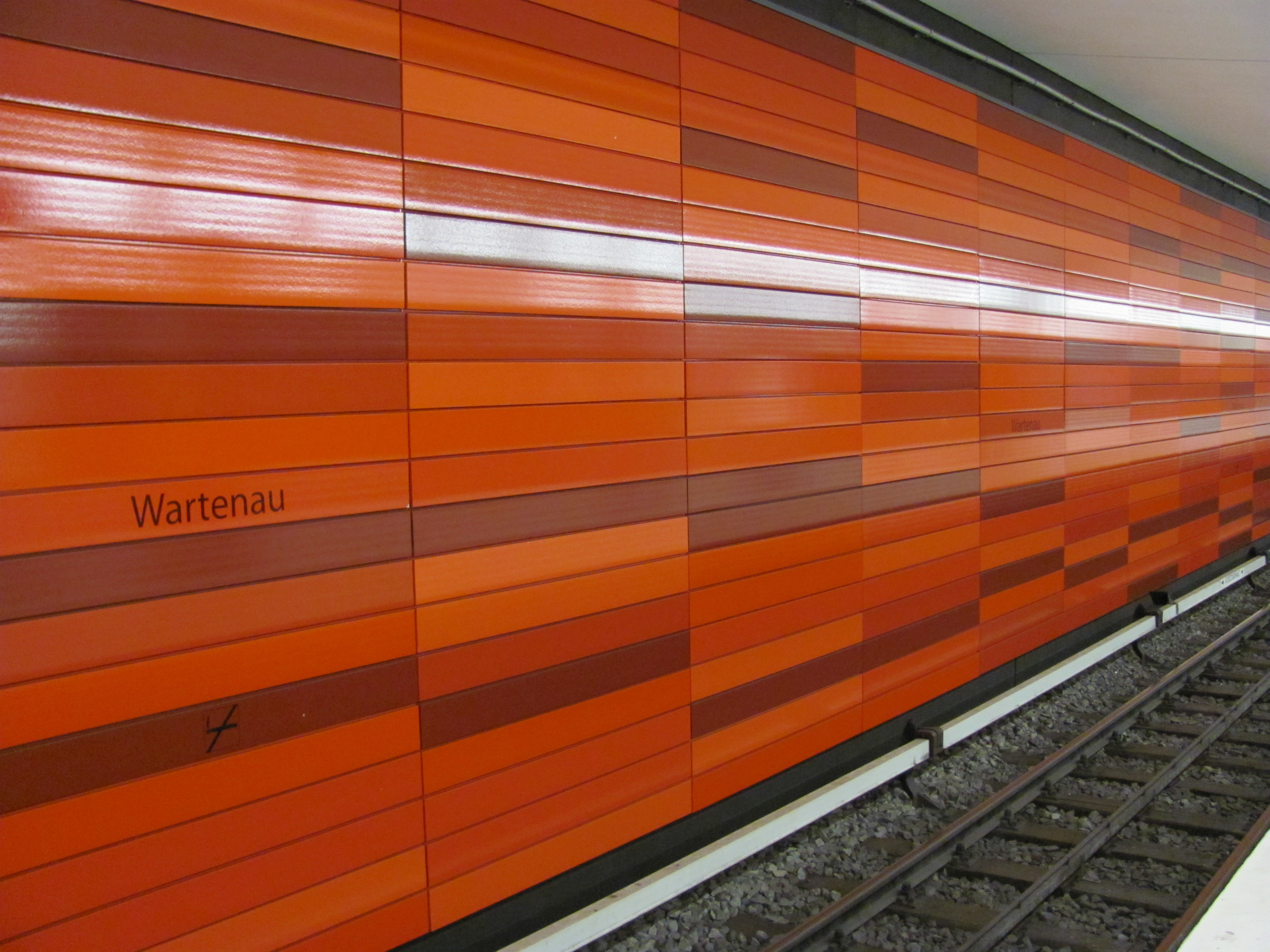
Wall tiles

=== Trains ===
Wartenau is served by Hamburg U-Bahn line U1; departures are every 5 minutes.

== See also ==
- List of Hamburg U-Bahn stations
