= Langenhorn Markt station =

Railway station in Hamburg, Germany

Langenhorn Markt
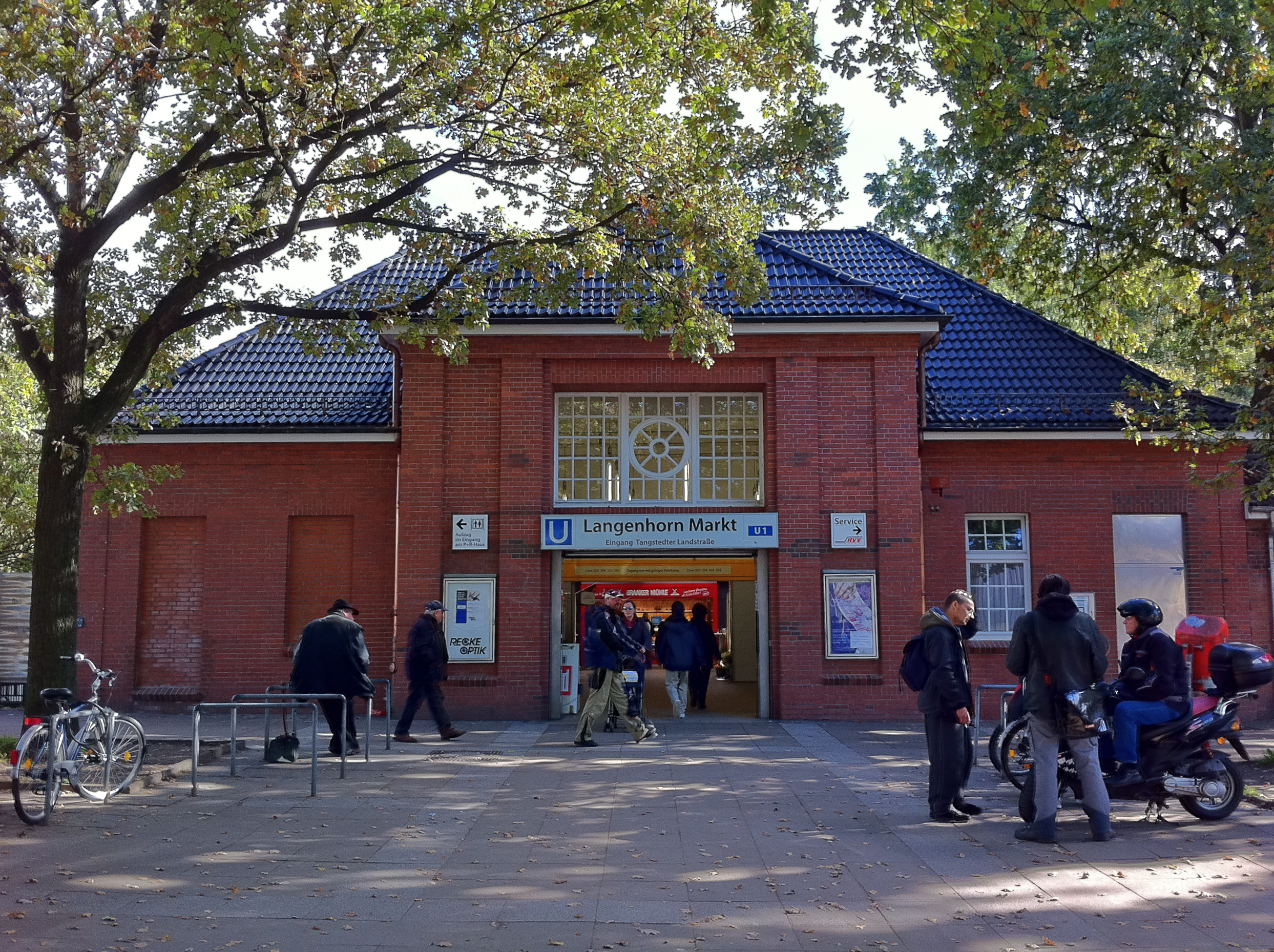
- Entrance at Tangstedter Landstraße

General information
- Location: Tangstedter Landstrasse; 22415 Hamburg; Germany
- Coordinates: 53.6491°N 10.0172°E
- System: Hamburg U-Bahn station
- Operator: Hamburger Hochbahn AG
- Line: U1
- Platforms: 1 island platform
- Tracks: 2
- Connections: Bus

Construction
- Structure type: Terrain cutting
- Accessible: Yes

Other information
- Station code: HHA: LM
- Fare zone: HVV: A and B/203, 204, 303, and 304

History
- Opened: 1 July 1921
- Electrified: at opening
- Former names: 1921-1969 Langenhorn Mitte

Services
Preceding station	Hamburg U-Bahn	Following station
Langenhorn Nord towards Norderstedt Mitte	U1	Fuhlsbüttel Nord towards Großhansdorf or Ohlstedt
Location

Langenhorn Markt (Langenhorn Marketplace) is a station on the Hamburg U-Bahn line U1. It was opened in July 1921 and is located in Hamburg, Germany, in the quarter of Langenhorn. Langenhorn is part of the borough of Hamburg-Nord.

== History ==
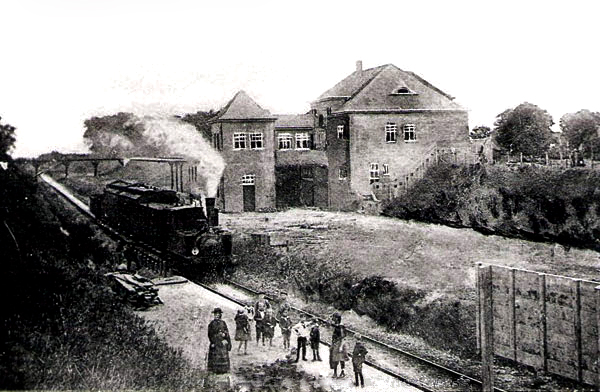
Picture of the station in 1919; U-Bahn tracks not yet completed, a steam train serves the station on the freight railway track with a preliminary platform

The station was opened in July 1921 as Langenhorn Mitte (Langenhorn Centre), after the Langenhorn railway was in preliminary operation with steam trains since 5 January 1918. The steam trains then used the track of the freight railway from Ohlsdorf to Ochsenzoll, which was located east of the U-Bahn tracks. It was used until 1991 and removed in 2008. In 1966 a new shopping mall was built which extended the marketplace of Langenhorn. Therefore, the station was renamed on 2 June 1969 into Langenhorn Markt. At the beginning of the 1970s the street of Krohnstieg was also extended, and a new bridge for it was constructed, leading across the station and the U-Bahn tracks. In 1973 also a new Park and ride facility was built, which was opened in August 1975 along with the new station entrance from the north, and the station was fully renovated at the same time. Only the old entrance building remained from the old station.

== Station layout ==
The station is located in a terrain cutting with an island platform and two tracks. The station is fully accessible for handicapped persons, as there is a lift.

== Service ==
Langenhorn Markt is served by Hamburg U-Bahn line U1; departures are every 5 minutes, every 10 minutes in non-busy periods. Metro bus line 24, bus lines 192, 193, and 292, and night bus line 606 have a stop in front of the station.

== See also ==
- List of Hamburg U-Bahn stations
