= Langenhorn Nord station =

Railway station in Hamburg, Germany

Langenhorn Nord
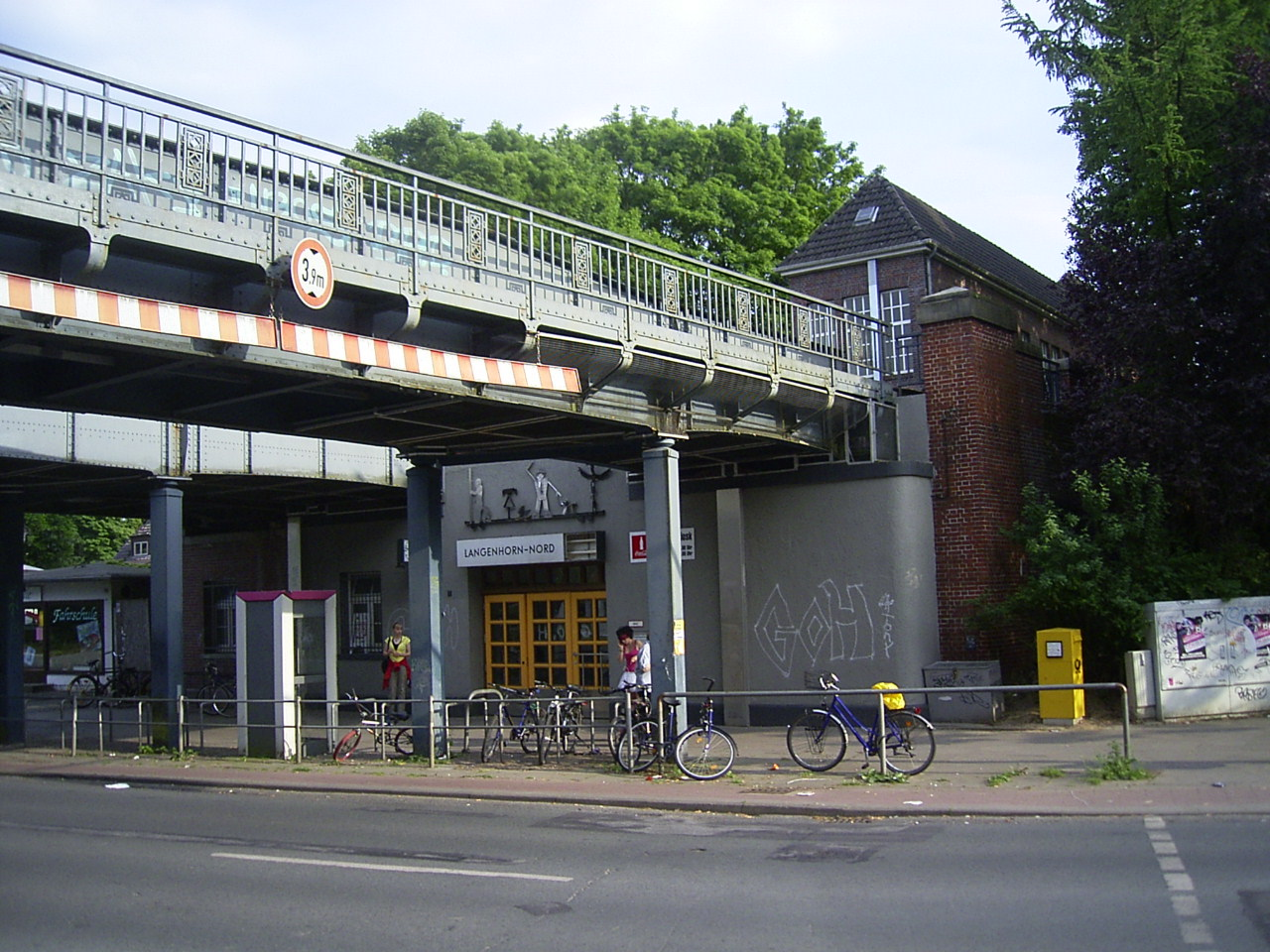
- Entrance at Foorthkamp

General information
- Location: Foorthkamp; 22417 Hamburg; Germany
- Coordinates: 53.6608°N 10.0175°E
- System: Hamburg U-Bahn station
- Operator: Hamburger Hochbahn AG
- Line: U1
- Platforms: 1 island platform
- Tracks: 2
- Connections: Bus

Construction
- Structure type: Elevated
- Accessible: Yes

Other information
- Station code: HHA: LN
- Fare zone: HVV: B/303 and 304

History
- Opened: 1 July 1921

Services
Preceding station	Hamburg U-Bahn	Following station
Kiwittsmoor towards Norderstedt Mitte	U1	Langenhorn Markt towards Großhansdorf or Ohlstedt
Location

Langenhorn Nord (Langenhorn North) is a station on the Hamburg U-Bahn line U1. It was opened in July 1921 and is located in Hamburg, Germany, in the quarter of Langenhorn. Langenhorn is part of the borough of Hamburg-Nord.

== History ==
The station was opened in July 1921, after the Langenhorn railway was in preliminary operation with steam trains since 5 January 1918. However, a preliminary platform at Langenhorn Nord station was opened only on 1 September 1919. The steam trains then used the track of the freight railway from Ohlsdorf to Ochsenzoll, which was located east of the U-Bahn tracks. It was used until 1991 and removed in 2008.

There was little traffic at the beginning, but it increased during the 1920s, after nearby Fritz-Schumacher-Siedlung (Fritz Schumacher settlement) had been built. However, major apartment buildings in the area were constructed in the 1950s and 60s. In 1940 the platform was extended to facilitate the stop of longer trains.

In 2013, the platform was fully renovated and elevated at the same time to allow handicapped persons a better access to the trains. The addition of a lift is projected.

== Station layout ==
Langenhorn Nord is an elevated station with an island platform and two tracks. The station is not accessible for handicapped persons, as there is no lift.

== Service ==
Langenhorn Nord is served by Hamburg U-Bahn line U1; departures are every 5 minutes, every 10 minutes in non-busy periods. Bus line 192, and night bus line 606 have a stop at the station, whereas the night buses and buses in northern direction stop at the nearby street of Tangstedter Landstraße, 100m east of the station.

== See also ==
- List of Hamburg U-Bahn stations
