= Oldenfelde station =

Railway station in Hamburg, Germany

Oldenfelde
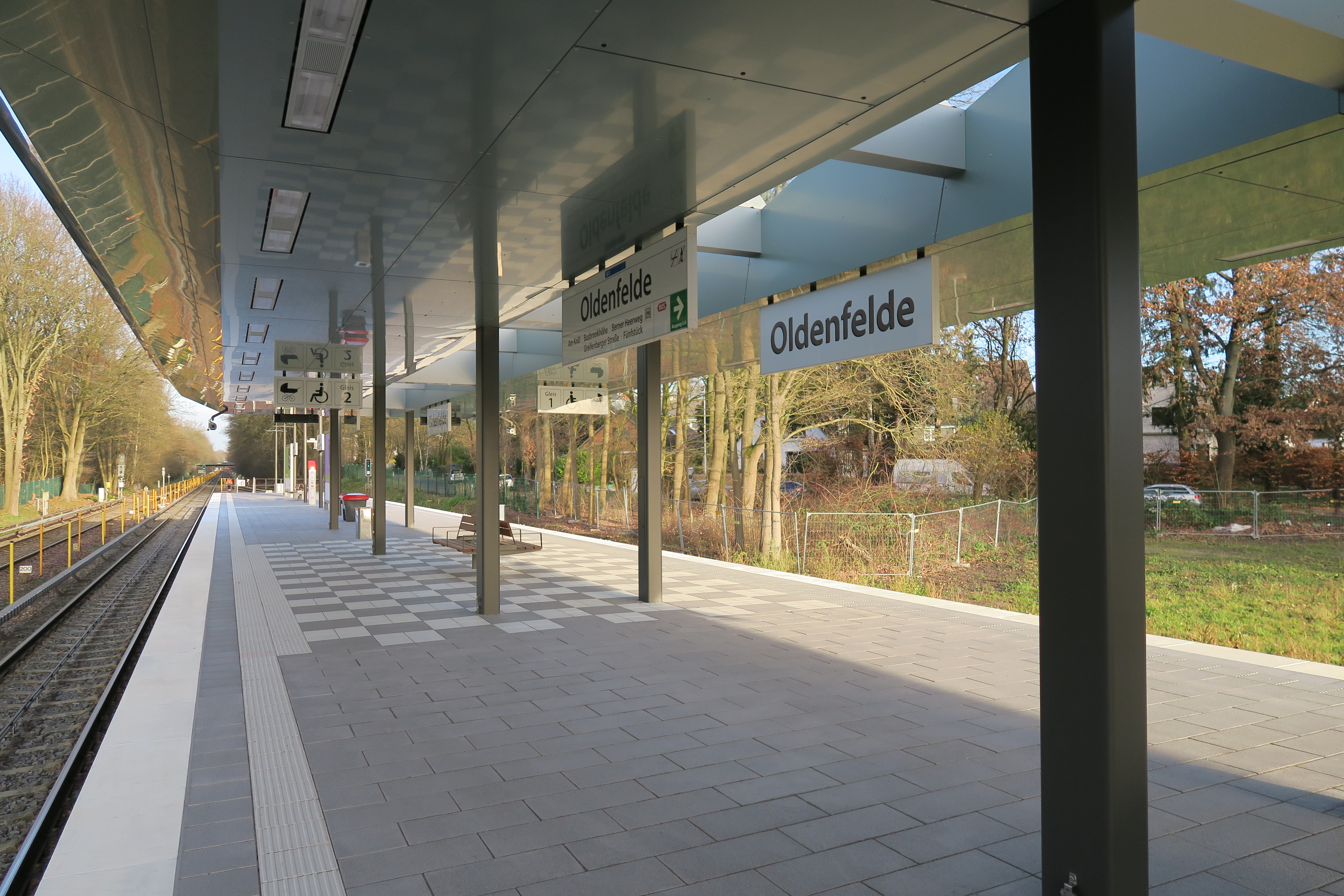

General information
- Location: Wandsbek, Hamburg; Germany
- Coordinates: 53°37′4″N 10°7′44″E
- System: Hamburg U-Bahn station
- Operator: Hamburger Hochbahn AG
- Line: U1
- Platforms: 1 island platform
- Tracks: 2

Construction
- Structure type: At grade
- Accessible: Yes

Other information
- Station code: HHA: OF
- Fare zone: HVV: B/304 and 305

History
- Opened: 9 December 2019; 6 years ago
- Electrified: at opening

Services
Preceding station	Hamburg U-Bahn	Following station
Farmsen towards Norderstedt Mitte	U1	Berne towards Großhansdorf or Ohlstedt
Location
- Location within Hamburg

Oldenfelde is a station on the Hamburg U-Bahn line U1 located on the border of the quarters of Farmsen-Berne and Rahlstedt. The name is derived from the Rahlstedt neighborhood of Oldenfelde. The planning approval process began in November 2016, construction began on 16 February 2018, and the station opened on 9 December 2019. At the end of 2016, around 20.3 million euros were earmarked for the construction of the new stop.

== Location and structure ==
The Oldenfelde underground station was built between the Farmsen and Berne stops, which were about 2.6 km apart, the second longest distance between stops in the Hamburg underground network. It provides access to residential areas in which about 4500 people live. Access to the station is from the street Busbrookhöhe to the west and, through a footpath leading to the southern end of the central platform, the street Am Knill to the east. An originally planned additional northern access was not realized due to a recently built playground.

The existing service and test track running parallel to this section of line was not affected by the station's construction dimensions and was retained.

== Service ==
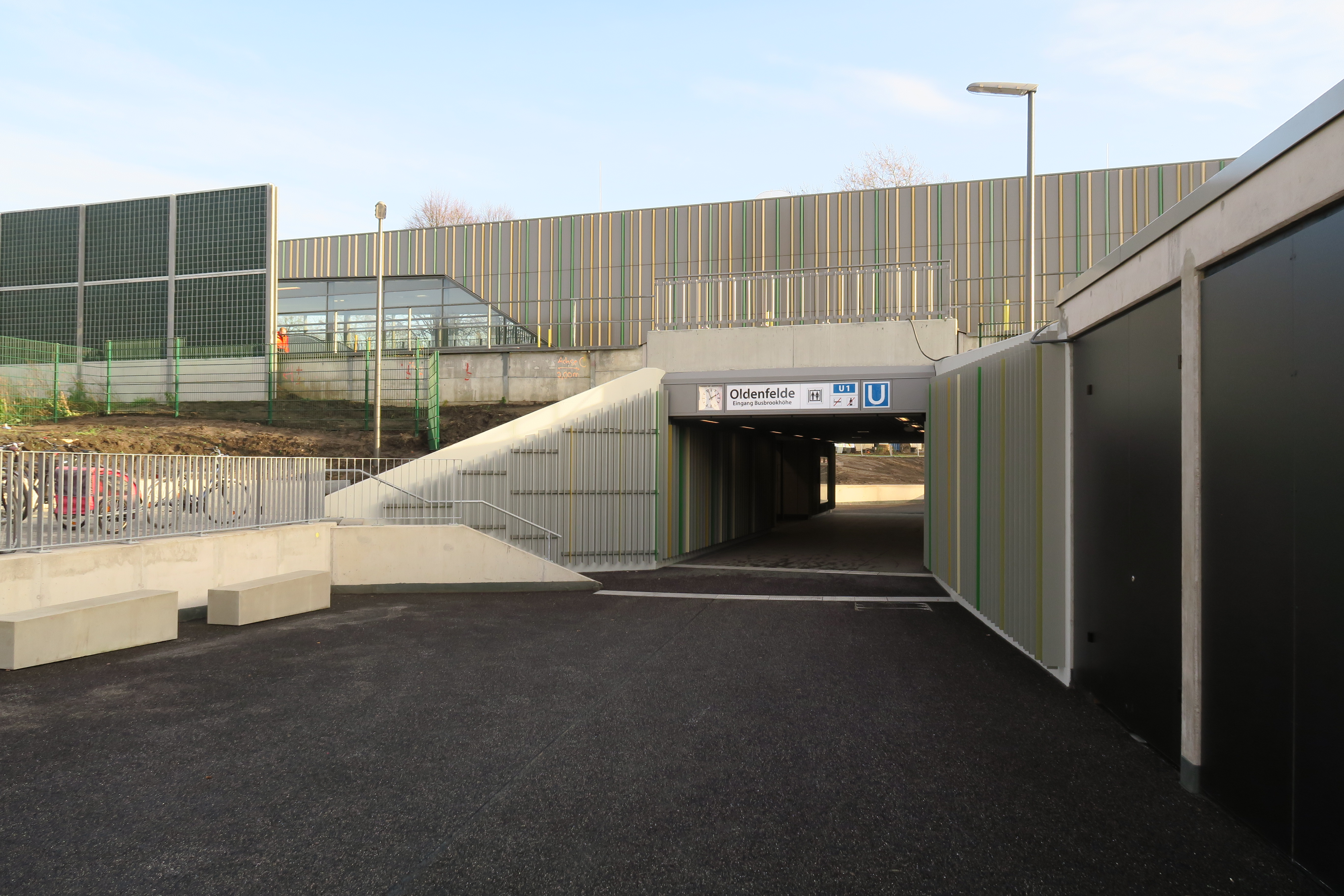
Busbrookhöhe entrance

=== Trains ===
Oldenfelde is served by Hamburg U-Bahn line U1; departures are every 5 minutes. The travel time to Hamburg Hauptbahnhof is about 22 minutes.
