= Berne station (Hamburg U-Bahn) =

Railway station in Hamburg, Germany

Berne
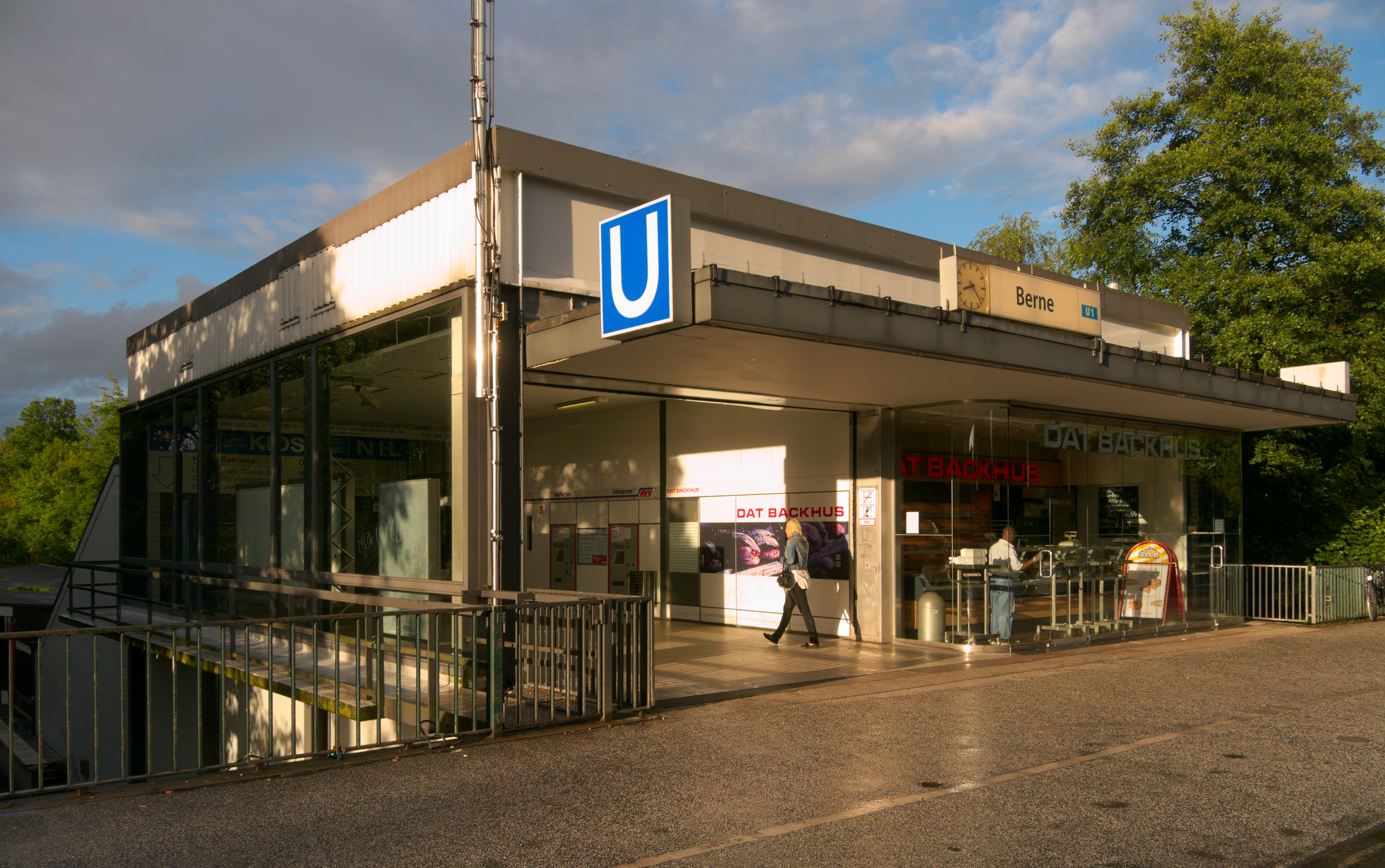

General information
- Location: Berner Heerweg; 22159 Hamburg, Germany
- Coordinates: 53.6270°N 10.1398°E
- System: Hamburg U-Bahn station
- Operator: Hamburger Hochbahn AG
- Line: U1
- Platforms: 1 island platforms
- Tracks: 2

Construction
- Structure type: Terrain cutting
- Accessible: Yes

Other information
- Station code: HHA: BE
- Fare zone: HVV: B/304 and 305

History
- Opened: 12 September 1918; 107 years ago
- Electrified: 6 September 1920; 105 years ago

Services
Preceding station	Hamburg U-Bahn	Following station
Oldenfelde towards Norderstedt Mitte	U1	Meiendorfer Weg towards Großhansdorf or Ohlstedt
Location

Berne is a rapid transit station located in the Hamburg quarter of Farmsen-Berne, Germany. The station was opened in 1918 and is served by Hamburg U-Bahn line U1.

== History ==
The station was constructed from 1912 to 1914 and opened on 12 September 1918 on the Walddörfer railway line. The station was served by steam trains until 29 September 1919 and re-opened after electrification of one track on 6 September 1920. A second electrified track opened in 1923.

The station was located in a rural environment until the 1950s, when a local community center developed east of the station. Because the main entrance was at Berner Heerweg west of the station, the entranceway was re-built and a second entrance from the east was added, the two entrances linked by a bridge across the U-Bahn tracks. A restaurant can be found in the former station building today.

At the station, a third track without a platform is located. Originally built for goods transports of Altrahlstedt-Wohldorfer Kleinbahn (local railway), it was later re-built and used for brake tests and other U-Bahn test driving starting from nearby Farmsen railway workshop.

== Service ==
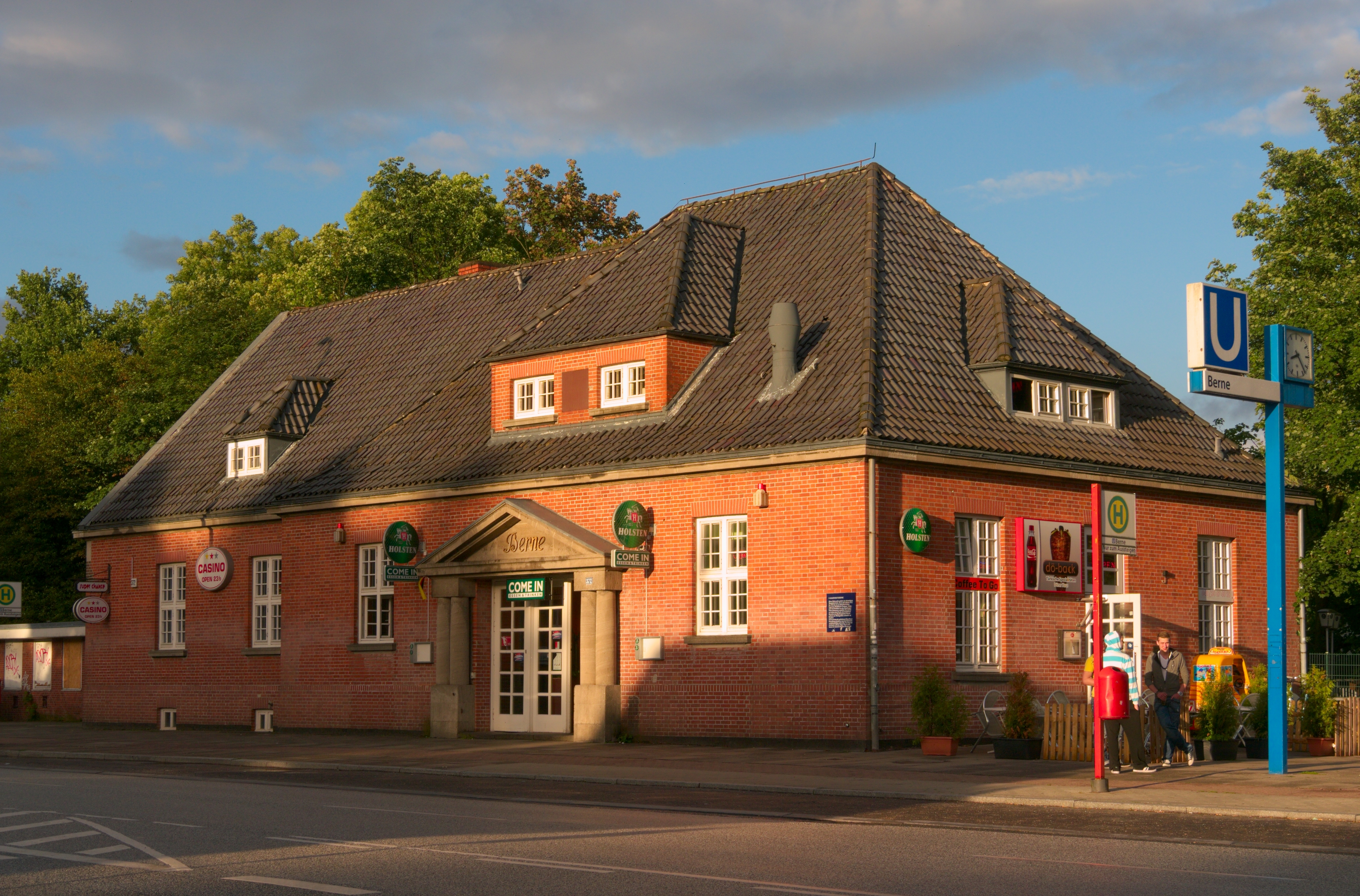
Former station building, now a restaurant

=== Trains ===
Berne is served by Hamburg U-Bahn line U1; departures are every 10 minutes. The travel time to Hamburg Hauptbahnhof is about 24 minutes.

== See also ==
- List of Hamburg U-Bahn stations
