= Richtweg station =

Rapid transit station in Germany

Coordinates: 53°41′44″N 9°59′22″E

Richtweg
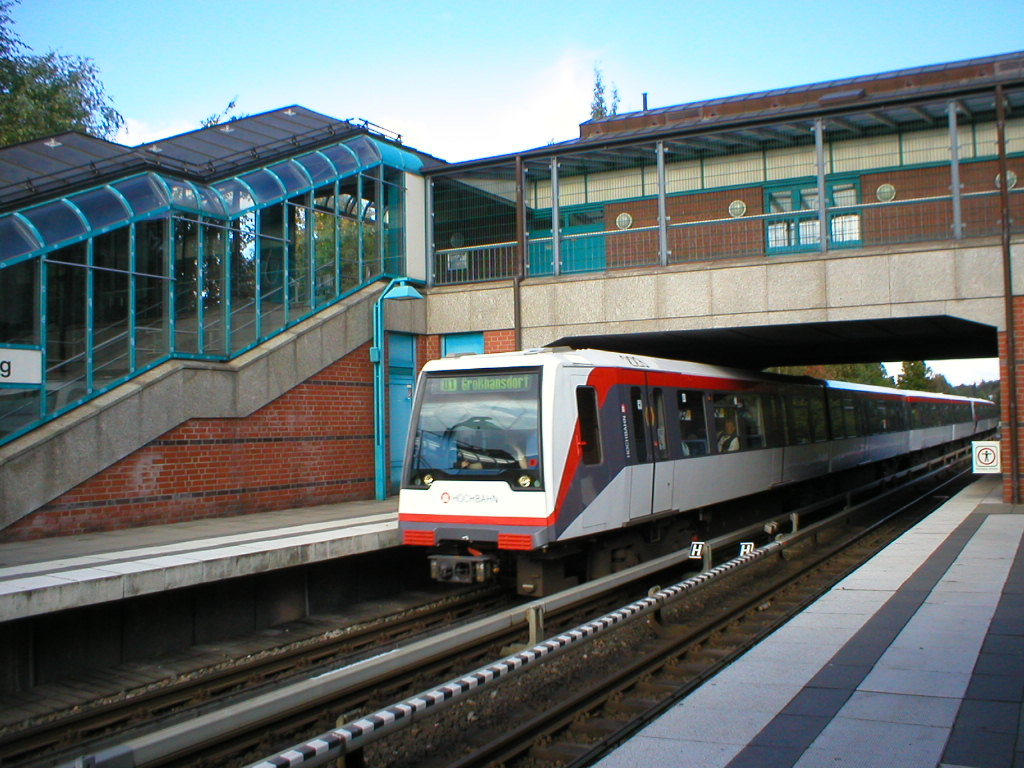
- Richtweg station with incoming train

General information
- Location: Norderstedt, Germany
- System: Hamburg U-Bahn station
- Owner: Verkehrsgesellschaft Norderstedt (VGN)
- Line: U1
- Platforms: 2 side platforms
- Tracks: 2

Construction
- Structure type: At grade
- Accessible: yes

Other information
- Station code: ID: 895139
- Fare zone: HVV: B/403

History
- Opened: 17 May 1953
- Rebuilt: 28 September 1996
- Electrified: 750 volts DC system third rail

Services
Preceding station	Hamburg U-Bahn	Following station
Norderstedt Mitte Terminus	U1	Garstedt towards Großhansdorf or Ohlstedt
Location
- Location within Hamburg Location within Schleswig-Holstein Location within Germany Location within Europe

Richtweg is a public transport station for the rapid transit trains of Hamburg's underground railway line U1, located in Norderstedt, Germany.

It was opened in 1953 as a stop of the Alster Northern Railway (ANB) from Ulzburg Süd to Ochsenzoll with an island platform. Between 1994 and 1996 this section of the ANB was rebuilt for the Hamburg U-Bahn system.

== Station layout ==
The station is a side platform station with a passenger bridge crossing at the north and exits to both sides of it.

== See also ==
- Hamburger Verkehrsverbund Public transport association in Hamburg
- Hamburger Hochbahn Operator of the Hamburg U-Bahn
