= Trabrennbahn station =

Railway station in Hamburg, Germany

Coordinates: 53.5981°N 10.1019°E

Trabrennbahn
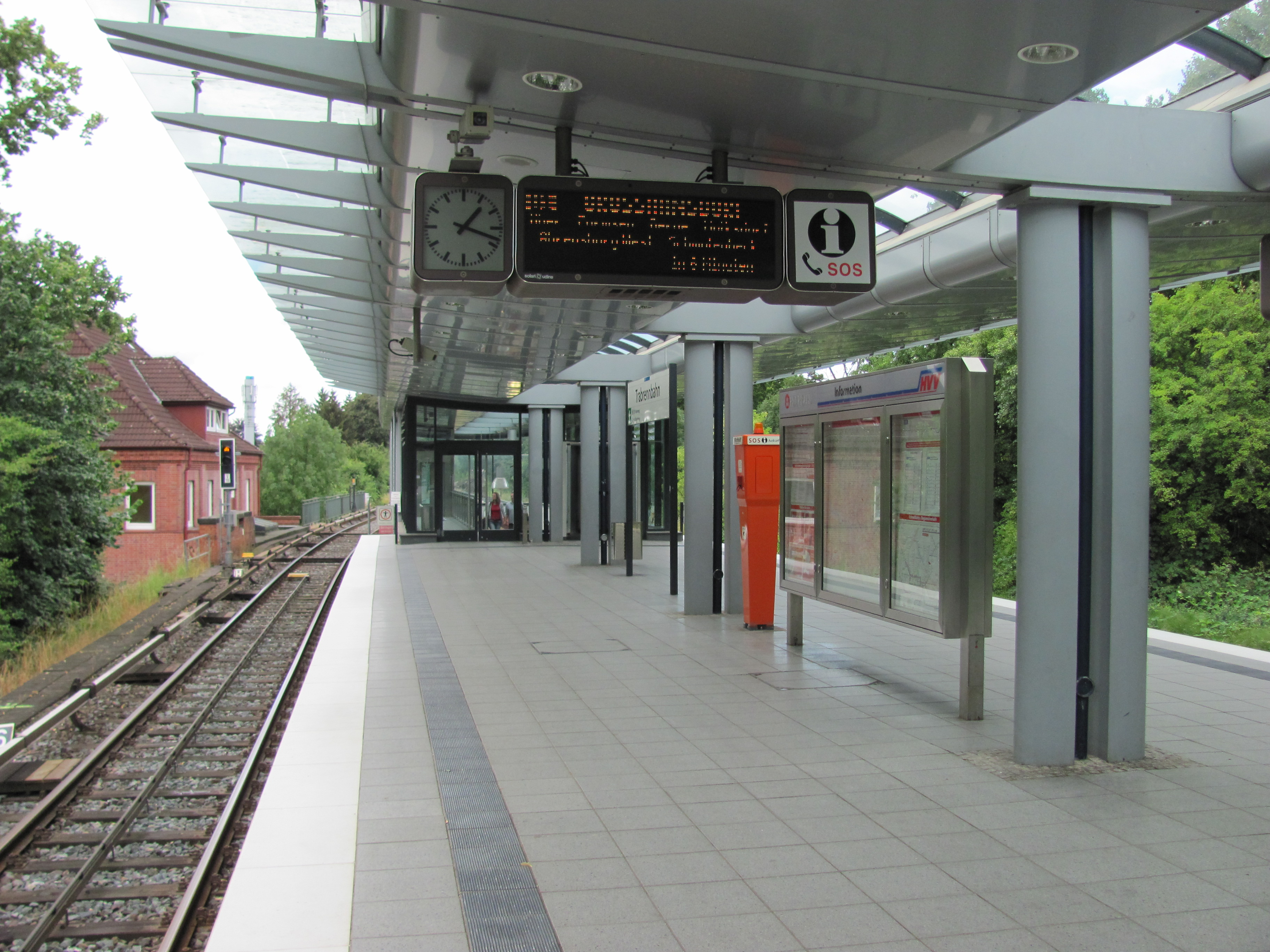

General information
- Location: Traberweg; 22159 Hamburg, Germany
- System: Hamburg U-Bahn station
- Operator: Hamburger Hochbahn AG
- Line: U1
- Platforms: 1 island platform
- Tracks: 2

Construction
- Structure type: Elevated
- Accessible: Yes

Other information
- Station code: HHA: TR
- Fare zone: HVV: A/204 and 205

History
- Opened: 30 March 1924

Services
Preceding station	Hamburg U-Bahn	Following station
Wandsbek-Gartenstadt towards Norderstedt Mitte	U1	Farmsen towards Großhansdorf or Ohlstedt
Location

Trabrennbahn (Trotting Course) is a rapid transit station located in the Hamburg quarter of Farmsen-Berne, Germany. The station was opened in 1924 and is served by Hamburg U-Bahn line U1.

== History ==
The station was constructed from 1912 to 1914, but opened only on 30 March 1924 as a request stop on the Walddörfer railway line, as a horse race took place on the nearby race track of Trabrennbahn Farmsen. The population was sparse in the vicinity, so the stop was not needed during the first years except for horse riding events. For the latter use, in 1931, a train reversing facility with four siding tracks was built. Since 1 October 1933 the station was serviced constantly.

The reversing facility was later reduced to two tracks and dismantled in 1971, as there were less horse races. The course of Trabrennbahn Farmsen was closed in the 1980s. The station was fully renovated in 2001, and a lift was added then. There were plans to rename it to Traberweg but the name was kept because the compound of former Trabrennbahn, re-developed as a residential area, was considered as a benchmark in the area.

== Service ==
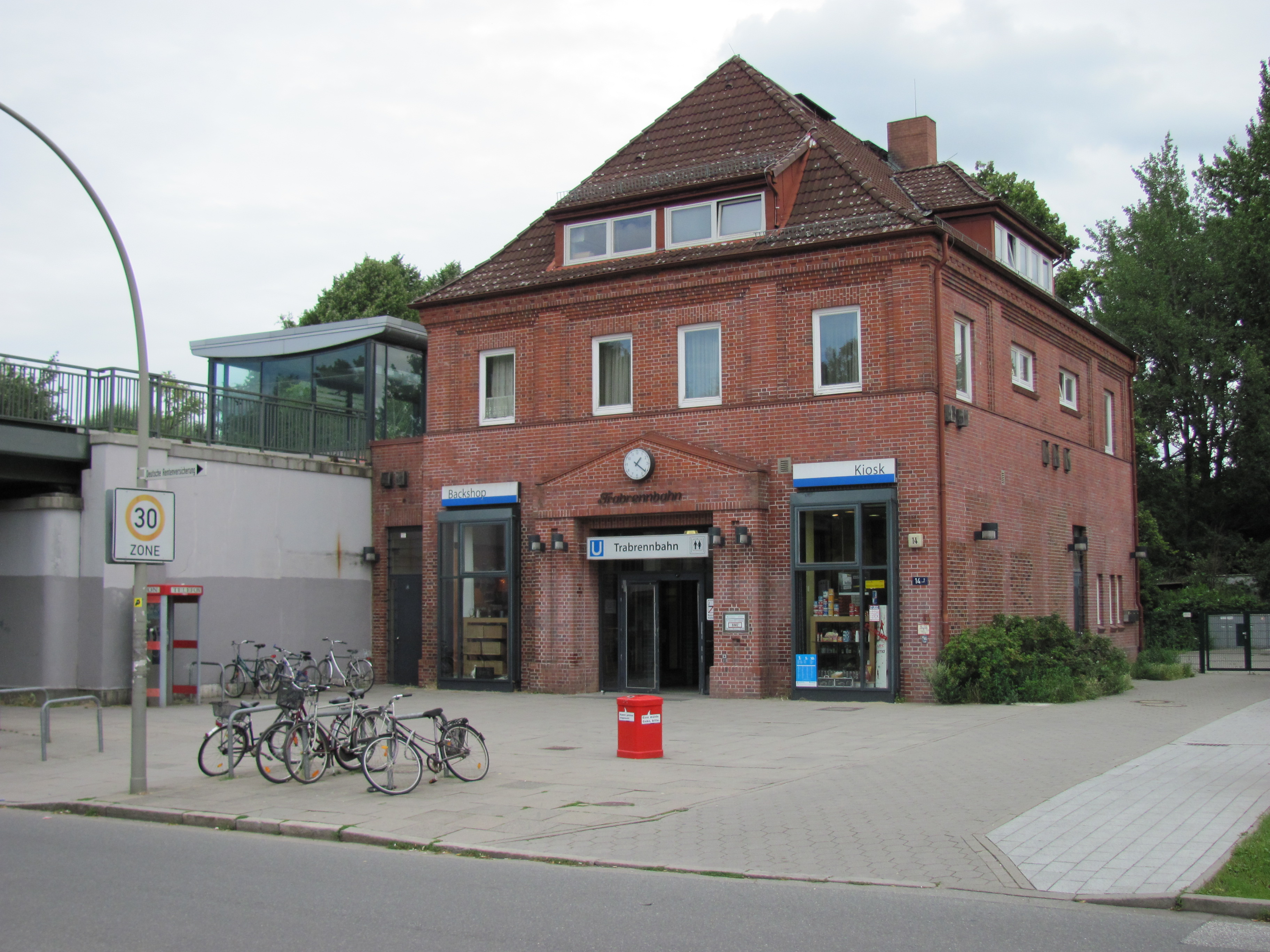
The station's entrance building

=== Trains ===
Trabrennbahn is served by Hamburg U-Bahn line U1; departures are every 5 minutes. The travel time to Hamburg Hauptbahnhof is about 18 minutes.

== See also ==
- List of Hamburg U-Bahn stations
