= Fuhlsbüttel Nord station =

Railway station in Hamburg, Germany

Coordinates: 53.6397°N 10.0167°E

Fuhlsbüttel Nord
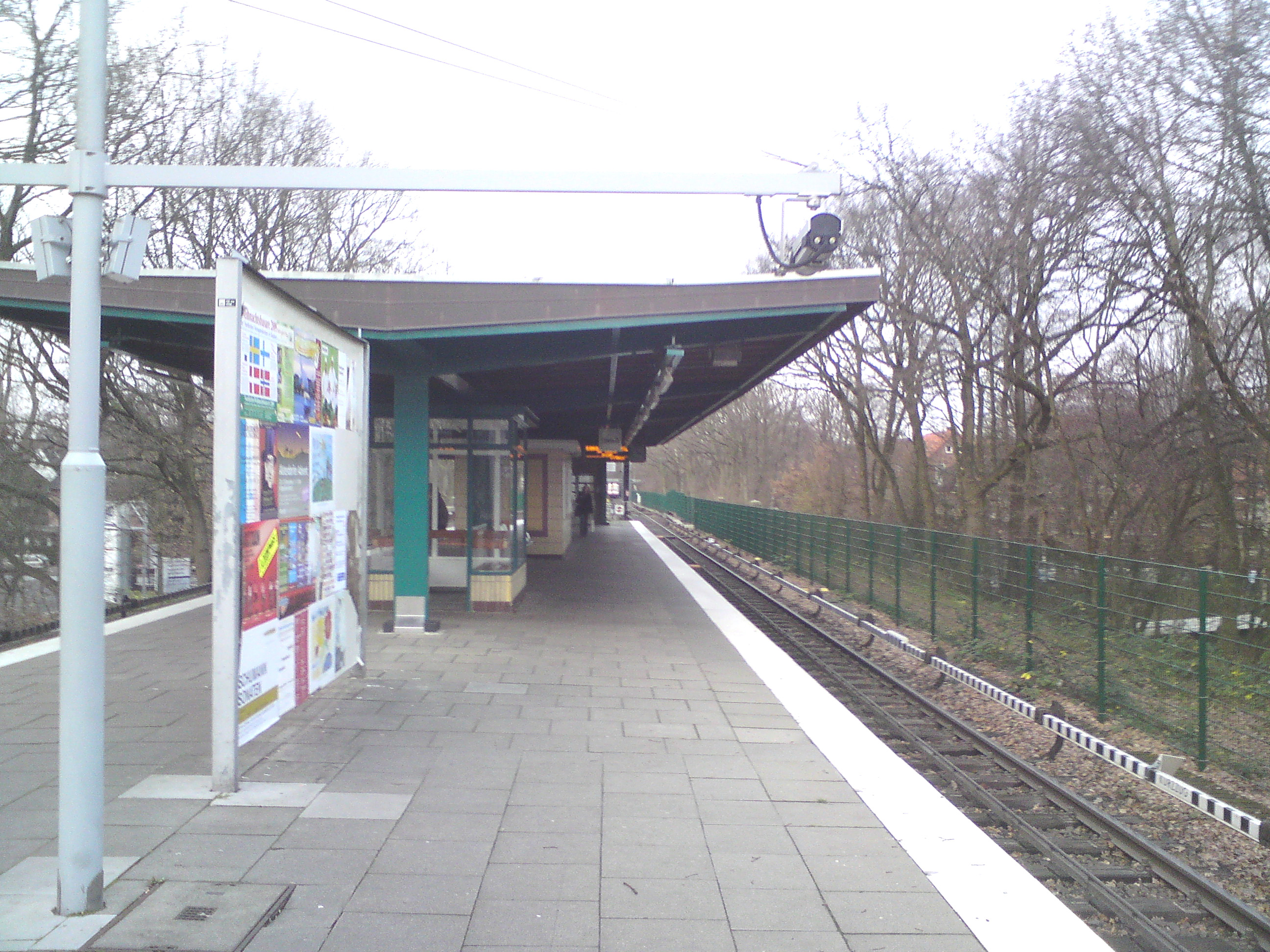

General information
- Location: Flughafenstraße; 22415 Hamburg, Germany; Germany
- System: Hamburg U-Bahn station
- Operator: Hamburger Hochbahn AG
- Line: U1
- Platforms: 1 island platform
- Tracks: 2
- Connections: Bus 172

Construction
- Structure type: Elevated
- Cycle facilities: Outside bicycle parking
- Accessible: Yes

Other information
- Station code: HHA: FL
- Fare zone: HVV: A/203 and 204

History
- Opened: 1 July 1921; 105 years ago
- Rebuilt: 2020
- Former names: 1921-1934 Langenhorn Süd; 1934-1954 Flughafen; 1954-1984 Flughafenstraße

Services
Preceding station	Hamburg U-Bahn	Following station
Langenhorn Markt towards Norderstedt Mitte	U1	Fuhlsbüttel towards Großhansdorf or Ohlstedt
Location

Fuhlsbüttel Nord (Fuhlsbüttel North) is a station on the Hamburg U-Bahn line U1. It was opened in July 1921 and is located in Hamburg, Germany, on the boundaries of the quarters of Fuhlsbüttel and Langenhorn. Both are part of the borough of Hamburg-Nord.

== History ==
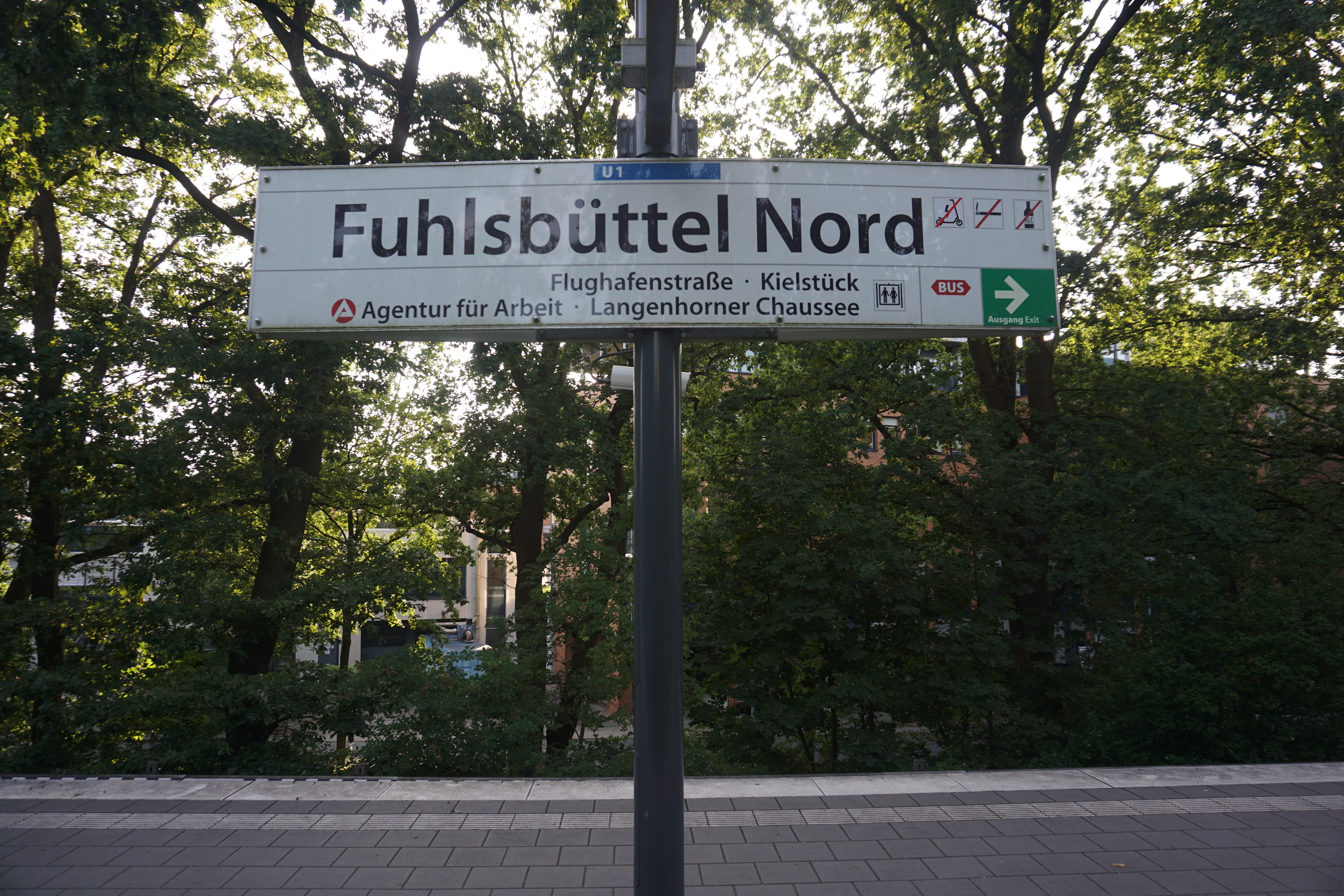
Sign inside the station

The station was opened in July 1921, after the Langenhorn railway was in preliminary operation with steam trains since 5 January 1918. But in 1918 there was no need for a station in Fuhlsbüttel-Nord, as the vicinity was mainly farmland, and there were only a few buildings at the street of Langenhorner Chaussee. So the station was opened in July 1921, then as Langenhorn Süd (Langenhorn South). In the following years the station was partly used to connect the airport of Hamburg, though being a few miles away from the terminals. Therefore, on 2 October 1934 the station was renamed into Flughafen (Airport). But the airport was better connected with tram line 28, later 9, so on 1 January 1954 the station was renamed again after the street in front of the station into Flughafenstraße. On 5 August 1984 it was renamed again into Fuhlsbüttel Nord to avoid confusion, because a new shuttle service (bus line 110, Airport Express) was established from Ohlsdorf station to the airport.

In 1940 a siding track was built to turn the trains. Today it is used only on rare occasions, as in 1962 a storage siding in Ohlsdorf had been built.

== Station layout ==
The station is elevated with an island platform and two tracks. As of June 29th, 2020 it is equipped with an elevator, a raised platform for level boarding and deboarding, as well as a tactile paving for the visually impaired.

== Service ==
=== Trains ===
The Fuhlsbüttel Nord station is served by the Hamburg U-Bahn line U1. Northbound trains head towards Norderstedt Mitte, while southbound trains travel through Hamburg Central Station to Volksdorf, where the line splits into two branches: one to Ohlstedt and the other to Großhansdorf. The departures are every 5 minutes during peak hours and every 10 minutes during off-peak.

=== Bus ===
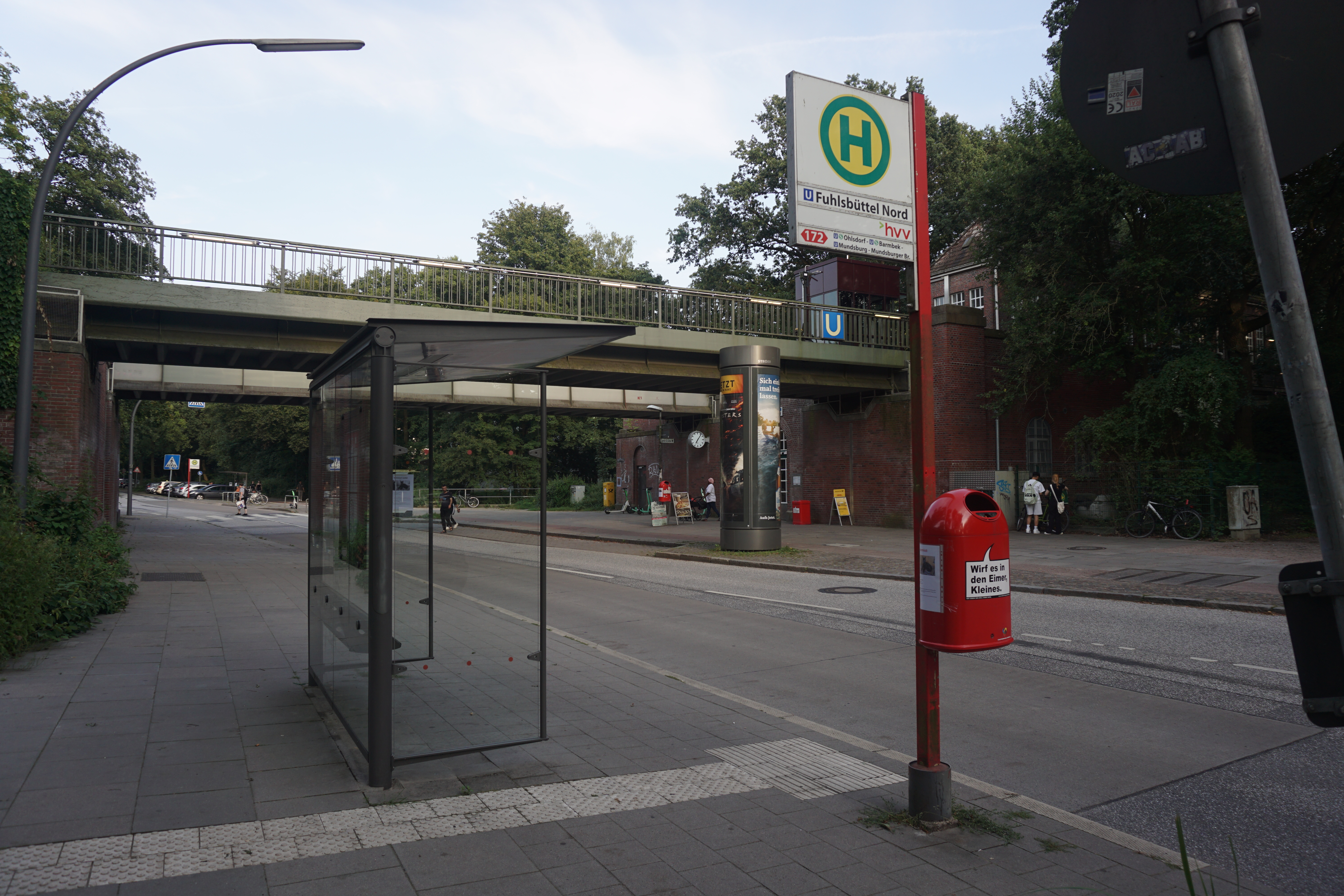
Bus stop in front of station

The bus 172 stops in front of the station, it drives in the direction of Mundsburger Brücke and Lentersweg.

The Flughafenstraße bus stop, located 100 meters from the station, is served by lines 292, 392, and the 606 night bus. The Flughafenstraße bus stop is just one stop away from Hamburg Airport.

== See also ==
- List of Hamburg U-Bahn stations
