= Kiwittsmoor station =

Railway station in Hamburg, Germany

Coordinates: 53.6749°N 10.0161°E

Kiwittsmoor
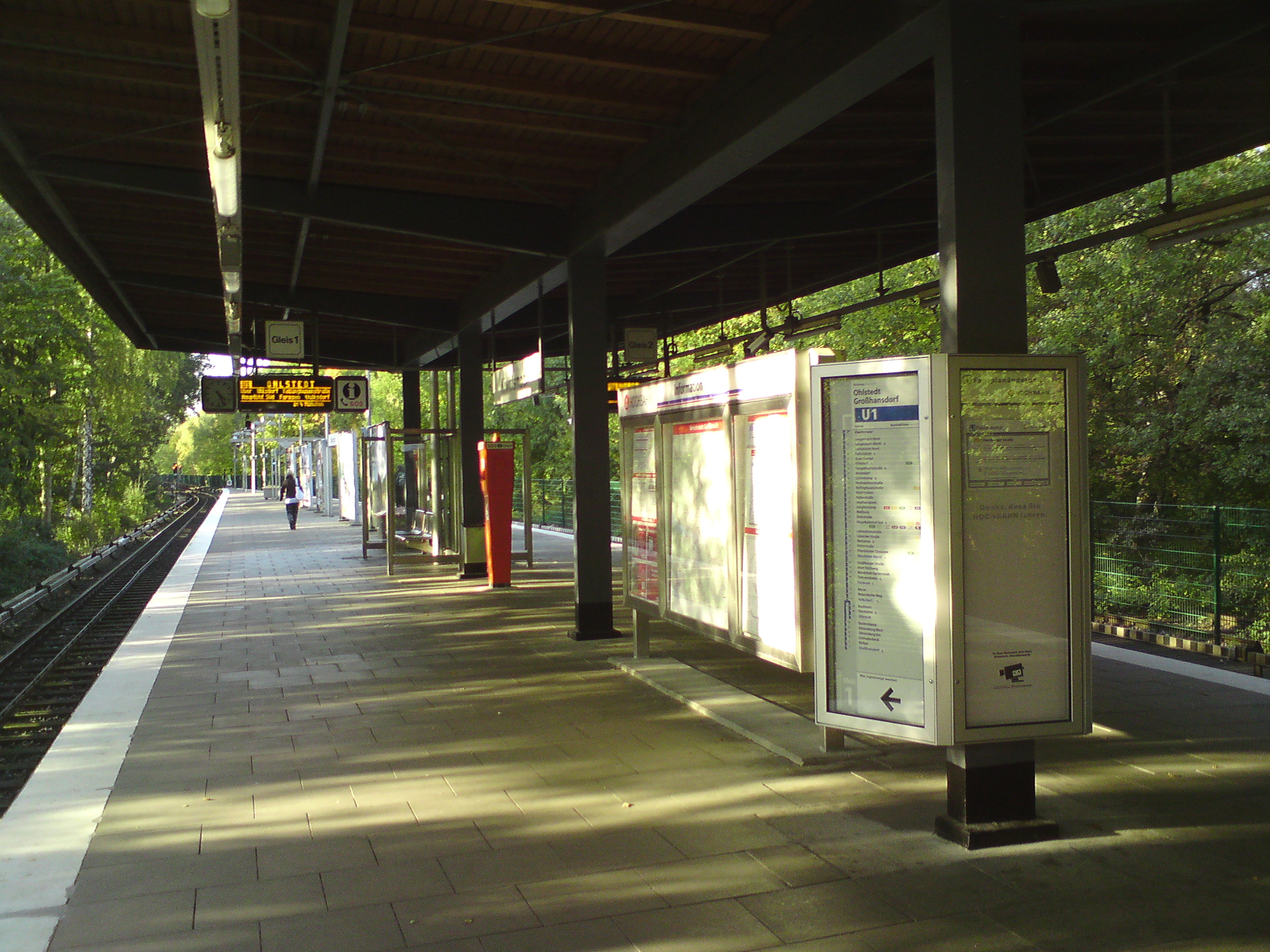

General information
- Location: Kiwittsmoor; 22419 Hamburg, Germany
- System: Hamburg U-Bahn station
- Operator: Hamburger Hochbahn AG
- Line: U1
- Platforms: 1 island platform
- Tracks: 2

Construction
- Structure type: Elevated
- Parking: 303 parking slots (temporariliy closed)
- Accessible: Yes

Other information
- Station code: HHA: KM
- Fare zone: HVV: B/303 and 304

History
- Opened: 10 May 1960; 66 years ago
- Electrified: at opening

Services
Preceding station	Hamburg U-Bahn	Following station
Ochsenzoll towards Norderstedt Mitte	U1	Langenhorn Nord towards Großhansdorf or Ohlstedt
Location

Kiwittsmoor is a station on the Hamburg U-Bahn line U1. It was opened in May 1960 and is located in Hamburg, Germany, in the quarter of Langenhorn. Langenhorn is part of the borough of Hamburg-Nord.

== History ==
The Kiwittsmoor station was subsequently added to the elevated railway line to Ochsenzoll, which had existed since the 1910s. During the construction of the railway there was no need for a station as the area was largely uninhabited. Only in the post-war years did dense settlement construction begin, which made an underground station on Kiwittsmoor seem sensible. The station was then built from 1959 and opened on May 10, 1960.

Major renovations only took place in 2013, when the station was redesigned to be barrier-free. Since then, it has had an inclined elevator from street to platform level, the platform has been partially raised and a guidance system for the visually impaired has been installed. A Park + Ride facility with 274 parking spaces has been available again since the end of 2019, but curiously it is not shown on the HVV network plan.

Extensive renovations to the entrance hall began in the summer of 2022 in order to create new areas for a signal box and kiosk areas. With the demolition of the old kiosk areas, a green roof and a green outer facade, the architectural impression changes again.

== Station layout ==
The station has an approximately 120-meter-long island platform on an embankment west of the Kiwittsmoor street in the north of Langenhorn. The only access is at the east end of the platform. Here, stairs and an inclined elevator lead down to a small access building located northeast of the subway line at street level.

Above the stairs is a glass and ceramic mosaic from 1960 created by Annette Caspar.

== Service ==
Kiwittsmoor is served by Hamburg U-Bahn line U1; departures are every 5 minutes, every 10 minutes in non-busy periods.

There are no bus lines here, and there are no plans to create or relocate a bus line here. If a bus stop is required due to rail replacement traffic, a bus stop sign is already in place.

== See also ==
- List of Hamburg U-Bahn stations
