= Farmsen station =

Railway station in Hamburg, Germany

Farmsen
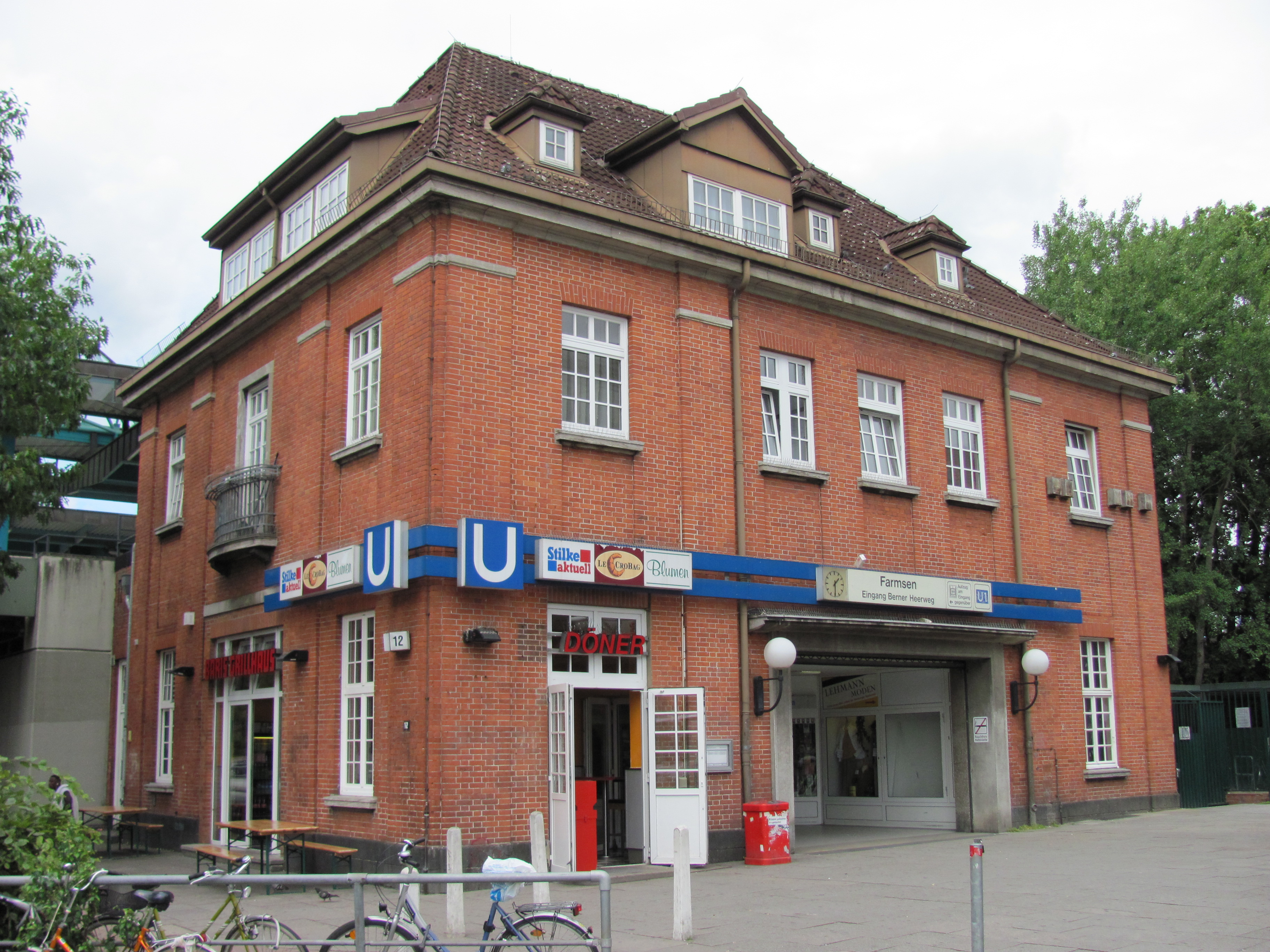

General information
- Location: August-Krogmann-Strasse; 22159 Hamburg, Germany
- Coordinates: 53.6072°N 10.1178°E
- System: Hamburg U-Bahn station
- Operator: Hamburger Hochbahn AG
- Line: U1
- Platforms: 2 island platforms
- Tracks: 4

Construction
- Structure type: Elevated
- Accessible: Yes

Other information
- Station code: HHA: FA
- Fare zone: HVV: A and B/204, 205, 304, and 305

History
- Opened: 12 September 1918; 107 years ago
- Closed: 22 May 1919 - 6 September 1920
- Electrified: 6 September 1920; 105 years ago

Services
Preceding station	Hamburg U-Bahn	Following station
Trabrennbahn towards Norderstedt Mitte	U1	Oldenfelde towards Großhansdorf or Ohlstedt
Location

Farmsen is a rapid transit station located in the Hamburg quarter of Farmsen-Berne, Germany. The station was opened in 1918 and is served by Hamburg U-Bahn line U1.

== History ==
The station was constructed from 1912 to 1914 and opened on 12 September 1918 on the Walddörfer railway line. The village of Farmsen had been an exclave of Hamburg territory, so a stop was planned here. The station was served by steam trains until 20 September 1919 and re-opened after electrification of one track on 6 September 1920 which allowed a train stop every two hours. But only after a second electrified track had been opened on 13 May 1921, more frequent services could be offered. On 20 May 1923 the second track was completed to Volksdorf.

From 1962 to 1964 a 1,000m long railway repair workshop (Betriebswerkstatt) was built in Farmsen which was needed for the then completed U1 line. At the same time a second platform with two tracks was constructed at Farmsen station along with a new entrance from the west, where a stele by well-known sculptor Horst Janssen was erected. An entrance from the bus stop south of the station was missing until the station was fully renovated in 1996. Also a lift was added then.

== Service ==
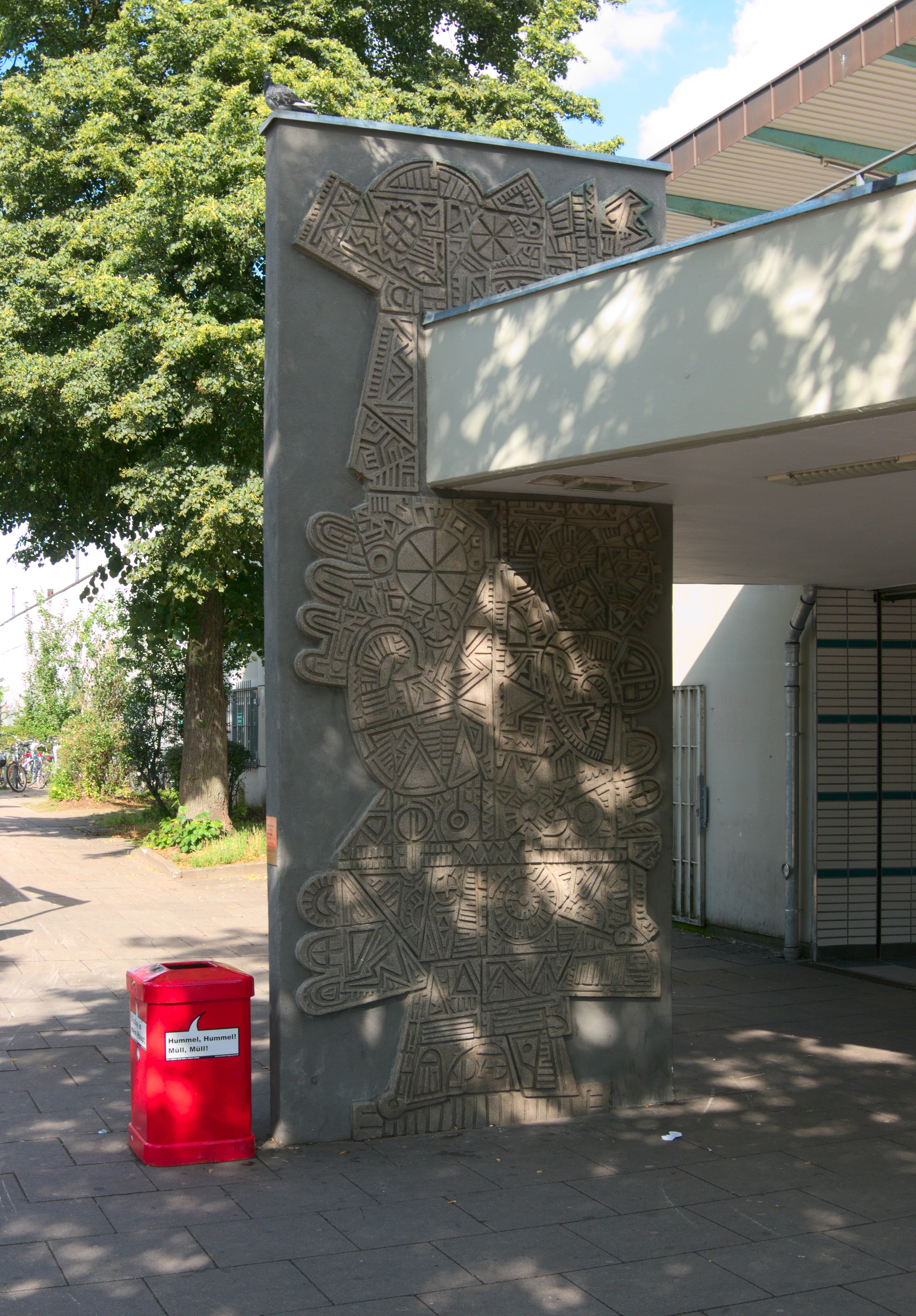
Stele by Horst Janssen at the western entrance

=== Trains ===
Farmsen is served by Hamburg U-Bahn line U1; departures are every 5 minutes. The travel time to Hamburg Hauptbahnhof takes about 21 minutes.

== See also ==
- List of Hamburg U-Bahn stations
