= Garstedt station =

Underground rapid transit station in Germany

Coordinates: 53.6844°N 9.9861°E

Garstedt
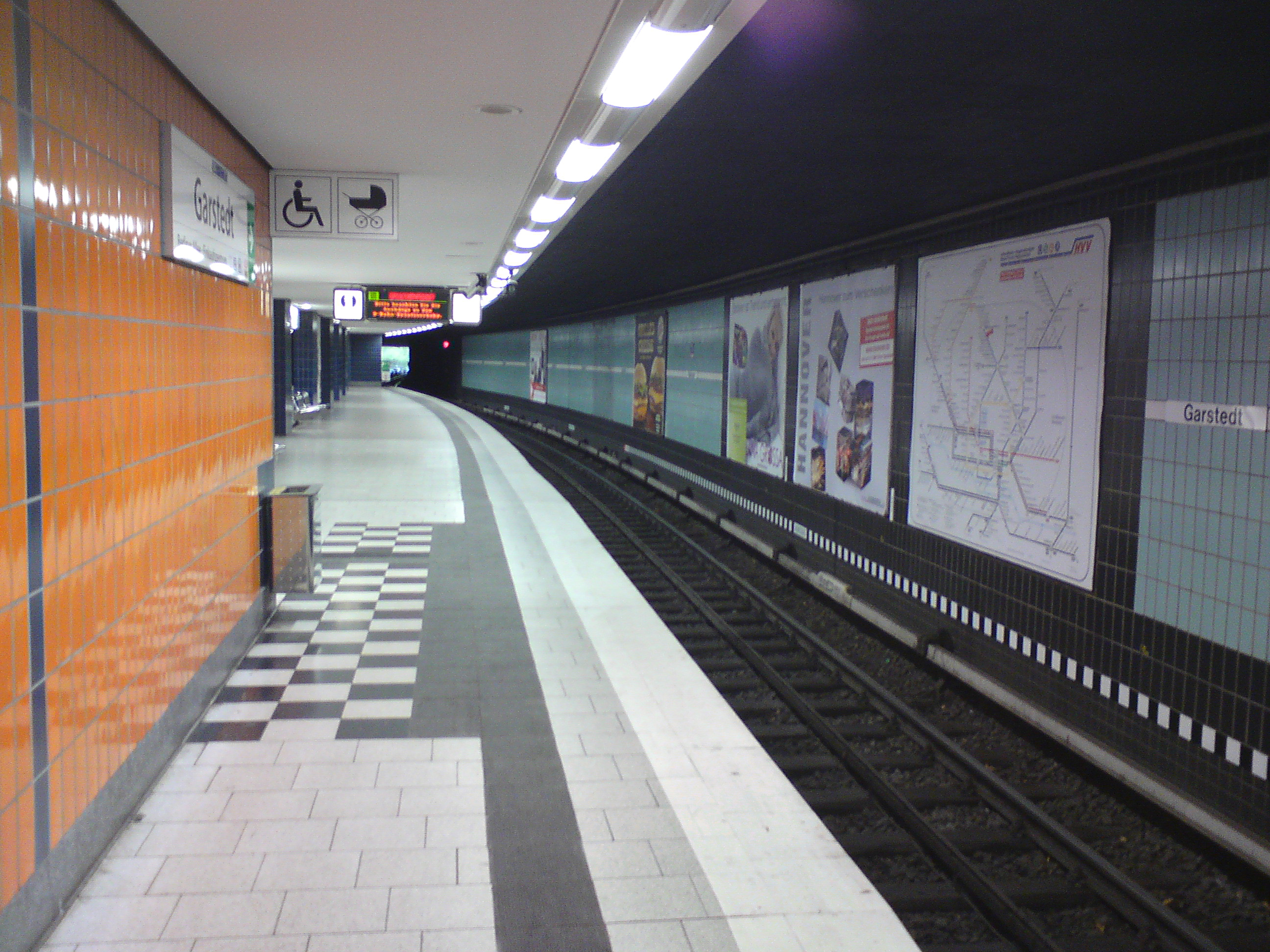

General information
- Location: Berliner Allee; 22850 Norderstedt, Germany
- System: Hamburg U-Bahn station
- Operator: Hamburger Hochbahn AG
- Line: U1
- Platforms: 1 island platform
- Tracks: 2
- Connections: Bus

Construction
- Structure type: Underground
- Accessible: Yes

Other information
- Station code: HHA: GA
- Fare zone: HVV: B/403

History
- Opened: 1 June 1969

Services
Preceding station	Hamburg U-Bahn	Following station
Richtweg towards Norderstedt Mitte	U1	Ochsenzoll towards Großhansdorf or Ohlstedt
Location

Garstedt is an underground station on the Hamburg U-Bahn line U 1. It was opened in June 1969 and is located in Norderstedt, Germany, in the borough of Garstedt, which was an independent municipality to the end of 1969.

== History ==
Construction works for the station began in 1967, and it was opened in June 1969, after U-Bahn tracks of the Langenhorn railway had been extended to Garstedt. This was done in accordance with an agreement between the city of Hamburg and the former Garstedt municipality. Hamburg consented to expand the underground line to Garstedt, after it was allowed to expand the northern runway of Hamburg Airport onto Garstedt territory. The Alster Northern Railway (Alsternordbahn, ANB), which serviced the line to its southern terminus Ochsenzoll before, was shortened, first to former halt of Birkenweg, later to a newly constructed at-grade station at Garstedt. The train service at Garstedt U-Bahn station started on one track, the second was completed on 14 December 1969.

The station was originally planned in a terrain cutting, but the city decided to build the shopping centre "Herold Center" just east of the station, which was completed in 1970. In the 2000s the station entrance was re-built, the station square was partly roofed with a glass construction including new shopping arcades.

1969–1996 there was only a crossover for the trains south of the station. A storage siding in the north was added, as the line was extended to Norderstedt Mitte station in the mid-1990s. This completed in 1996, the ANB terminus in Garstedt was closed and dismantled.

== Station layout ==
Garstedt is an underground station with an island platform and two tracks. First the station had two staircases, each with an escalator. The southern escalator was later replaced with an ((inclined elevator)). The station is so fully accessible for handicapped persons. There are several indoor parking facilities (Park and ride) and some bicycle facilities.

A train reversing facility is located north of the station.

== Service ==
Garstedt is served by Hamburg U-Bahn line U 1; departures are every 5 minutes, every 10 minutes in non-busy periods. The bus station just west of the underground station is served by HVV bus lines 178, 278, 191, 193, 494, and 295.

== See also ==
- List of Hamburg U-Bahn stations
