= Farmsen-Berne =

- Quarter of Hamburg
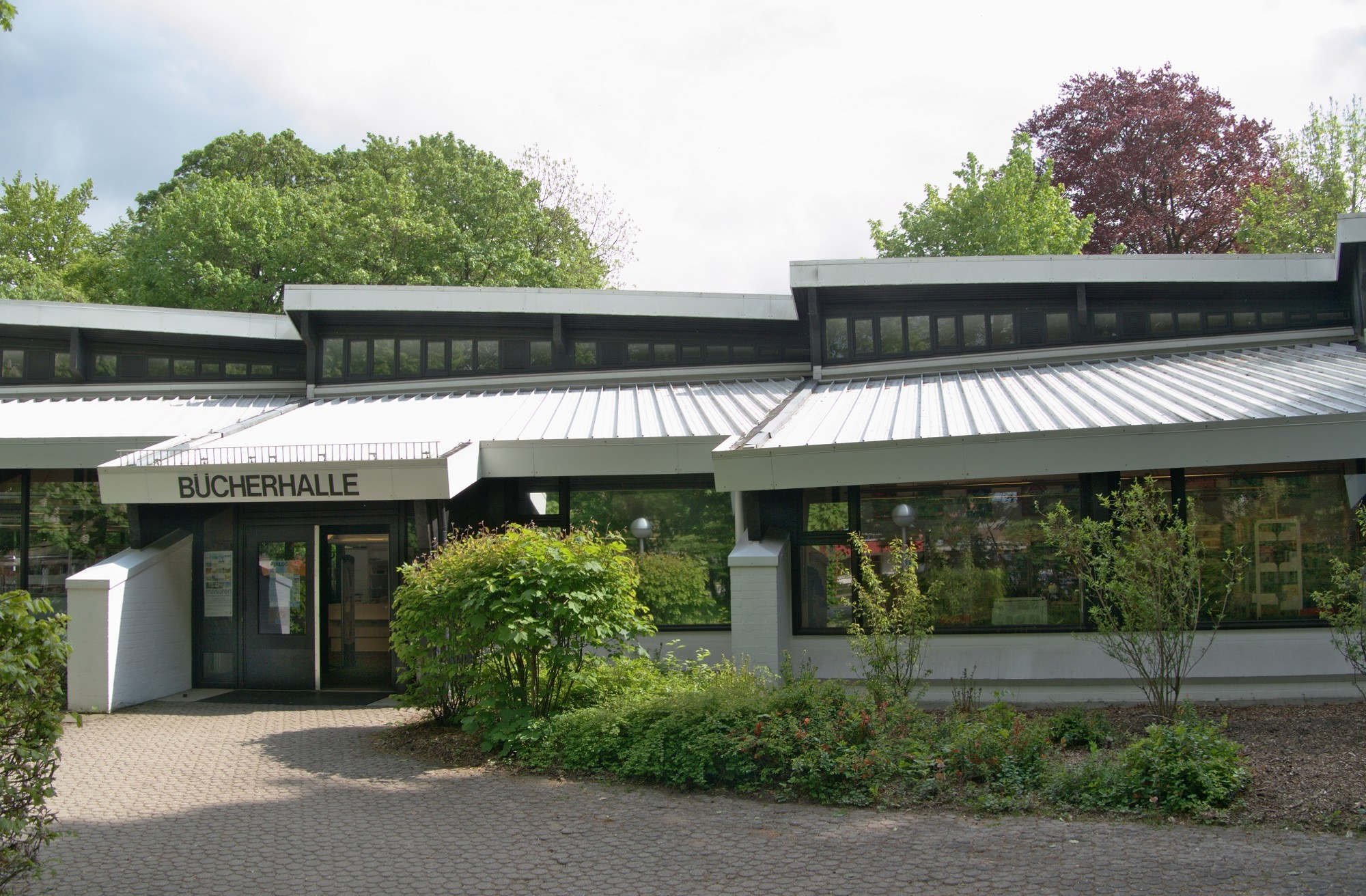
- Library Farmsen

- Location of Farmsen-Berne in Hamburg
- Interactive map of Farmsen-Berne
- Location within Germany Location within Hamburg
- Coordinates: 53.606389°N 10.119722°E
- Country: Germany
- State: Hamburg
- City: Hamburg
- Borough: Hamburg-Wandsbek

Area
  - Total: 8.3 km^{2} (3.2 sq mi)

Population (2024-12-31)
  - Total: 39,266
  - Density: 4,700/km^{2} (12,000/sq mi)
- Time zone: UTC+01:00 (CET)
  - Summer (DST): UTC+02:00 (CEST)
- Dialling codes: 040
- Vehicle registration: HH

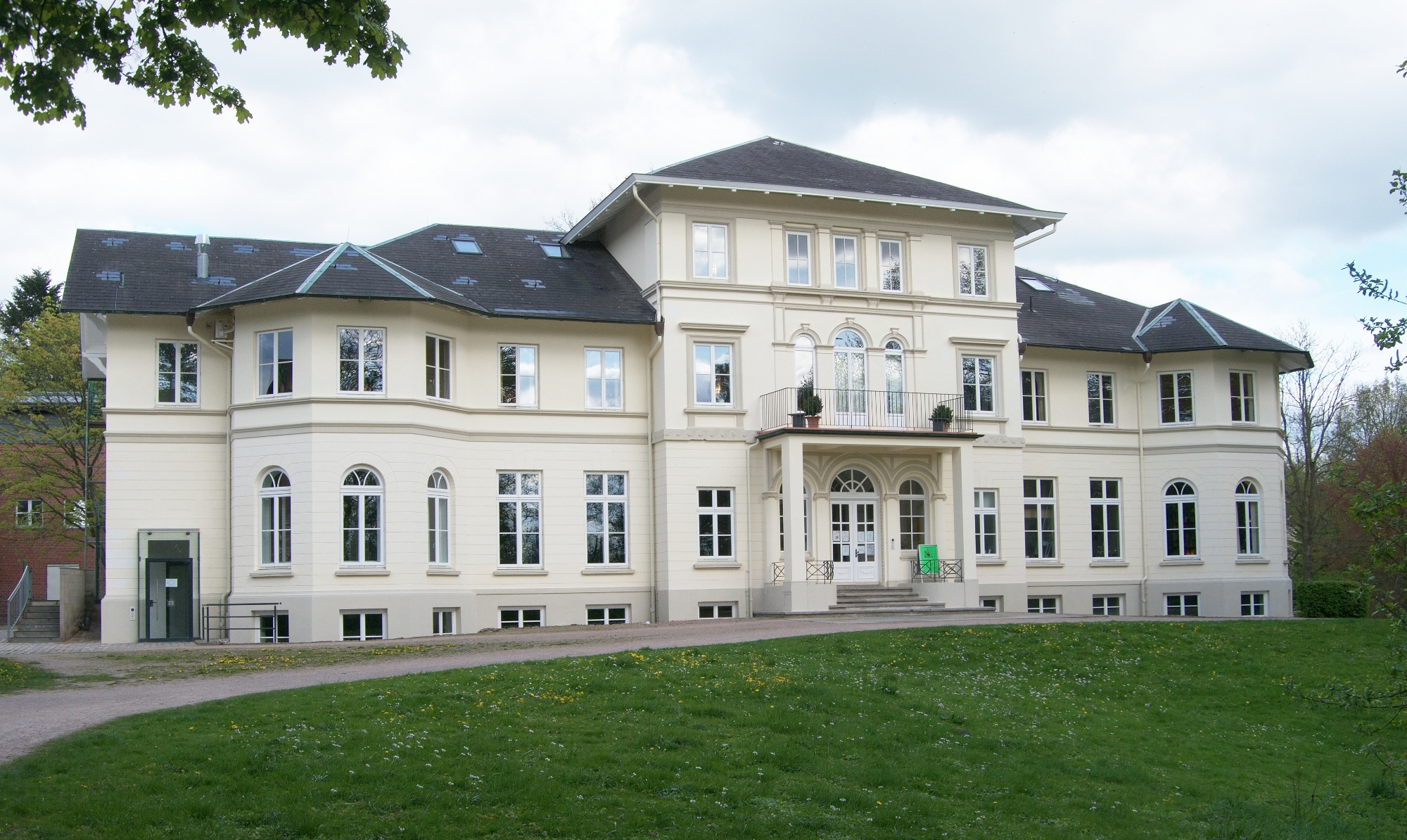
Berne manor house, built in 1890

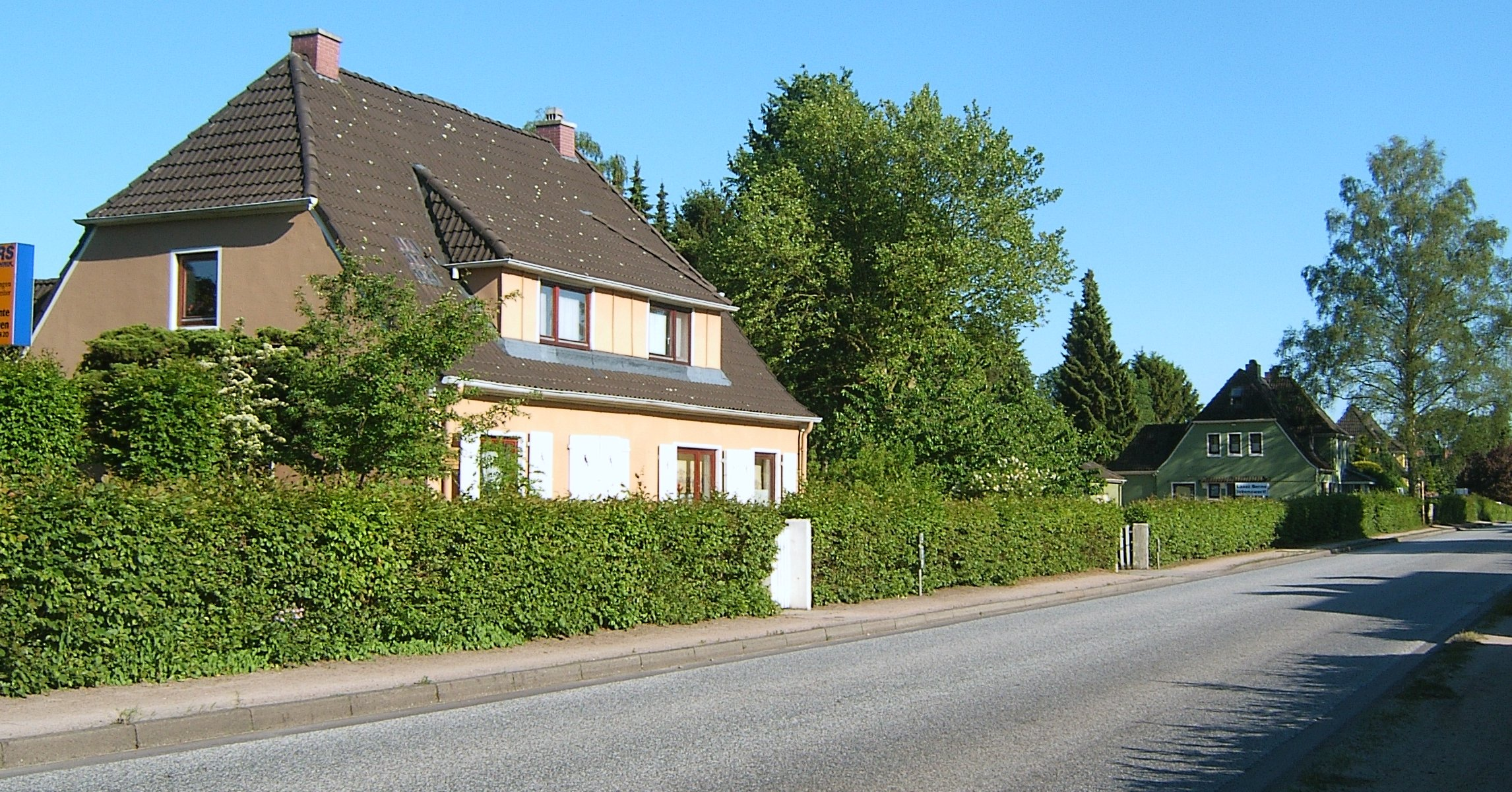
Residential houses in Gartenstadt (lit. garden city) Berne

Farmsen-Berne is a quarter of Hamburg, Germany, in the borough of Wandsbek. More than 34,000 inhabitants live in an area of 8.3 km^{2}. Farmsen (German pronunciation: [ˈfaʁmzn̩]) and Berne (German pronunciation: [ˈbɛʁnə]) are part of the area of Walddörfer (lit. forest villages).

== Geography ==
Farmsen-Berne borders the quarters of Rahlstedt, Tonndorf, Wandsbek, Bramfeld, Sasel, and Volksdorf. The stream of Berner Au flows through Farmsen-Berne and, behind the pond of Kupfermühlenteich, into Wandse river.

== History ==
In 1296, the former villages of Farmsen and Berne were first mentioned. Farmsen was then called Vermerschen, deriving of Fridumareshusen or Fridumaresheim, founded by a Franconian settler named Fridumar. The name Berne has its origin in Baren, meaning a small stream - Berner Au in this case. Farmsen-Berne was an exclave of Hamburg in Prussian territory. In 1937, the villages were incorporated into Hamburg by the Greater Hamburg Act, which came into force in 1938.

== Politics ==
These are the results of Farmsen-Berne in the Hamburg state election:

	SPD	Greens	CDU	AfD	Left	FDP	Others
2020	47,0 %	17,7 %	9,6 %	8,2 %	7,5 %	3,7 %	6,3 %
2015	54,2 %	7,4 %	13,4 %	8,2 %	7,2 %	5,7 %	3,9 %
2011	55,8 %	7,6 %	19,9 %	–	6,1 %	5,1 %	5,5 %
2008	37,0 %	6,5 %	42,3 %	–	7,1 %	3,8 %	3,3 %
2004	35,7 %	8,2 %	45,5 %	–	–	2,8 %	7,9 %
2001	39,6 %	5,3 %	24,5 %	–	0,2 %	4,3 %	26,1 %

== Transportation ==
Hamburg U-Bahn line U1, the former Walddörfer railway, was built since 1912 in the area and has three stops in Farmsen-Berne: Trabrennbahn, Farmsen, Oldenfelde and Berne, of which Farmsen station is the largest. It has four tracks, and a railway repair workshop is located here.
