= Hamburg U-Bahn Type DT5 =

German U-Bahn train type operated in Hamburg

HHA-Baureihe DT5
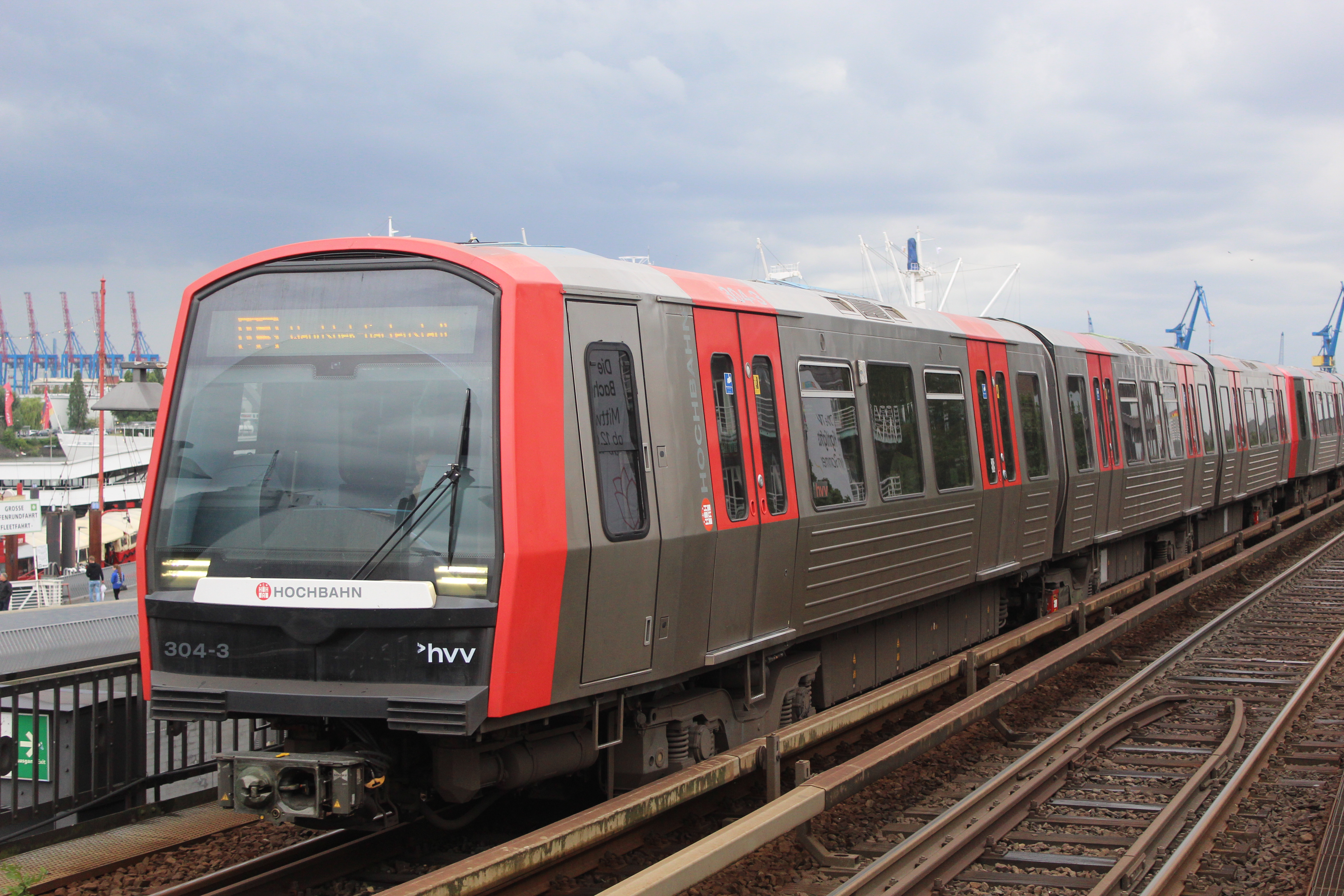
- DT5 304 arriving at Baumwall station, July 2023
- Manufacturers: Alstom & Bombardier
- Built at: Salzgitter
- Replaced: Type DT3
- Constructed: 2008-2022
- Number built: 163 vehicles
- Formation: 3 cars per trainset
- Capacity: 336 (96 seated)
- Operator: Hamburger Hochbahn AG

Specifications
- Car body construction: Stainless steel
- Train length: 39,600 mm (129 ft 11 in)
- Width: 2,600 mm (8 ft 6 in)
- Doors: 2 pairs per side
- Maximum speed: 80 km/h (50 mph)
- Weight: 54,6 t
- Traction system: Bombardier MITRAC IGBT–VVVF
- Power output: 135 kW x 6
- Electric system: 750 V DC, 3rd rail
- Current collection: contact shoe
- Braking systems: Disc brake, regenerative brake
- Track gauge: 1,435 mm (4 ft 8 1/2 in)

The Type DT5 is an electric multiple unit (EMU) train type operated by the Hamburger Hochbahn AG on the Hamburg U-Bahn system. It is the first type of rolling stock on the Hamburg U-Bahn that has air conditioning and gangways between the individual cars.

== Formation ==
Every DT5 train consists of three permanently-coupled cars. The cars are connected with gangways, allowing passengers to walk into the adjacent cars. Up to three units can be coupled together.

== Interior ==
The interior consists of red upholstered seating, and spaces for wheelchairs and prams. The trains have displays which show the names of the next four stations, and CCTV cameras. The interior is air conditioned.

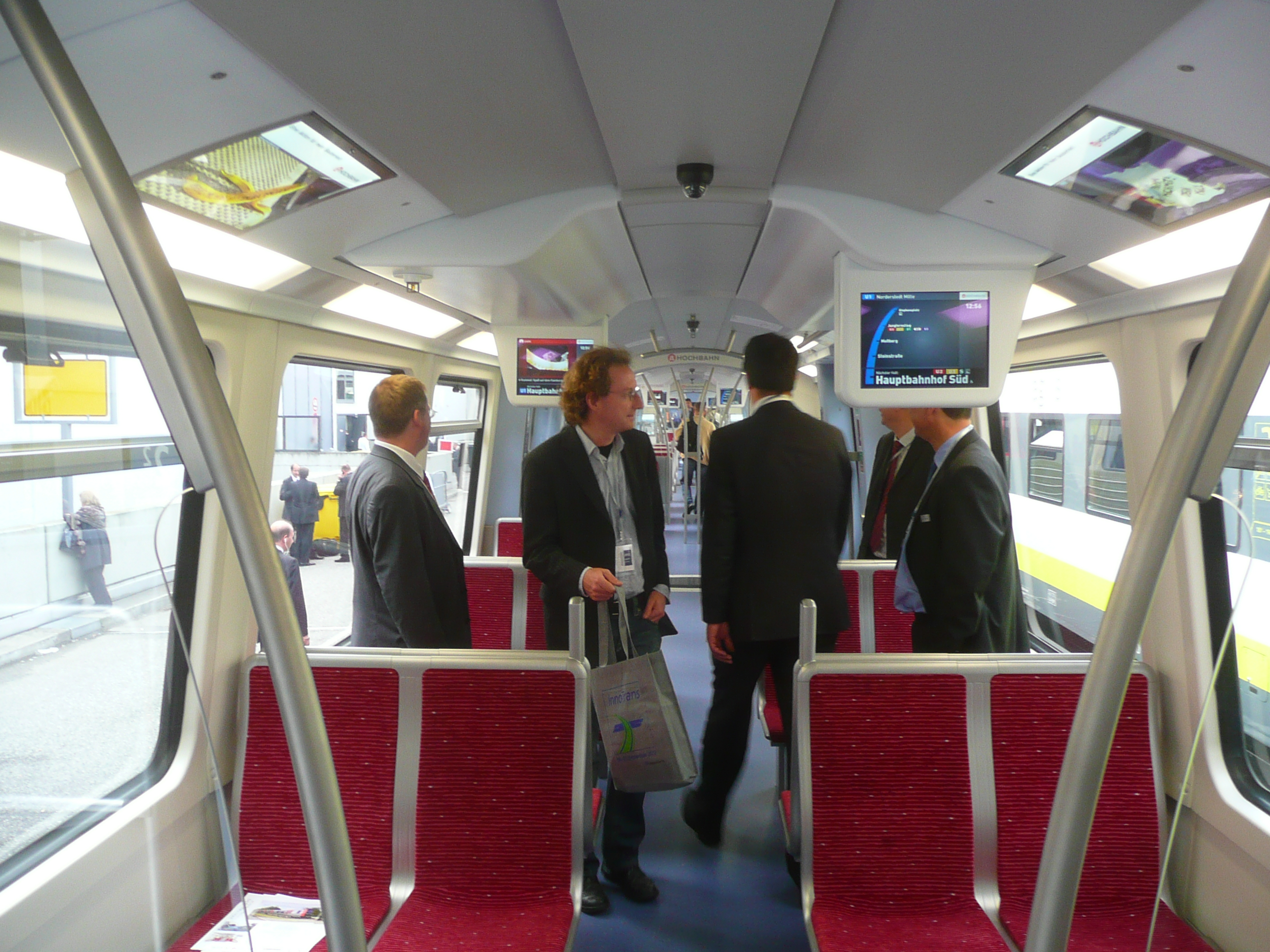
Interior view at InnoTrans 2010

== Technical specifications ==
The train is built to an articulated design, with the two end cars only having one bogie, while the center car has two bogies. The car bodies are made out of stainless steel, and the trains are powered by three-phase motors. In order to save weight, the DT5 trains use aluminium brake discs, which make a loud squealing sound while braking.

== History ==
A European-Union–wide tender for the construction of the DT5 trains began in 2005. Siemens, Stadler, Rotem and a consortium of Alstom and Bombardier bid for the contract. The trains were ordered in December 2006 from the consortium of Alstom and Bombardier at a cost of €240 million. The first unit was delivered to the Barmbek depot on December 1, 2011. Further DT5 trains were ordered in 2016, 2018 and 2019 bringing the total number of trains built to 163.

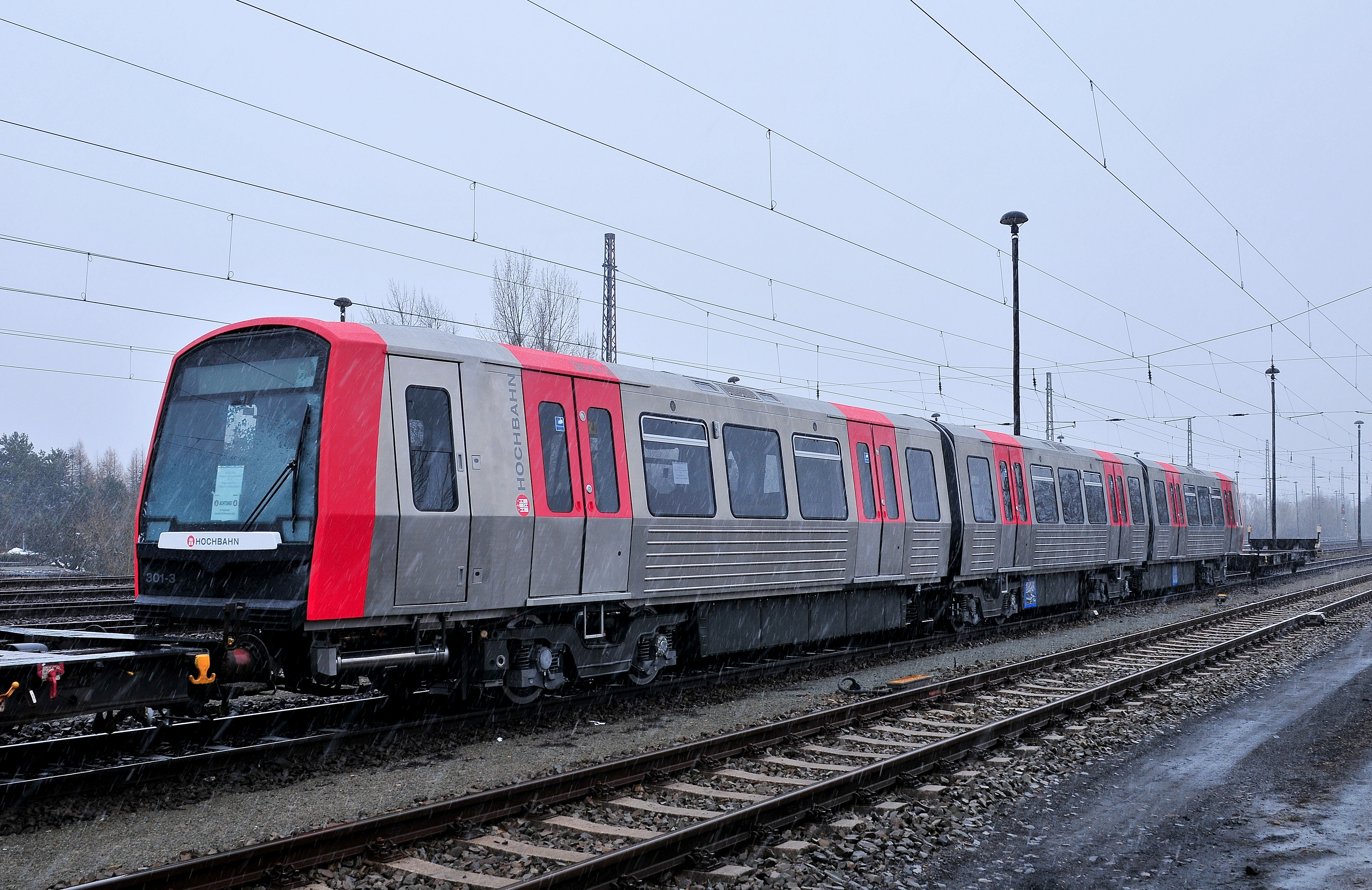
A DT5 train on delivery to the Hennigsdorf testing facility in March 2010
