= Ochsenzoll station =

Railway station in Hamburg, Germany

Coordinates: 53.6781°N 10.0014°E

Ochsenzoll
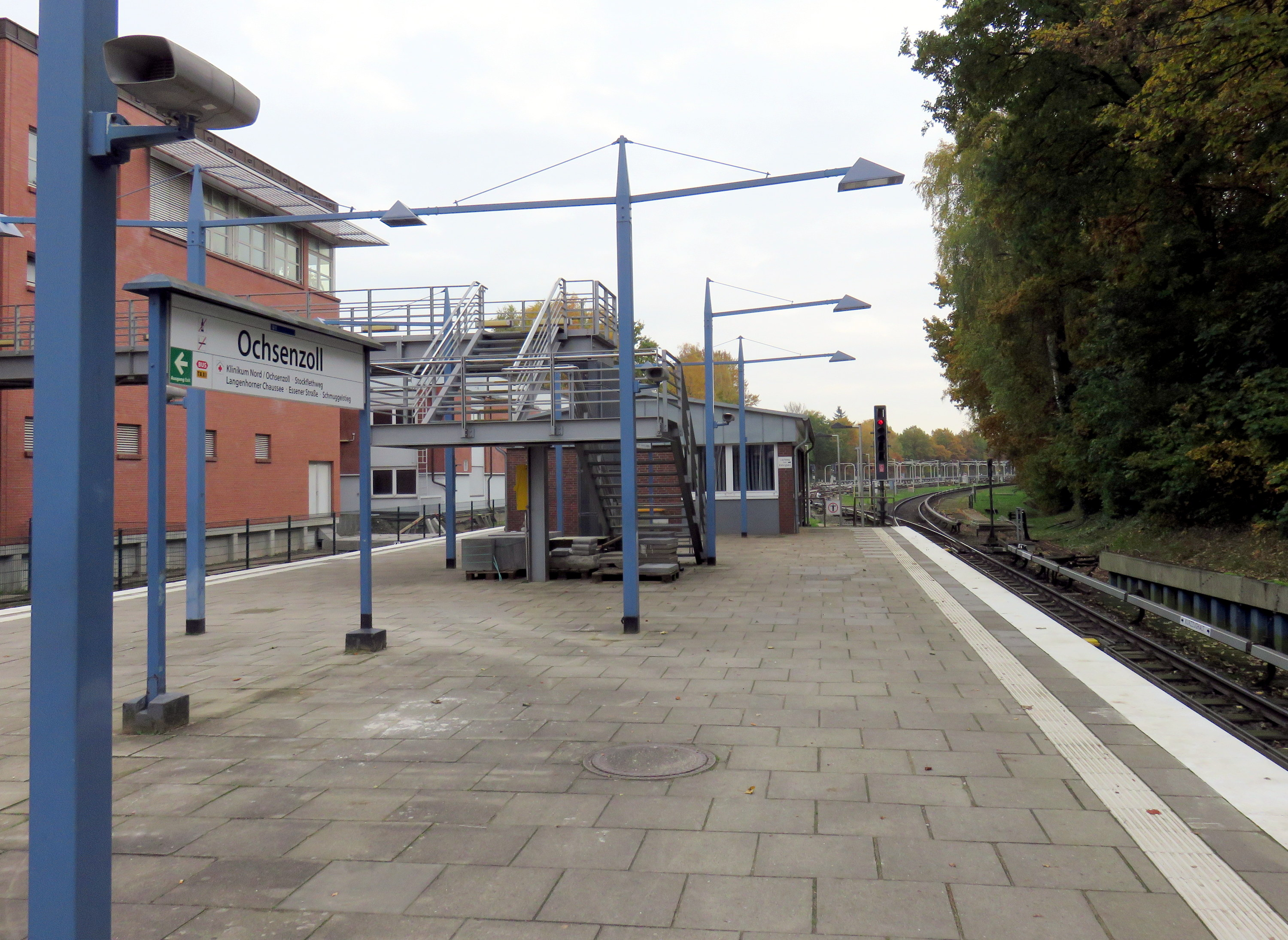
- Platforms, eastern train depot and railway line control center (left) at Ochsenzoll station

General information
- Location: Langenhorner Chaussee; 22419 Hamburg, Germany
- System: Hamburg U-Bahn station
- Operator: Hamburger Hochbahn AG
- Line: U1
- Platforms: 1 island platform
- Tracks: 2
- Connections: Bus

Construction
- Structure type: Terrain cutting
- Accessible: Yes

Other information
- Station code: HHA: OZ
- Fare zone: HVV: B/303, 304, 403, and 404

History
- Opened: 1 July 1921

Services
Preceding station	Hamburg U-Bahn	Following station
Garstedt towards Norderstedt Mitte	U1	Kiwittsmoor towards Großhansdorf or Ohlstedt
Location

Ochsenzoll is a station on the Hamburg U-Bahn line U1. Until 1969, it was the north western terminus of the line. It was opened in July 1921 and is located in Hamburg, Germany, in the quarter of Langenhorn. Langenhorn is part of the borough of Hamburg-Nord.

== History ==
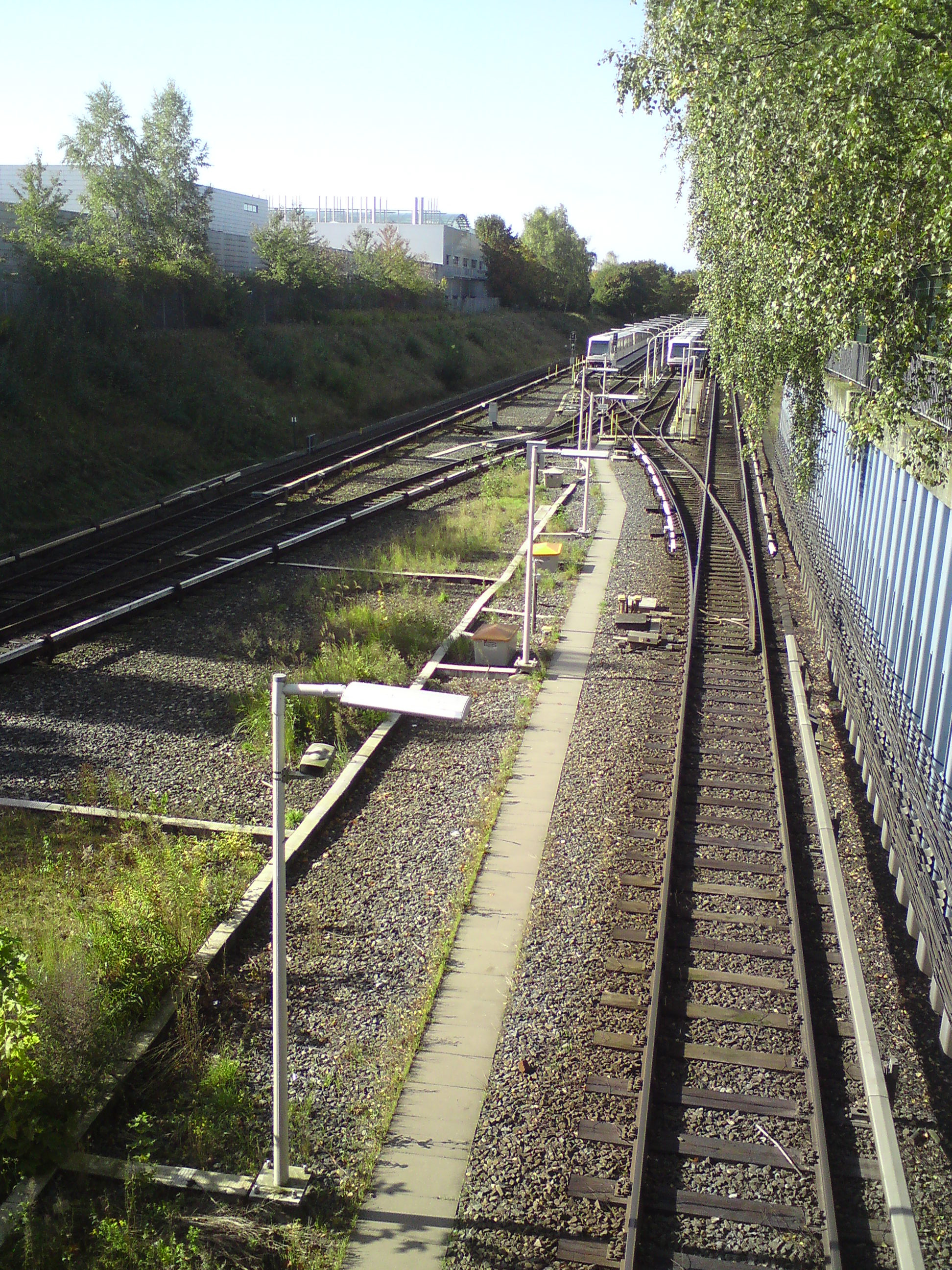
Western train depot; the ANB station was located above the sheet pile wall on the right.

The station was opened in July 1921, after the Langenhorn railway was in preliminary operation with steam trains since 5 January 1918. At that time there was a preliminary passenger platform at the freight yard, which was located north of the U-Bahn station. After 1921 one U-Bahn train per hour left Ochsenzoll to Ohlsdorf station, two during rush hours.

On 5 May 1953 the Alster Northern Railway (Alsternordbahn, ANB), the first new railway line in the Federal Republic of Germany, opened from Ochsenzoll in northern direction to Ulzburg Süd station. Today it is part of the AKN network. The ANB station was an at-grade station, located north of today's western train depot of the station, on the western side of the street of Langenhorner Chaussee.

In 1962, the U-Bahn company Hamburger Hochbahn decided to build a new Ochsenzoll station, which was needed for an extension of the line to the Norderstedt borough of Garstedt on Schleswig-Holstein territory. In 1963 the old entrance building of the station was demolished, underpasses for the U-Bahn tracks and also a pedestrian subway were built under Langenhorner Chaussee, and also the western train depot was constructed. In 1964 the aforementioned construction works were completed. Since 1967 the U-Bahn tracks were extended to Garstedt station, the new station was opened in 1969.

From March to September 2015 a lift was constructed at the station's entrance, and the platform was partly elevated to allow an easier access for handicapped people. On the compound of the freight yard, which had been closed in 1991 and the tracks removed at the end of the 2000s, a car dealer expanded its facilities, including a shopping mall and a car park. The car park was originally planned as a Park and Ride facility, but due to protests and legal proceedings of residents of nearby street of Stockflethweg the car dealer company decided to use it only as a car park for their offered cars. A further Park and Ride facility is projected.

== Station layout ==
Ochsenzoll is located in a terrain cutting with an island platform and two tracks. The station is fully accessible for handicapped persons, as there is a lift. There are only few parking slots and some bicycle facilities.

There are two train depots, one to the west and one to the east of the station. Also there is a railway line control center (Streckenzentrale) of the Hamburger Hochbahn near the station.

== Service ==
Ochsenzoll is served by Hamburg U-Bahn line U1; departures are every 5 minutes, every 10 minutes in non-busy periods. Bus lines 278, 292, 7550, 7551, and night bus line 606 serve the station.

== See also ==
- List of Hamburg U-Bahn stations
