= U1 (Hamburg U-Bahn) =

Rapid transit line in Hamburg, Germany

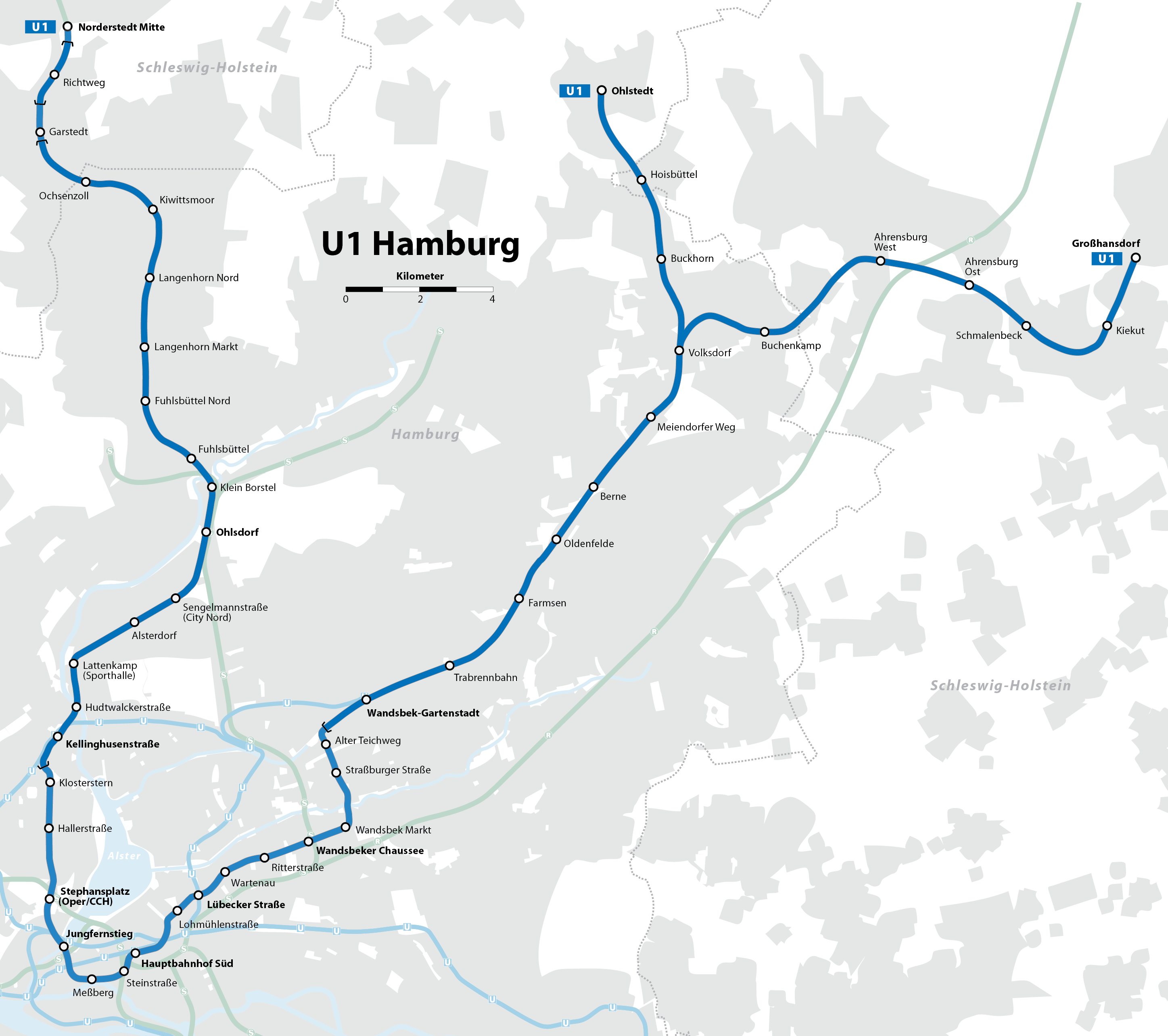

Overview
- Stations: 47
- Colour on map: Blue

Service
- Type: Rapid transit
- System: Hamburg U-Bahn
- Operator: Hamburger Hochbahn
- Rolling stock: DT4, DT5

History
- Opened: 1 December 1914; 111 years ago
- Last extension: 1996

Technical
- Line length: 55.383 km (34.413 mi)
- Track gauge: 4 ft 8 1/2 in (1,435 mm)
- Electrification: Bottom Contact 3rd Rail - 750v DC
- Operating speed: 80 km/h (50 mph)

The U1 is a line of the Hamburg U-Bahn which has a length of 55.383 kilometres (34.41 mi). It starts in Norderstedt Mitte and leads via the city center at Jungfernstieg and Hauptbahnhof Süd to Volksdorf where it divides in two branches, leading to Ohlstedt and Großhansdorf and serves 47 stations.

== History ==
The first part of the line was opened on 1 December 1914 from Kellinghusenstraße to Ohlsdorf with electric service. In 1920, the new branch from Wandsbek-Gartenstadt (Walddörfer railway) to Volksdorf opened; the two branches from here to Großhansdorf and to Ohlstedt followed in 1921 and 1925. Also in 1921, the Langenhorn railway to Ochsenzoll was established. On this line, there had been a preliminary service with steam trains since 1918.

On 2 June 1929 the first part and on 25 March 1931 the second part of the KellJung line to Jungfernstieg was added. From 1960 to 1963 the line was built through the city center to Wandsbek-Gartenstadt, which completed the U1 line, connecting the branch to Volksdorf. In 1969 the Langenhorn railway was extended to Garstedt and in 1996 to Norderstedt Mitte.

== Opening dates ==
- 1 December 1914: Kellinghusenstraße − Ohlsdorf
- 12 September 1918 - 22 May 1919 (powered by steam); 6 September 1920 (powered by electricity): Wandsbek-Gartenstadt – Volksdorf (Walddörfer railway, Walddörferbahn)
- 1 July 1921: Ohlsdorf − Ochsenzoll (Langenhorn railway)
- 5 November 1921: Volksdorf − Großhansdorf (then: Groß Hansdorf) (Walddörferbahn)
- 1 February 1925: Volksdorf − Ohlstedt (Walddörferbahn)
- 2 June 1929: Kellinghusenstraße − Stephansplatz (KellJung line)
- 25 March 1931: Stephansplatz − Jungfernstieg
- 22 February 1960: Jungfernstieg − Meßberg
- 2 October 1960: Meßberg − Hauptbahnhof Süd (then: Hauptbahnhof)
- 2 July 1961: Hauptbahnhof Süd (then: Hauptbahnhof) − Lübecker Straße
- 1 October 1961: Lübecker Straße − Wartenau
- 28 October 1962: Wartenau − Wandsbek Markt
- 3 March 1963: Wandsbek Markt − Straßburger Straße
- 4 August 1963: Straßburger Straße − Wandsbek-Gartenstadt
- 1 June 1969: Ochsenzoll − Garstedt
- 28 September 1996: Garstedt − Norderstedt Mitte

== Gallery ==
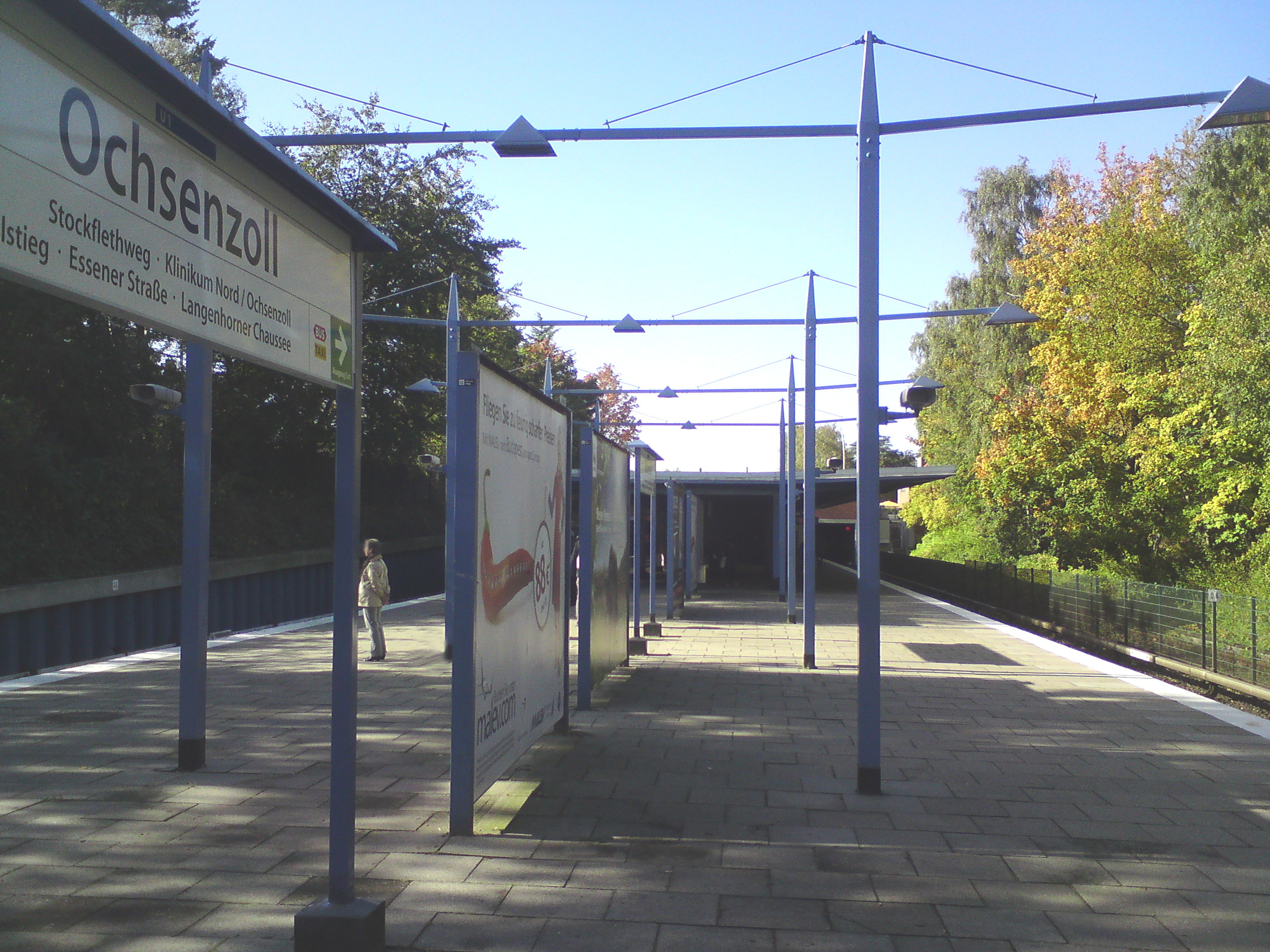
Ochsenzoll

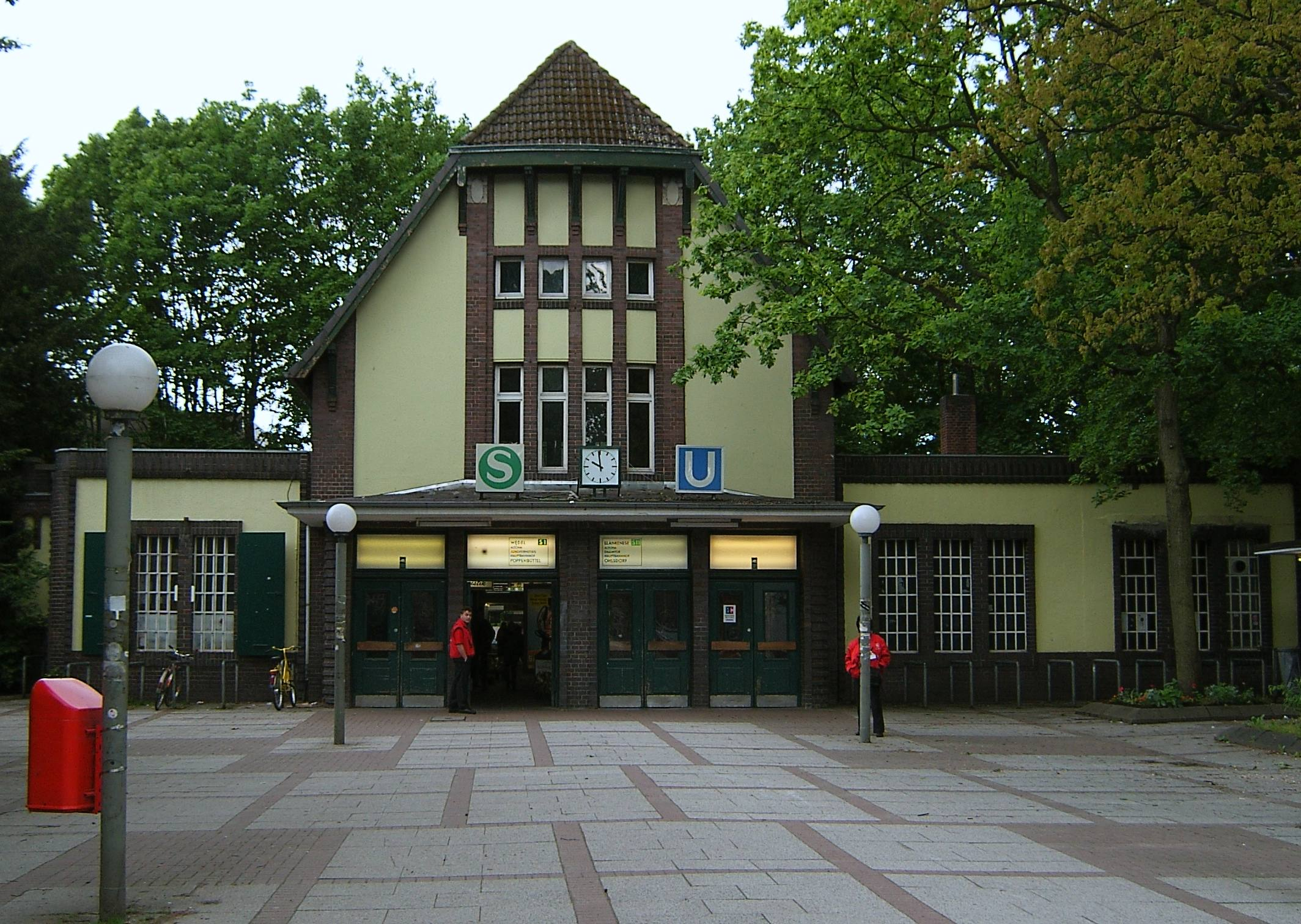
Ohlsdorf

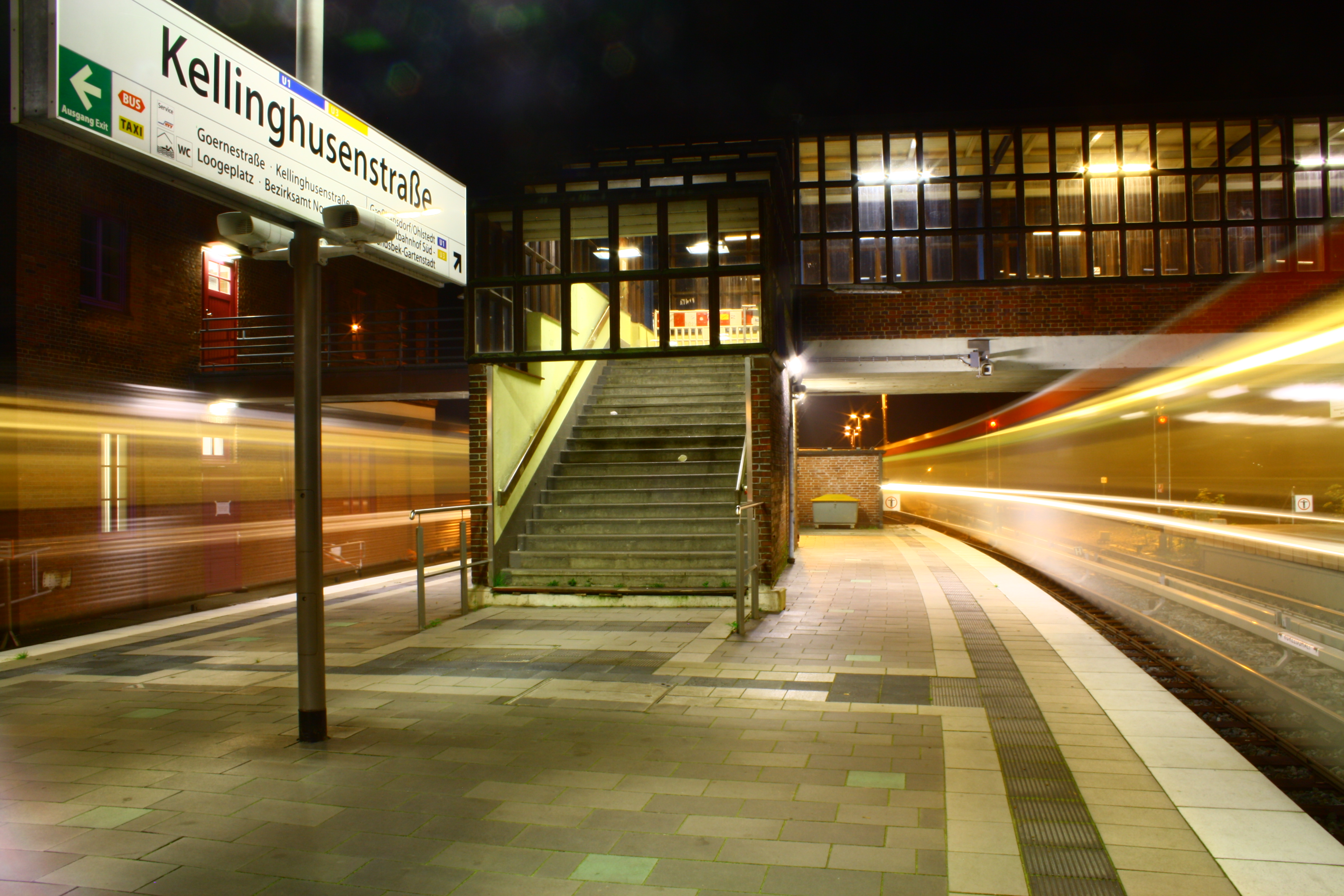
Kellinghusenstraße

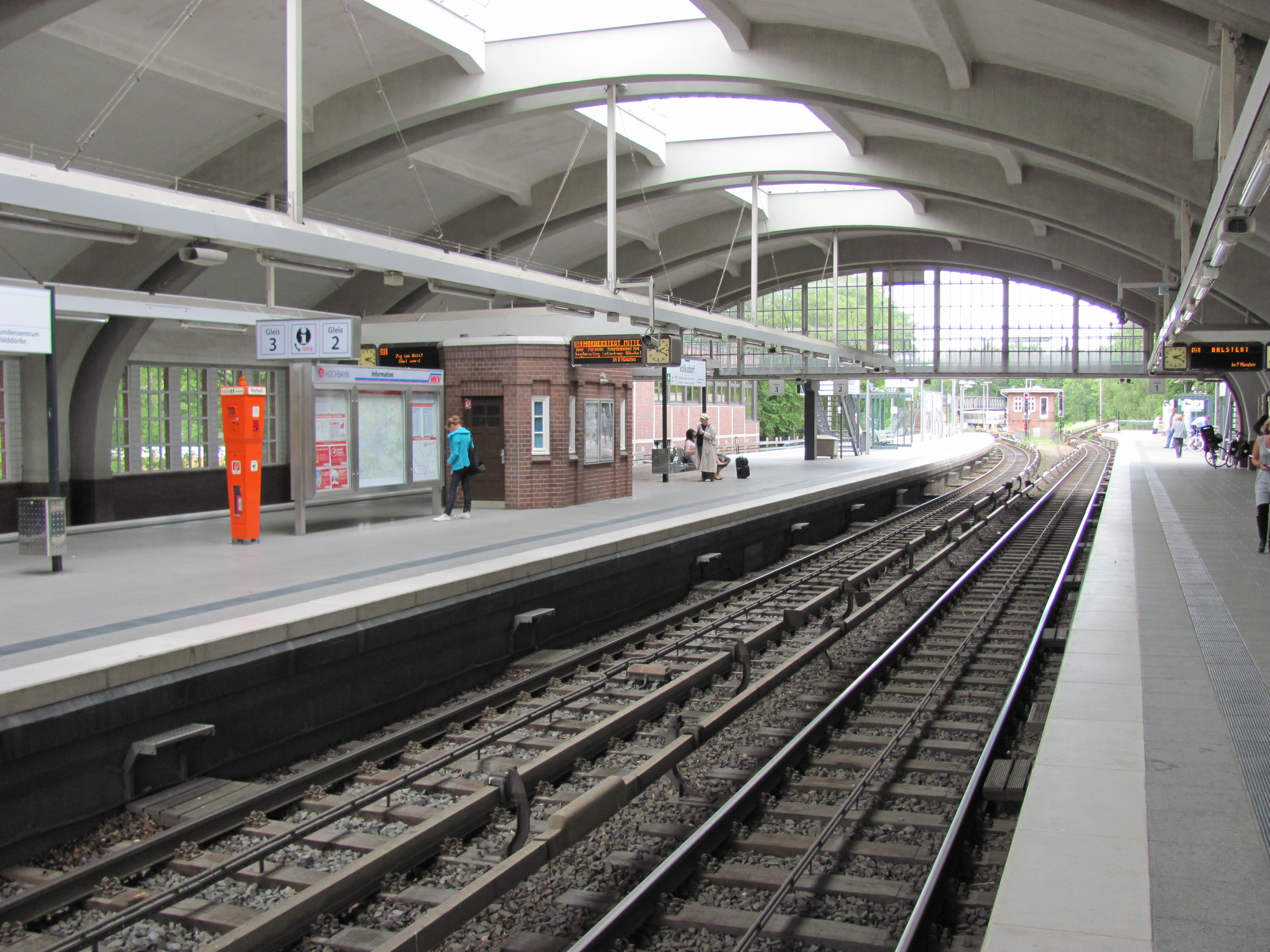
Volksdorf
