= Christuskirche station =

Railway station in Hamburg, Germany

Christuskirche
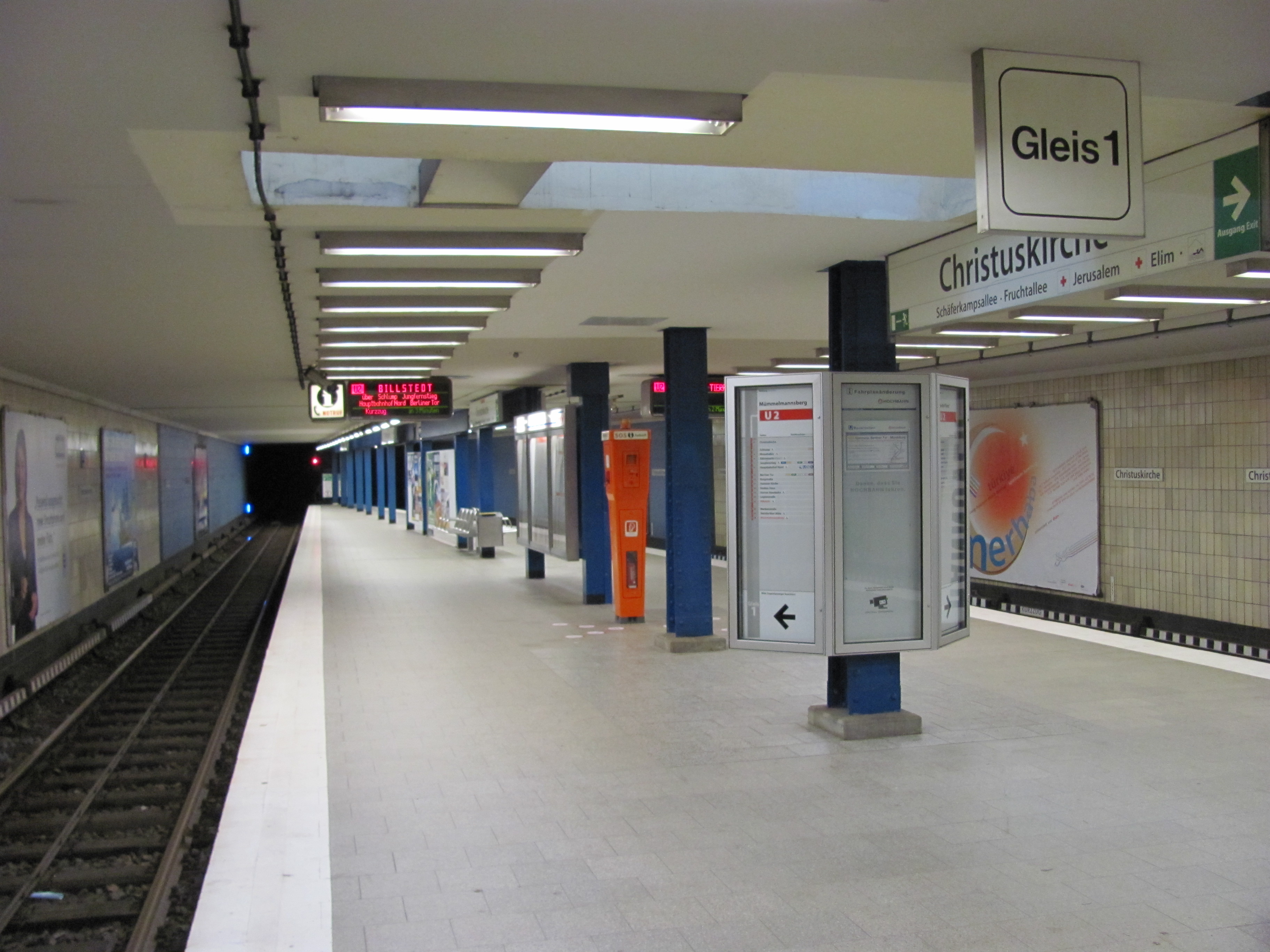

General information
- Location: Fruchtallee; 20259 Hamburg, Germany
- Coordinates: 53°34′10″N 09°57′44″E
- System: Hamburg U-Bahn station
- Operator: Hamburger Hochbahn AG
- Line: U2
- Platforms: 1 island platform
- Tracks: 2
- Connections: Bus

Construction
- Structure type: Underground
- Accessible: Yes

Other information
- Station code: HHA: CH
- Fare zone: HVV: A/101 and 103

History
- Opened: 1 June 1913

Services
Preceding station	Hamburg U-Bahn	Following station
Emilienstraße towards Niendorf Nord	U2	Schlump towards Mümmelmannsberg
Location
- Location within Hamburg Location within Germany

Christuskirche is a metro station on the Hamburg U-Bahn line U2. The underground station was opened in June 1913 and is located in the Hamburg district of Eimsbüttel, Germany. Eimsbüttel is center of the Hamburg borough of Eimsbüttel.

== Service ==
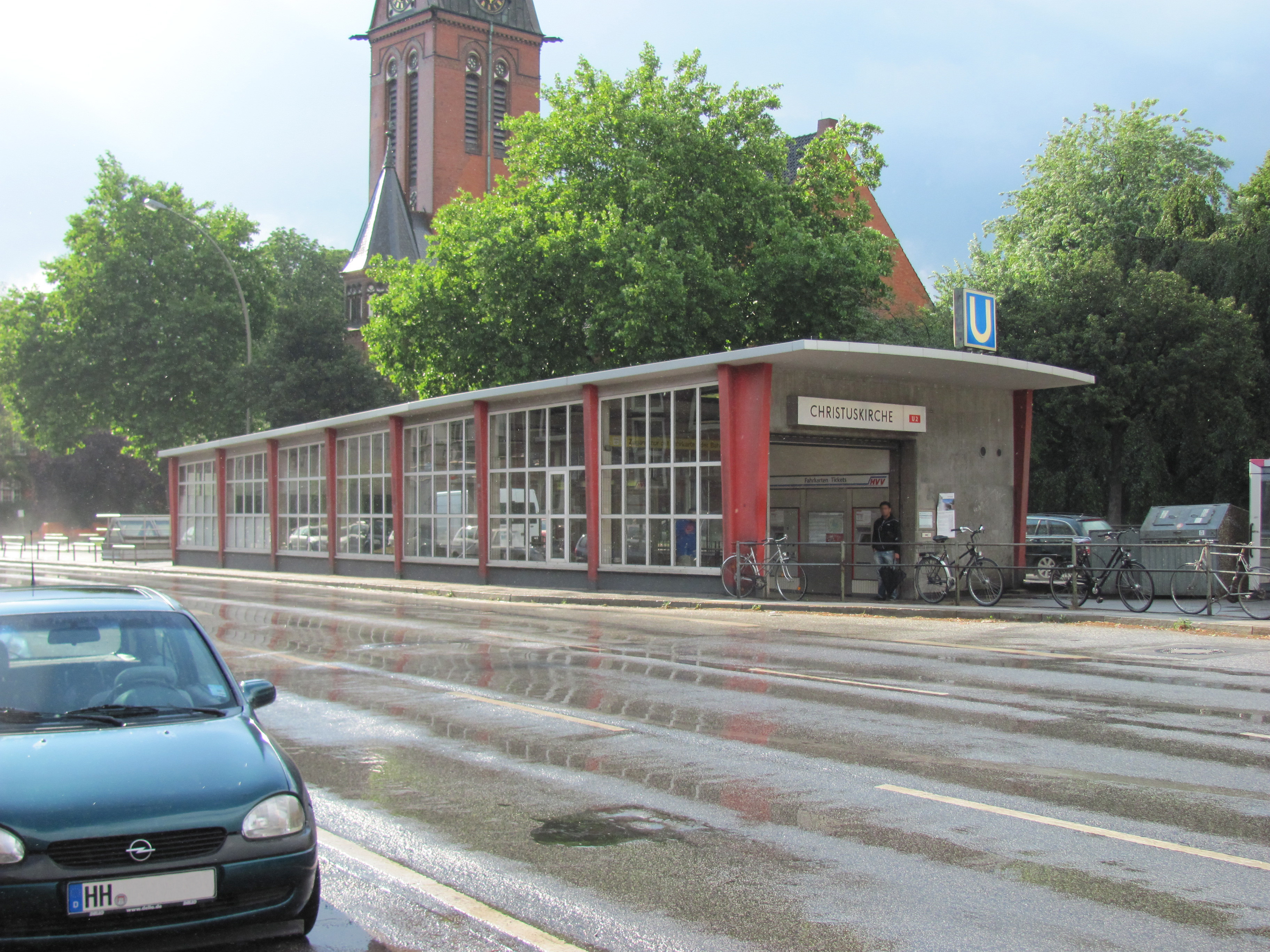
The station's entrance

=== Trains ===
Christuskirche is served by Hamburg U-Bahn line U2; departures are every 5 minutes.

== See also ==
- List of Hamburg U-Bahn stations
