= Berliner Tor station =

Railway station in Hamburg, Germany

Berliner Tor
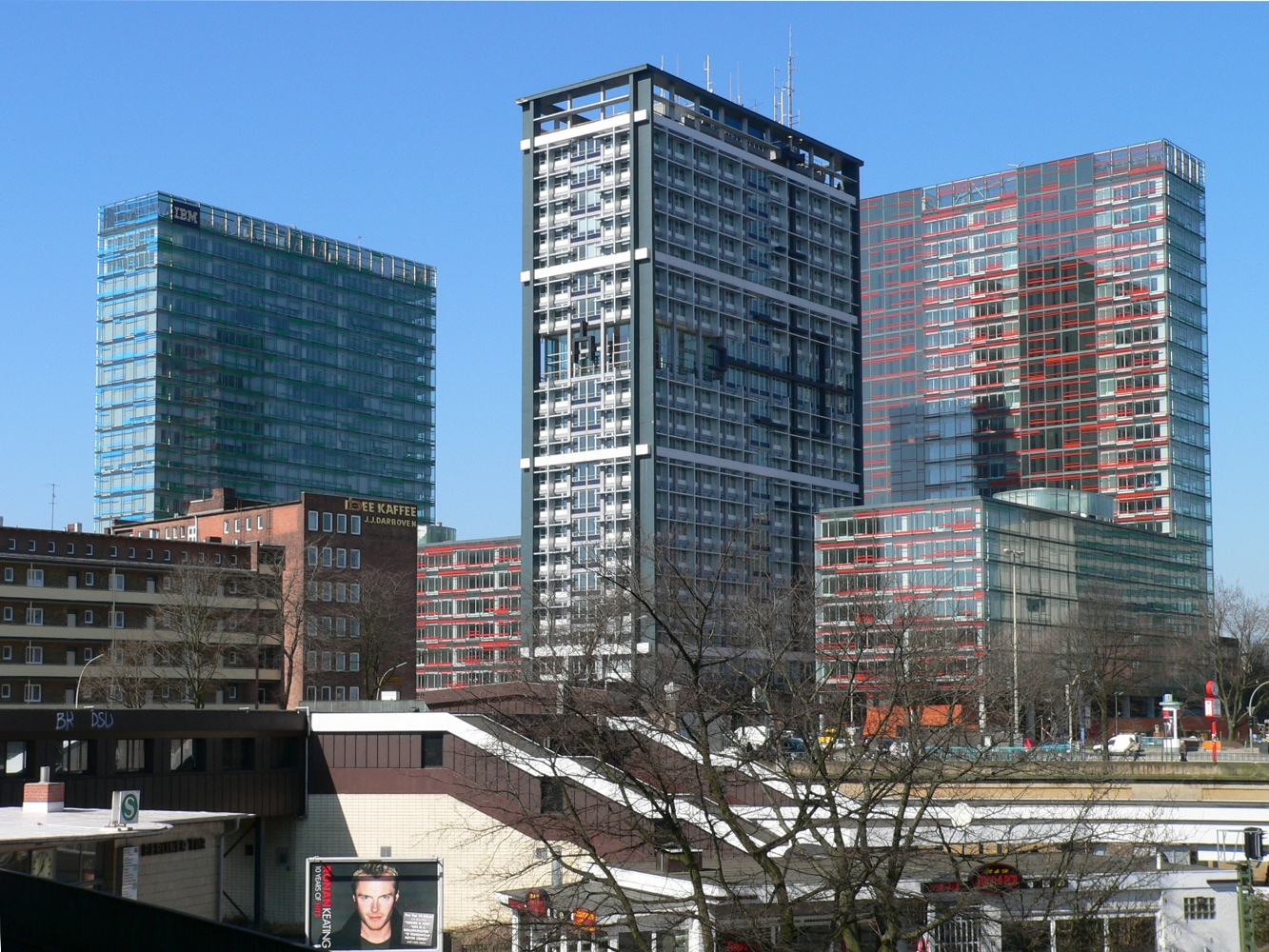
- Berliner Tor S-Bahn station (foreground)

General information
- Location: Berliner-Tor-Damm 10; 22099 Hamburg, Germany
- Coordinates: 53°33′9″N 10°1′32″E
- Lines: S1 S2 U2 U3 U4
- Platforms: 5 (2 underground)
- Tracks: 9 (4 underground)

Construction
- Structure type: Above ground (S-Bahn); Underground (U-Bahn)
- Platform levels: 3
- Parking: Park and ride
- Accessible: Y

Other information
- Station code: HHA: BT ds100: ABTS, DB: 0569; Type: Bhf, Category: 4
- Fare zone: HVV: A/000, 105, and 106

History
- Opened: 5 December 1906; 119 years ago 1 March 1912; 114 years ago
- Closed: 27 July 1943-18 January 1948
- Electrified: 29 January 1908; 118 years ago, 6.3 kV AC system (overhead; turned off in 1955); 10 April 1941; 85 years ago, 1.2 kV DC system (3rd rail) at opening

Services
Preceding station	Hamburg S-Bahn	Following station
Hamburg Hbf towards Wedel	S1	Landwehr towards Poppenbüttel or Hamburg Airport
Hamburg Hbf towards Hamburg-Altona	S2	Rothenburgsort towards Aumühle
Preceding station	Hamburg U-Bahn	Following station
Hauptbahnhof Nord towards Niendorf Nord	U2	Burgstraße towards Mümmelmannsberg
Hauptbahnhof Süd towards Barmbek	U3	Lübecker Straße towards Wandsbek-Gartenstadt
Hauptbahnhof Nord towards Elbbrücken	U4	Burgstraße towards Billstedt
Location

Berliner Tor (German: [bɛʁˈliːnɐ ˈtoːɐ̯]; literally "Berlin Gate") is a transport hub in Hamburg, Germany, served by the Hamburg U-Bahn (underground railway) and the Hamburg S-Bahn (suburban railway). The station is located in St. Georg, part of the borough of Hamburg-Mitte.

The railway station is listed by the German railway company, because S-Bahn call at this station, and the S-Bahn part of it is managed by DB Station&Service.

== History ==
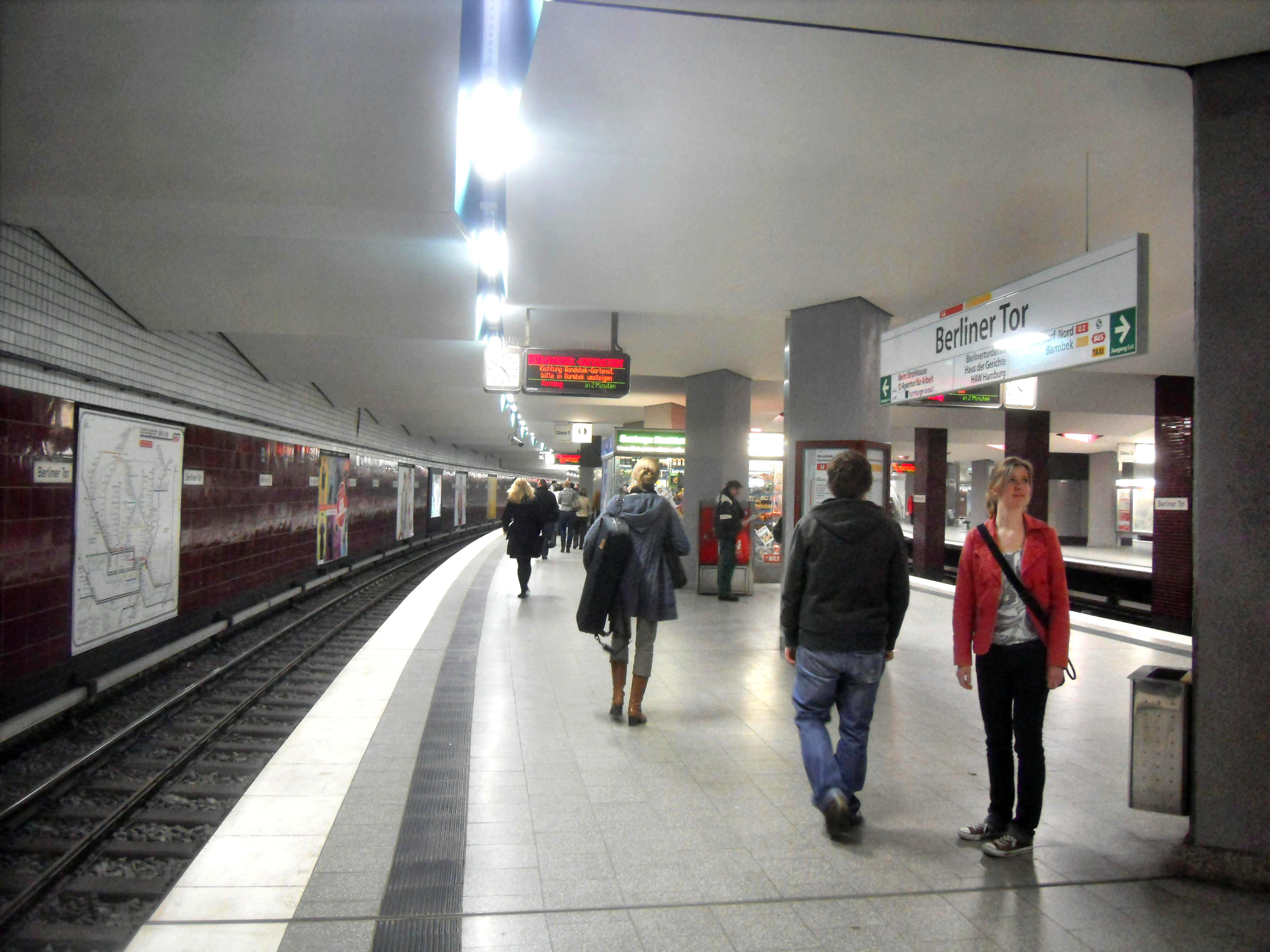
Platform of Berliner Tor U-Bahn station

Berliner Tor S-Bahn station opened in 1906.

The original Berliner Tor U-Bahn station was designed by the architect, Erich Elingius, and built between 1908 and 1910, opening on 1 March 1912. It had a brick wall on the North, and some glass walls on the South.

During the British Operation Gomorrah (air raids) in 1943, the damage to the station was so severe that the U-Bahn was no longer able to serve the line. On 19 January 1948, the station re-opened as a terminus for trains to Barmbek via Schlump, and from 1 July 1949, trains continued again to Mundsburg.

From 1962 to 1964, a new station complex was built to the North of the old one, and it opened on 10 May 1964, after which the old building was demolished. Between 1964 and 1966, the station was expanded from two platforms to four. From 2 January 1967, the U3 served the station, and between September 1968 and June 1973, the U21.

== Services ==
Berliner Tor is a station for the rapid transit trains of the lines S1 and S2 of the Hamburg S-Bahn and the lines U2, U3 and U4 of the Hamburg U-Bahn. In front of the railway station exits, there are various bus stops.

The Hamburg U-Bahn opened the line U4 in 2012.

== Other constructions ==
Berliner Tor deep bunker, built in 1940, is nearby.

== See also ==
- Hamburger Verkehrsverbund (HVV)
- List of Hamburg U-Bahn stations
- List of Hamburg S-Bahn stations
