= Legienstraße station =

Railway station in Hamburg, Germany

Legienstraße
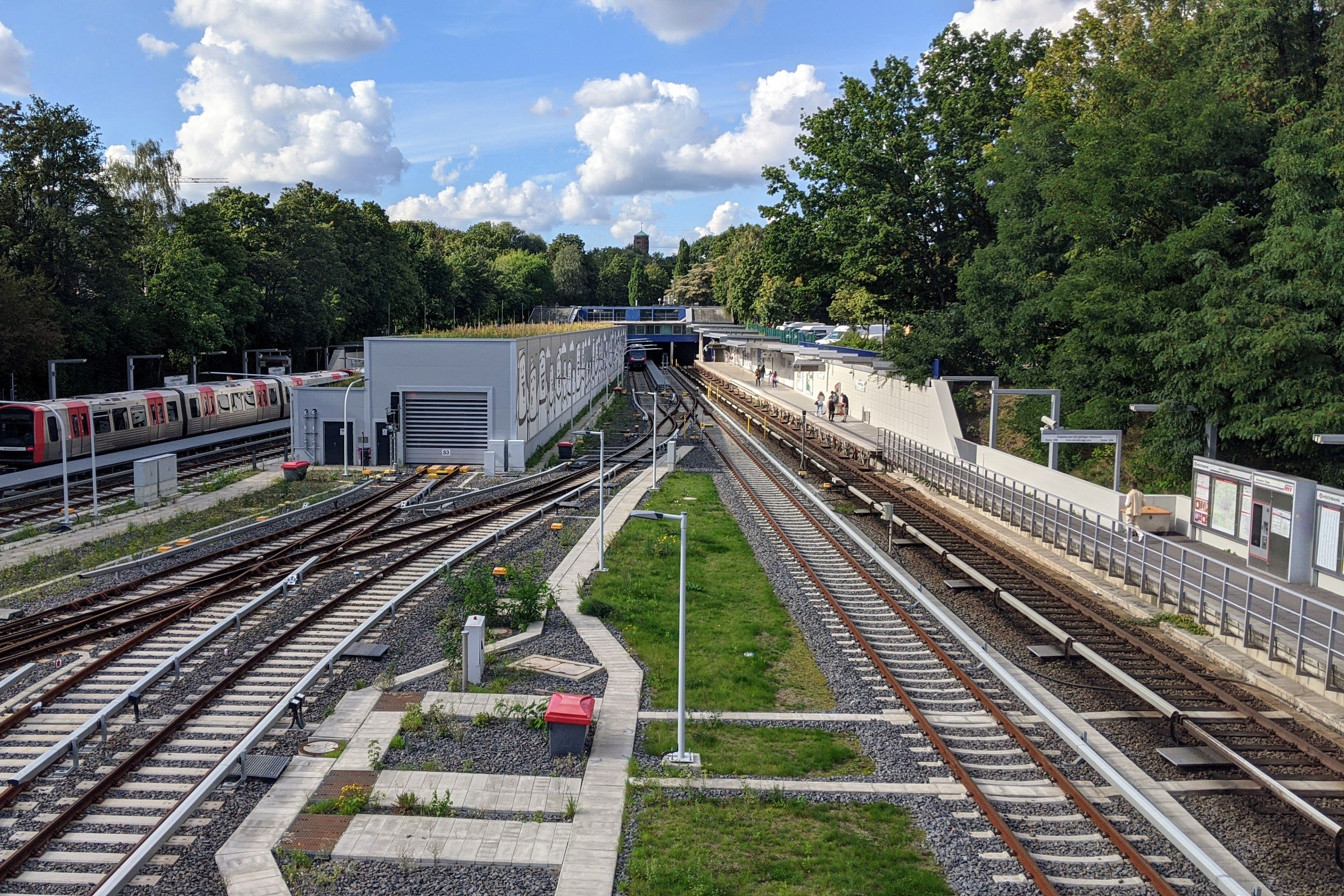

General information
- Location: Vierbergen; 22111 Hamburg, Germany
- Coordinates: 53°32′49″N 10°05′47″E
- System: Hamburg U-Bahn station
- Operator: Hamburger Hochbahn AG
- Line: U2 U4
- Platforms: 2 side platforms
- Tracks: 2
- Connections: Bus

Construction
- Structure type: At grade
- Accessible: Yes

Other information
- Station code: HHA: LE
- Fare zone: HVV: A/205 and 206

History
- Opened: 24 September 1967; 58 years ago
- Electrified: at opening

Services
Preceding station	Hamburg U-Bahn	Following station
Horner Rennbahn towards Niendorf Nord	U2	Billstedt towards Mümmelmannsberg
Horner Rennbahn towards Elbbrücken	U4	Billstedt Terminus
Location
- Location within Hamburg Location within Germany

Legienstraße is a metro station on the Hamburg U-Bahn lines U2 and U4. The station was opened in September 1967 and is located in the Hamburg district of Horn, Germany. Horn is part of the borough of Hamburg-Mitte.

Legienstraße is peculiar among Hamburg U-Bahn stations, as its two side platforms are rather wide apart, with a maintenance facility between the platforms. Previously the two platforms were separated by a green median strip.

== Service ==
=== Trains ===
Legienstraße is served by Hamburg U-Bahn lines U2 and U4; departures are every 5 minutes.

== See also ==
- List of Hamburg U-Bahn stations
