= Horner Rennbahn station =

Hamburg U-Bahn station

Horner Rennbahn
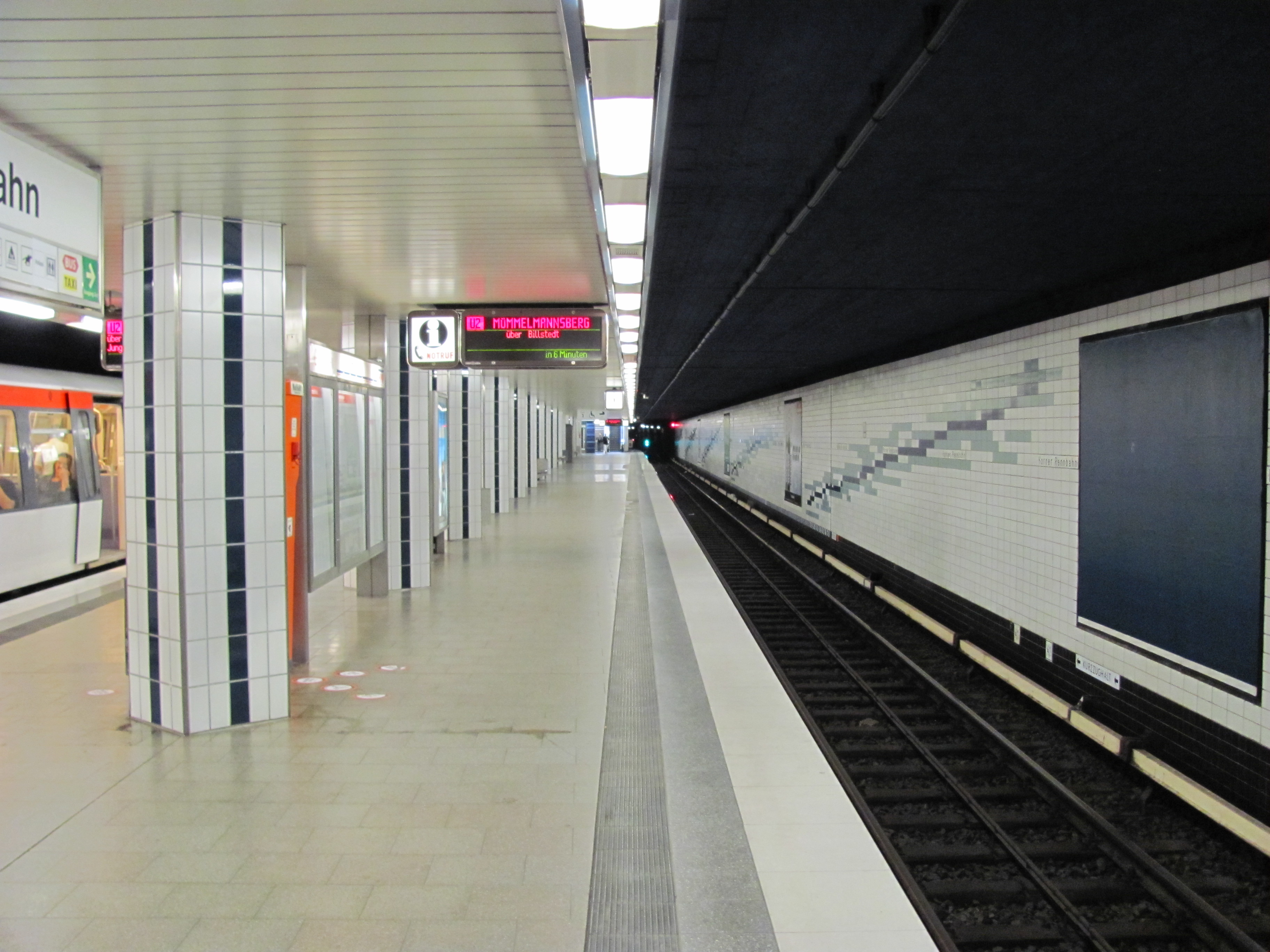

General information
- Location: Rennbahnstraße; 22111 Hamburg, Germany
- Coordinates: 53°33′14″N 10°05′06″E
- System: Hamburg U-Bahn station
- Operator: Hamburger Hochbahn AG
- Line: U2 U4
- Platforms: 1 island platform
- Tracks: 2
- Connections: Bus

Construction
- Structure type: Underground
- Accessible: Yes

Other information
- Station code: HHA: HN
- Fare zone: HVV: A/105, 106, 205, and 206

History
- Opened: 2 January 1967

Services
Preceding station	Hamburg U-Bahn	Following station
Rauhes Haus towards Niendorf Nord	U2	Legienstraße towards Mümmelmannsberg
Rauhes Haus towards Elbbrücken	U4	Legienstraße towards Billstedt
Location
- Location within Hamburg Location within Germany

Horner Rennbahn is a metro station on the Hamburg U-Bahn lines U2 and U4. The underground station was opened in January 1967 and is located in the Hamburg district of Horn, Germany. Horn is part of the borough of Hamburg-Mitte.

== Service ==
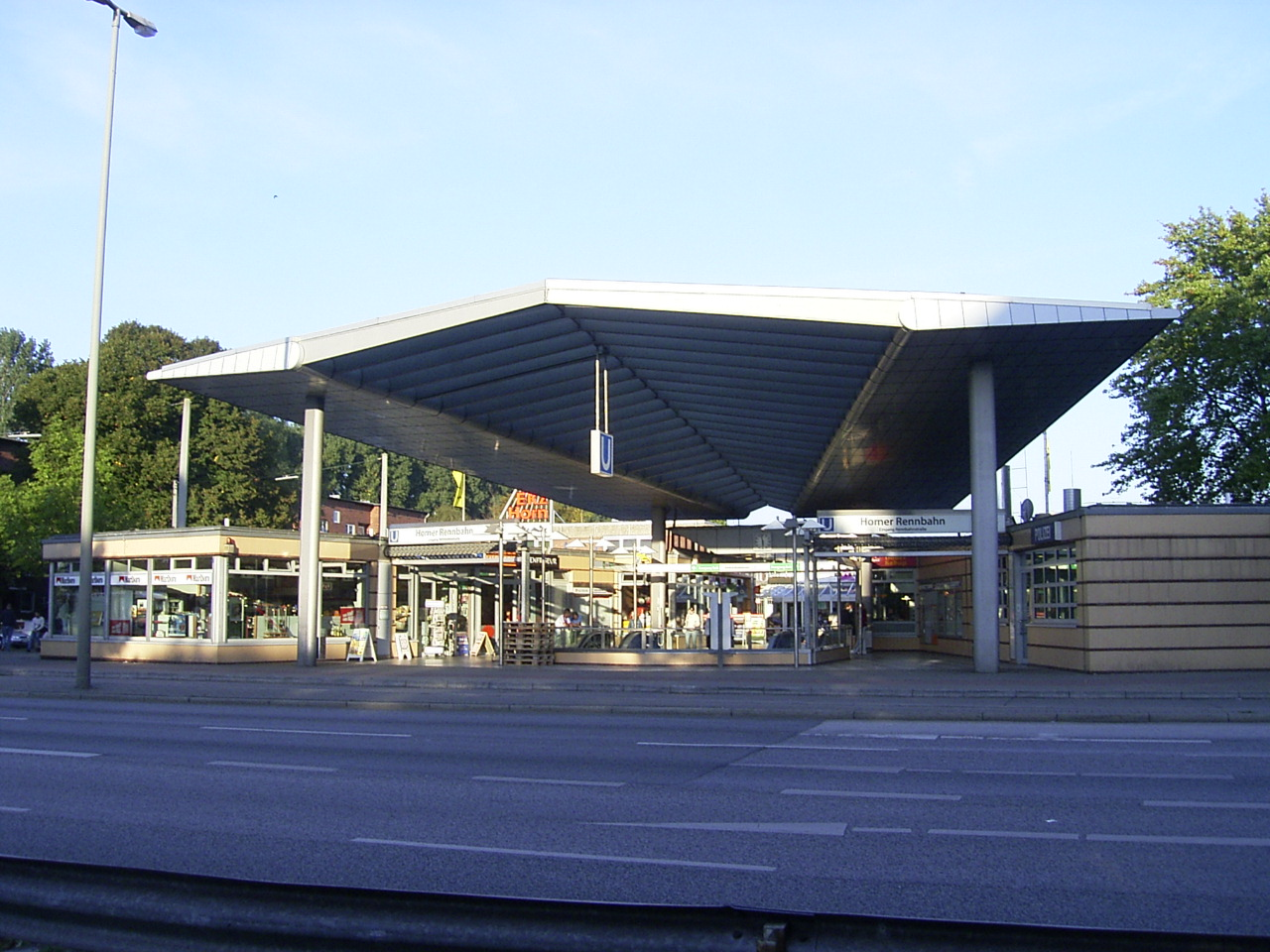
The station's eastern entrance at Horner Rennbahn (race course)

=== Trains ===
Horner Rennbahn is served by Hamburg U-Bahn lines U2 and U4; departures are every 5 minutes.

== See also ==
- List of Hamburg U-Bahn stations
