= Burgstraße station =

Railway station in Hamburg, Germany

Burgstraße
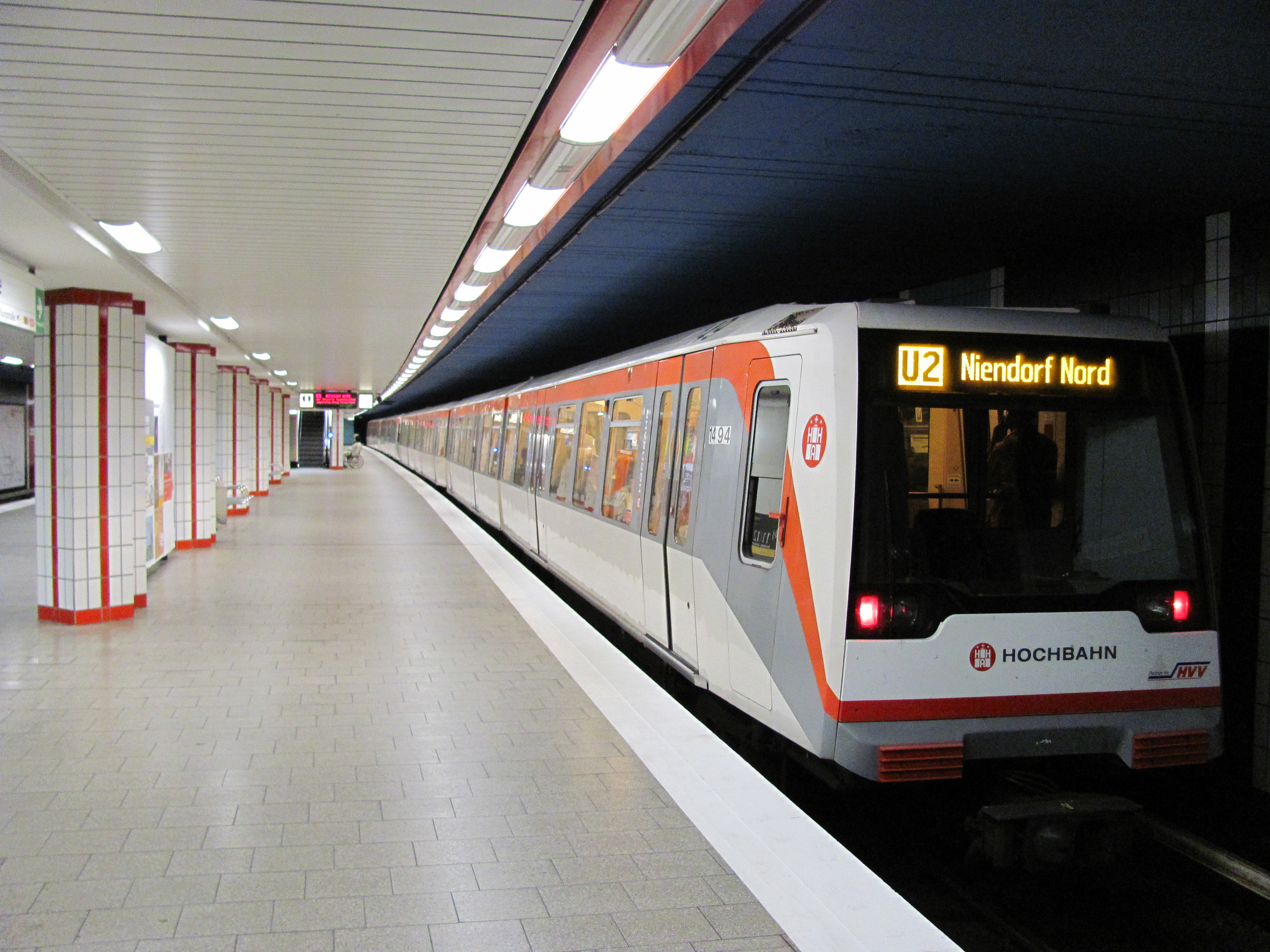

General information
- Location: Hammer Landstraße; 20535 Hamburg, Germany
- Coordinates: 53°33′20″N 10°02′30″E
- System: Hamburg U-Bahn station
- Operator: Hamburger Hochbahn AG
- Line: U2 U4
- Platforms: 1 island platform
- Tracks: 2
- Connections: Bus, Taxi

Construction
- Structure type: Underground
- Accessible: Yes

Other information
- Station code: HHA: BG
- Fare zone: HVV: A/105 and 106

History
- Opened: 2 January 1967

Services
Preceding station	Hamburg U-Bahn	Following station
Berliner Tor towards Niendorf Nord	U2	Hammer Kirche towards Mümmelmannsberg
Berliner Tor towards Elbbrücken	U4	Hammer Kirche towards Billstedt
Location
- Location within Hamburg Location within Germany

Burgstraße is a metro station located at Hammer Landstraße in Hamm, Hamburg, Germany. Hamm is part of the borough of Hamburg-Mitte. The underground station is served by Hamburg U-Bahn lines U2 and U4.

== Service ==
Burgstraße U-Bahn station is served by Hamburg U-Bahn lines U2 and U4; departures are every 5 minutes.

== Gallery ==
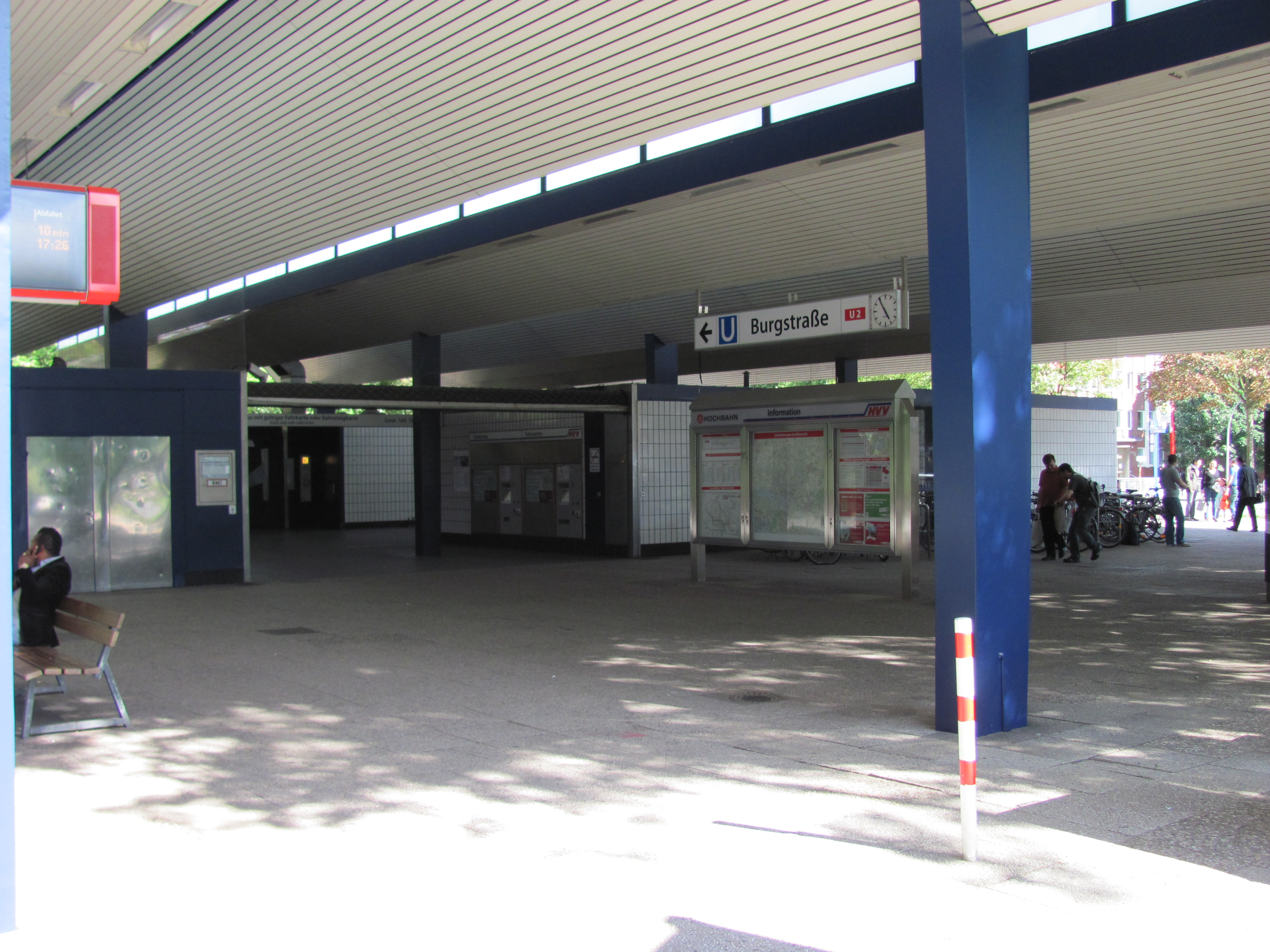
Burgstraße entrance area

== See also ==
- List of Hamburg U-Bahn stations
