= Hammer Kirche station =

Railway station in Hamburg, Germany

Hammer Kirche
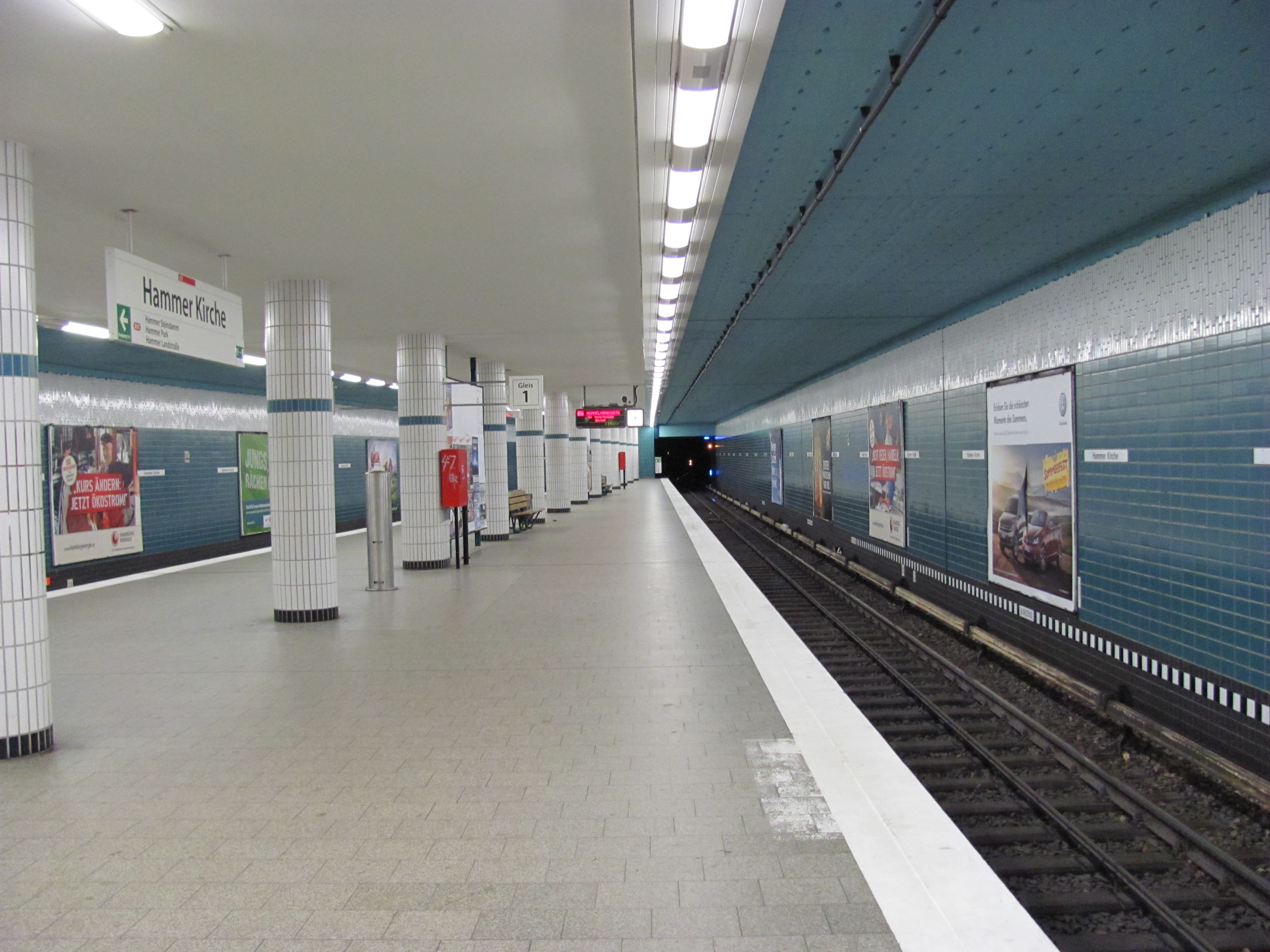

General information
- Location: Hammer Steindamm; 20535 Hamburg, Germany
- Coordinates: 53°33′20″N 10°03′18″E
- System: Hamburg U-Bahn station
- Operator: Hamburger Hochbahn AG
- Line: U2 U4
- Platforms: 1 island platform
- Tracks: 2
- Connections: Bus

Construction
- Structure type: Underground
- Accessible: Yes

Other information
- Station code: HHA: HK
- Fare zone: HVV: A/105 and 106

History
- Opened: 2 January 1967

Services
Preceding station	Hamburg U-Bahn	Following station
Burgstraße towards Niendorf Nord	U2	Rauhes Haus towards Mümmelmannsberg
Burgstraße towards Elbbrücken	U4	Rauhes Haus towards Billstedt
Location
- Location within Hamburg Location within Germany

Hammer Kirche is an underground metro station on the Hamburg U-Bahn lines U2 and U4. The underground station was opened in January 1967 and is located in the Hamburg district of Hamm, Germany. Hamm is part of the borough of Hamburg-Mitte.

== Service ==
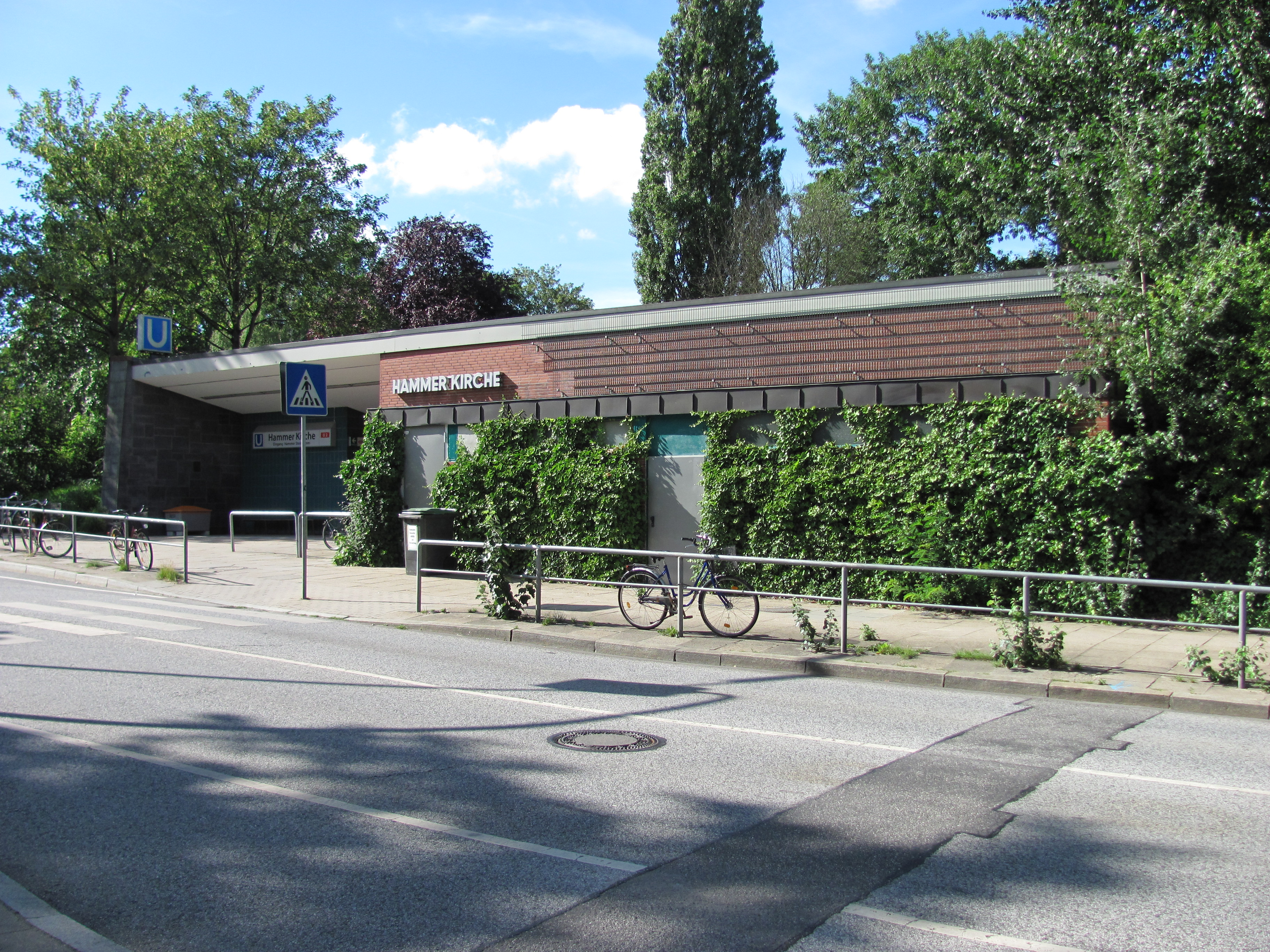
The station's entrance at Hammer Steindamm

=== Trains ===
Hammer Kirche is served by Hamburg U-Bahn lines U2 and U4; departures are every 5 minutes.

== See also ==
- List of Hamburg U-Bahn stations
