= Lutterothstraße station =

Railway station in Hamburg, Germany

Lutterothstraße
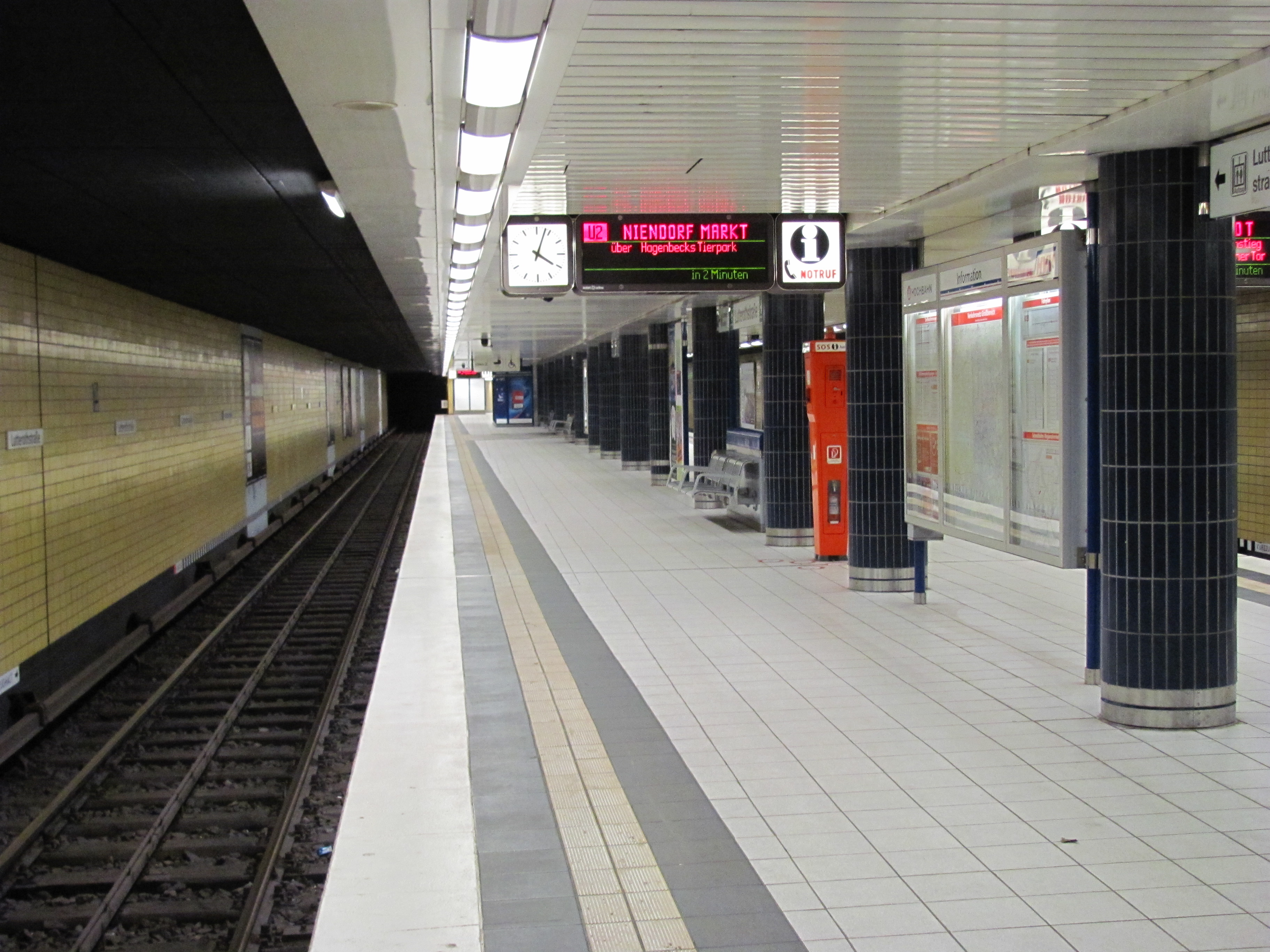

General information
- Location: Lutterothstraße; 20255 Hamburg, Germany
- Coordinates: 53°34′55″N 09°56′51″E
- System: Hamburg U-Bahn station
- Operator: Hamburger Hochbahn AG
- Line: U2
- Platforms: 1 island platform
- Tracks: 2
- Connections: Bus

Construction
- Structure type: Underground
- Accessible: Yes

Other information
- Station code: HHA: LT
- Fare zone: HVV: A/101 and 103

History
- Opened: 30 May 1965; 61 years ago
- Electrified: at opening

Services
Preceding station	Hamburg U-Bahn	Following station
Hagenbecks Tierpark towards Niendorf Nord	U2	Osterstraße towards Mümmelmannsberg
Location
- Location within Hamburg Location within Schleswig-Holstein Location within Germany Location within Europe

Lutterothstraße is a metro station on the Hamburg U-Bahn line U2. The underground station was opened in May 1965 and is located in the Hamburg district of Eimsbüttel, Germany. Eimsbüttel is center of the Hamburg borough of Eimsbüttel.

== Trains ==
Lutterothstraße is served by Hamburg U-Bahn line U2; departures are every 5 minutes.

== Gallery ==
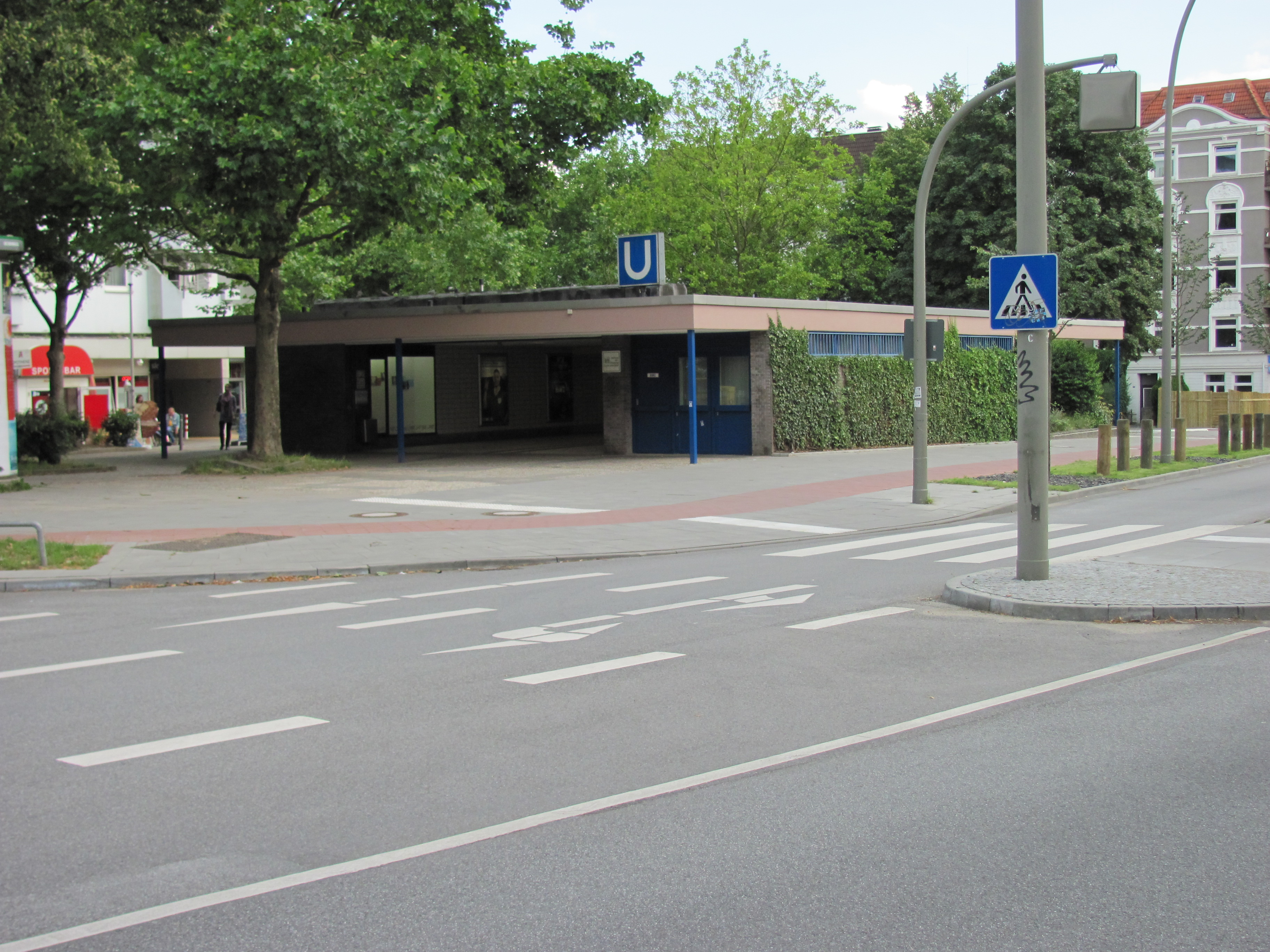
One of the station's entrances

== See also ==
- List of Hamburg U-Bahn stations
