= Rauhes Haus station =

Railway station in Hamburg, Germany

Rauhes Haus
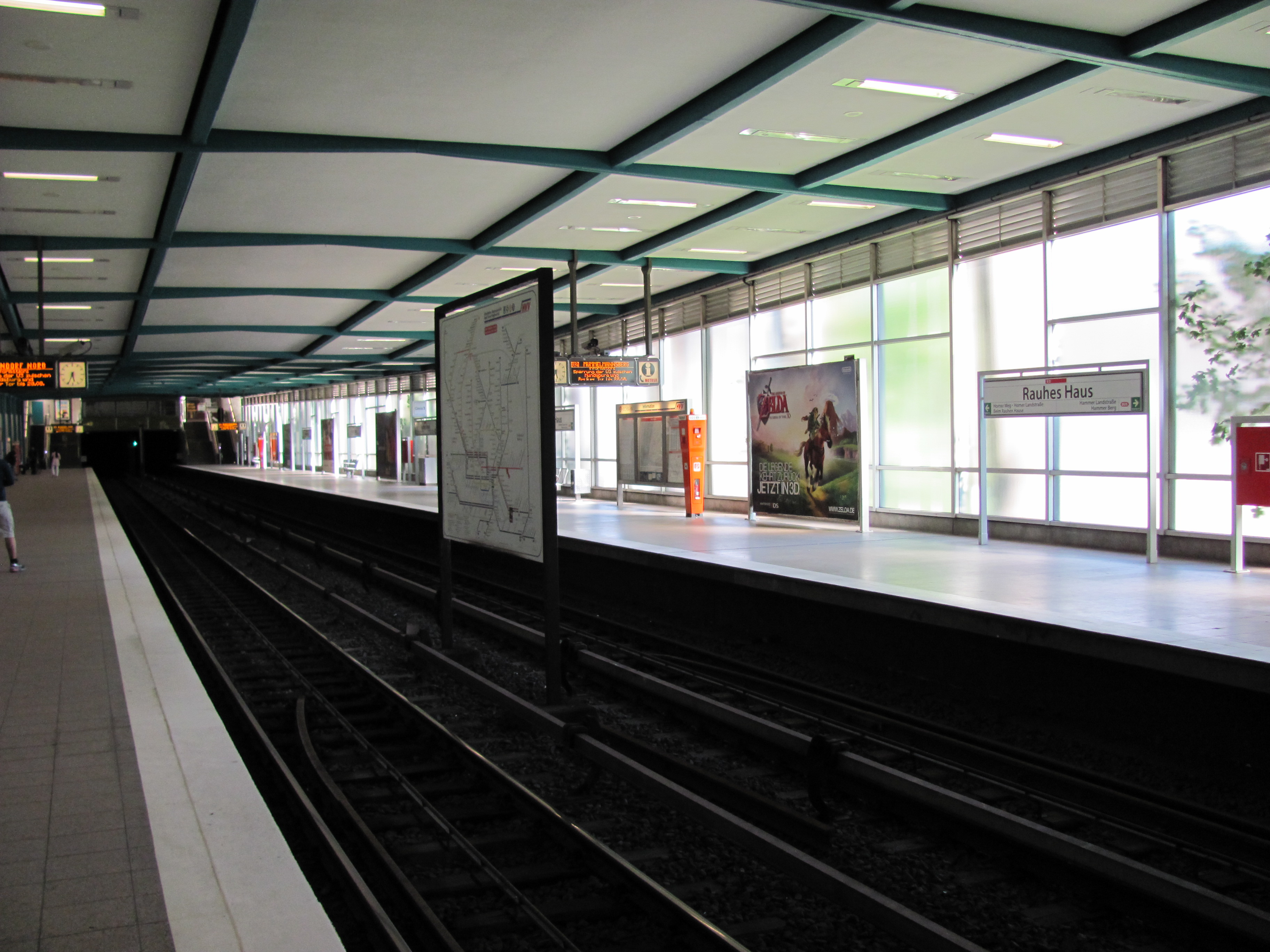

General information
- Location: Hammer Landstraße; 20535 Hamburg, Germany
- Coordinates: 53°33′15″N 10°03′58″E
- System: Hamburg U-Bahn station
- Operator: Hamburger Hochbahn AG
- Line: U2 U4
- Platforms: 2 side platforms
- Tracks: 2
- Connections: Bus

Construction
- Structure type: At grade
- Accessible: Yes

Other information
- Station code: HHA: HK
- Fare zone: HVV: A/105 and 106

History
- Opened: 2 January 1967

Services
Preceding station	Hamburg U-Bahn	Following station
Hammer Kirche towards Niendorf Nord	U2	Horner Rennbahn towards Mümmelmannsberg
Hammer Kirche towards Elbbrücken	U4	Horner Rennbahn towards Billstedt
Location
- Location within Hamburg Location within Germany

Rauhes Haus is a metro station on the Hamburg U-Bahn lines U2 and U4. The station was opened in January 1967 and is located in the Hamburg district of Hamm, Germany. Hamm is part of the borough of Hamburg-Mitte. The station is named after the nearby 'Rauhes Haus'.

== Service ==
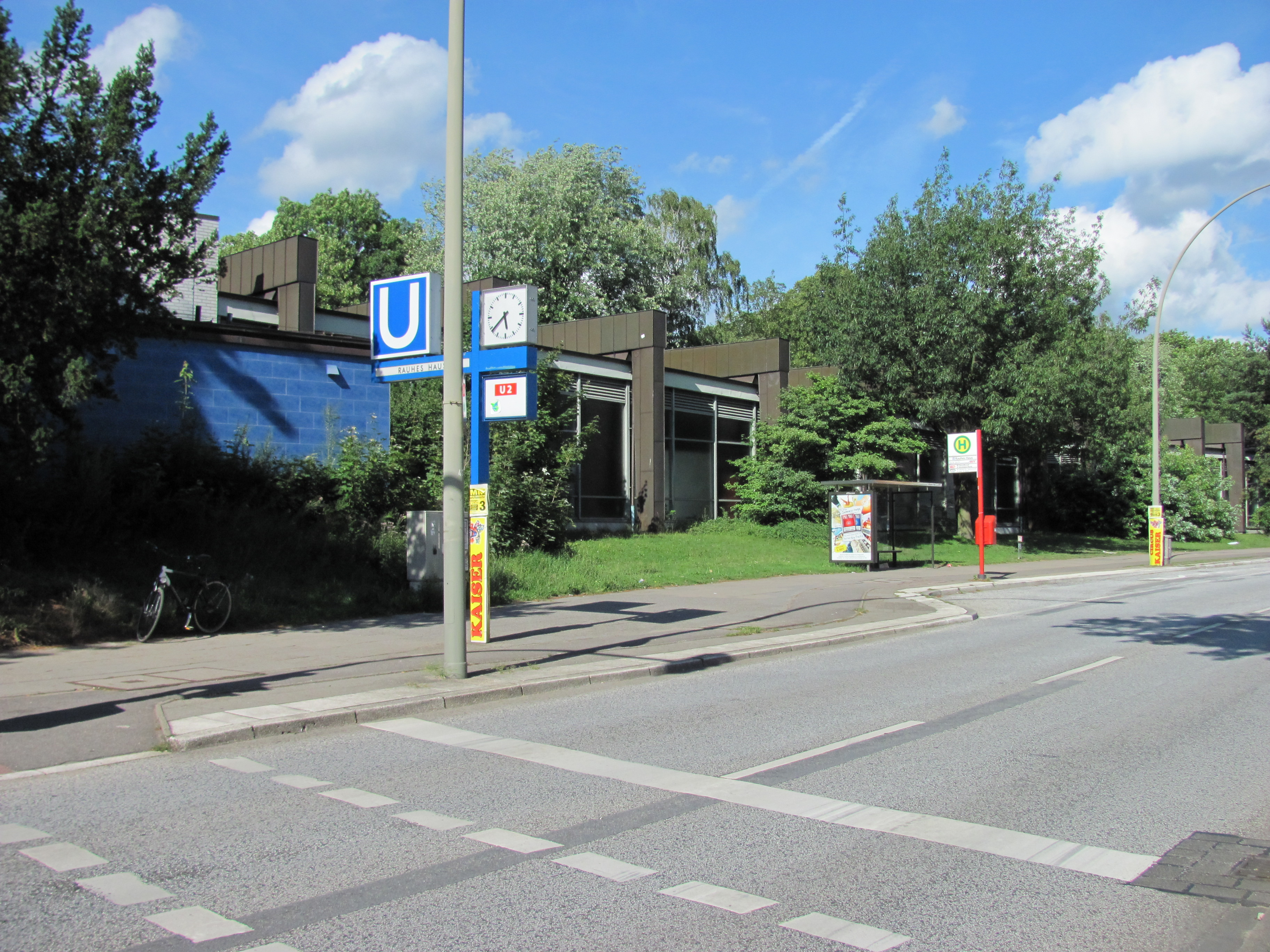
The station's exterior at Hammer Landstraße

=== Trains ===
Rauhes Haus is served by Hamburg U-Bahn lines U2 and U4; departures are every 5 minutes.

== See also ==
- List of Hamburg U-Bahn stations
