= Berliner Tor deep bunker =

Deep bunker near Berliner Tor station in Hamburg, Germany

Coordinates: 53.5533°N 10.0264°E

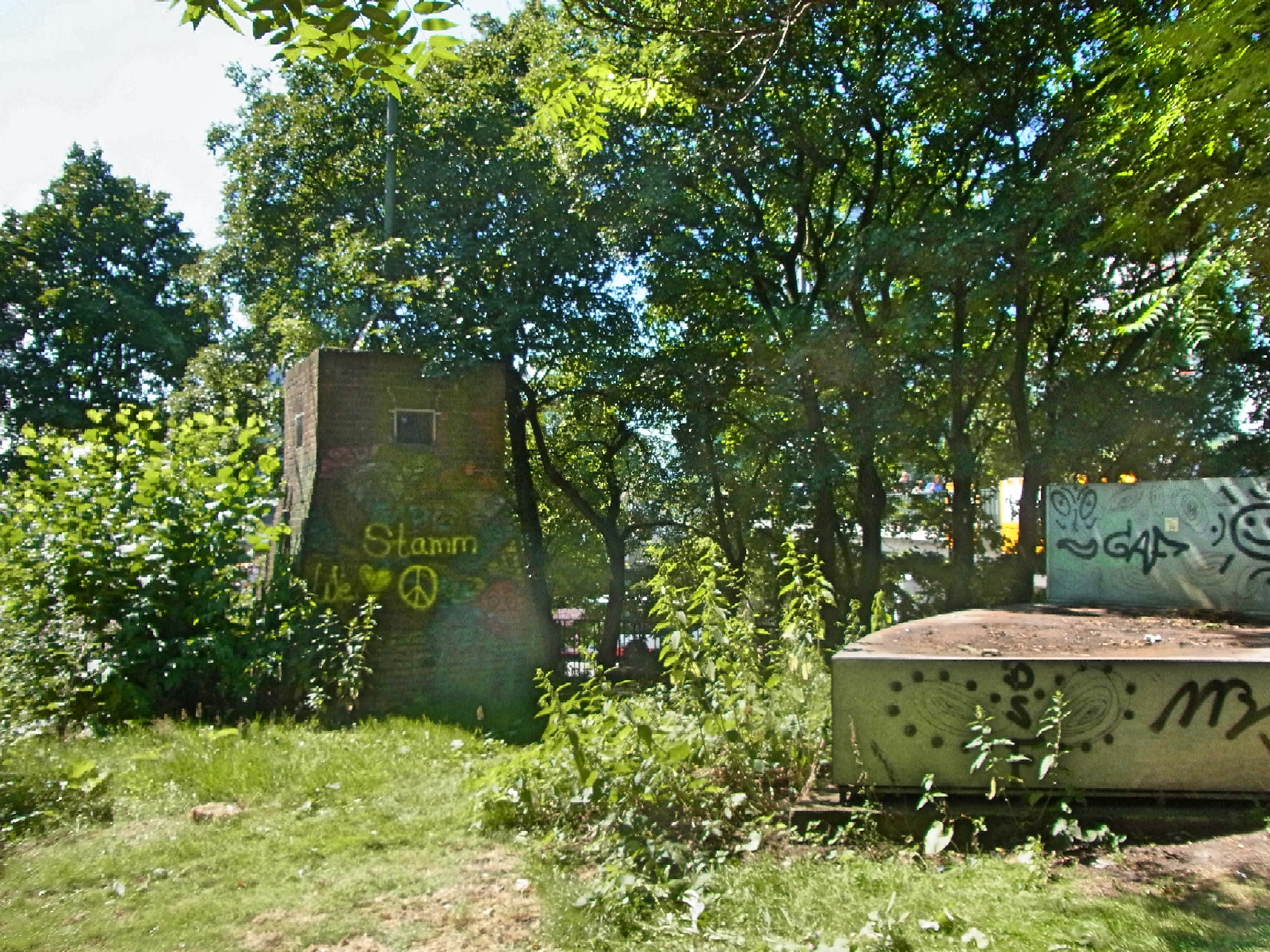
Entrance to the bunker

Berliner Tor deep bunker is a deep bunker near Berliner Tor station in Hamburg, Germany. The structure was originally constructed in 1940 by the government of Nazi Germany as a civilian refuge from bombing. It had a capacity of 1000 people.

In 1943, the bunker provided refuge from the firestorm caused by Operation Gomorrah, a concerted raid of bombing with incendiary weapons during the allied bombing of Hamburg which resulted in over 35,000 deaths.

In the Cold War period, it was reused as a nuclear bunker by the post-war West German government, and extensively renovated for that use, with the renovations finished in 1963.
