= Schlump station =

Metro station in Eimsbüttel, Germany

Schlump
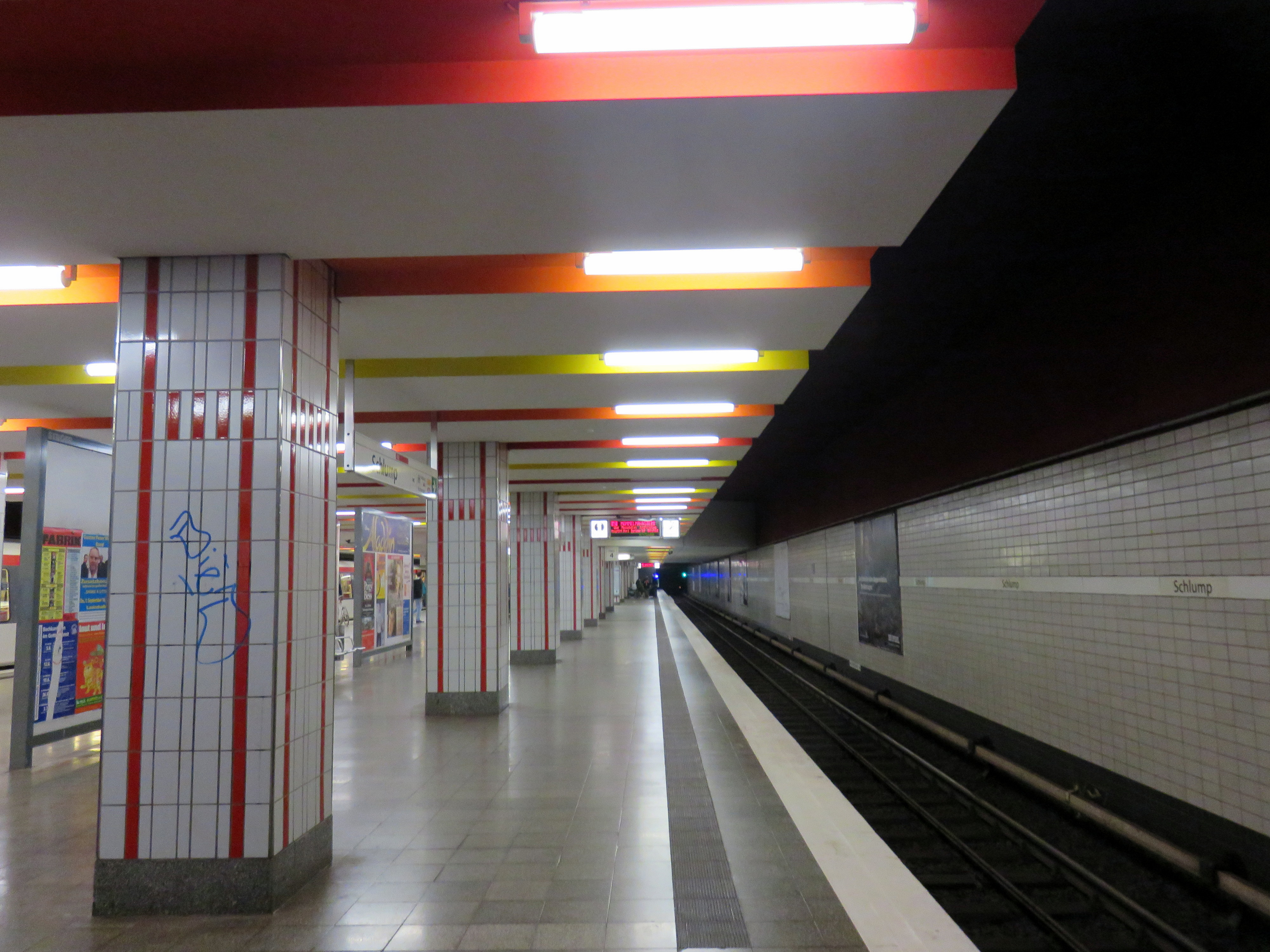

General information
- Location: Beim Schlump; 20357 Hamburg, Germany
- Coordinates: 53°34′04″N 09°58′12″E
- System: Hamburg U-Bahn station
- Operator: Hamburger Hochbahn AG
- Line: U2 U3
- Platforms: 3 island platforms
- Tracks: 5
- Connections: Bus, Taxi

Construction
- Structure type: Underground
- Accessible: Yes

Other information
- Station code: HHA: SL
- Fare zone: HVV: A/000, 101, and 103

History
- Opened: 25 May 1912
- Rebuilt: 26 May 1968

Services
Preceding station	Hamburg U-Bahn	Following station
Christuskirche towards Niendorf Nord	U2	Messehallen towards Mümmelmannsberg
Hoheluftbrücke towards Barmbek	U3	Sternschanze towards Wandsbek-Gartenstadt
Location
- Location within Hamburg Location within Schleswig-Holstein Location within Germany Location within Europe

Schlump is a metro station located in Eimsbüttel, Hamburg. It is served by Hamburg U-Bahn lines U2 and U3.

Schlump station opened in 1912 for line U3, and in 1973 for line U2. With a total of five tracks this is a transport hub.

== Trains ==
Schlump is served by Hamburg U-Bahn lines U2 and U3.

== Gallery ==
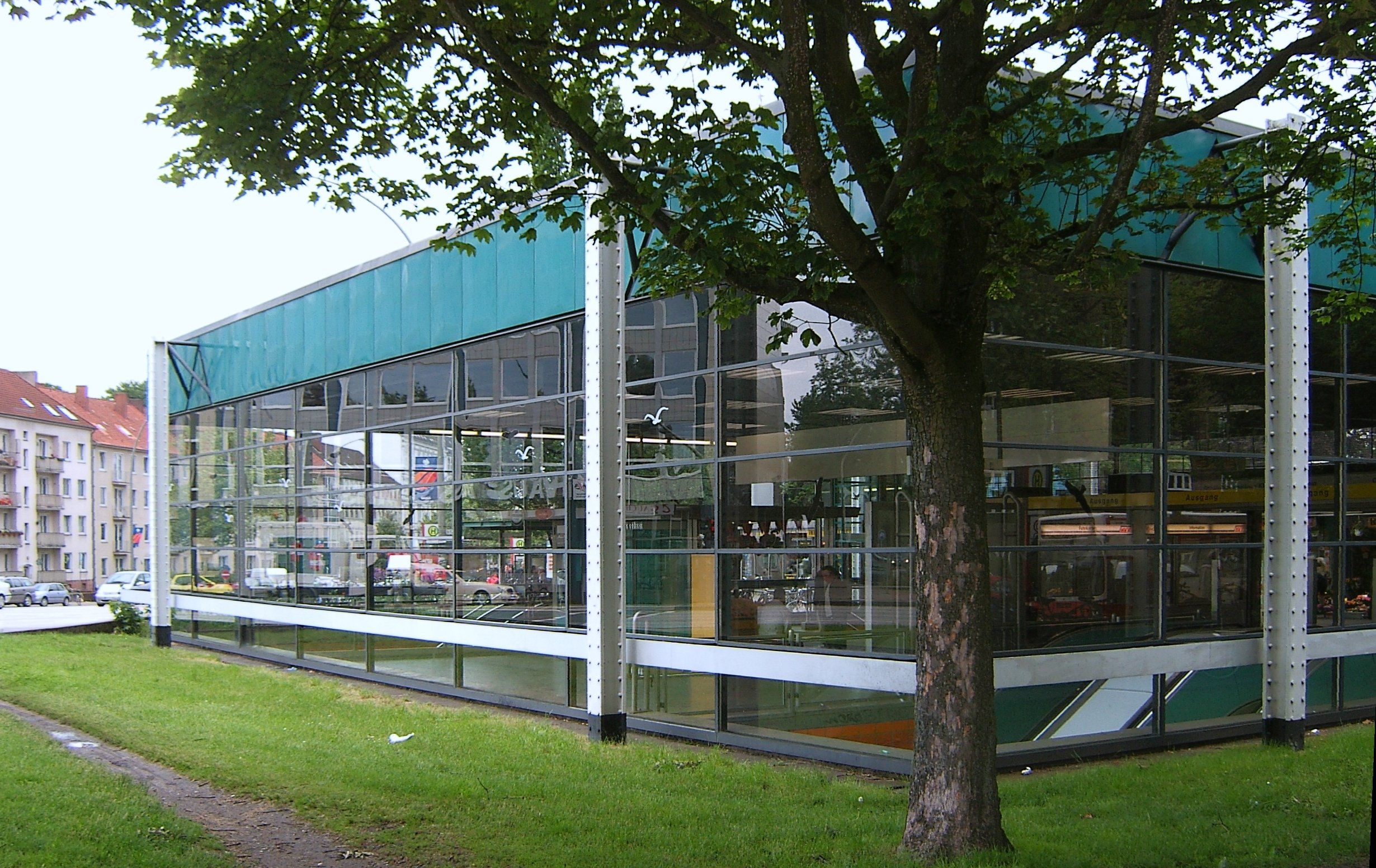
The station's 1968-rebuilt entrance building on surface

== See also ==
- List of Hamburg U-Bahn stations
