= Eimsbüttel (quarter) =

- Quarter of Hamburg
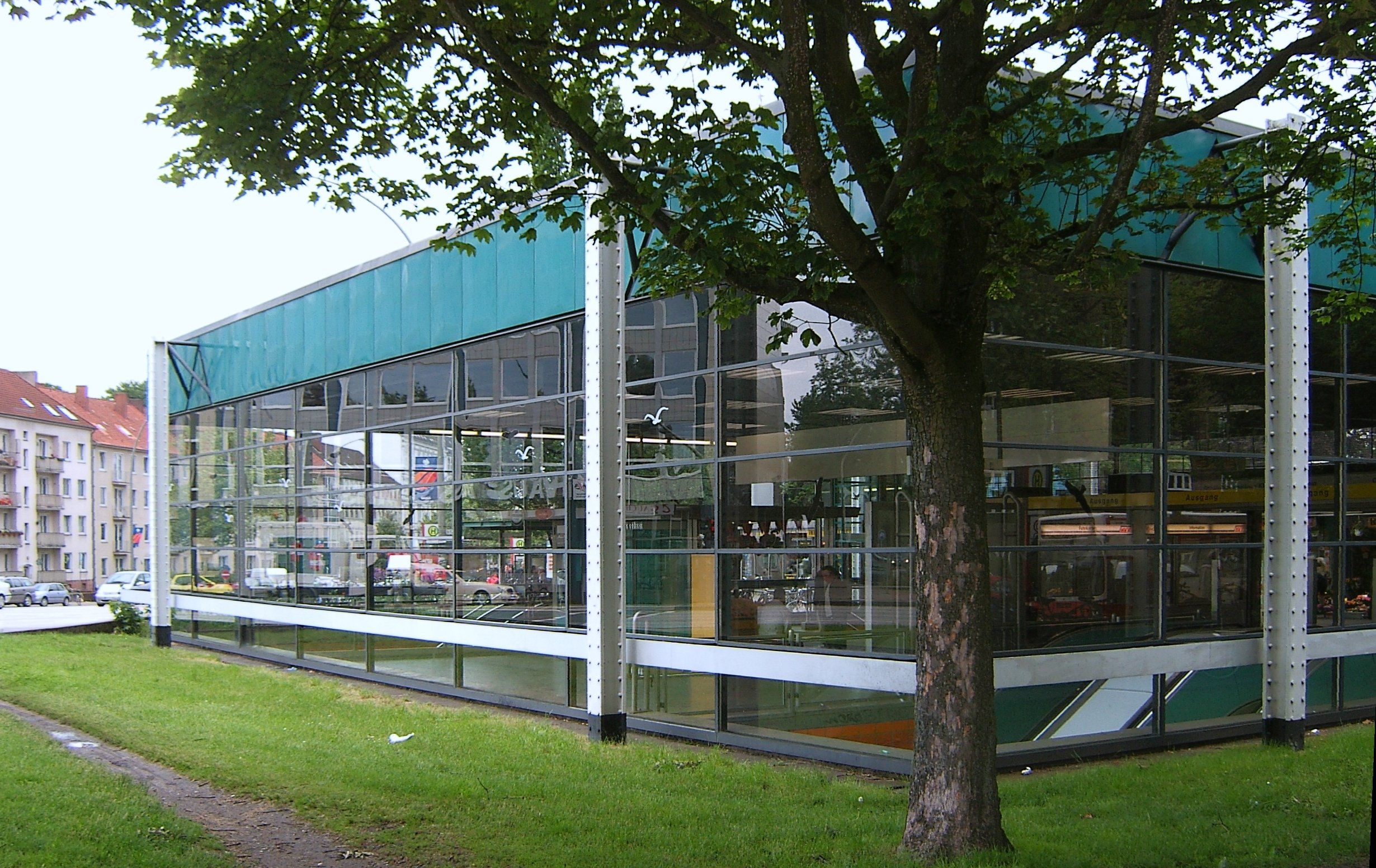
- Underground railway station Schlump

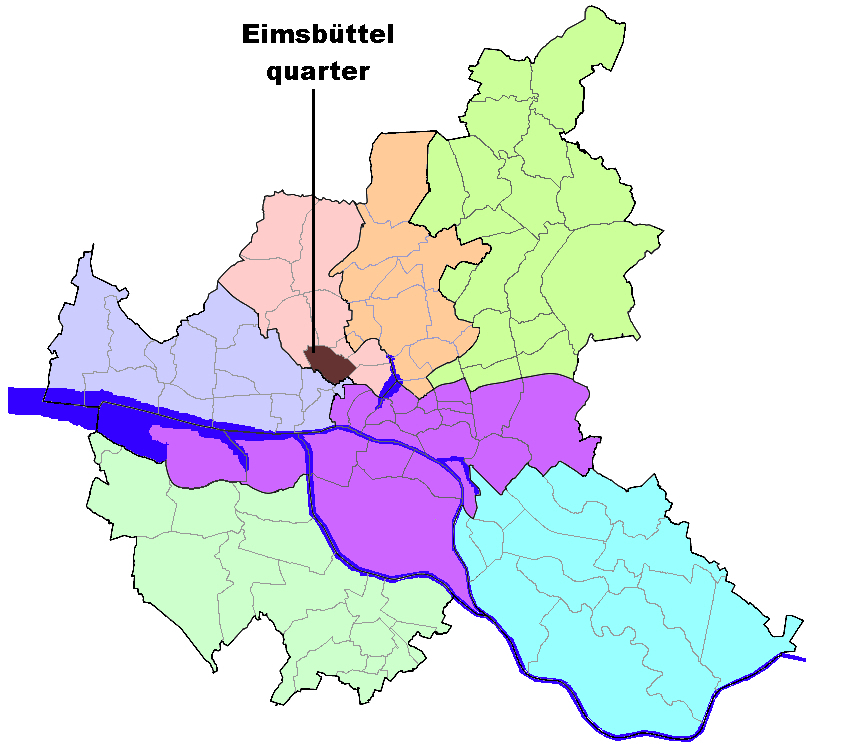
- Location of Eimsbüttel within Hamburg
- Interactive map of Eimsbüttel
- Location within Germany Location within Hamburg
- Coordinates: 53°34′26″N 9°57′32″E
- Country: Germany
- State: Hamburg
- City: Hamburg
- Borough: Eimsbüttel

Area
  - Total: 3.2 km^{2} (1.2 sq mi)

Population (2024-12-31)
  - Total: 57,798
  - Density: 18,000/km^{2} (47,000/sq mi)
- Time zone: UTC+01:00 (CET)
  - Summer (DST): UTC+02:00 (CEST)
- Dialling codes: 040
- Vehicle registration: HH

Eimsbüttel (German pronunciation: [ˈaɪmsˌbʏtl̩]) is one of the 104 quarters in the Eimsbüttel borough of Hamburg, Germany. In 2020 the population was 57,593.

== History ==
On March 1, 2008 the Eimsbüttel quarter lost a part of its area to form the quarter Sternschanze in the borough Altona.

== Geography ==
In 2006 according to the statistical office of Hamburg and Schleswig-Holstein, the quarter Eimsbüttel has an area of 3,2 km^{2}.

== Politics ==
These are the results of Eimsbüttel in the Hamburg state election:

State Election	Greens	SPD	Left	CDU	FDP	Volt	AfD	Others
2020	40,3 %	27,8 %	15,7 %	4,3 %	3,0 %	2,2 %	2,2 %	4,5 %
2015	24,9 %	39,6 %	15,1 %	7,3 %	4,9 %	–	2,6 %	5,6 %
2011	23,1 %	46,6 %	9,5 %	10,1 %	3,9 %	–	–	6,8 %
2008	19,5 %	39,6 %	8,7 %	26,5 %	3,6 %	–	–	2,1 %
2004	28,4 %	33,3 %	–	28,9 %	2,3 %	–	–	7,2 %

== Demographics ==
In 2006, there were 54,702 people living in Eimsbüttel. The population density is 16,930/km^{2} (43,848/sq mi). 10.6% were children under the age of 18, and 16.2% were 65 years of age or older. 14% were resident aliens. 2,710 people were registered as unemployed.

In 1999, there were 36,479 households, out of which 12.3% had children under the age of 18 living with them and 60.5% of all households were made up of individuals. The average household size was 1.59.

== Education ==
There were 8 elementary schools and 3 secondary schools in the quarter Eimsbüttel.

== Infrastructure ==
=== Health systems ===
There were 52 day-care centers for children, 202 physicians in private practice and 16 pharmacies.

=== Transportation ===
The quarter is serviced by the rapid transit system of the underground railway.

According to the Department of Motor Vehicles (Kraftfahrt-Bundesamt), in the quarter Eimsbüttel 16,871 private cars were registered (311 cars/1000 people). There were 244 traffic accidents total, including 205 traffic accidents with damage to persons.

== Notes ==
=== References ===
- Statistical office Hamburg and Schleswig-Holstein Statistisches Amt für Hamburg und Schleswig-Holstein, official website (in German)
