= U2 (Hamburg U-Bahn) =

Rapid transit line in Hamburg, Germany

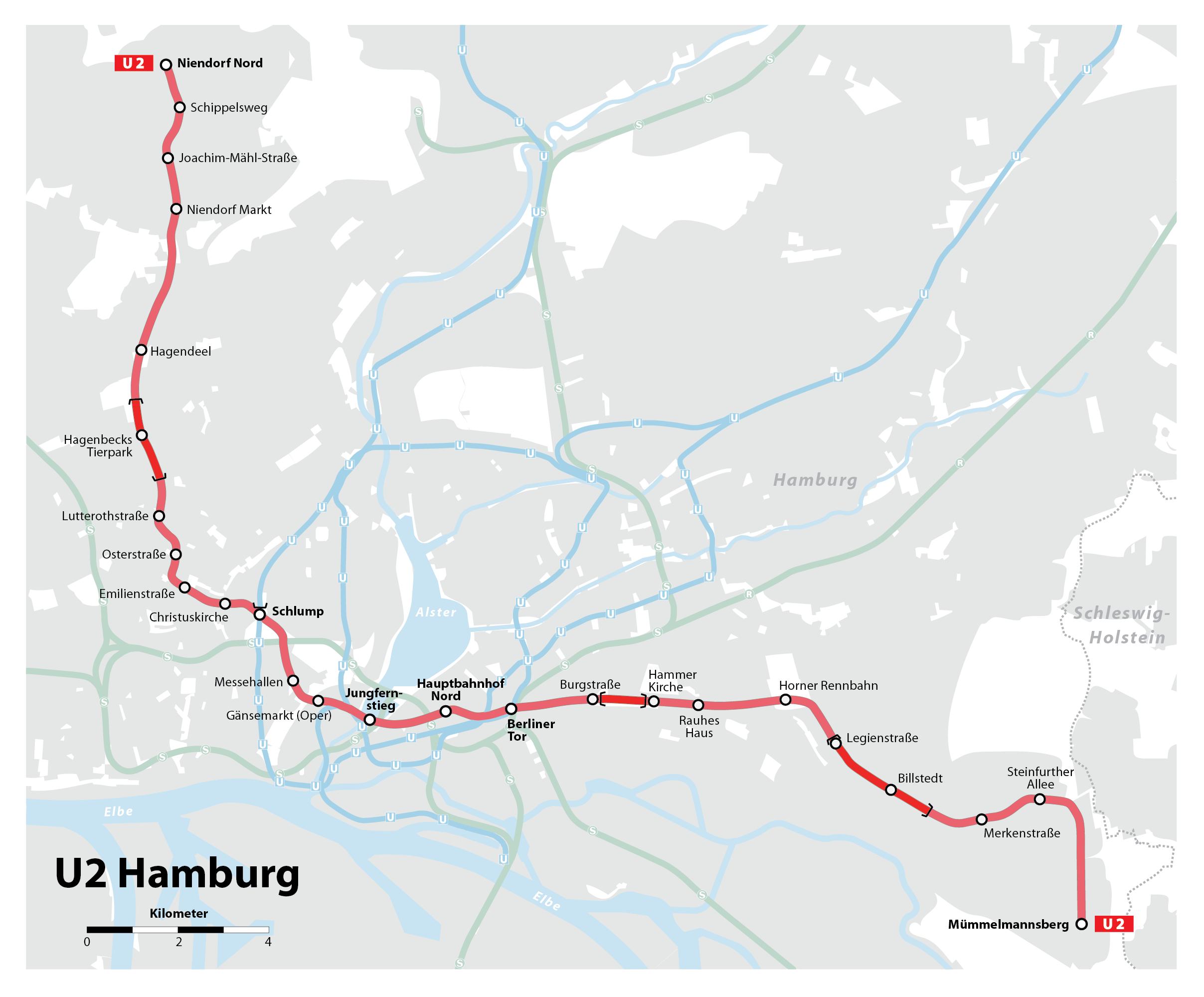

Overview
- Stations: 25

Service
- Type: Rapid transit
- System: Hamburg U-Bahn
- Operator(s): Hamburger Hochbahn

History
- Opened: 21 October 1913; 112 years ago
- Last extension: 1991

Technical
- Line length: 24.543 km (15.250 mi)
- Track gauge: 4 ft 8 1/2 in (1,435 mm)

The U2 is a line of the Hamburg U-Bahn which has a length of 24.543 kilometres (15.25 mi). It serves 25 stations. The line opened in 1913. It starts in Niendorf Nord and leads via the city center at Hauptbahnhof Nord to Mümmelmannsberg.

== History ==
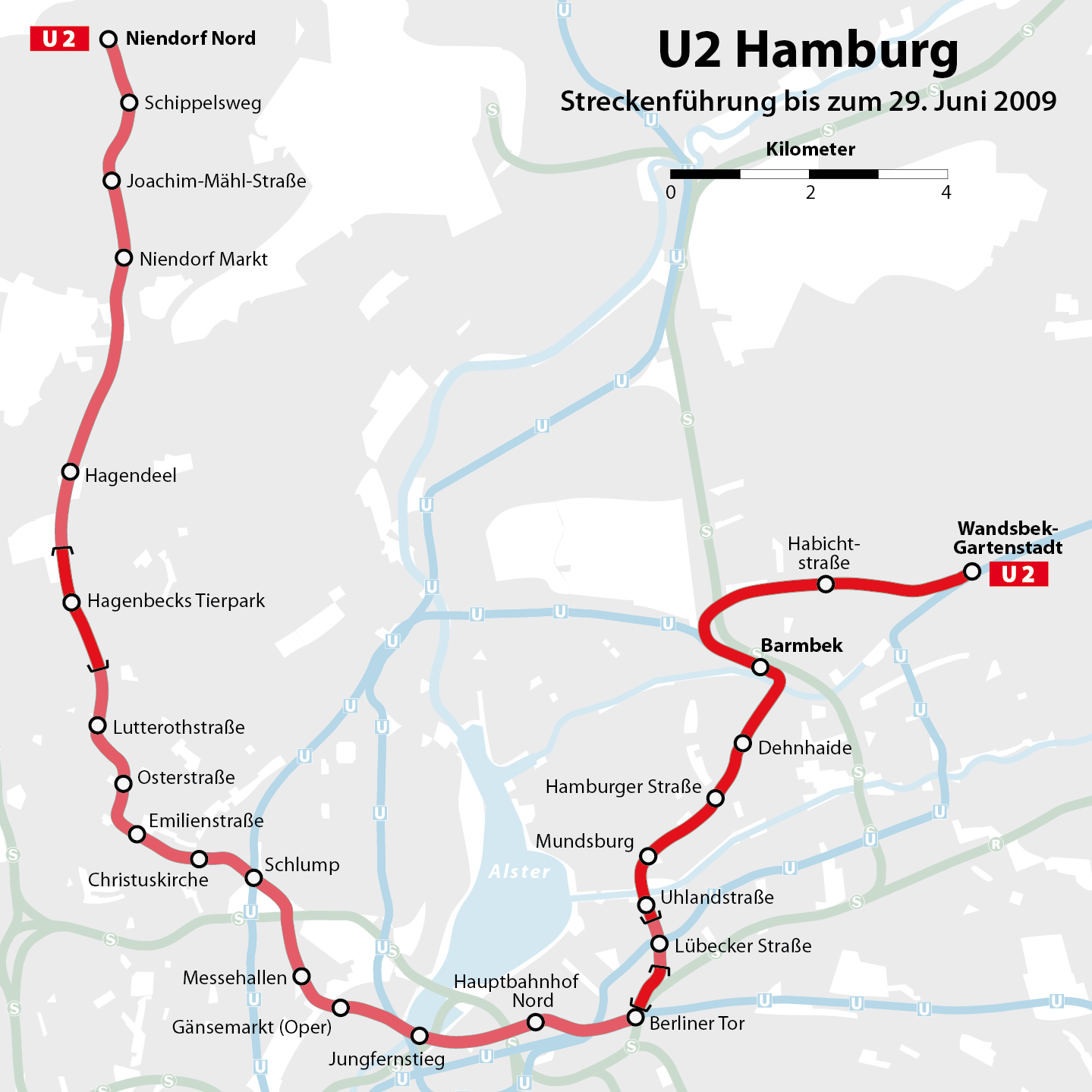
U2 before line swap in 2009

The first part of the line was opened on 21 October 1913 from Schlump to Emilienstraße. In 1914 it was extended to Hellkamp, a station which was closed and dismantled in 1964 and in 1965 replaced by new station Lutterothstraße. In 2009 eastern parts of U2 and U3 lines were swapped behind Berliner Tor. Before that, the U2 line led to Wandsbek-Gartenstadt. Since then, it ends in Mümmelmannsberg, and the U3 became a ring line again with a branch to Wandsbek-Gartenstadt.

== Opening and closing dates ==
- 21 October 1913: Schlump – Emilienstraße
- 23 May 1914: Emilienstraße – Hellkamp
- 1 May 1964: Closure of the line Schlump – Hellkamp for several months because of works at Osterstraße and abandonment of Hellkamp station
- 30 May 1965: (Schlump –) Lutterothstraße
- 30 October 1966: Lutterothstraße – Hagenbecks Tierpark
- 2 January 1967: Berliner Tor – Horner Rennbahn (as U3)
- 24 September 1967: Horner Rennbahn – Legienstraße (as U3)
- 29 September 1968: Hauptbahnhof Nord – Berliner Tor (as U21)
- 28 September 1969: Legienstraße – Billstedt (as U3)
- 31 May 1970: Billstedt – Merkenstraße (as U3)
- 31 May 1970: Schlump – Gänsemarkt (as U22)
- 3 June 1973: Gänsemarkt – Hauptbahnhof Nord
- 1 June 1985: Hagenbecks Tierpark – Niendorf Markt
- 29 September 1990: Merkenstraße – Mümmelmannsberg (as U3)
- 9 March 1991: Niendorf Markt – Niendorf Nord

== Gallery ==
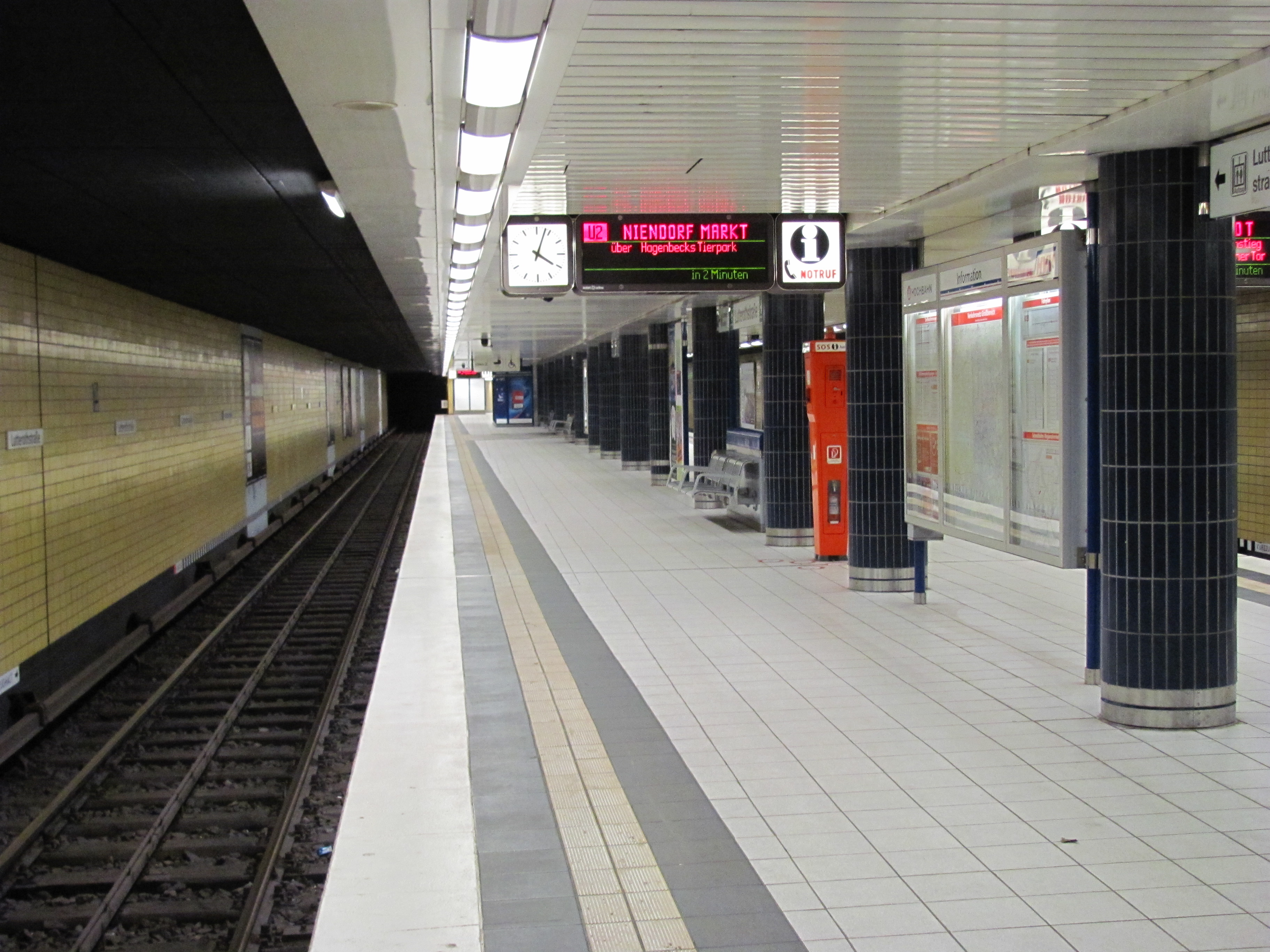
Lutterothstraße

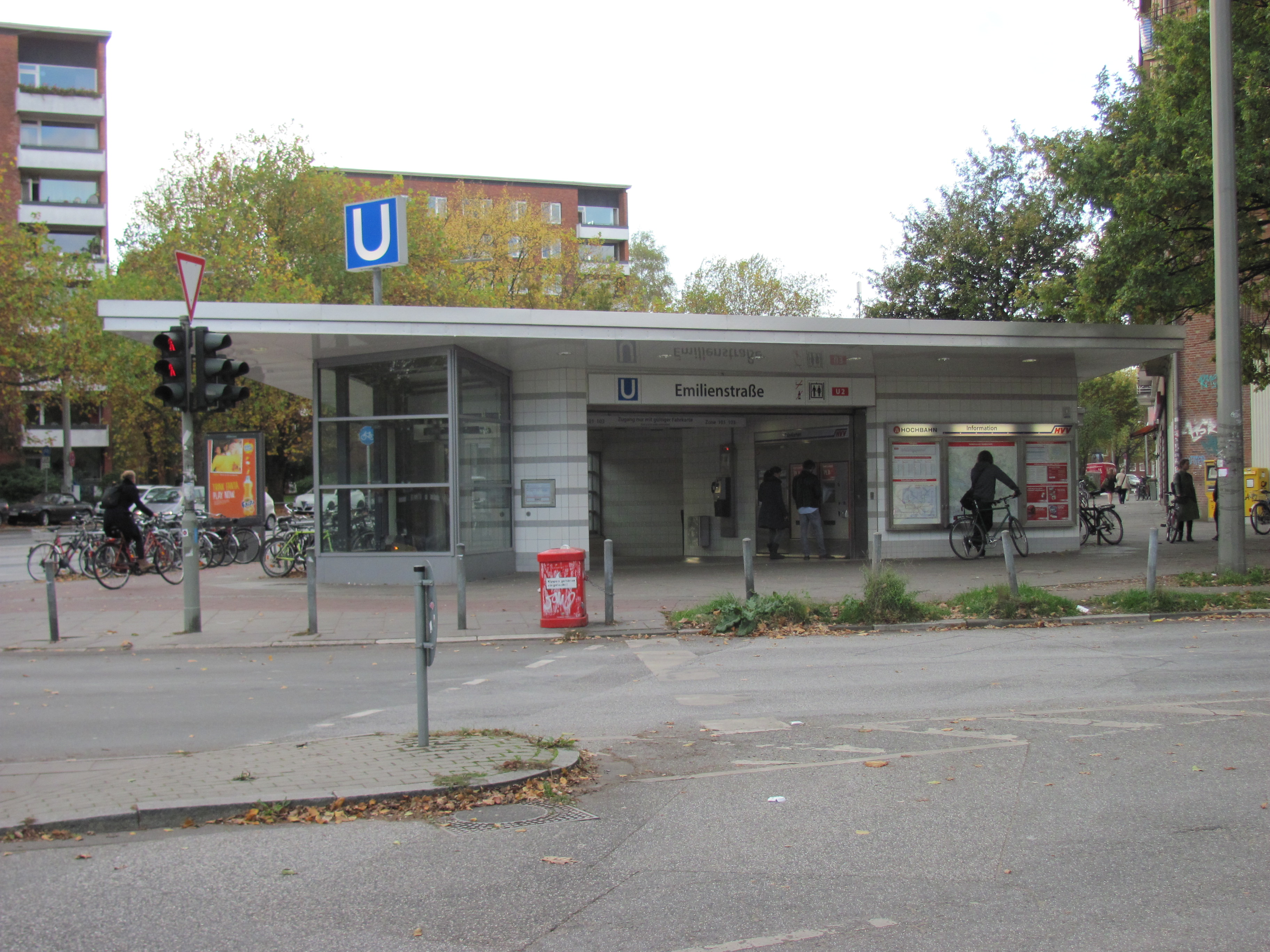
Emilienstraße

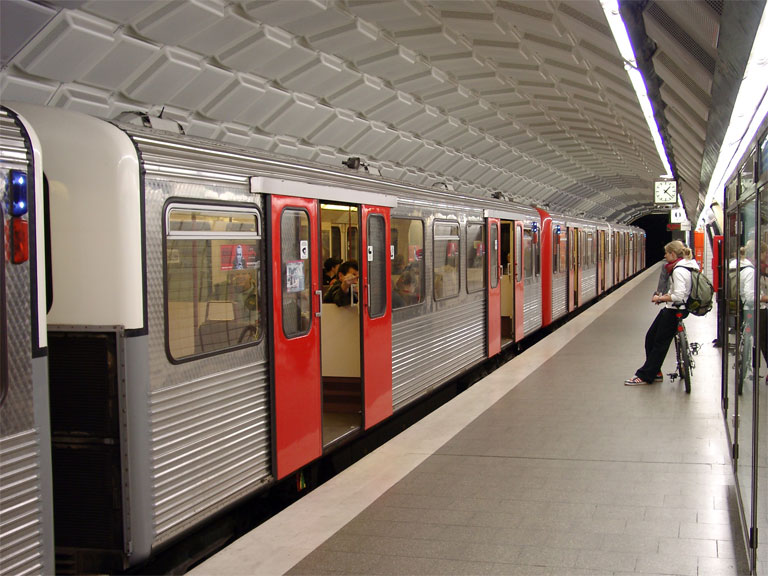
Hauptbahnhof Nord

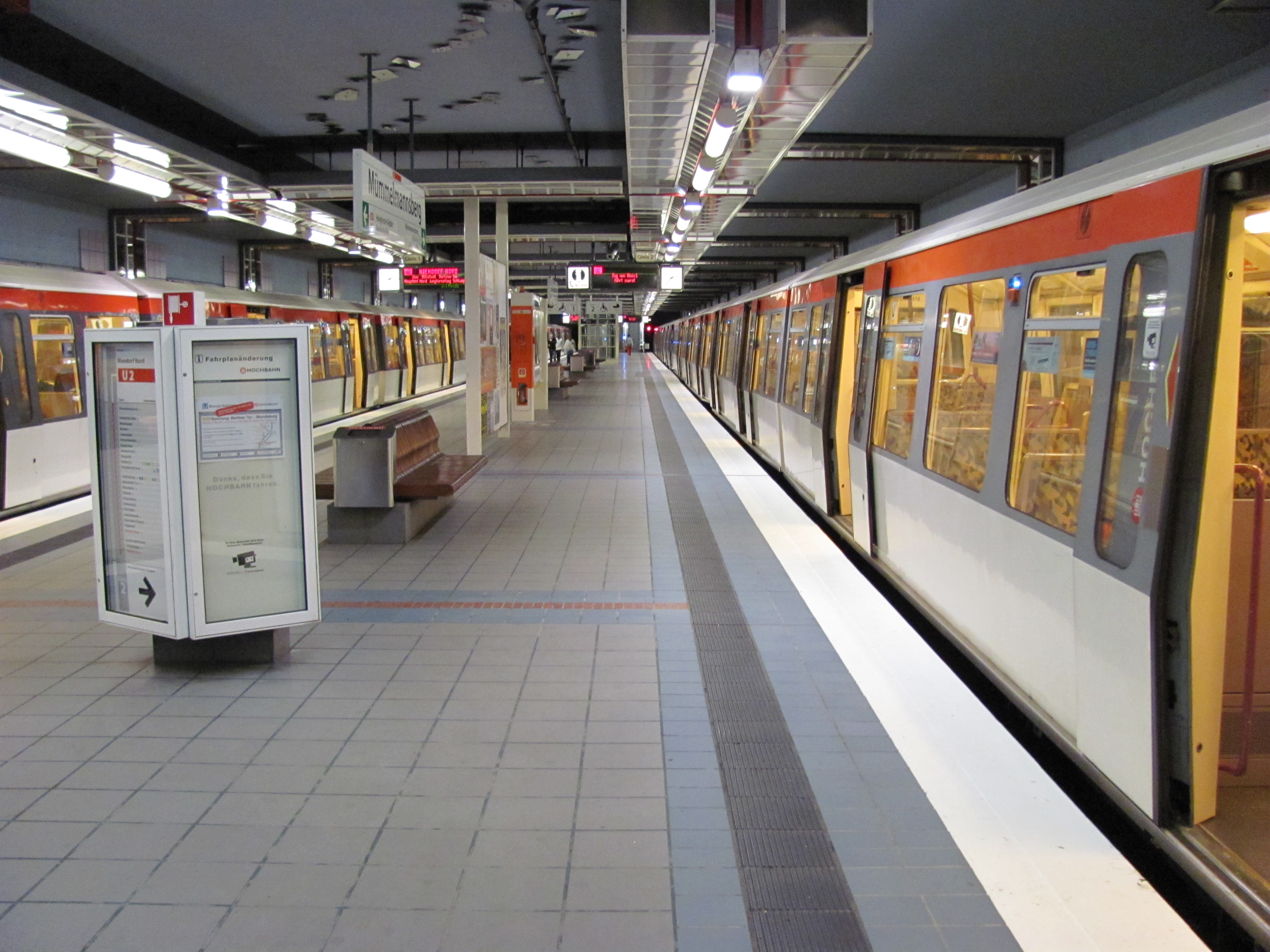
Mümmelmannsberg
