= List of railway routes in Schleswig-Holstein =

Railway routemap of Schleswig-Holstein (as of December 2017)

The List of railway routes in Schleswig-Holstein provides a list of all railway routes in Schleswig-Holstein, Germany. This includes Intercity-Express, Intercity, Regional-Express, Regionalbahn and S-Bahn services. The information is up to date to March 2025.

== Intercity services ==
Line	Route	Stock	Frequency	Operator
=== Intercity Express (ICE) ===
ICE 4	Stuttgart → Mannheim → Frankfurt Airport → Frankfurt → Hannover → Hamburg → Kiel	ICE 4	One train	DB Fernverkehr
ICE 22	Kiel – Hamburg – Hannover – Kassel-Wilhelmshöhe – Frankfurt – Mannheim – Stuttgart	ICE 1, ICE 2	5 train pairs	DB Fernverkehr
ICE 24	Westerland – Hamburg – Hanover – Kassel– Frankfurt	ICE L	One train pair	DB Fernverkehr
ICE 27	Westerland – Hamburg – Berlin – Berlin Südkreuz	ICE L	Two train pairs	DB Fernverkehr
ICE 28	Munich – Nuremberg – Leipzig – Berlin – Hamburg – Kiel	ICE 1, ICE 4	One train pair	DB Fernverkehr
ICE 33	Westerland – Hamburg – Bremen – Münster – Gelsenkirchen – Essen – Düsseldorf – Cologne	ICE L	Two train pairs	DB Fernverkehr
=== Intercity (IC) ===
IC 76	Flensburg – Padborg – Tinglev – Vamdrup – Fredericia	IC 3	Every 2 hours	DSB
=== Eurocity (EC) ===
RJ 27	Copenhagen – Schleswig / Kiel – Hamburg – Berlin – Dresden – Bad Schandau – Decin – Prague	Vectron + 9 coaches	2 train pairs from Schleswig, 1 from Kiel	DB Fernverkehr, CD
ECE 75	Hamburg – Flensburg – Padborg – Odense – Copenhagen	Vectron + 7 coaches	Every 2 hours	DB Fernverkehr

== Regional services ==
The following Regional-Express and Regionalbahn services run through Schleswig-Holstein:

Line	Route	KBS	Frequency	Material	Operator	Image
A1	Ulzburg Süd – Tanneneck – Ellerau – Quickborn – Quickborn Süd – Hasloh – Bönningstedt – Burgwedel – Schnelsen – Hörgensweg – Eidelstedt Zentrum – Eidelstedt	103	20 min	LHB VT 2E, LINT	AKN Eisenbahn	
A2	Neumünster – Neumünster Süd – Boostedt – Großenaspe – Wiemersdorf – Bad Bramstedt – Bad Bramstedt Kurhaus – Lentföhrden – Nützen – Dodenhof – Holstentherme – Kaltenkirchen – Kaltenkirchen Süd – Henstedt-Ulzburg − Ulzburg Süd – Meeschensee – Haslohfurth – Quickborner Straße – Friedrichsgabe – Moorbekhalle – Norderstedt Mitte	103, 138	20 min	LHB VT 2E, LINT	AKN Eisenbahn	
A3	Elmshorn – Langenmoor – Sparrieshoop – Bokholt – Voßloch – Barmstedt Brunnenstraße – Barmstedt – Langeln – Alveslohe – Henstedt-Ulzburg – Ulzburg Süd	139	60 min	LHB VT 2E, LINT	AKN Eisenbahn	
RE 1 Hanse-Express	Hamburg Hauptbahnhof – Hamburg-Bergedorf – Schwarzenbek – Müssen – Büchen – Schwanheide – Boizenburg (Elbe) – Brahlstorf – Pritzier – Hagenow Land – Schwerin Süd – Schwerin Mitte – Schwerin Hauptbahnhof – Bad Kleinen – Ventschow – Blankenberg (Meckl) – Bützow – Schwaan – Rostock Hauptbahnhof	100	120 min	Bombardier Traxx P160 AC2 (class 146.3) + 5 double-deck coaches	DB Regio Nordost	
RE 4 Stadttore-Linie	Lübeck Hauptbahnhof - Lübeck St Jürgen - Herrnburg - Lüdersdorf (Meckl) - Schönberg (Meckl) - Grieben (Meckl) - Grevesmühlen - Plüschow - Bobitz - Bad Kleinen - Ventschow - Blankenberg (Meckl) - Bützow - Güstrow - Priemerburg - Lalendorf - Neu Wokern - Teterow Malchin - Reuterstadt Stavenhagen - Kleeth - Neubrandenburg - Sponholz - Neetzka - Oertzenhof - Strasburg (Uckermark) - Blumenhagen - Pasewalk - Pasewalk Ost - Zerrenthin - Löcknitz - Grambow - Szczecin Gumieńce - Szczecin Główny branch line: Pasewalk - Sandförde - Jatznick - Torgelow - Eggesin - Hoppenwalde - Ueckermünde - Ueckermünde Stadthafen	175	60 min	Alstom Coradia LINT 41 (class 623) 2 × LINT 41 (Lübeck–Bad Kleinen)	DB Regio Nordost	
RE 6 RE 60	Hamburg-Altona – Elmshorn – Itzehoe – Heide (Holst) – Lunden – Friedrichstadt – Husum – Bredstedt – Langenhorn (Schlesw) – Niebüll – Klanxbüll – Morsum – Keitum – Westerland (Sylt)	130	60 min	Class 245 + married-pair coaches	DB Regio Nord	
RE 7	Hamburg Hauptbahnhof – Hamburg Dammtor – Elmshorn – Neumünster – Einfeld – Bordesholm – Flintbek – Kiel Hauptbahnhof branch line: Neumünster - Nortorf - Rendsburg - Owschlag - Schleswig - Jübek - Tarp - Flensburg		60 min	Twindexx Vario (class 445)	DB Regio Nord	
RE 8	Hamburg Hauptbahnhof – Bad Oldesloe – Reinfeld (Holst) – Lübeck Hauptbahnhof – Lübeck-Dänischburg IKEA – Lübeck-Kücknitz – Lübeck-Travem. Skandinavienkai – Lübeck-Travemünde Hafen – Lübeck-Travemünde Strand	104	60 min	Twindexx Vario (class 445)	DB Regio Nord	
RE 70	Hamburg Hauptbahnhof – Hamburg Dammtor – Elmshorn – Wrist – Brokstedt – Neumünster – Bordesholm – Kiel Hauptbahnhof	131	60 min	Twindexx Vario (class 445) Class 112 + 6 double-deck coaches	DB Regio Nord	
RE 72	Kiel Hauptbahnhof – Suchsdorf – Gettorf – Eckernförde	60 min (Mon–Fri; peak)	146	1–2 × Stadler Flirt battery	nordbahn	
RE 72	Boren-Lindaunis Schleibrücke Nord – Flensburg	60 min	146	1–2 × Stadler Flirt battery	nordbahn	
RE 74	Kiel Hauptbahnhof – Felde – Rendsburg – Owschlag – Schleswig – Jübek – Husum	134	60 min	1–2 × Stadler Flirt battery	nordbahn	
RE 80	Hamburg Hauptbahnhof – Ahrensburg – Bad Oldesloe – Reinfeld (Holst) – Lübeck Hauptbahnhof	104	60 min	Twindexx Vario (class 445)	DB Regio Nord	
RE 83	Kiel Hauptbahnhof – Raisdorf – Preetz – Plön – Bad Malente-Gremsmühlen – Eutin – Bad Schwartau – Lübeck Hauptbahnhof – Lübeck Hochschulstadtteil – Lübeck Flughafen – Ratzeburg – Mölln (Lauenb) – Büchen – Lauenburg (Elbe) – Echem – Lüneburg	145	60 min	1–2 × Stadler Flirt battery	Erixx	
RB 61	Hamburg Hauptbahnhof – Hamburg Dammtor – Pinneberg – Prisdorf – Tornesch – Elmshorn – Herzhorn – Glückstadt – Krempe – Kremperheide – Itzehoe	130	60 min	Stadler Flirt	nordbahn	
RB 62	Heide (Holst) – Meldorf – St Michaelisdonn – Burg (Dithm) – Wilster – Itzehoe	130	60 min	Alstom Coradia LINT (class 622)	DB Regio Nord	
RB 63	Neumünster – Neumünster Stadtwald – Wasbek – Aukrug – Hohenwestedt – Osterstedt – Beringstedt – Gokels – Hademarschen – Beldorf – Albersdorf – Nordhastedt – Heide (Holst) – Tiebensee – Jarrenwisch – Wesselburen – Süderdeich – Reinsbüttel – Büsum	132	60 min	Stadler Flirt battery	nordbahn	
RB 64	Husum – Witzwort – Harblek – Tönning – Kating – Katharinenheerd – Garding – Sandwehle – Tating – Bad St Peter Süd – Bad St Peter-Ording	135	60 min	Stadler Flirt battery	nordbahn	
RB 65	Niebüll – Deezbüll – Maasbüll (b Niebüll) – Dagebüll Kirche – Dagebüll Mole	136	60 min	Class 5047, Class 629/628	Norddeutsche Eisenbahn Niebüll	
RB 66	Niebüll – Uphusum – Süderlügum – Tønder – Tønder Nord – Visby – Bredebro – Døstrup Sønderjylland – Skærbæk – Brøns – Rejsby – Hviding – Ribe – Ribe Nørremark – Gredstedbro – Sejstrup – Bramming – Tjæreborg – Esbjerg	136.1	60 min	Class 5047, Class 629/628	Norddeutsche Eisenbahn Niebüll (in behalf of Arriva)	
RB 71	Hamburg-Altona – Pinneberg – Elmshorn – Wrist (– Kellinghusen)/ – Itzehoe	131	60 min	Stadler Flirt	nordbahn	
RB 73	Kiel Hauptbahnhof – Kiel-Hassee CITTI-PARK – Kronshagen – Suchsdorf – Gettorf – Eckernförde	146	60 min	Alstom Coradia LINT (class 648)	nordbahn	
RB 75	Kiel Hauptbahnhof – Kiel-Hassee CITTI-PARK – Kiel-Russee – Melsdorf – Achterwehr – Felde – Bredenbek – Schülldorf – Rendsburg	134	60 min	Stadler Flirt	nordbahn	
RB 76	Kiel Hauptbahnhof – Kiel Schulen am Langsee – Kiel-Ellerbek – Kiel-Oppendorf	133	60 min	Stadler Flirt battery	Erixx	
RB 81	Hamburg Hauptbahnhof – Hamburg Hasselbrook – Hamburg-Tonndorf – Hamburg-Rahlstedt – Ahrensburg – Ahrensburg-Gartenholz – Bargteheide – Kupfermühle – Bad Oldesloe	104		Class 112 + double-deck coaches	DB Regio Nord	
RB 82	Bad Oldesloe – Fresenburg – Wakendorf – Altengörs – Bad Segeberg – Fahrenkrug – Wahlstedt – Rickling – Neumünster Süd AKN – Neumünster	142	60 min	Stadler Flirt	nordbahn	
RB 84	Kiel Hauptbahnhof – Kiel-Elmschenhagen – Raisdorf – Preetz – Ascheberg (Holst) – Plön – Bad Malente-Gremsmühlen – Eutin – Pönitz (Holst) – Pansdorf – Bad Schwartau – Lübeck Hauptbahnhof	145	60 min	Stadler Flirt battery	Erixx	
RB 85	Lübeck Hauptbahnhof – Bad Schwartau – Timmendorfer Strand – Scharbeutz – Haffkrug – Sierksdorf - Neustadt (Holst)	140	60 min	Class 218 + double-deck coaches Class 648	DB Regio Nord	
RB 86 (RE 86)	Lübeck Hbf – Lübeck-Travemünde Skandinavienkai – Lübeck-Travemünde Strand	104	60 min (Sat–Sun; April–October)	Twindexx Vario (class 445)	DB Regio Nord	

== Hamburg S-Bahn ==
Line	Route	KBS	Operator	Images
S2	Altona; Holstenstraße; Sternschanze; Dammtor; Stadthausbrücke; Jungfernstieg; Hauptbahnhof; Berliner Tor; Rothenburgsort; Tiefstack; Billwerder-Moorfleet; Mittlerer Landweg; Allermöhe; Nettelnburg; Bergedorf; Reinbek; Wohltorf; Aumühle	100	S-Bahn Hamburg	
S3	Pinneberg; Thesdorf; Halstenbek; Krupunder; Elbgaustraße; Eidelstedt; Stellingen; Langenfelde; Diebsteich; Altona; Königstraße; Reeperbahn; Landungsbrücken; Stadthausbrücke; Jungfernstieg; Hauptbahnhof; Hammerbrook (City Süd); Elbbrücken; Veddel (BallinStadt); Wilhelmsburg; Harburg; Harburg Rathaus; Heimfeld; Neuwiedenthal; Neugraben	130	S-Bahn Hamburg	

== See also ==
- List of scheduled railway routes in Germany
