= Bordesholm station =

Passenger station in Bordesholm, Schleswig-Holstein, Germany

Bordesholm
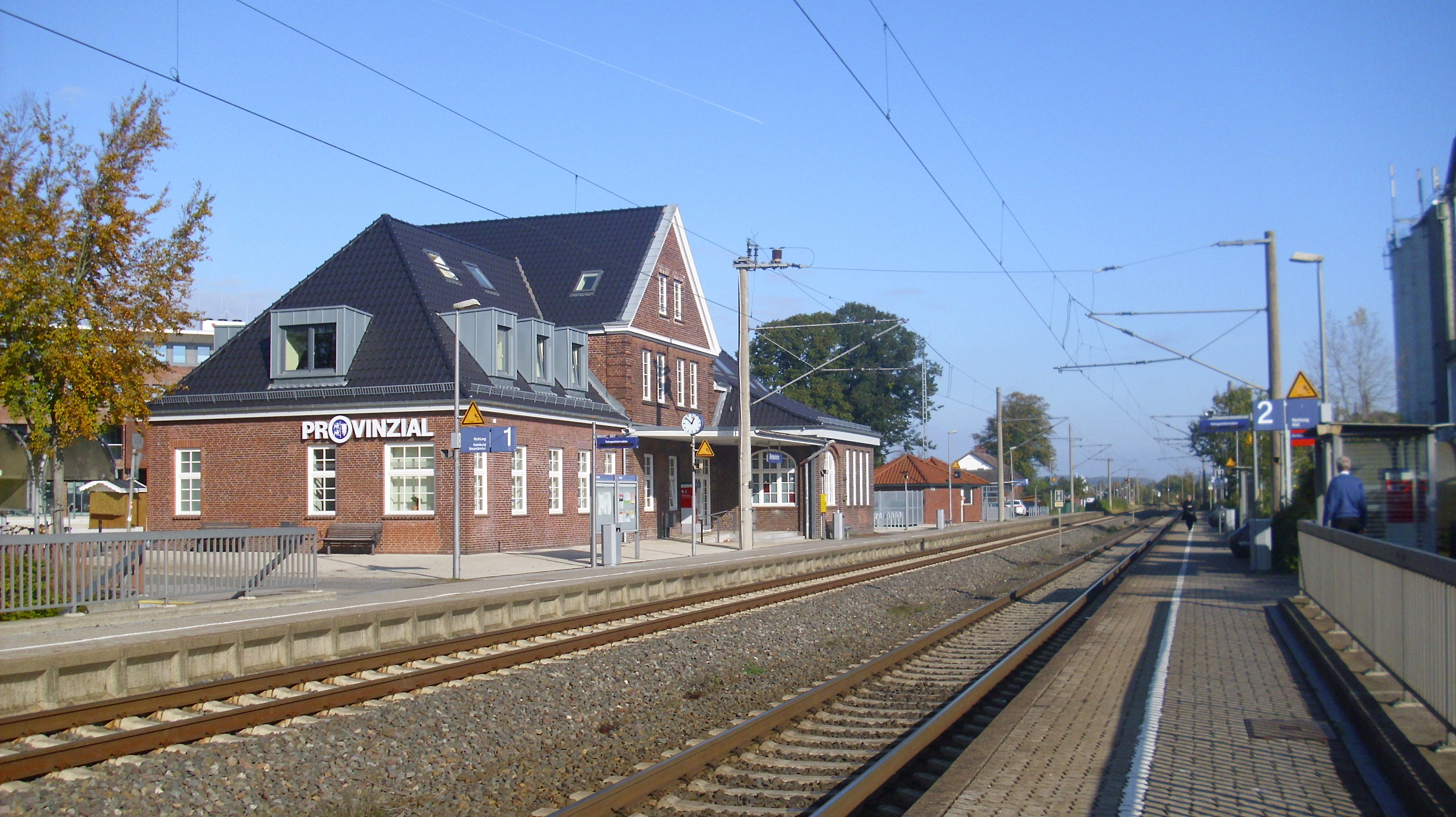

General information
- Location: Bordesholm, Schleswig-Holstein; Germany
- Coordinates: 54°10′28″N 10°2′37″E
- Lines: Hamburg–Kiel (86.6 km) (KBS 103)
- Platforms: 2

Construction
- Accessible: Yes

Other information
- Station code: 778
- DS100 code: ABRD
- Category: 5
- Website: www.bahnhof.de

History
- Opened: 18 September 1844

Passengers
- 477,000
Location

Bordesholm station is a passenger station in the centre of Bordesholm (in the district of Rendsburg-Eckernförde) in the German state of Schleswig-Holstein. It is on the Hamburg-Altona–Kiel railway. The station is now mainly used by commuters.

== History ==
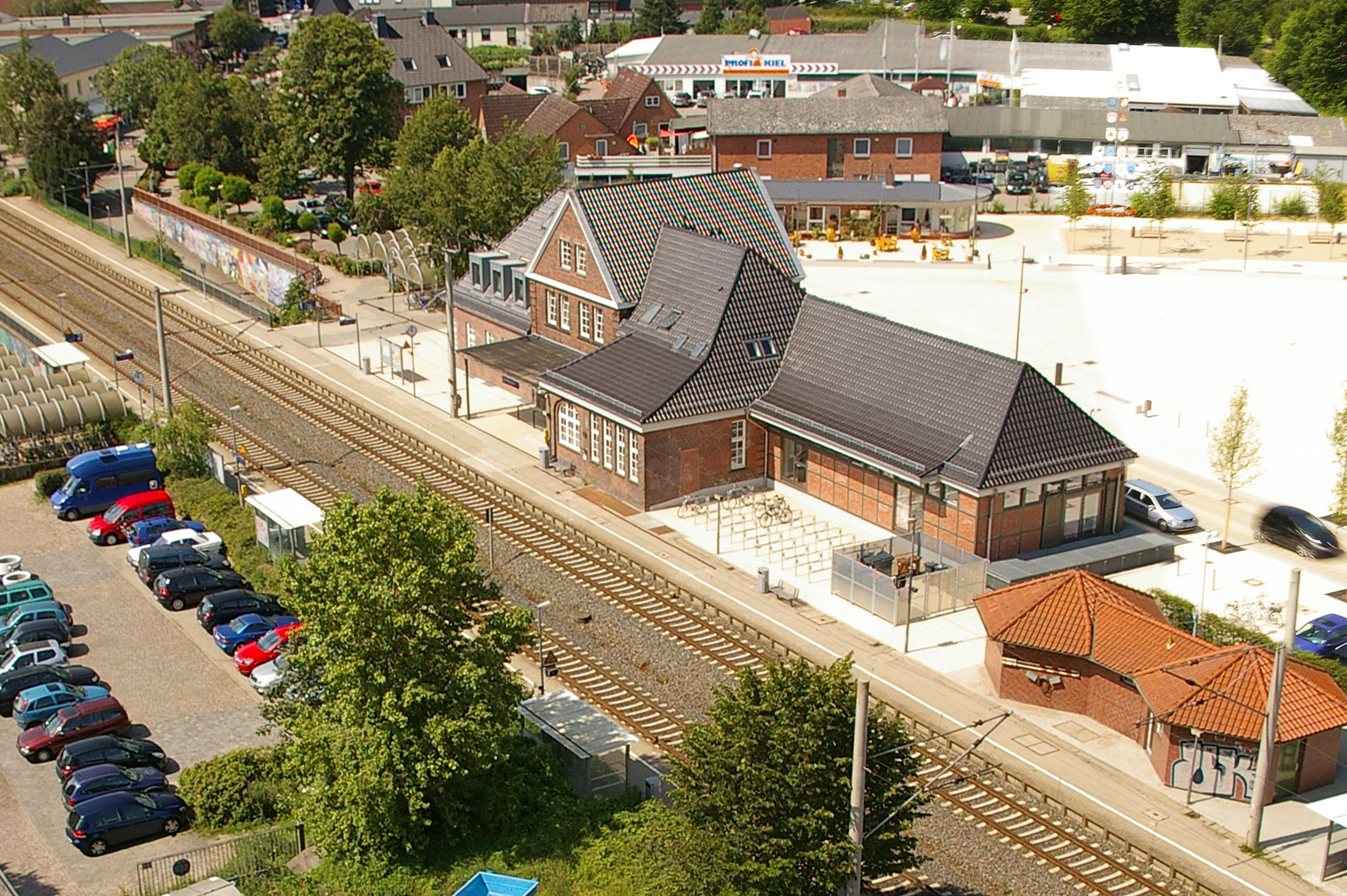
Station complex in village centre

The station was opened in September 1844, together with the railway line. The station, which was located in the municipality of Eiderstede, was first called Bordesholm (Bahnhof Bordesholm in German) and later renamed Bordesholm-Bahnhof (to indicate that it was the station serving Bordesholm, which was a bigger town than Eiderstede). In the early days two passenger trains and a freight train ran in both directions each day. Running time was 27 minutes between Bordesholm and Kiel and 17 minutes between Bordesholm and Neumünster. When the railway was opened there was still no station building there, but it was expected to be built—as noted in the annual report for 1844—and the plans had been submitted for approval. The first station building, a small single-storey brick building, stood approximately at the current location of the stairs down to the pedestrian tunnel. In addition to passengers, it handled the transshipment of the rapidly developing freight as well as livestock transport.

In 1895, the Bordesholm–Neumünster section was duplicated. This accounted for the retention of the stop for passenger trains in Bordesholm. As early as 1899, plans were discussed for the demolition of the station.

=== In the 20th century ===
Shortly before the First World War, the core of the present building was erected. Until the 1920s there was a siding to a gravel pit between Reesdorf and Techelsdorf. Later there was a truck road to a gravel loading facility north of the station. In 1936, the existing signalbox of Max Jüdel design was replaced by a lever frame signalbox. The signalling in Einfeld, Bordesholm, Techelsdorf and Flintbek were also modified in the mid 1930s. In the Second World War, the station had a prisoner of war camp run by Deutsche Reichsbahn. Because of the short staffing at the station in 1942, the mayor called for prisoners to be held there to handle freight.

In the 1960s, the station was equipped with a new loading ramp, which was also used by the military for the loading of vehicles. A Köf II light locomotive was stationed for station operations. In 1964, an extension of the station building was put into operation with a ticket office, waiting room and station restaurant. From 1986, the stations tracks were dismantled and a level access was provided to the platform next to the station building and the island platform was rebuilt so that it could be reached via an underpass. On 3 November 1992, the first stanchion for the electrification in Schleswig-Holstein was ceremoniously installed in Bordesholm. In October 1994, the signal box was decommissioned and since then the station has had only two running lines with a crossover.

=== In the 21st century ===
In 2003, the station building, which was built in 1911, was sold as part of its reconstruction. By the summer of 2008, it had been renovated for €600,000 and had a passenger information system. Since 2004, a sculpture called Der Prophet des Kieler (the Prophet of Kiel) by the artist Zdenek Chmelar has been located in front of the station building.

== Rail services ==
The station is served by the following services:

Train class	Route	Frequency
RE 7	Kiel – Flintbek – Bordesholm – Einfeld–| Flensburg – Rendsburg –| Neumünster – Elmshorn – Hamburg-Dammtor – Hamburg Hbf	Hourly
RE 70	Kiel – Bordesholm – Neumünster – Brokstedt – Wrist – Elmshorn – Pinneberg – Hamburg-Dammtor – Hamburg Hbf	Hourly

Bordesholm is served by two Regional-Express services each hour. It is possible to reach Hamburg Hauptbahnhof in an hour, Neumünster in nine minutes and Kiel in twelve minutes. Deutsche Bahn operates on the line using two Bombardier Twindexx (class 445) sets.
