= RB 86 =

RB 86 is the designation of several regional rail services in Germany:

- RB 86, operated by DB Regio Nord between Göttingen and Einbeck Mitte
- RB 86, operated by DB Regio Nord between Lübeck and Lübeck-Travemünde Strand
- RB 86, operated by Go-Ahead Bayern between Dinkelscherben and Munich
- RB 86, operated by VIAS between Hanau and Groß-Umstadt-Wiebelsbach
