= Ascheberg (Holst) station =

Railway station in Germany

Ascheberg (Holst)
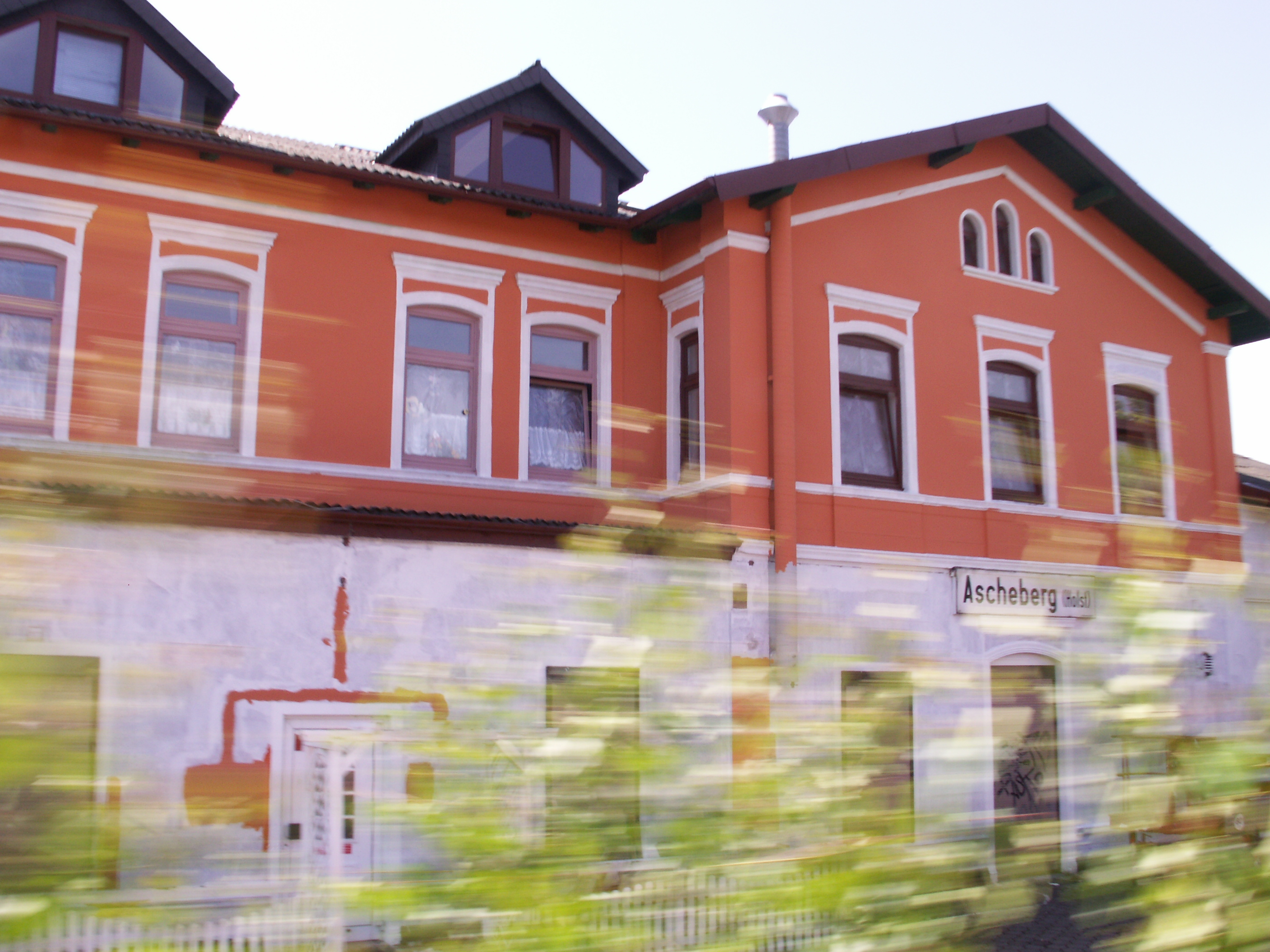
- 2007

General information
- Location: Bahnhofstraße 8; 24326 Ascheberg (Holstein); Schleswig-Holstein; Germany
- Coordinates: 54°08′55″N 10°20′26″E
- Owner: Deutsche Bahn
- Operator: DB Netz; DB Station&Service
- Lines: Kiel–Lübeck railway (KBS 145); Neumünster–Ascheberg railway (KBS 148)
- Platforms: 1 island platform
- Tracks: 2
- Train operators: Erixx
- Connections: RE 83; RB 84; 360 361 362 363 364

Construction
- Parking: yes
- Cycle facilities: yes
- Accessible: no

Other information
- Station code: 191
- DS100 code: AAG
- IBNR: 8000011
- Category: 5
- Fare zone: NAH.SH
- Website: www.bahnhof.de

Services
Preceding station		Following station
Preetz towards Kiel Hbf	RE 83 selected trains only	Plön towards Lüneburg
Preetz towards Kiel Hbf	RB 84	Plön towards Lübeck Hbf
Location
- Location within Schleswig-Holstein Location within Germany Location within Europe

Ascheberg (Holst) station (German: Bahnhof Ascheberg (Holst)) is a railway station in the municipality of Ascheberg (Holstein), located in the Plön district in Schleswig-Holstein, Germany.

== Notable places nearby ==
- Großer Plöner See
