= Brokstedt station =

Railway station in Germany

Brokstedt
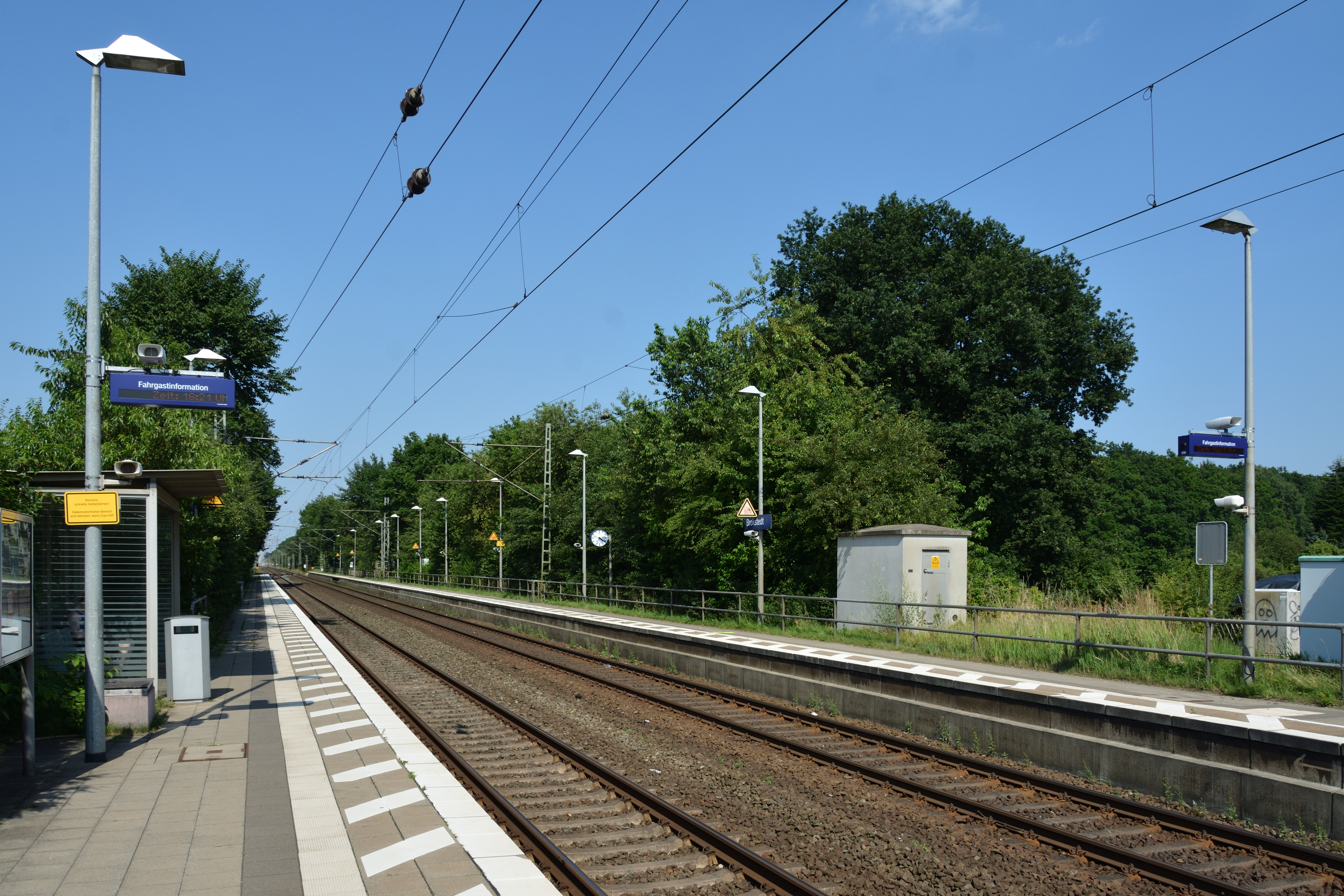
- 2014

General information
- Location: Osterfeld 1; 24616 Brokstedt; Schleswig-Holstein; Germany
- Coordinates: 53.9898°N 9.8233°E
- Owner: Deutsche Bahn
- Operator: DB Netz; DB Station&Service
- Lines: Hamburg-Altona–Kiel railway (KBS 103)
- Platforms: 2 side platforms
- Tracks: 2
- Train operators: DB Regio Nord
- Connections: 6552 7506 7508

Construction
- Parking: yes
- Cycle facilities: yes
- Accessible: yes

Other information
- Station code: 895
- DS100 code: ABRS
- IBNR: 8001190
- Category: 6
- Fare zone: NAH.SH
- Website: www.bahnhof.de

Services
Preceding station	DB Regio Nord	Following station
Neumünster towards Kiel Hbf	RE 70	Wrist towards Hamburg Hbf
Location
- Location within Schleswig-Holstein Location within Germany Location within Europe

Brokstedt station (German: Bahnhof Brokstedt) is a railway station in the municipality of Brokstedt, located in the Steinburg district in Schleswig-Holstein, Germany.
