= RB 81 =

RB 81 is the designation of several regional rail services in Germany:

- RB 81, operated by DB Regio Bayern between Steinach (b Rothenburg o. d. Tauber) and Neustadt (Aisch)
- RB 81, operated by DB Regio Mitte between Trier and Koblenz
- RB 81, operated by DB Regio Nord between Bodenfelde and Nordhausen
- RB 81, operated by DB Regio Nord between Hamburg and Bad Oldesloe
- RB 81, operated by Erzgebirgsbahn between Chemnitz and Olbernhau-Grünthal
- RB 81, operated by VIAS between Darmstadt and Eberbach
