= Battle of Stellau =

1201 battle

The Battle of Stellau
- Part of the Danish Crusades
Date	1201
Location	Wrist, Germany
Result	Danish victory
Territorial changes	Holstein becomes a county of Denmark

Belligerents
Denmark	Holstein

Commanders and leaders
Valdemar II	Adolf III of Holstein (POW)

Strength
~2,000–4,000	~3,000

Casualties and losses
Minor losses	Entire force annihilated

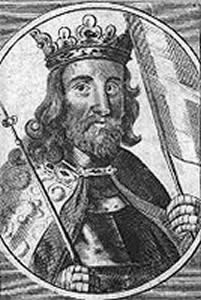
Imaginary portrait of King Valdemar II of Denmark

The Battle of Stellau took place in the year 1201 near the village of Stellau near Wrist, in the German state of Schleswig-Holstein.

A German army led by Count Adolf III of Holstein fought a Danish army under King Canute VI of Denmark. Duke Valdemar of Schleswig, supporting the interests of his brother, the Danish King, defeated Adolf and his forces from Holstein.

== History ==
After Adolf III of Holstein returned to Europe from the Third Crusade in 1197, a disagreement between him and the Danish King Canute VI broke out on the island of Rügen in 1200, followed by an armed conflict in Dithmarschen.

Duke Valdemar of Schleswig ordered his army to prepare for war and side with Denmark, ruled by his brother. Adolf led his German army from Holstein to battle in Stellau and crushed the Danes. However, when Adolf and his forces pulled back toward the city of Hamburg, he was besieged, defeated, and captured by Valdemar.

In 1202, Valdemar of Schleswig became King Valdemar II of Denmark. His imprisonment of Adolf continued until 1203, when due to an illness, he was freed by the new king on the condition that he waive all claims to Holstein. Adolf withdrew to his ancestral seat, Schaumburg Castle, where he remained until his death in 1225.

After this battle, Valdemar acquired the nicknamed "the Conqueror," and maintained his hegemony over the north German coast, including Holstein. His authority continued until the Battle of Bornhöved in 1227, where he was defeated by Adolf IV of Holstein, the son of Adolf III.

A Romanesque stone church consecrated in 1230 by Archbishop Gebhard II of Bremen now marks the historic battle site in Stellau.

== Sources ==
- von Liliencron, Detlev. "Die Schlacht bei Stellau 1201". Projekt Gutenberg–DE. Archived from the original on 2 May 2003. (German)
