= Bad Oldesloe station =

Railway station in Bad Oldesloe, Germany

Bad Oldesloe
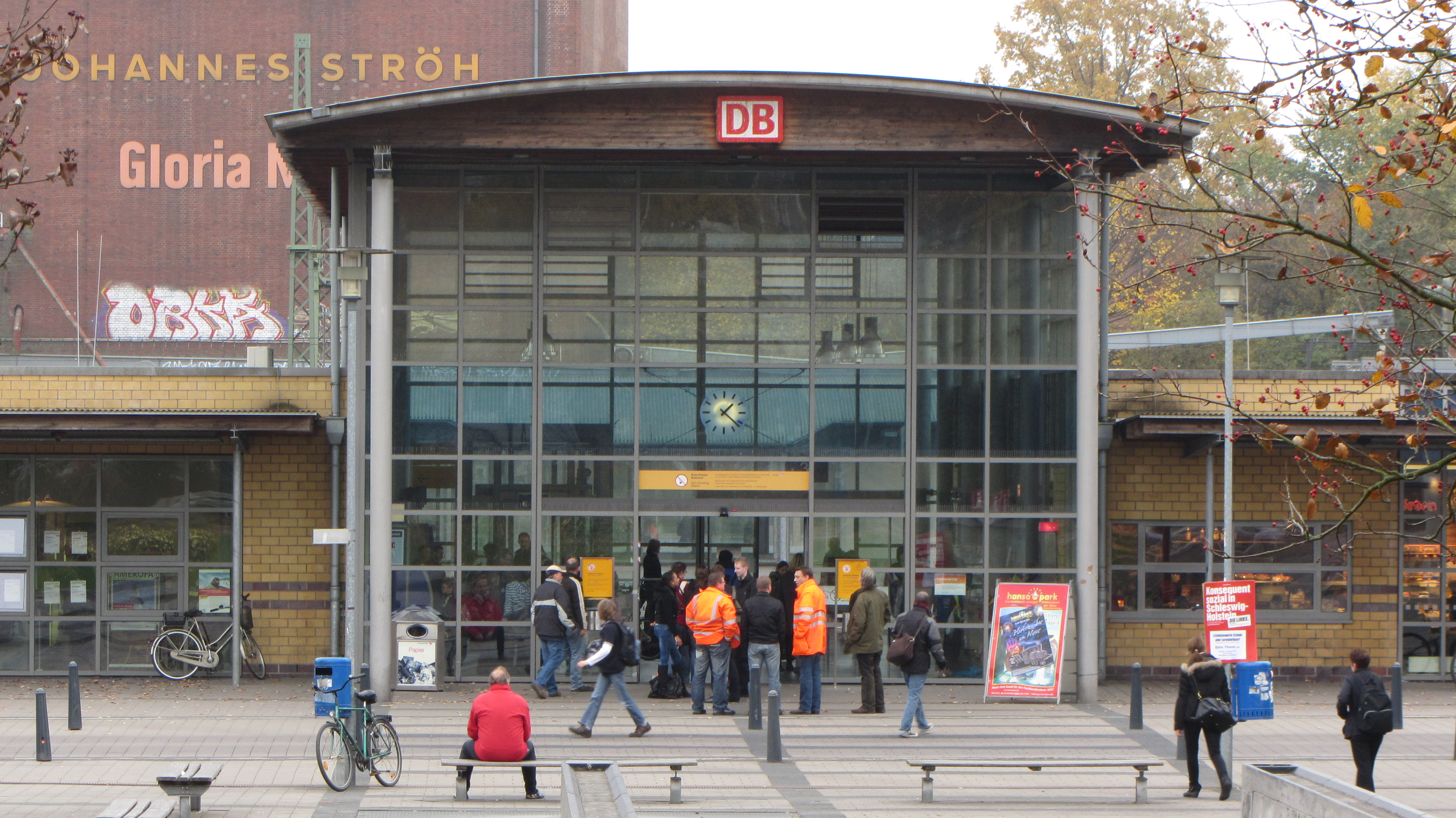
- Western entrance

General information
- Location: Käthe-Kollwitz-Str. 8, Bad Oldesloe, Schleswig-Holstein; Germany
- Coordinates: 53°48′19″N 10°22′58″E
- Owner: Deutsche Bahn
- Operator: DB Station&Service
- Lines: Lübeck–Hamburg railway; Neumünster–Bad Oldesloe railway; Hagenow Land–Bad Oldesloe railway (closed); Schwarzenbek–Bad Oldesloe railway (closed); Elmshorn–Bad Oldesloe railway (closed)
- Platforms: 4
- Connections: 7141 8101 8102 8103 8104 8105 8110 8115 8120 8121 8122 8140 8142 8145 8146 8160 8170 8171 8180 8182 8740

Construction
- Accessible: Yes

Other information
- Station code: 317
- DS100 code: AO
- IBNR: 8000023
- Category: 2
- Fare zone: HVV: D/705
- Website: www.bahnhof.de

History
- Opened: 1 August 1865; 161 years ago
- Electrified: 13 December 2008; 17 years ago, 15 kV 16 2/3 Hz AC system (overhead)

Services
Preceding station	DB Regio Nord	Following station
Hamburg Hbf towards Bremerhaven-Lehe	RE 8	Reinfeld (Holst) towards Hannover Hbf
Ahrensburg towards Hamburg Hbf	RE 80	Reinfeld (Holst) towards Lübeck Hbf
Kupfermühle towards Hamburg Hbf	RB 81	Terminus
Preceding station		Following station
Fresenburg towards Neumünster	RB 82	Terminus
Location

Bad Oldesloe station is the main railway station in the town of Bad Oldesloe, located in the German state of Schleswig-Holstein. DB Station&Service assigns it to category 2. It is located on the Lübeck–Hamburg railway, which was opened in 1865. The station has been a rail junction since 1875, when the branch to Neumünster went into operation. The Hagenow Land–Bad Oldesloe and Schwarzenbek–Bad Oldesloe railways followed in 1887 and 1897, but have since been closed. The track of the Elmshorn–Bad Oldesloe railway is only used as an industrial connecting track to Blumendorf for freight. Local public transport is operated by the Stadtwerke Bad Oldesloe, the municipal utility.

== History ==
The station was opened with the Hamburg-Lübeck railway by the Lübeck-Büchen Railway Company (Lübeck-Büchener Eisenbahn, LBE) on 1 August 1865. The station became a branch station on 10 December 1875 with the building of the line to Neumünster by the Altona-Kiel Railway Company (Altona-Kieler Eisenbahn-Gesellschaft). The Altona-Kiel Railway Company was taken over 1884 by the Prussian state railways and it opened a line to Schwarzenbek on 1 August 1887. The line to Ratzeburg was put into operation on 15 August 1897, also by the Prussian state railways. Both lines crossed the line to Hamburg to the south of the station on flyovers.

Operations of the Elmshorn–Bad Oldesloe railway began on 9 June 1907. The station was built as an Inselbahnhof ("island station", that is the station building was surrounded by rail tracks) to handle the increase of traffic. The Prussian state railways tracks were in the north-western part of the station, while the LBE's were in the southeastern part. This separation ended with the nationalisation of the LBE in 1938.

The entrance building was destroyed during an air raid on 24 April 1945.

Due to the progressive loss of traffic on branch lines from Bad Oldesloe from 1959, the north-western part of the station became superfluous. Today it consists only of a dead-end platform track with a bypass for trains to and from Hamburg. Its northern exit no longer exists. The existing signal boxes were replaced by a push-button signal box in 1973.

The current entrance building was built in 1998 to the north-west of the remaining tracks. Tracks 1 and 2 were built over. The former island station platform and central platform 6/7 are reached by an underpass, which is also accessible from the south-eastern side of the station, and the platforms are connected by stairs and lifts. The goods yard to the east of the Lübeck–Hamburg line has lost all of its tracks and the area has been remodelled, although some goods sheds still exist. The shunting and storage sidings to the south have been largely dismantled. Between the line to Ratzeburg (now the industrial connecting track to Besendorf) and the main line, there are still remnants of the locomotive depot as well as the locomotive shed, which is used for commercial purposes.

Since 2008 the Lübeck–Hamburg railway has been electrified, while the line branching to Neumünster is operated by Nordbahn with LINT 41 diesel multiple units. According to a 2010 survey, electrification of the line would have a benefit-cost ratio of only 0.6.

The platform canopy of tracks 6/7 has heritage protection.

== Services ==
Bad Oldesloe is served by Regional-Express services RE 8 and RE 80 on the Hamburg–Lübeck route, each hourly, together providing a service every half-hour, and Regionalbahn services RB 81 (Hamburg–Bad Oldesloe) and RB 82 (Neumünster–Bad Oldesloe), both running hourly.

Routes:

Line	Route	Frequency
RE 8	Hamburg Hbf – Bad Oldesloe – Lübeck – Travemünde	
RE 80	Hamburg Hbf – Ahrensburg – Bad Oldesloe – Lübeck	
RB 81	Hamburg Hbf – Ahrensburg – Bad Oldesloe	
