= Raaberbahn =

Hungarian and Austrian transport company

Raaberbahn; GYSEV
- Formerly: RoEE
- Type: Joint-stock company
- Industry: Passenger and cargo transportation
- Founded: 1872
- Founder: Ludwig Erlanger
- Headquarters: Sopron, Hungary
- Key people: János Perényi (president); István Szilárd Kövesdi (CEO); Csaba Ungvári (deputy president)
- Services: Transport and logistics
- Parent: Government of Hungary (72%); Government of Austria (28%)
- Subsidiaries: GYSEV Cargo
- Website: www2.gysev.hu; www.raaberbahn.at

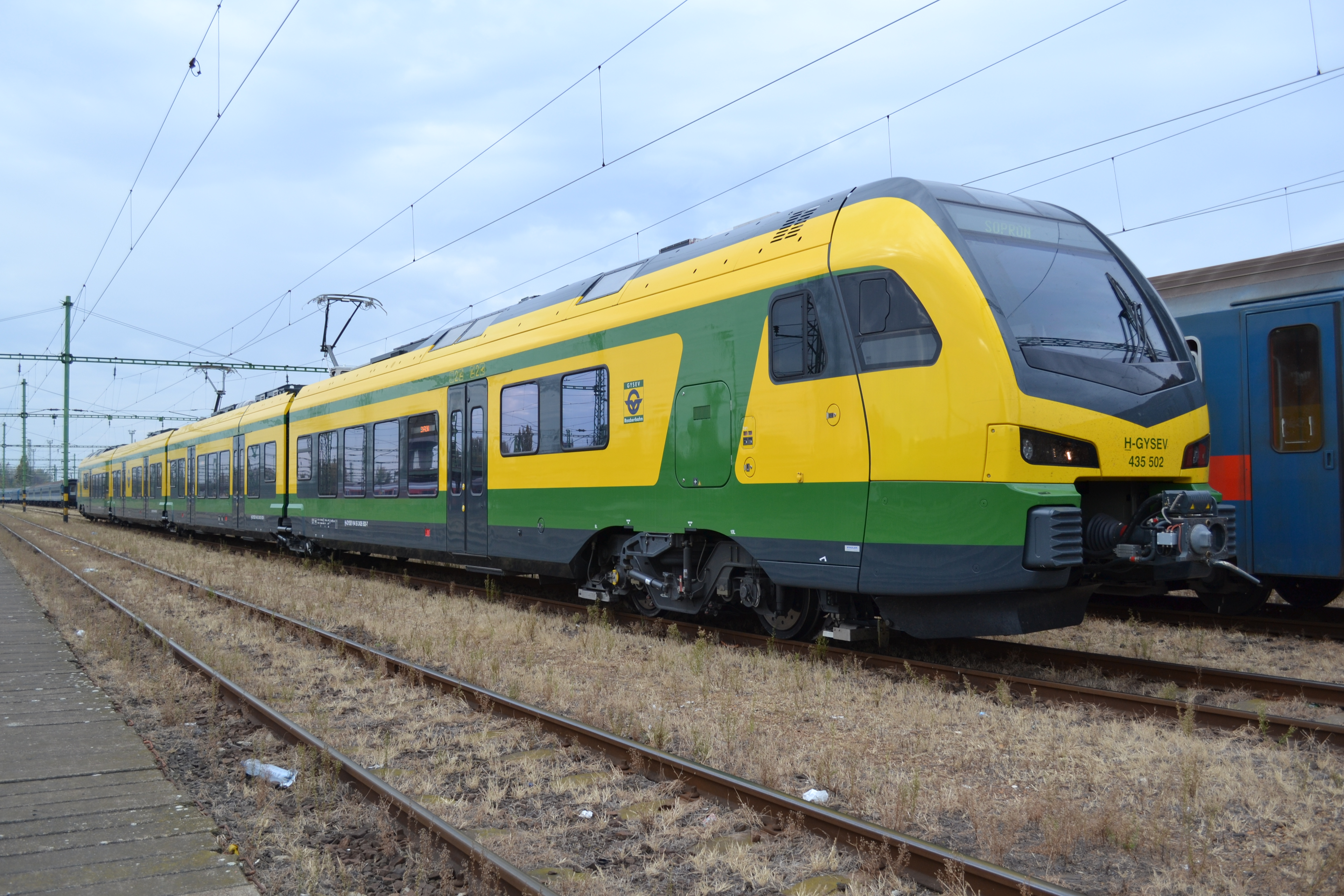
A GYSEV Stadler Flirt 3 in Szolnok, Hungary

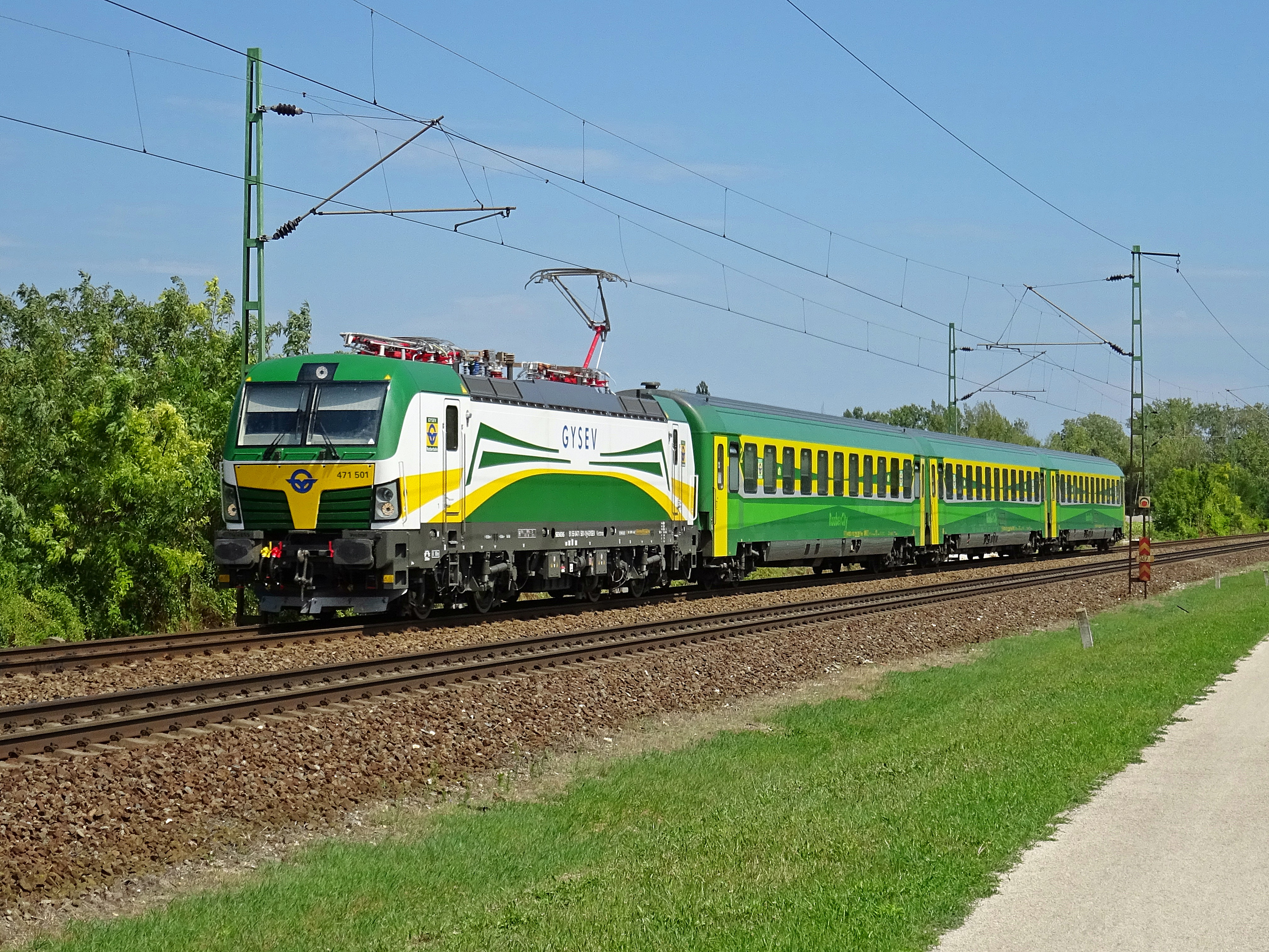
RaaberCity train at Szőny in Hungary

The Raaberbahn or GYSEV is a Hungarian-Austrian railway company based in Sopron, Hungary. The company is a joint enterprise of the states of Hungary (75%) and Austria (25%). In Hungarian it is called the Győr–Sopron–Ebenfurti Vasút (GYSEV), and in German it was known as the Raab-Oedenburg-Ebenfurther Eisenbahn (ROeEE) until 2008, when the name was changed to Raaberbahn.

== History ==
The company was established in 1872, at the instigation of Baron Viktor Erlanger. Following financial difficulties in the original Franco-Hungarian bank backers, control of the company had passed to Ludwig Erlanger and his Franco-Austrian bank by 1875.

The first line between the Hungarian cities Győr and Sopron was opened on 2 January 1876. The section between Sopron and Ebenfurth was opened for traffic on 28 October 1879. The adjoining Fertővidék Local Railway in Hungary started its operation on 19 December 1897.

The shareholding structure of the company did not change after the dissolution of the Austro-Hungarian Monarchy. The Hungarian State owns 72% and the Austrian State 28%. Until October 2024, Strabag owned 6%.

At the end of World War I, a special railway company was an independent railway, independent from MÁV, whose operation and independence in two countries was preserved by the Trianon Peace Treaty.

On 30 June 1942, the most serious accident in the history of GYSEV occurred on the Fertővidék Local Railway. The BCmot from Celldömölk to Sopron from a 16-lane motor car and two of its sidecars crashed into the open-air mixed train in front of the entrance marker at Vönöck station. The accident occurred due to the lack of braking of the train because the wagons were not connected to the main overhead line in Celldömölk. The tragedy had 80 injured and four dead.

On the morning of 15 November 1973, a serious accident also occurred, when the Cyclamen Express Train from Sopron via Győr to Budapest departed according to the schedule. At the same time, a freight train with a damaged break system was waiting at Fertőboz train station. The driver of the express train to Budapest was right to believe that the track was free due to a poorly managed, so-called spacing signal. Then, right before Fertőboz, he noticed the freight train on his track, however it was too late, and the collision could not be avoided. Twenty-three were injured in the accident, six of them severely.

On 26 May 1979, the Fertőszentmiklós-Celldömölk line was terminated on the Fertővidék Local Railway. Of the fifty kilometers of today's local railway, 13 kilometers are in Hungary and the rest in Austria.

The electrification of the Győr-Sopron railway was completed in 1987, and on 15 May 1987, seven locomotives V43 320-326 arrived in exchange for the prior M41 diesel locomotives.

Today, GYSEV operates six major railway lines in two countries and, with its European Economic Area license, carries rail passengers in both countries, as well as rail freight across Europe. An ancillary line of one of the former joining lines, the Fertővidék Local Railway (Fhév) was established in 1880 as a local railway according to the rules of the 1880s, but it is operated by GYSEV.

The extension of the railway lines began with the takeover of the Sopron-Szombathely railway line from MÁV in 2001. The electrification of the degraded track and the speeding up of investments started in 2002. The area of the railway company was further extended in December 2006 by the Szombathely-Szentgotthárd railway line, which was electrified from September 2009 until 2011.

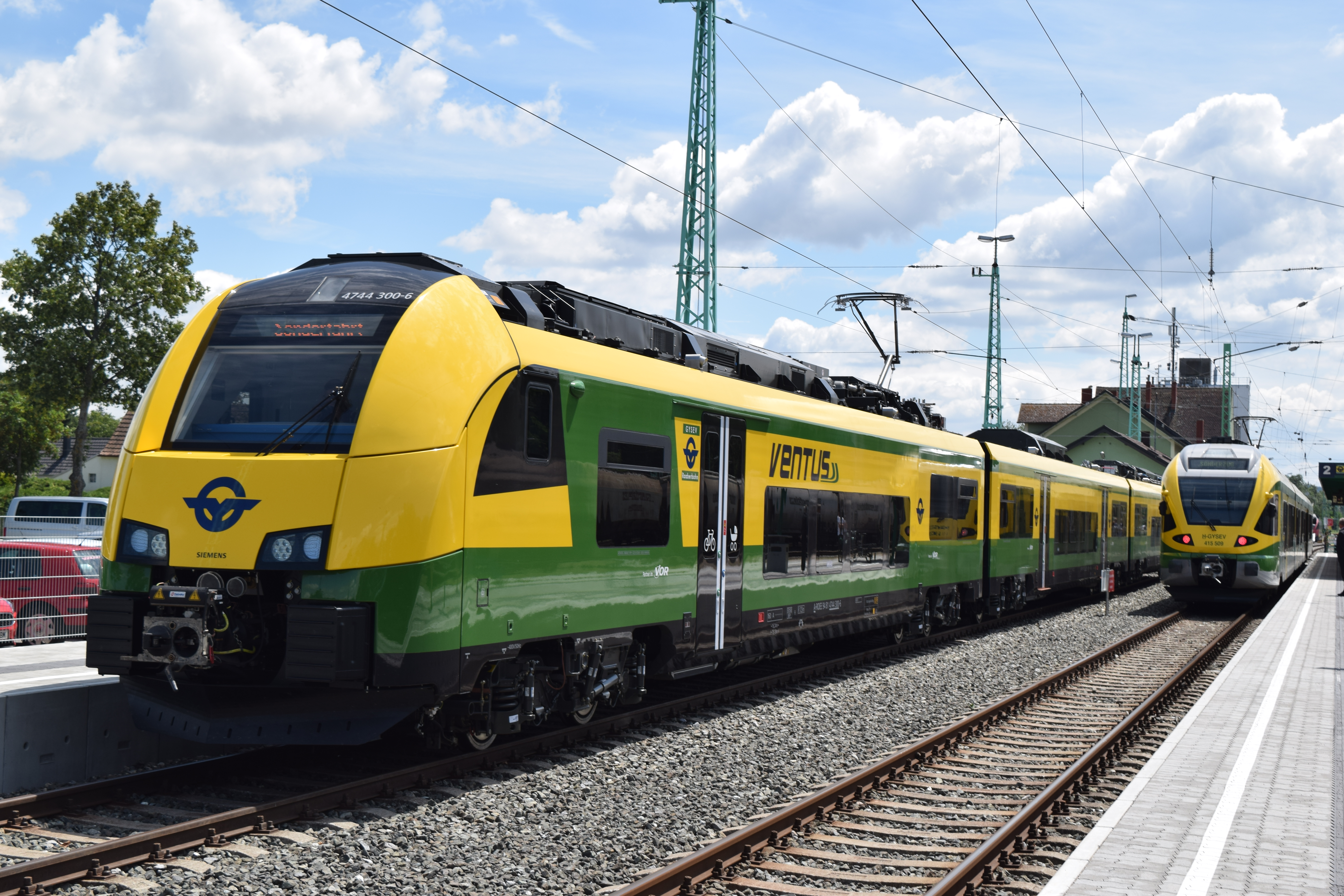
Siemens Desiro (GYSEV Ventus) and Stadler Flirts at Wulkaprodersdorf station in Austria

GYSEV took over the operation of the public passenger transport from 1 October 2011, and from 11 December 2011 to Rajka-Hegyeshalom-Csorna-Répcelak-Porpác, Porpác-Szombathely, Szombathely-Kőszeg, Szombathely-Zalaszentiván, as well as the currently defunct Körmend-Zalalövő railway line, thus extending its operating area by another 214 km railway line and Szombathely railway station. Due to the significant expansion of the network, Szombathely railway station became the largest railway station of GYSEV, ahead of Sopron station.

To operate these services, seven ÖBB Class 5047s were acquired.

On 6 December 2013, the Stadler Flirts on the Sopron-Szombathely-Szentgotthárd railway line were put into service and were operational from 15 December.

In 2014, the railway company contracted 5 Siemens Desiro ML motor trains worth €32 million, which from 4 September 2016 on the Vienna-Sopron-Sopronkeresztúr (Deutschkreutz), Vienna-Pomogy (Pamhagen) section and from December on the Wulkaprodersdorf -Nezsider (Neusiedl) were set into service.

In August 2016, it was announced that GYSEV will buy another 10 Flirt three-carriage trains for 21.5 billion HUF. The first vehicle has been delivered by the manufacturer in March 2018 and the tenth one by January 2019.

On 14 March 2017, it was announced that the company will purchase five dual-powered Vectron AC two-diesel engines and three three-power Vectron MS locomotives and four optional option locomotives for $12.5 billion. The first two vehicles were shipped by the manufacturer in May 2017, followed by the third one in July.

On the 10 of December 2017, rail passenger traffic at the border between Rajka in Hungary and Rusovce (Oroszvár) in Slovakia resumed. The trains are operated by GYSEV between Hegyeshalom - Rajka - Rusovce (Oroszvár)- Bratislava (Pozsony).

As of 2025, GYSEV also operates trains between Eisenstadt (Kismarton) - Vienna (Bécs) - Bratislava (Pozsony).

== Lines ==
Red: Lines of Raaberbahn (2011)

The company maintains the following railway lines:

- Line 1 Hegyeshalom–Rajka
- Line 8 Győr/Raab–Sopron/Ödenburg–Ebenfurth (Lower Austria), the main line of the company
- Line 9 Neusiedl am See (Burgenland)–Fertőszentmiklós (Hungary), German: "Neusiedler Seebahn"
- Line 15 Sopron/Ödenburg–Szombathely/Steinamanger (parallel to the Austrian border, in Hungary only; operated by MÁV, the Hungarian State Railway, until 2002)
- Line 16 Porpác–Csorna–Hegyeshalom
- Line 17 Szombathely–Zalaszentiván
- Line 21 Szombathely/Steinamanger–Szentgotthárd/St. Gotthard (as above; operated by MÁV until 2006)
- Line 22 Körmend–Zalalövő (closed, no traffic)
- Széchenyi Museum Railway near Nagycenk/Groß-Zinkendorf (Hungary), a narrow-gauge track constructed in 1972
