= St Michaelisdonn station =

Railway station in Dithmarschen, Schleswig-Holstein, Germany

St Michaelisdonn

General information
- Location: Bahnhofstraße 26; 25693 Sankt Michaelisdonn; Schleswig-Holstein; Germany
- Coordinates: 53.9897°N 9.1172°E
- Owner: Deutsche Bahn
- Operator: DB Station&Service
- Lines: Marsh Railway (KBS 130); St. Michaelisdonn–Friedrichskoog railway
- Platforms: 1 island platform
- Tracks: 3
- Train operators: DB Regio Nord
- Connections: RB 62; 2507 2510

Construction
- Parking: yes
- Cycle facilities: yes
- Accessible: no

Other information
- Station code: 5949
- DS100 code: ASD
- IBNR: 8005655
- Category: 5
- Fare zone: NAH.SH
- Website: www.bahnhof.de

Services
Preceding station	DB Regio Nord	Following station
Meldorf towards Heide (Holst)	RB 62	Burg (Dithm) towards Itzehoe
Location
- Location within Schleswig-Holstein Location within Germany Location within Europe

Sankt Michaelisdonn station (German: Bahnhof Sankt Michaelisdonn) is a railway station in the municipality of Sankt Michaelisdonn, located in the Dithmarschen district in Schleswig-Holstein, Germany.
