= Keitum station =

Railway station in Sylt municipality, Germany

Keitum Kairem
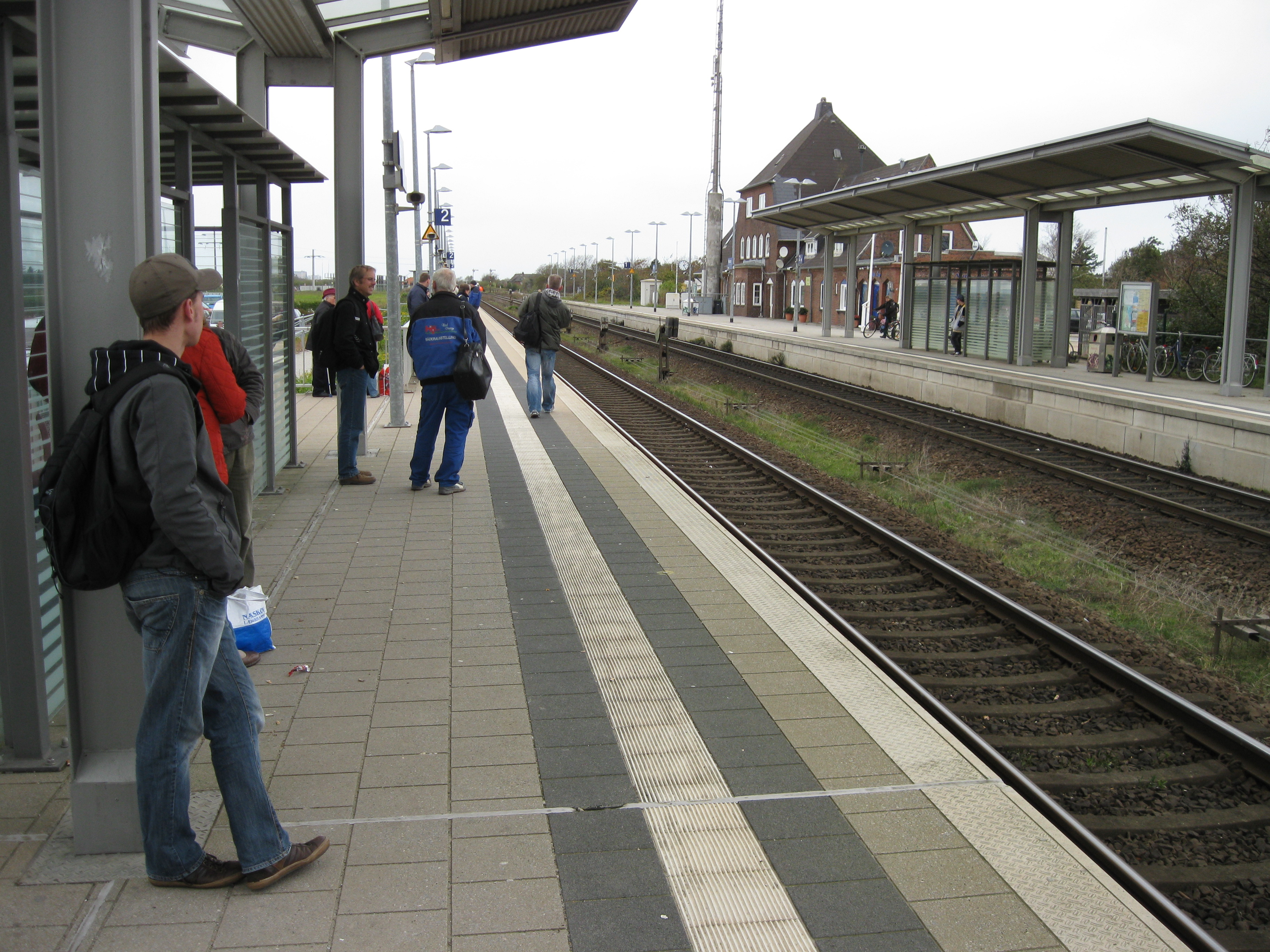
- 2010

General information
- Location: Bahnhofstraße 37; 25980 Keitum; Schleswig-Holstein; Germany
- Coordinates: 54.8890°N 8.3690°E
- Owner: Deutsche Bahn
- Operator: DB Station&Service
- Lines: Marsh Railway (KBS 130)
- Platforms: 2 side platforms
- Tracks: 2
- Train operators: DB Regio Nord
- Connections: 4

Construction
- Parking: yes
- Cycle facilities: yes
- Accessible: yes

Other information
- Station code: 3150
- DS100 code: AKI
- IBNR: 8003222
- Category: 4
- Fare zone: NAH.SH: 1060
- Website: www.bahnhof.de

Services
Preceding station	DB Regio Nord	Following station
Westerland (Sylt) Terminus	RE 6	Morsum towards Hamburg-Altona
Westerland (Sylt) Terminus	RE 60	Morsum towards Hamburg-Altona
Location

Keitum station (German: Bahnhof Keitum) is a railway station in the municipality of Keitum, located in the Nordfriesland district in Schleswig-Holstein, Germany.
