= Neumünster station =

Railway station in Germany

Neumünster
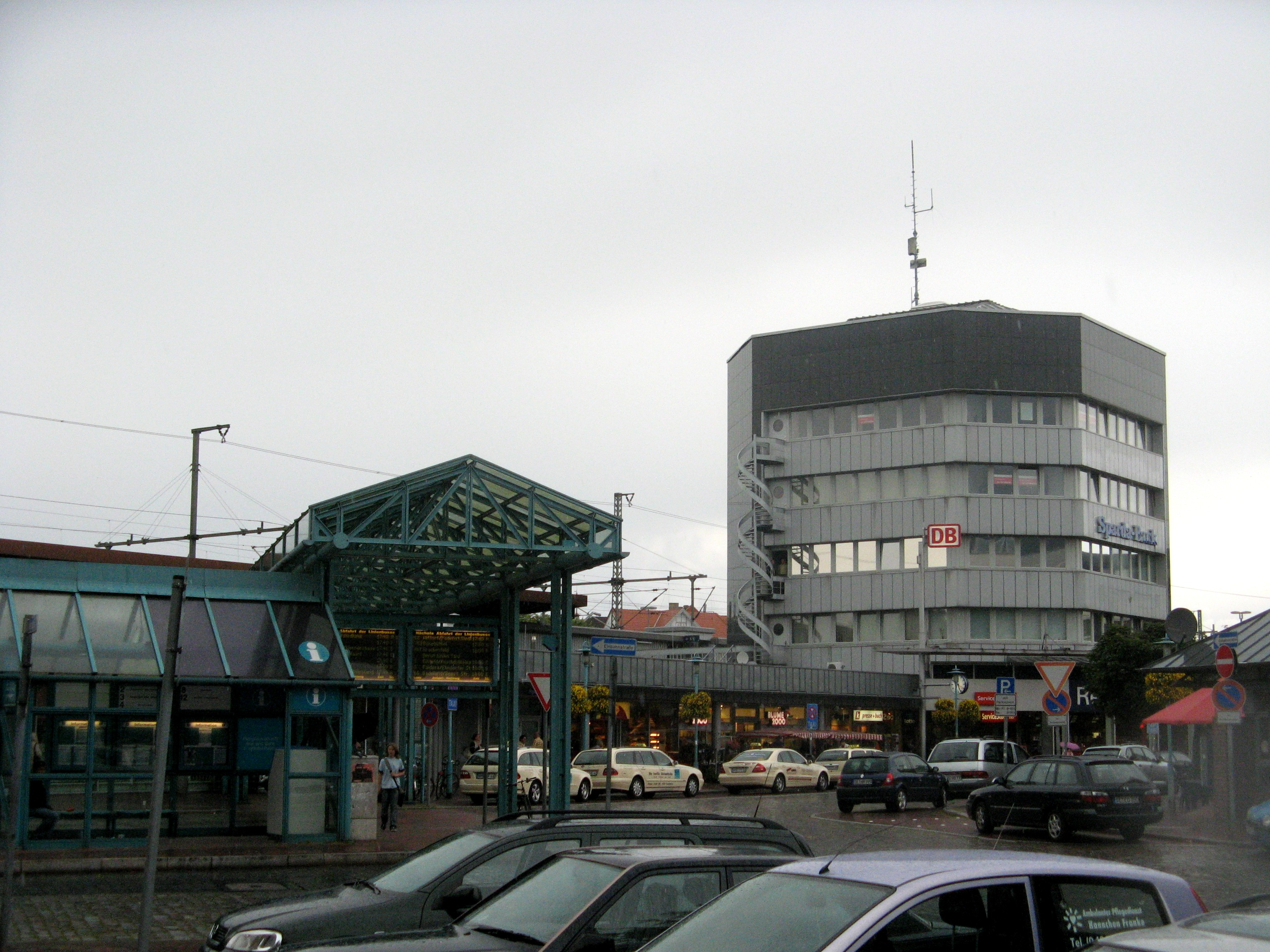

General information
- Location: Konrad-Adenauer-Platz 2, Neumünster, Schleswig-Holstein; Germany
- Coordinates: 54°04′33″N 9°58′48″E
- Lines: Neumünster–Flensburg; Neumünster–Heide; Hamburg-Altona–Neumünster–Kiel; Neumünster–Bad Oldesloe; Neumünster–Kaltenkirchen–Hamburg-Eidelstedt; Neumünster–Ascheberg (closed)
- Platforms: 6

Construction
- Accessible: Yes

Other information
- Station code: 4420
- DS100 code: AN
- IBNR: 8000271
- Category: 2
- Website: www.bahnhof.de

History
- Opened: 1844
Services
Preceding station	DB Fernverkehr	Following station
Kiel Hbf towards Hamburg Hbf or Kiel Hbf	ICE 22	Hamburg Dammtor towards Stuttgart Hbf
Kiel Hbf Terminus	RJ 27	Hamburg Hbf towards Praha hl.n.
Kiel Hbf Terminus	ICE 28	Hamburg Dammtor towards München Hbf
Preceding station	DB Regio Nord	Following station
Einfeld towards Kiel Hbf	RE 7	Elmshorn towards Hamburg Hbf
Nortorf towards Flensburg	RE 7	Elmshorn towards Hamburg Hbf
Bordesholm towards Kiel Hbf	RE 70	Brokstedt towards Hamburg Hbf
Preceding station		Following station
Neumünster Stadtwald towards Büsum	RB 63	Terminus
Terminus	RB 82	Neumünster Süd towards Bad Oldesloe
Preceding station		Following station
Terminus	A2	Neumünster Süd towards Norderstedt Mitte
Location

Neumünster station is the main railway station of the town of Neumünster in the German state of Schleswig-Holstein. It is at the junction of lines to Flensburg, Heide, Hamburg-Altona, Kiel, Bad Oldesloe, Kaltenkirchen and until 1985 Ascheberg. It is currently operated by Deutsche Bahn, which classifies it as a category 2 station.

== History ==
The station was opened in 1844 by the Altona-Kiel Railway Company (German: Altona-Kieler Eisenbahn-Gesellschaft, AKE) during the construction of the first railway line in Schleswig-Holstein, which connected Kiel with Altona. Soon, more lines were added: in 1845 the route to Rendsburg was opened by the Rendsburg-Neumünster Railway Company (Rendsburg-Neumünstersche Eisenbahn). In 1866 the AKE opened its line to Ascheberg and on to Neustadt in Holstein (part of which is now incorporated in the Kiel–Lübeck line) and in 1875 it opened its line to Bad Oldesloe. Finally in 1877 the line to and from Heide was opened by the West Holstein Railway Company (Westholsteinische Eisenbahn-Gesellschaft). The AKN Railway reached Neumünster in 1916, but at first its trains terminated in Neumünster-Süd station.

The original station building was demolished in 1974 and replaced by a modern building.

In September 1985 the line from Neumünster to Ascheberg was closed to passenger traffic. In November 1995, freight traffic on the line was also officially closed.

Since 2009, some modernisation has been carried out at the station. Thus, the passenger information systems have been replaced. Facilities on the platforms have been modernised and lifts to the platforms have been replaced.

More recent modernisation includes provision of automatic ticket machines. However if you need help with your ticket purchase and/or need to use the DB ticket office, it is not situated in the Station building but in Rendsburger Strasse over the road from the station. A sign by DB to explain this to passengers is needed.

== Operations ==
In the 2026 timetable, the following long-distance services stop at the station:

Line	Route	Frequency
ICE 22	Kiel – Neumünster – Hamburg – Hanover – Kassel-Wilhelmshöhe – Frankfurt – Frankfurt Airport – Mannheim – Stuttgart	5 train pairs
RJ 27	Kiel – Neumünster – Hamburg – Berlin – Dresden – Prague	1 train pair
ICE 28	Kiel – Neumünster – Hamburg – Berlin – Leipzig – Nürnberg – Munich	1 train pair

=== Regional Transport ===
In the 2026 timetable, the following regional services serve the station:

Line	Route		Frequency	Stock
RE 7	Flensburg – Schleswig – Rendsburg –	Neumünster – Elmshorn – Hamburg Hbf	Hourly	445 (Twindexx)
RE 7	Kiel Hbf – Flintbek – Bordesholm – Einfeld –	Neumünster – Elmshorn – Hamburg Hbf	Hourly	445 (Twindexx)
RE 70	Kiel Hbf – Bordesholm – Neumünster – Brokstedt – Wrist – Elmshorn – Hamburg Hbf		Hourly	445 (Twindexx)
RB 63	(Büsum – Heide –) Hohenwestedt – Neumünster		Hourly	648 (LINT 41)
RB 82	Neumünster – Bad Segeberg – Bad Oldesloe		Hourly	648 (LINT 41)
A2	Neumünster – Kaltenkirchen – Henstedt-Ulzburg – Norderstedt Mitte		Hourly	622 (LINT 54)

(as of 2023)

=== Tracks ===
The station has six tracks that are used in passenger transport. Normally they are used as follows:

- Platform track 1: trains to and from Bad Oldesloe.
- Platform track 2: trains to and from Kaltenkirchen–Hamburg-Eidelstedt.
- Platform tracks 3, 4 and 5: trains to and from Hamburg, Kiel and Flensburg.
- Platform track 6: trains operate to and from Heide–Büsum.
