= Wrist station =

Railway station in Wrist, Germany

Wrist
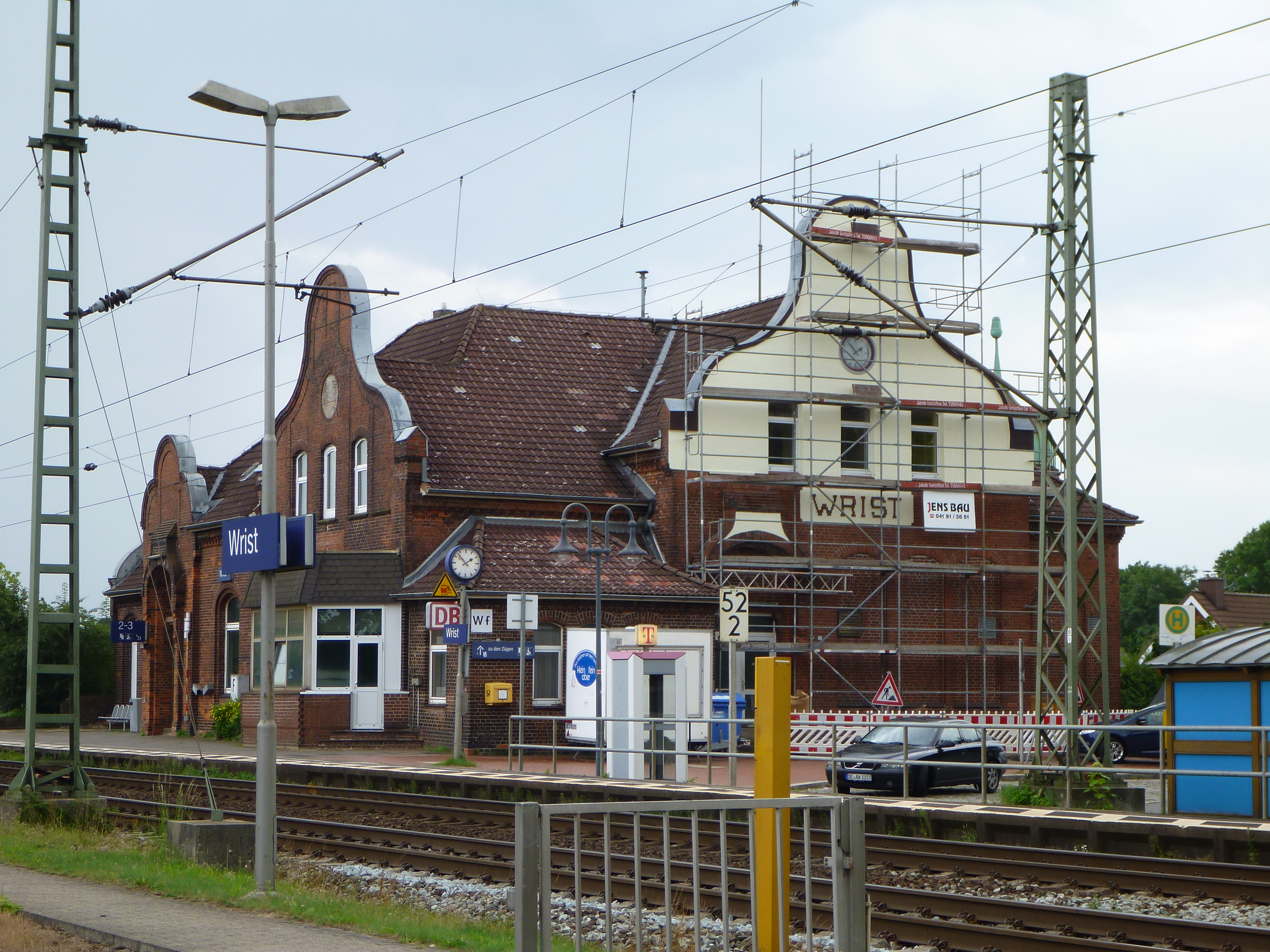
- Wrist station from the south

General information
- Location: Hauptstraße 1, Wrist, Schleswig-Holstein; Germany
- Coordinates: 53°55′59″N 9°44′57″E
- Lines: Hamburg–Kiel (km 52.2) (KBS 103); Wrist–Itzehoe (km 0.0) (closed)
- Platforms: 3

Construction
- Accessible: Yes

Other information
- Station code: 6897
- DS100 code: AWST
- IBNR: 510843
- Category: 4
- Website: www.bahnhof.de

History
- Opened: 18 September 1844; 181 years ago
- Electrified: 24 September 1995; 30 years ago

Passengers
- 477,000

Services
Preceding station	DB Regio Nord	Following station
Brokstedt towards Kiel Hbf	RE 70	Elmshorn towards Hamburg Hbf
Preceding station		Following station
Terminus	RB 71	Dauenhof towards Hamburg-Altona
Location
- Location within Schleswig-Holstein Location within Germany Location within Europe

Wrist station is a passenger station in the centre of Wrist (in the district of Steinburg) in the German state of Schleswig-Holstein. It is on the Hamburg-Altona–Kiel railway and the now disused Itzehoe-Wrist railway. The station is mainly used by commuters. Nearly 500,000 passengers use Wrist station each year. To the south of the station there are numerous parking spaces in the station forecourt, which is also served by some bus routes.

The station was built by the Altona-Kiel Railway Company (Altona-Kieler Eisenbahn-Gesellschaft, AKE) in 1844. It was opened with the railway line on 18 September 1844. The station was connected to the now disused Itzehoe-Wrist railway in 1889. The entrance hall of the station was rebuilt between 1880 and 1895. The railway settlement of Wrist then developed around the station over the years. The railway had a major economic impact on the community, which among other things, led Wrist to merge with the older neighbouring community of Stellau under the same name of Wrist.

Three tracks run through the station next to two platforms. One platform is located next to the entrance building and the other two next to an island platform between the tracks.

The station building is for sale because it is no longer needed for operations.

== Rail services ==
In the 2026 timetable, the following services stopped at the station:

Train class	Route	Frequency
RE 70	Hamburg-Altona – Pinneberg – Elmshorn – Wrist – Neumünster – Kiel	Hourly
RB 71	Hamburg-Altona – Pinneberg – Tornesch – Elmshorn – Dauenhof – Wrist	Hourly
