= Tönning station =

Railway station in Tönning, Germany

Tönning
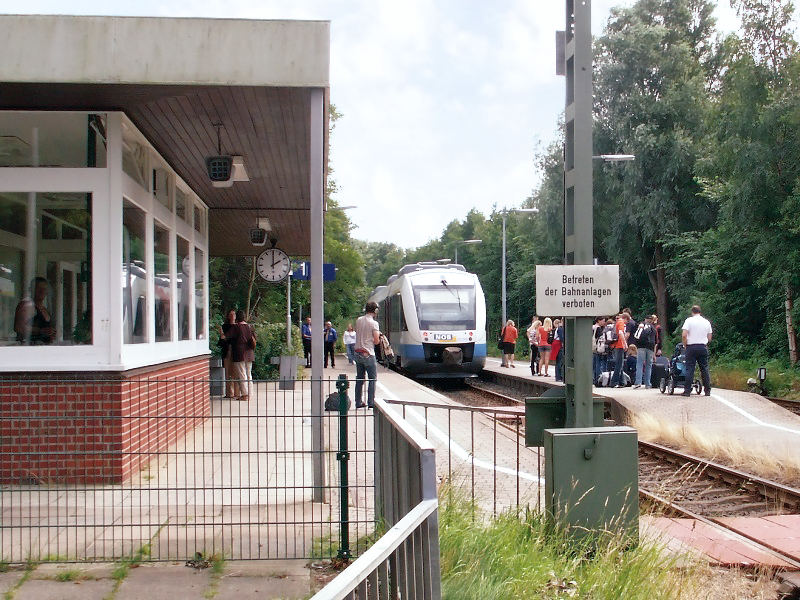
- 2007

General information
- Location: Am Bahnhof 2; 25832 Tönning; Schleswig-Holstein; Germany
- Coordinates: 54.3142°N 8.9377°E
- System: Bf
- Owner: Deutsche Bahn
- Operator: DB Netz; DB Station&Service
- Lines: Husum–Bad St. Peter-Ording railway (KBS 135)
- Platforms: 1 side platform, 1 island platform
- Tracks: 2
- Train operators: nordbahn
- Connections: RB 64; 1071 1075 1076 1077 2614

Construction
- Parking: yes
- Cycle facilities: yes
- Accessible: yes

Other information
- Station code: 6225
- DS100 code: ATG
- IBNR: 8005885
- Category: 6
- Fare zone: NAH.SH
- Website: www.bahnhof.de

Services
Preceding station		Following station
Kating towards Bad St. Peter-Ording	RB 64 reverses out	Harblek towards Husum
Location
- Location within Schleswig-Holstein Location within Germany Location within Europe

Tönning station (German: Bahnhof Tönning) is a railway station in the municipality of Tönning, located in the Nordfriesland district in Schleswig-Holstein, Germany.
