= Wrist, Germany =

Wrist
- Municipality
- Coat of arms

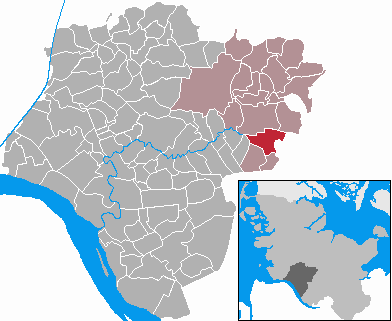
- Location of Wrist within Steinburg district
- Interactive map of Wrist
- Location within Germany Location within Schleswig-Holstein
- Coordinates: 53°55′59″N 9°44′57″E
- Country: Germany
- State: Schleswig-Holstein
- District: Steinburg
- Municipal assoc.: Kellinghusen

Government
  - Mayor: Jörg Frers

Area
  - Total: 10.12 km^{2} (3.91 sq mi)
- Elevation: 2 m (6.6 ft)

Population (2025-12-31)
  - Total: 2,340
  - Density: 231/km^{2} (599/sq mi)
- Time zone: UTC+01:00 (CET)
  - Summer (DST): UTC+02:00 (CEST)
- Postal codes: 25563
- Dialling codes: 04822
- Vehicle registration: IZ
- Website: www.wrist.de

Wrist (German pronunciation: [vʁɪst]) is a municipality in the district of Steinburg, in Schleswig-Holstein, Germany.

== Geography ==
Wrist is situated 2 kilometres southeast of Kellinghusen and Wrist station is on the main railway line from Hamburg to Kiel. The Bundesstraße 206 passes Wrist. It is connected with the Bundesautobahn 7 in the east. The nearest airport is Hamburg Airport.
