= Pinneberg station =

Railway station in Pinneberg, Germany

Coordinates: 53°39′16″N 9°47′56″E

Pinneberg
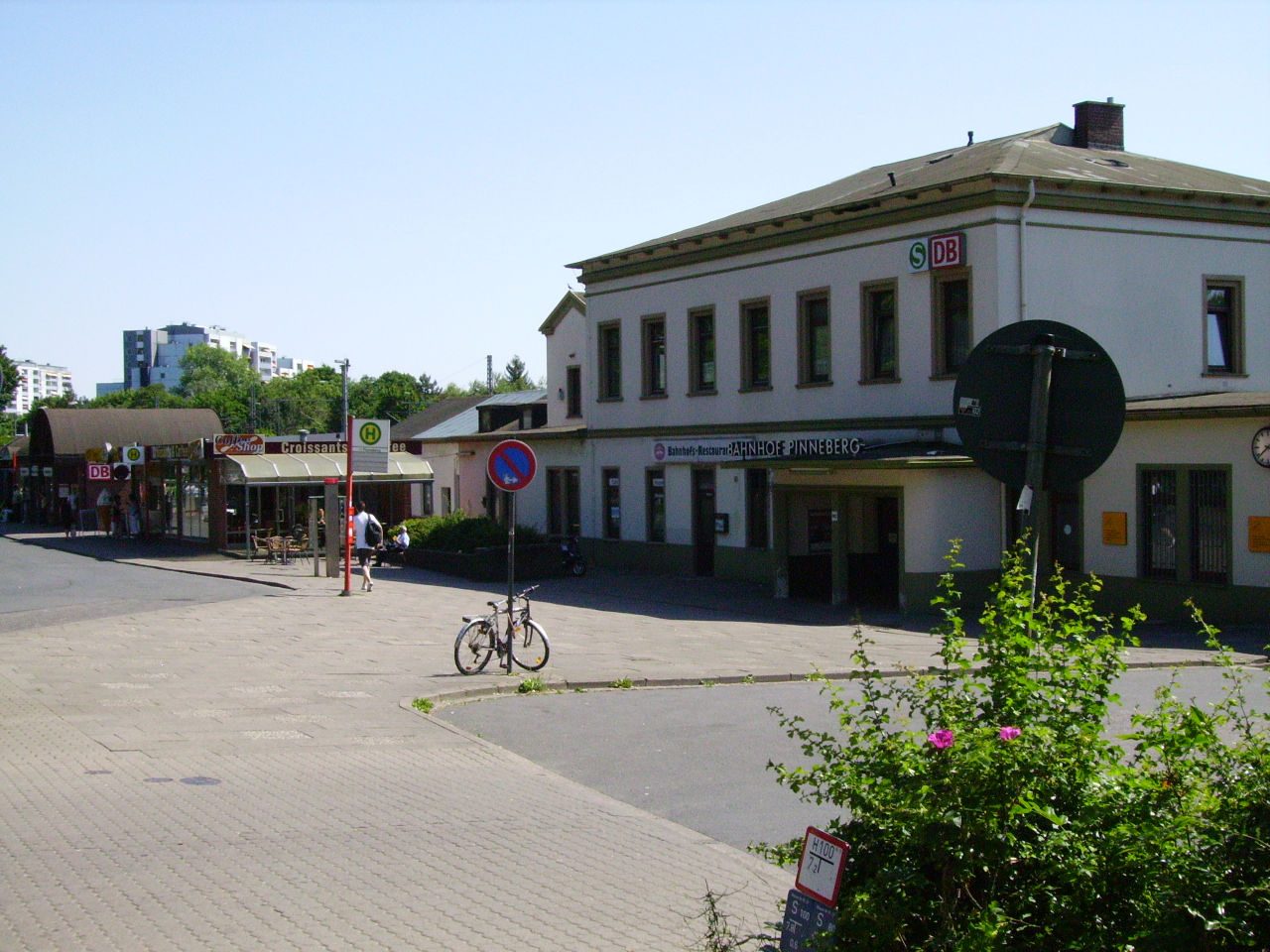
- Main entrance

General information
- Location: Bahnhofstr. 1; 25421 Pinneberg; Pinneberg, Schleswig-Holstein; Germany
- Owner: DB Netz
- Operator: DB Station&Service
- Line: Hamburg-Altona–Kiel railway
- Train operators: DB Regio Nord; S-Bahn Hamburg
- Connections: S3

Other information
- Station code: 4935
- DS100 code: AP
- IBNR: 8004819
- Category: 3
- Fare zone: HVV: B/402 and 502
- Website: www.bahnhof.de

History
- Opened: 18 September 1844; 181 years ago
- Electrified: 22 September 1967; 58 years ago (3rd rail) main line 24 September 1995; 30 years ago (overhead)

Services
Preceding station	DB Regio Nord	Following station
Elmshorn towards Flensburg or Kiel Hbf	RE 7	Hamburg Dammtor towards Hamburg Hbf
Preceding station		Following station
Prisdorf towards Itzehoe	RB 61	Hamburg Dammtor towards Hamburg Hbf
Prisdorf towards Itzehoe or Wrist	RB 71	Hamburg-Altona Terminus
Preceding station	Hamburg S-Bahn	Following station
Terminus	S3	Thesdorf towards Hamburg-Neugraben
Location
- Location within Hamburg Location within Schleswig-Holstein Location within Germany Location within Europe

Pinneberg station is a railway station on the Hamburg-Altona–Kiel line and located in Pinneberg, Germany, and served by the city trains and regional trains. It is a terminus for the rapid transit trains of the line S3 of the Hamburg S-Bahn.

== Station layout ==
The station is at-grade and has two exits, the main exit with a bus stop and a taxicab stand. The second exit is to the park and ride facility, this exit is through a pedestrian underpass and has no lift. The railway station has a long island platform with the tracks 4 and 5 for the regional trains. Track 1 and track 2 have side platforms for the suburban or city trains. The platform between 2 and 3 is used as an interchange of the S-Bahn and the regional rail towards Neumünster.

== Station services ==
=== Regional trains ===
The regional lines RE 7, RB 61 and RB 71 from Hamburg central station and Hamburg-Altona railway station respectively toward Wrist, Kiel or Flensburg and Itzehoe call the station frequently. Trains at track 5 are toward Hamburg, at track 4 toward Itzehoe. Track three is used by trains in the direction Neumünster and Kiel.

=== Hamburg S-Bahn ===
The tracks 1 and 2 are used by the S3 line of the Hamburg S-Bahn as a terminus. Toward Stade the trains need 96 minutes, reaching Hamburg central station in 39 minutes.

=== Buses ===
Several bus lines connect the nearby municipalities with the railway.

=== Facilities at the station ===
The station is managed by the DB Station&Service plc. There are ticket machines for the transport association of Hamburg and the German railway company. The station building is open only on weekdays. About 390 park and ride places and 490 bicycle stands can be used. A small shop for newspapers and fast food snack stands are located at the station. Like many other stations the station is controlled with a video surveillance system.
