= Hoppenwalde station =

Railway station in Germany

Hoppenwalde

General information
- Location: Hoppenwalde, MV, Germany
- Coordinates: 53°42′23″N 14°04′33″E
- Line: Jatznick–Ueckermünde railway line
- Platforms: 1
- Tracks: 1

History
- Opened: 15 September 1884; 141 years ago
- Closed: 2011
Location
- Location within Mecklenburg-Vorpommern Location within Germany Location within Europe

Hoppenwalde (German: Bahnhof Hoppenwalde) is a disused railway station in the village of Hoppenwalde, Mecklenburg-Vorpommern, Germany. The station lies on the Jatznick–Ueckermünde railway line. The station was closed at the end of 2011.
