= Thesdorf station =

Railway station in Pinneberg, Germany

Coordinates: 53°38′38″N 9°48′52″E

Thesdorf
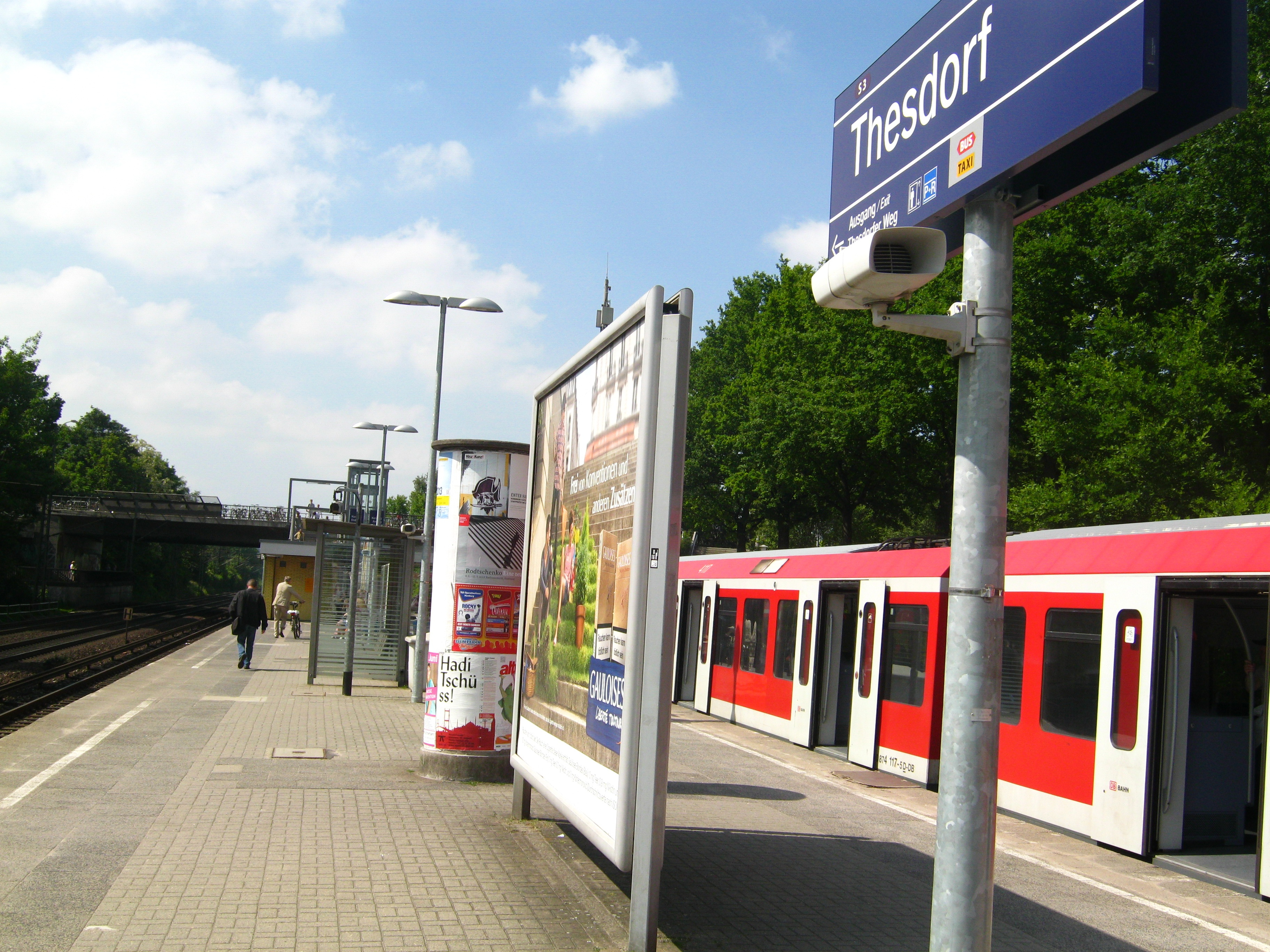
- Platform at Thesdorf station in 2013

General information
- Location: Thesdorfer Weg; 25421 Pinneberg; Germany
- Line: Hamburg S-Bahn S3
- Platforms: 1
- Tracks: 2
- Connections: Bus

Construction
- Structure type: At grade
- Parking: Park and ride
- Cycle facilities: 40 bicycle stands

Other information
- Station code: ds100: ATHS; DB station code: 6197; Type: Hp; Category: 5
- Fare zone: HVV: B/402

History
- Opened: 23 September 1967; 58 years ago
- Electrified: 1200 volts DC system third rail

Services
Preceding station	Hamburg S-Bahn	Following station
Pinneberg Terminus	S3	Halstenbek towards Hamburg-Neugraben
Location

Thesdorf station is on the Hamburg-Altona–Kiel line and is a railway station served by the city trains of the Hamburg S-Bahn. The railway station is located in the town Pinneberg in the district of the same name, in Schleswig-Holstein, Germany.

== Station layout ==
The station is an at-grade island platform with 2 tracks and an exit through a pedestrian underpass. The station is accessible for handicapped persons with a lift.

== Station services ==
=== Trains ===
The rapid transit trains of the line S3 of the Hamburg S-Bahn are calling the station. Direction of the trains on track 1 is Pinneberg. On track 2 the trains are traveling in the direction Stade via Hamburg central station.

=== Buses ===
A bus line is calling a bus stop in front.

=== Facilities at the station ===
The station is unstaffed but there are SOS and information telephones, ticket machines, 40 bicycle stands and 360 park and ride parking spaces.

== See also ==
- Hamburger Verkehrsverbund HVV
