= Büsum station =

Railway station in Büsum, Germany

Büsum
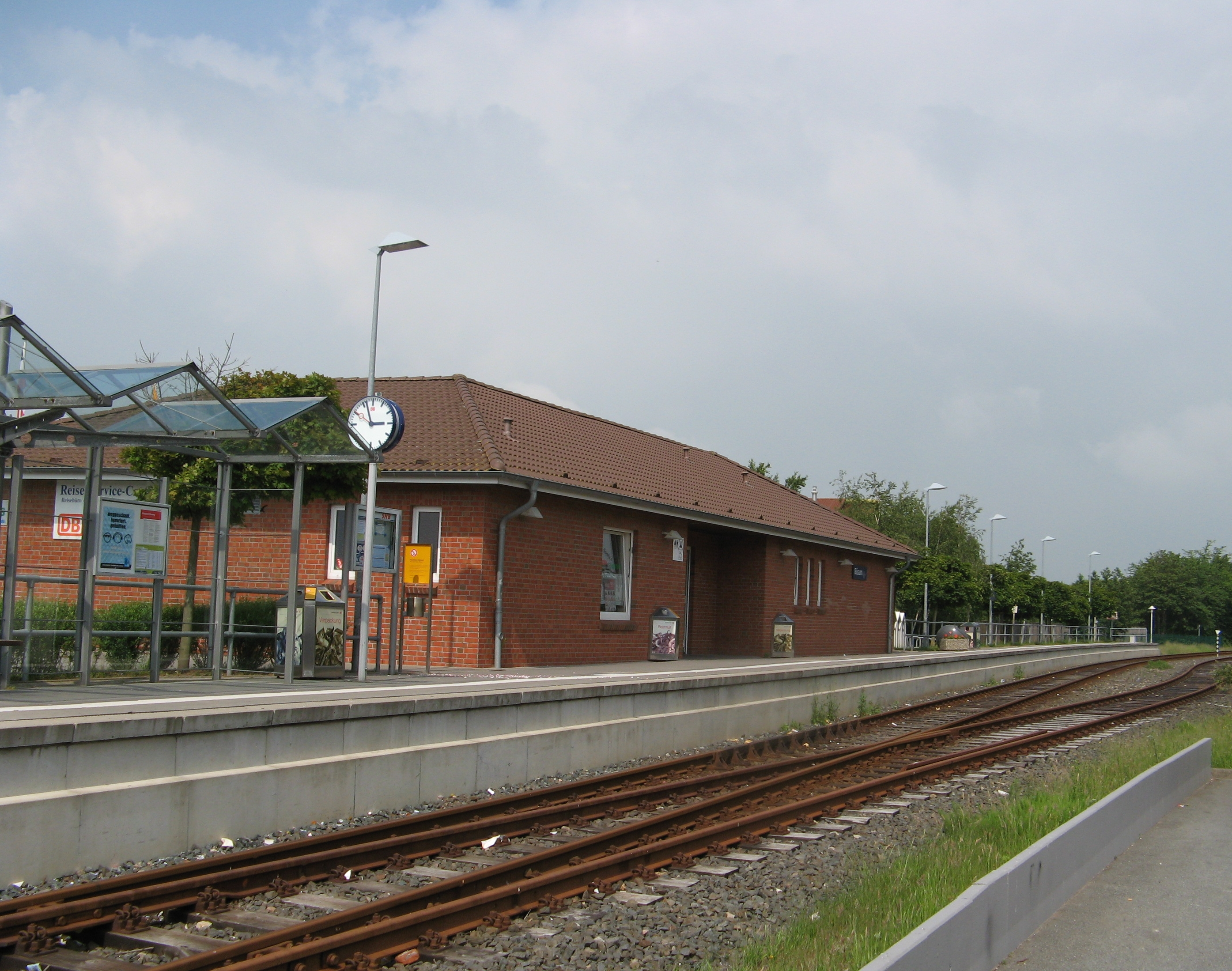
- 2007

General information
- Location: Heider Straße 20; 25761 Büsum; Schleswig-Holstein; Germany
- Coordinates: 54.1339°N 8.8671°E
- System: Bf
- Owner: Deutsche Bahn
- Operator: DB Station&Service
- Lines: Heide–Büsum railway (KBS 133)
- Platforms: 1 side platform
- Tracks: 2
- Train operators: nordbahn
- Connections: RB 63; 2610 2612

Construction
- Parking: yes
- Cycle facilities: yes
- Accessible: yes

Other information
- Station code: 1008
- DS100 code: ABSM
- IBNR: 8001259
- Category: 6
- Fare zone: NAH.SH
- Website: www.bahnhof.de

Services
Preceding station		Following station
Terminus	RB 63	Reinsbüttel towards Neumünster
Location
- Location within Schleswig-Holstein Location within Germany Location within Europe

Büsum station (German: Bahnhof Büsum) is a railway station in the municipality of Büsum, located in the Dithmarschen district in Schleswig-Holstein, Germany.
