= ÖBB Class 5047 =

ÖBB 5047
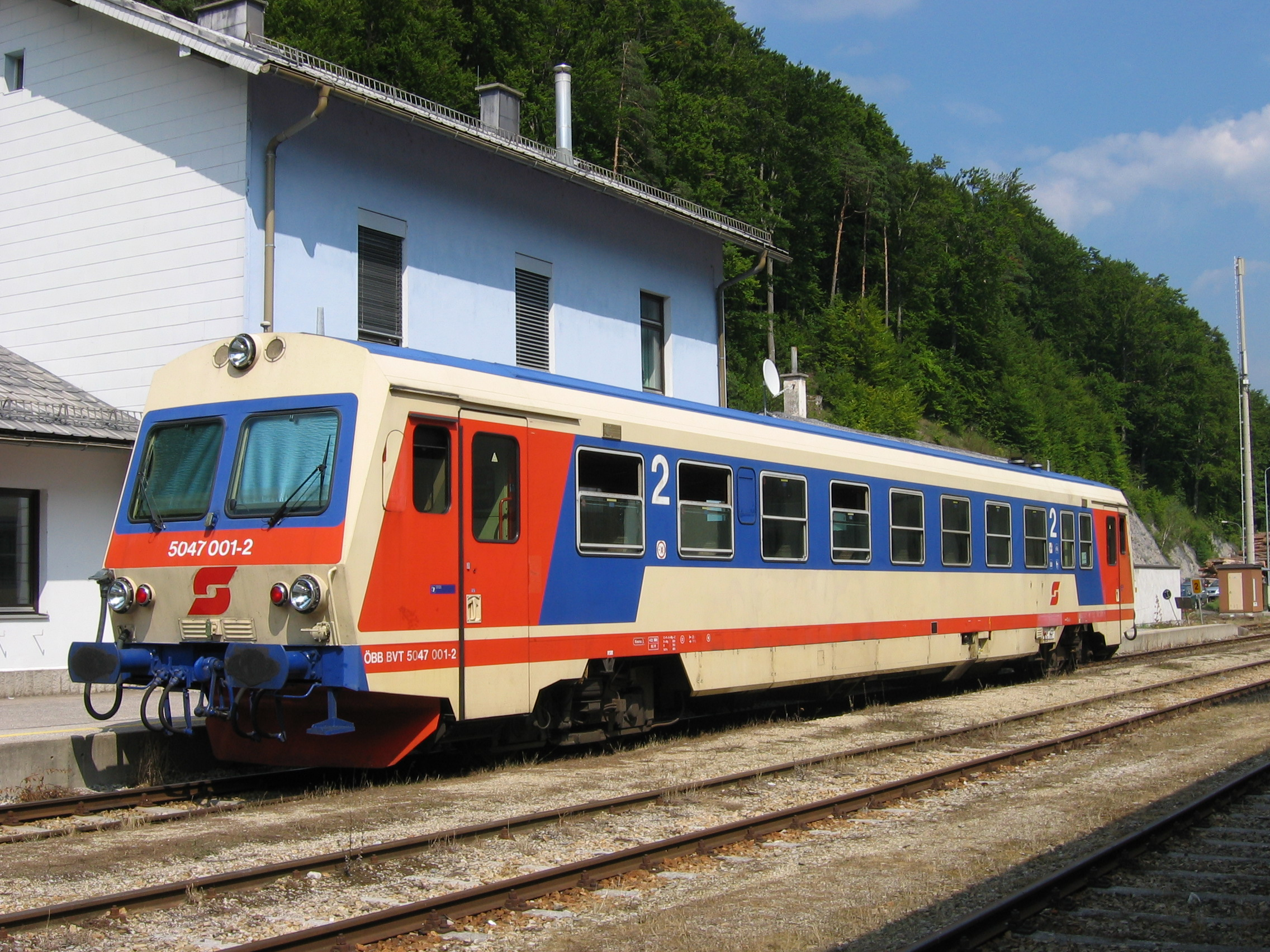
- A class 5047 DMU
- Stock type: Diesel railcar
- Manufacturer: Jenbacher Werke
- Constructed: 1987–1995
- Number built: 100
- Fleet numbers: 5047 001–100
- Capacity: 62
- Operators: Austrian Federal Railways; Raaberbahn; Steiermärkische Landesbahnen

Specifications
- Maximum speed: 120 km/h (75 mph)
- Power supply: Diesel
- Safety systems: Indusi, PZB

The ÖBB Class 5047 are diesel railcars used in regional transportation. The trains were built by Jenbacher Werke and entered service in 1987. The GySEV and the Steiermarkbahn also have railcars of this type.

== History ==
In 1983, ÖBB placed an order with Jenbacher Werke for six new diesel railcars based on the German 627 series. The first vehicle was completed in July 1987 and presented at an international press trip to Rosenburg am Kamp. After successful operation on the lines of the “Schweinbarther Kreuz” in the Weinviertel region of Lower Austria, where the six 5047s were used in a quickly conceived “special plan”, a total of 100 railcars with modified Marschwandlers of the 5047 series and five sets (10 individual vehicles) of the 5147 series were built for the ÖBB. A single Class 5047 unit cost ATS 27 million at the time, a driving trailer would hardly have been cheaper at ATS 22 million. Therefore, the solution for the 5147 was a double railcar in the form of two short-coupled vehicles; control cars for 5047 were not procured, but there were deployments with 7147 bicycle cars converted from 7081 rail bus side cars.

These two vehicle types replaced the old 5044, 5144, 5145, 5146 and 5081 series, some of which dated back to the interwar period, were technically obsolete and had reached the end of their economic service life. In contrast to locomotive-hauled trains, the railcars can be operated in one-man operation without a train attendant (ÖBB designation “0:0”), thus reducing personnel costs, as the driver can also sell tickets. Later, all vehicles were equipped with ticket vending machines, which today makes ticket sales by the driver obsolete. With the use of these vehicles, ÖBB was able to achieve an improvement in economic results on numerous branch lines.

The design and color scheme of the series was developed by Wolfgang Valousek. The railcars 5047 001 to 032 were painted in ivory, ultramarine blue and blood orange ex works, 033 to 100 in agate gray, ultramarine blue and traffic red.

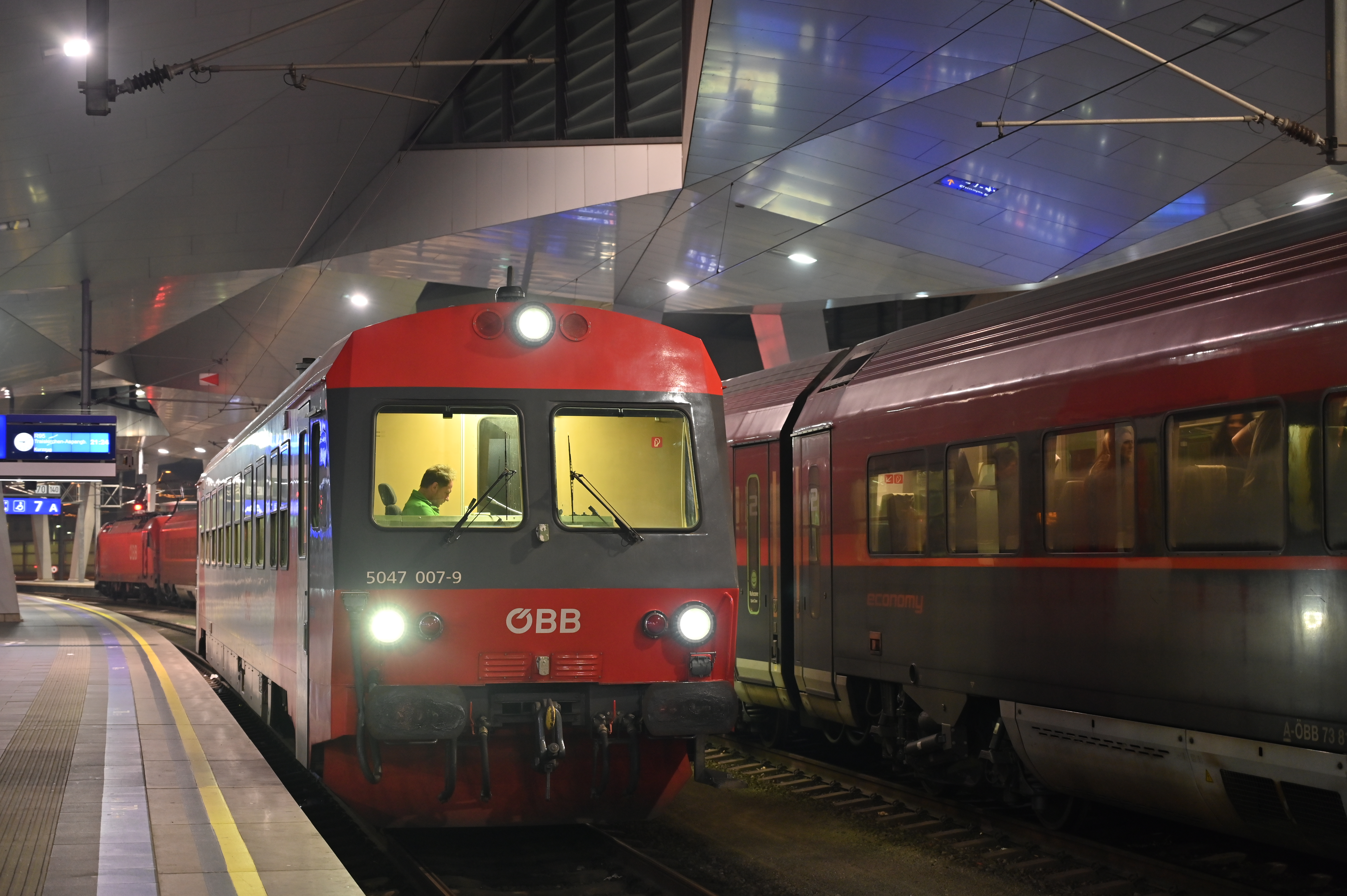
ÖBB Class 5047 in Wien Hbf.

In the 1990s, there were a number of head-on collisions on secondary lines, particularly in Lower Austria and Burgenland, in which some of the 5047 series railcars were involved. These included two accidents on the Schneeberg Railway within one and a half months. All the vehicles involved in the accidents were repaired at the time. The vehicles involved were 5047 004; 060; 047; 001; 021 and 094. For more details, see List of railroad accidents in Austria Section: 1990–1999

The vehicles 003–009, 011, 012, 014, 018 and 019 were modernized from 2004: they were repainted in the current ÖBB colors for local transport (diagonal design in red/grey, parts of the front in dark grey), the seats in the interior were also reupholstered (in blue) and the partition walls were removed. 5047 026; 061; 090; 094; 097 and 099 also received this paint design, but retained the original interior fittings.

The success of the railcars prompted the two Austrian private railroads Steiermärkische Landesbahnen (now Steiermarkbahn und Bus GmbH) and Raab-Ödenburg-Ebenfurter Eisenbahn (now GYSEV Raaberbahn AG) to also purchase two vehicles of this series each, which were accepted in accordance with ÖBB regulations. These railcars are also used on ÖBB routes to “compensate for kilometers” for the use of ÖBB vehicles on private railroads. In contrast to the ÖBB railcars, the private railway vehicles have roller conveyor displays on the fronts.

NVAG (now Norddeutsche Eisenbahngesellschaft Niebüll) also procured a railcar, which is in service on the Niebüll - Dagebüll line. This has a different interior with first and second class.

=== Whereabouts ===
After 2005, the 5047 was replaced by the 5022 series on some routes.

Seven (5047 008, 020, 031, 044, 062, 068 and 100) were sold to Raaberbahn in 2011 and renumbered 247 503–509.

With 5047 074, which had an accident with a truck on the Almtalbahn in summer 2016, the first 5047 was dismantled between October 8 and 11, 2017. The 5047 017, which collided with an unrolled freight train on the Erlauftalbahn in October 2016 and was severely damaged, was the second vehicle in the series to be dismantled. In April 2019, 5047 095 collided with a truck on the Marchegger Ostbahn and soon afterwards, on 30 September 2019, 5047 057 collided with an articulated truck in Gänserndorf and subsequently burned out. 5047 070, which rammed a rock on the Mühlkreisbahn at the beginning of April 2022, was the fifth 5047 to be taken out of service due to an accident. 5047 030 suffered major fire damage in January 2023 and was also taken out of service as a result.

Due to the start of electric operation on the Marchegger Ostbahn and the Rosentalbahn between Klagenfurt and Weizelsdorf and the resulting surplus of diesel railcars, vehicles 5047 015, 026 and 049 were taken out of service at the turn of the year 2022/23. This was followed by 5047 055 in summer 2023.

== Construction and engineering ==
In contrast to all the railcars it replaced, with the exception of the 5081, the entire drive system of the 5047 is located underfloor.

The 5047 series diesel railcar generates its power from a 12-cylinder Mercedes-Benz OM444 or MTU 12V183TC12 V-engine with a displacement of 21.93 liters and an output of 419 kW (570 hp). The same engine is also installed in the DB Class 628.2 railcars and in the 627.1 and 628.1 series without intercooling. Power is transmitted via a turbo gearbox with two Föttinger torque converters and a hydrodynamic brake. To increase the cooling capacity of the transmission oil, the engine speed is increased when the hydro brake is actuated. The bogie is driven on the side facing away from the multi-purpose compartment. This bogie also accommodates the magnets for the Indusi or, more recently, the PZB. The magnetic rail brake is attached to the running bogie under the multi-purpose room.

Originally, all 5047s were equipped with an Indusi I60 system, analog train radio and GPS for train control operation. With the switch to GSM-R radio, the radios were also replaced. Since 2022, the Indusi has gradually been replaced by a PZB90.

From the 61st railcar delivered (5047 061), all subsequent railcars were equipped with a vacuum toilet instead of a downpipe, with the exception of those for the Steiermärkische Landesbahnen.

== Train services ==
The train service is operated by Austrian Federal Railways (ÖBB) on the following routes:

- St. Pölten Hbf - Hainfeld/Schrambach
- St. Pölten Hbf - Krems an der Donau - Horn - Sigmundsherberg
- St. Pölten Hbf - Pöchlarn - Wieselburg - Scheibbs
- Wels - Braunau am Inn - Simbach (Germany)
- Wels - Grünau im Almtal
- Linz Urfahr - Rottenegg - Aigen-Schlägl
- Attnang-Puchheim - Ried im Innkreis - Schärding
- Wien Hbf - Traiskirchen Aspangbahn - Felixdorf - Wiener Neustadt
- Wiener Neustadt - Mattersburg - Sopron (Hungary)
- Leobersdorf - Weissenbach-Neuhaus
