= Kiel Hauptbahnhof =

Main railway station in the northern German city of Kiel

Kiel Hbf
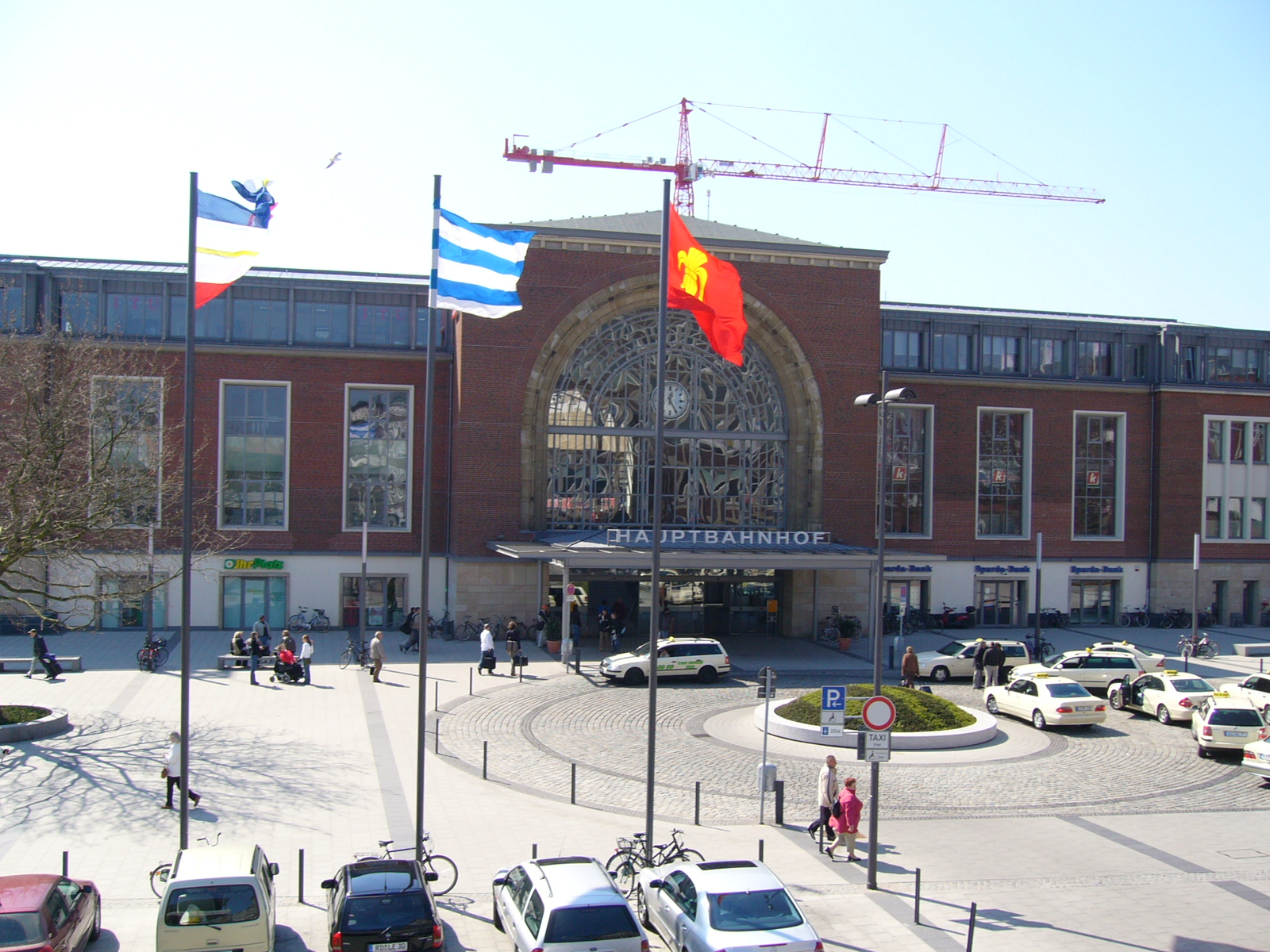
- Main entrance on the north side

General information
- Location: Sophienblatt 25-27, Kiel, Schleswig-Holstein; Germany
- Coordinates: 54°18′53″N 10°07′54″E
- Owner: DB Netz
- Operator: DB Station&Service
- Lines: Kiel–Eckernförde–Flensburg; Kiel–Eutin–Lübeck; Kiel–Rendsburg; Kiel–Neumünster–Hamburg; Kiel–Schönberger Strand; Kiel–Bad Segeberg (closed)
- Platforms: 8
- Train operators: DB Fernverkehr; DB Regio Nord

Construction
- Accessible: Yes
- Architectural style: Baroque Revival

Other information
- Station code: 3174
- DS100 code: AK
- IBNR: 8000199
- Category: 2
- Website: www.bahnhof.de

History
- Opened: 1899
- Former names: 1899-1927 Bahnhof Kiel
Services
Preceding station	DB Fernverkehr	Following station
Neumünster towards Stuttgart Hbf	ICE 22	Terminus
Neumünster towards Praha hl.n.	RJ 27	Terminus
Neumünster towards München Hbf	ICE 28	Terminus
Preceding station	DB Regio Nord	Following station
Flintbek towards Hamburg Hbf	RE 7	Terminus
Bordesholm towards Hamburg Hbf	RE 70	Terminus
Preceding station		Following station
Suchsdorf towards Eckernförde	RE 72	Terminus
Kiel-Hassee CITTI-PARK towards Husum	RE 74	Terminus
Kiel-Hassee CITTI-PARK towards Husum	RB 74	Terminus
Kiel-Hassee CITTI-PARK towards Rieseby Schleibrücke Süd	RB 73	Terminus
Kiel-Hassee CITTI-PARK towards Rendsburg	RB 75	Terminus
Preceding station		Following station
Raisdorf towards Lüneburg	RE 83	Terminus
Kiel Schulen am Langsee towards Kiel-Oppendorf	RB 76	Terminus
Kiel-Elmschenhagen towards Lübeck Hbf	RB 84	Terminus
Location

Kiel Hauptbahnhof is the main railway station in the northern German city of Kiel. It consists of eight rail tracks and is a central hub for regional and long-distance passenger transport. There are regular connections to other cities in Schleswig-Holstein as well as to larger cities in Germany, such as Hamburg and Berlin.

With around 37,000 travelers and visitors a day, it is the largest and busiest train station in Schleswig-Holstein.

== History ==
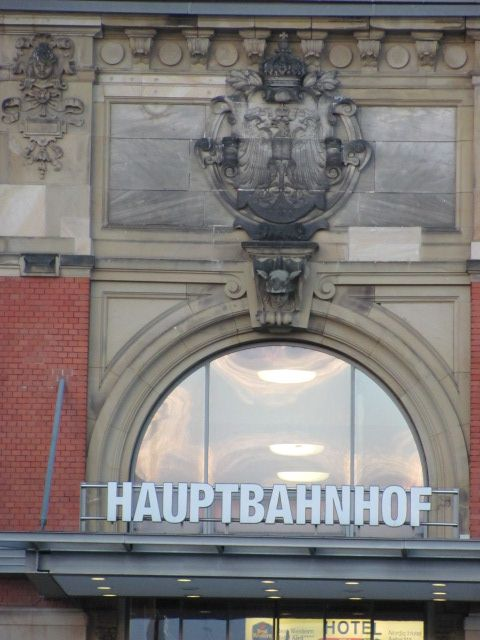
Eagle over the eastern entrance of the former imperial waiting rooms in 2010

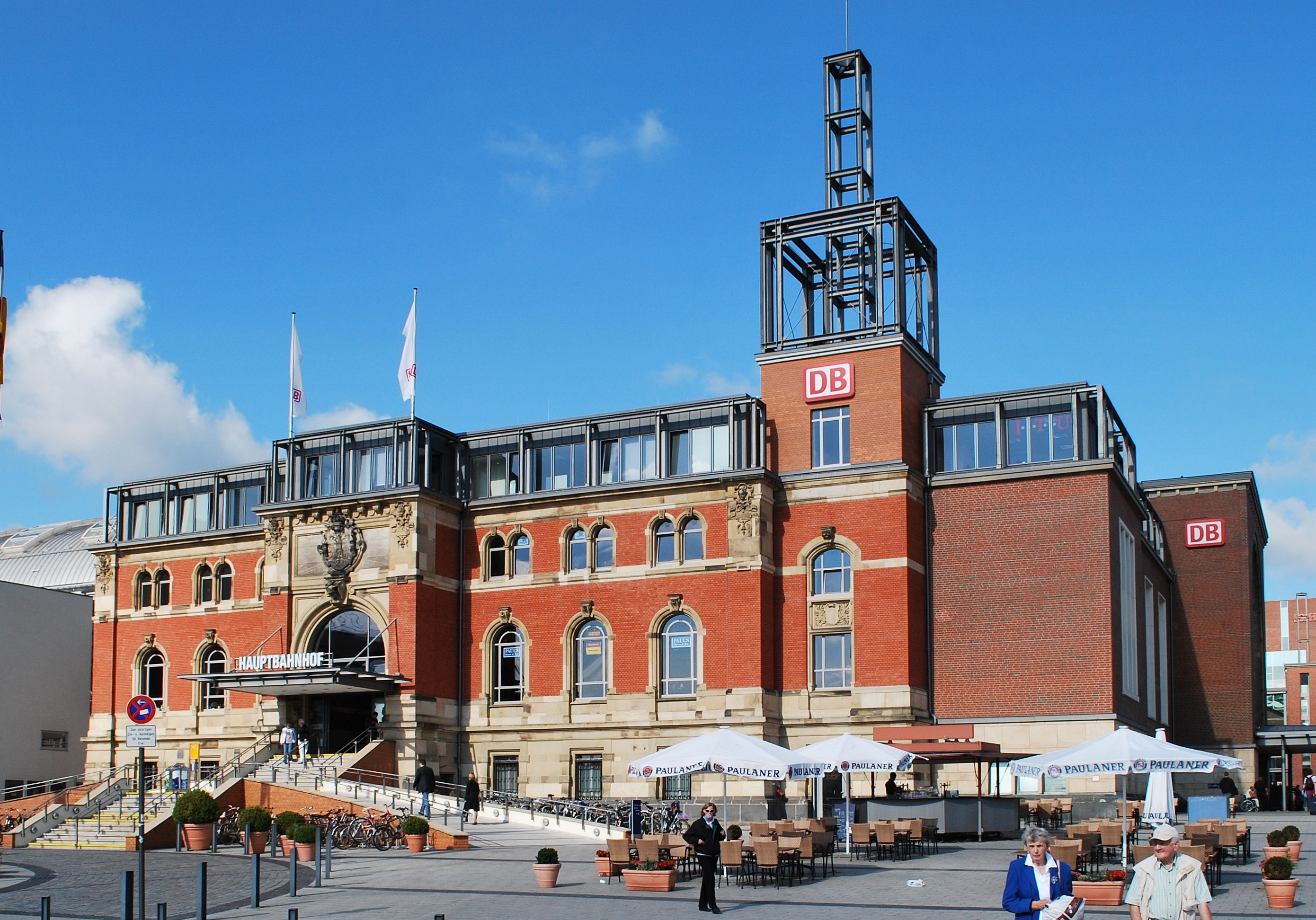
Imperial steps and east side ramp, looking to the west in 2008.

Kiel's first railway station was built between 1843 and 1846 at Ziegelteich, about 500 m north of the current location. This station was unable to cope with the growing traffic, especially after the declaration of the Reichskriegshäfen ("Imperial War Harbours") in Kiel in 1871. The current location was selected for its improved access to the port by road. Construction began in 1895.

The western part of the six-track terminal station was completed and opened in 1899. Trains continued to run in the meantime to the old station through a gap in the east wing. After the opening of the new station, operations to the old station were abandoned and the east wing was completed in 1900. The old station was demolished in 1902. On the east side of the entrance building were the imperial steps (Kaisertreppe), which together with a curved driveway provided the shortest possible route to the harbour basin where the imperial yacht was berthed. The final completion of the west wing and the platform hall lasted until 1911 because, among other things, the city monastery and a poorhouse on Sophienblatt, had to be demolished.

In 1944, the station and the adjacent magnificent buildings were severely damaged by the Allies in a heavy air raid. Starting in 1950, the station was rebuilt in a simplified form. The restaurant was located in the eastern part of the entrance building, so that the imperial staircase was no longer available as an entrance. In the 1950s, the station environment was transformed. In particular, the access street of Sophienblatt was greatly broadened.

In preparation for the 1972 Summer Olympics, an elevated parking deck was built on the north side of the station forecourt, covering the central bus station, which was at ground level. The pedestrian connection between the railway station and the bus station across the forecourt at the time was effected by means of a pedestrian walk covered by a light steel structure, leading out of the main entrance arch of the railway station and ending at the raised parking level. In the station, a level for shopping was inserted in the station concourse and around the north entrance, which halved the historical ceiling heights. The parking deck and the central bus station underneath it was partly demolished from 2009 to 2010, reducing it by nearly a third at its southern end closest to the station. A hotel of the "Atlantic" chain was built there. It opened in June 2010 and cost around €23 million to build.

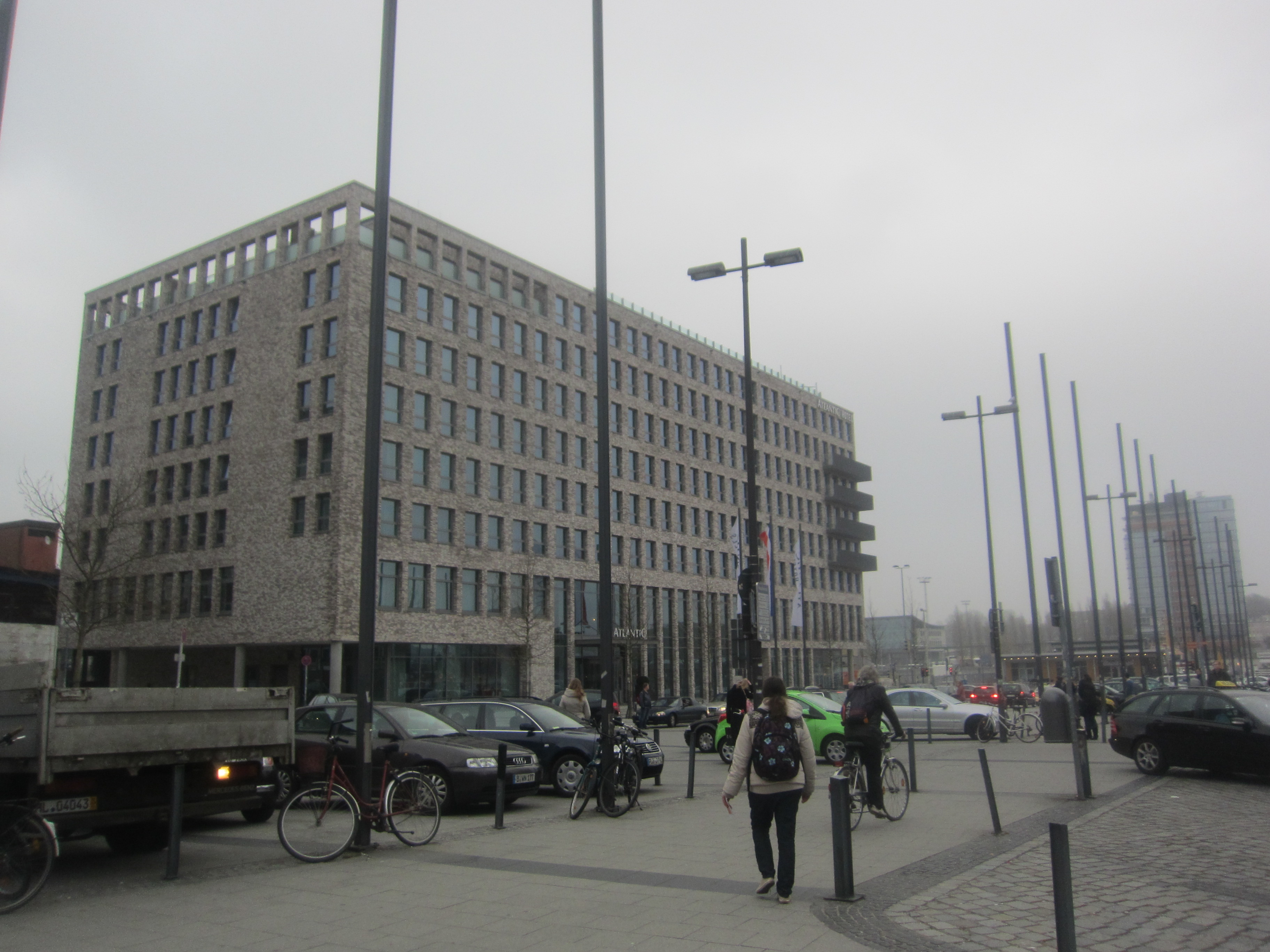
Hotel Atlantic opposite the Hauptbahnhof

A pedestrian bridge that was built to connect the Sophienhof shopping centre, built in 1988, and the station building has affected the architecture of the building.

On the eastern side towards the harbour, the Erlebniszentrum (“experience centre”) CAP was rebuilt in 1994/1995 with several restaurants and a large cinema. It has direct access at platform height from the easternmost platform. In 2010, the CAP had its second renovation, essentially involving changes in its passageway and entrance areas while retaining some local businesses, including a bowling alley and a discotheque.

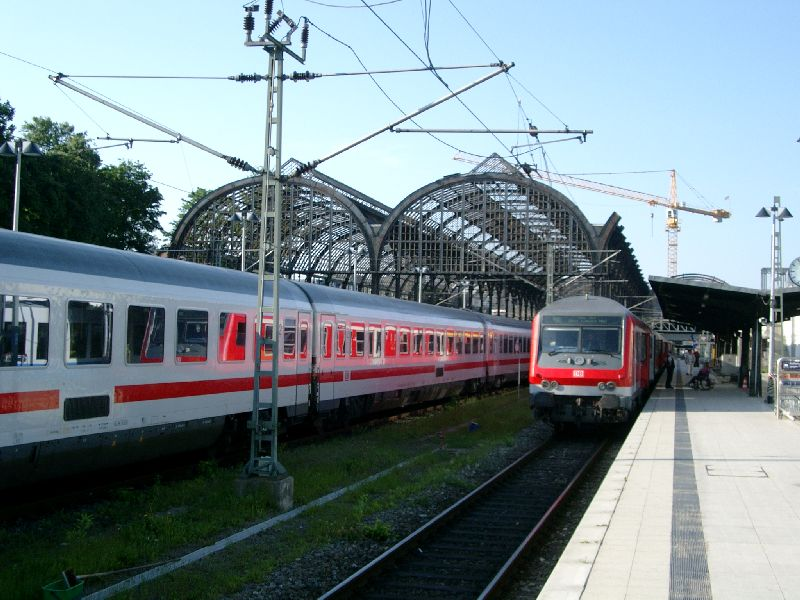
Kiel station during reconstruction in 2003 from the north

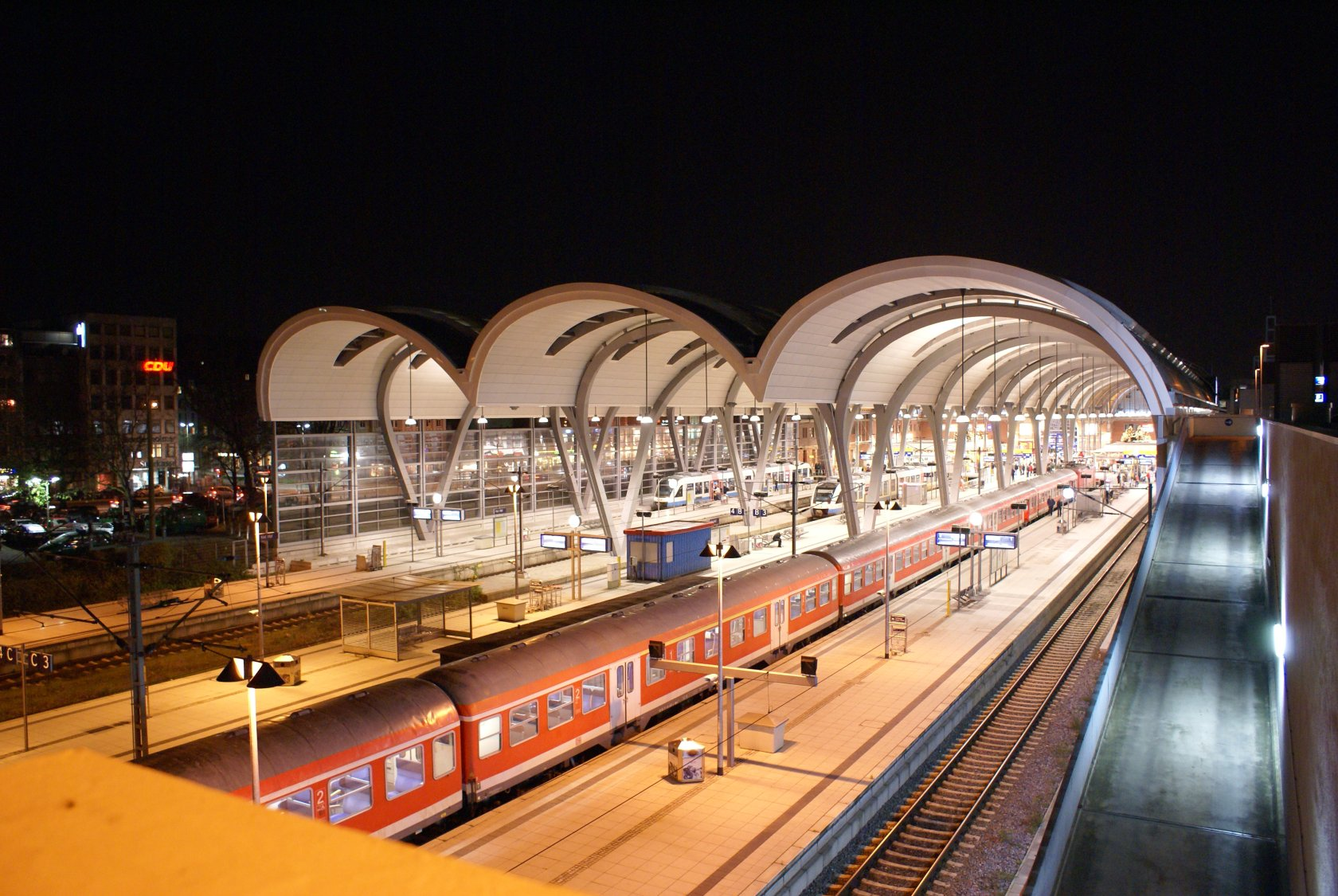
Renovated Kiel Hauptbahnhof at night in 2006 from the north

The railway to Hamburg was electrified in 1995. Since then Intercity-Express trains start and end here daily.

In 1999, a comprehensive renovation of the station started. Among other things, it received a new lobby. The intermediate level of the historic hall was removed and thus the former ceiling height were restored. The pedestrian walkway to the bus station on the north side of the station was demolished without replacement and the pedestrian walkway to the Sophienhof shopping centre was replaced by a steel and glass structure. The redesigned station forecourt and the foyer with shops on the concourse were inaugurated for Kiel Week in June 2004. The imperial steps on the east side have been restored. Due to financial and technical difficulties, the reconstruction was interrupted several times and only concluded in May 2006 with the completion of a new station hall, only the cross-walk at the end of the platforms is still in its original condition although it has been refurbished. The total cost of the conversion amounted to €60 million. The cost for the work in the station hall was estimated to cost around €30 million. From 2013, there will be a further renovation of the station with the creation of tracks 2a and 6a. Track 2a was built outside the train shed with a connection to the platform for tracks 1 and 2. Tracks 6a is also built outside the train shed with a connection to the platform for tracks 5 and 6. These are needed to cope with the additional traffic on the Kiel-Rendsburg (-Fockbek) route and the Kiel–Schönberger Strand route from 2014.

== Routes ==
Regular services to the station operate on the following lines:

- Kiel–Eckernförde–Flensburg
- Kiel–Eutin–Lübeck
- Kiel–Rendsburg
- Kiel–Neumünster–Hamburg

=== Occasionally operated line ===
Kiel–Schönberger Strand; from 1897 to 1911 and from 1954 to 1981, the passenger trains of the Kiel–Schönberger railway terminated at the station. Especially on weekends in the summer months, special trains ran to Schoenberg beach; in some years there was even a fixed timetable. Since September 2013, daily school trains have operated to the recently completed Kiel Schulen am Langsee station.

=== Closed and dismantled line ===
The trains of the narrow-gauge Kiel–Segeberg railway had its terminus at the Hauptbahnhof from 1 July 1954, but services ended on this line in 1961.

== Rail services ==
The station is served by the following services.

=== Long distance services ===
In the 2026 timetable, the following long-distance services stop at the station:

Line	Route	Frequency
ICE 22	Stuttgart – Mannheim – Frankfurt – Hanover – Hamburg – Kiel	Five train pairs
RJ 27	Kiel – Hamburg – Berlin – Dresden – Prague	One train pair
ICE 28	Munich – Nuremberg – Leipzig – Berlin – Hamburg – Kiel	One train pair

=== Regional services ===
In the 2026 timetable, the following regional services stop at the station:

Train class	Route	Timetable route
RE 7	Kiel – Flintbek – Bordesholm – Einfeld – Neumünster – Elmshorn – Hamburg Dammtor – Hamburg Hbf	103
RE 70	Kiel – Bordesholm – Neumünster – Wrist – Elmshorn – Pinneberg – Hamburg Dammtor – Hamburg	103
RE 72	Kiel – Suchsdorf – Gettorf – Eckernförde – Rieseby – Süderbrarup – Sörup – Husby – Flensburg	146
RB 73	Kiel – Kiel-Hassee CITTI-PARK – Kronshagen – Suchsdorf – Gettorf – Eckernförde	146
RE 74	Kiel – Rendsburg – Schleswig – Husum	134
RB 75	Kiel – Kiel-Hassee CITTI-PARK – Kiel-Russee – Melsdorf – Achterwehr – Felde – Bredenbek – Schülldorf – Rendsburg	134
RB 76	Kiel – Kiel-Schulen am Langsee – Kiel-Ellerbek – Oppendorf	133
RE 83	Kiel – Raisdorf – Preetz – Plön – Bad Malente-Gremsmühlen – Eutin – Bad Schwartau – Lübeck Hauptbahnhof – Lübeck Flughafen – Ratzeburg – Mölln – Büchen – Lauenburg (Elbe) – Echem – Lüneburg	145
RB 84	Kiel – Kiel-Elmschenhagen – Raisdorf – Preetz – Ascheberg – Plön – Bad Malente-Gremsmühlen – Eutin – Pönitz – Pansdorf – Bad Schwartau – Lübeck	145

== See also ==
- Rail transport in Germany
- Railway stations in Germany
