= Ascheberg (Holstein) =

- Municipality
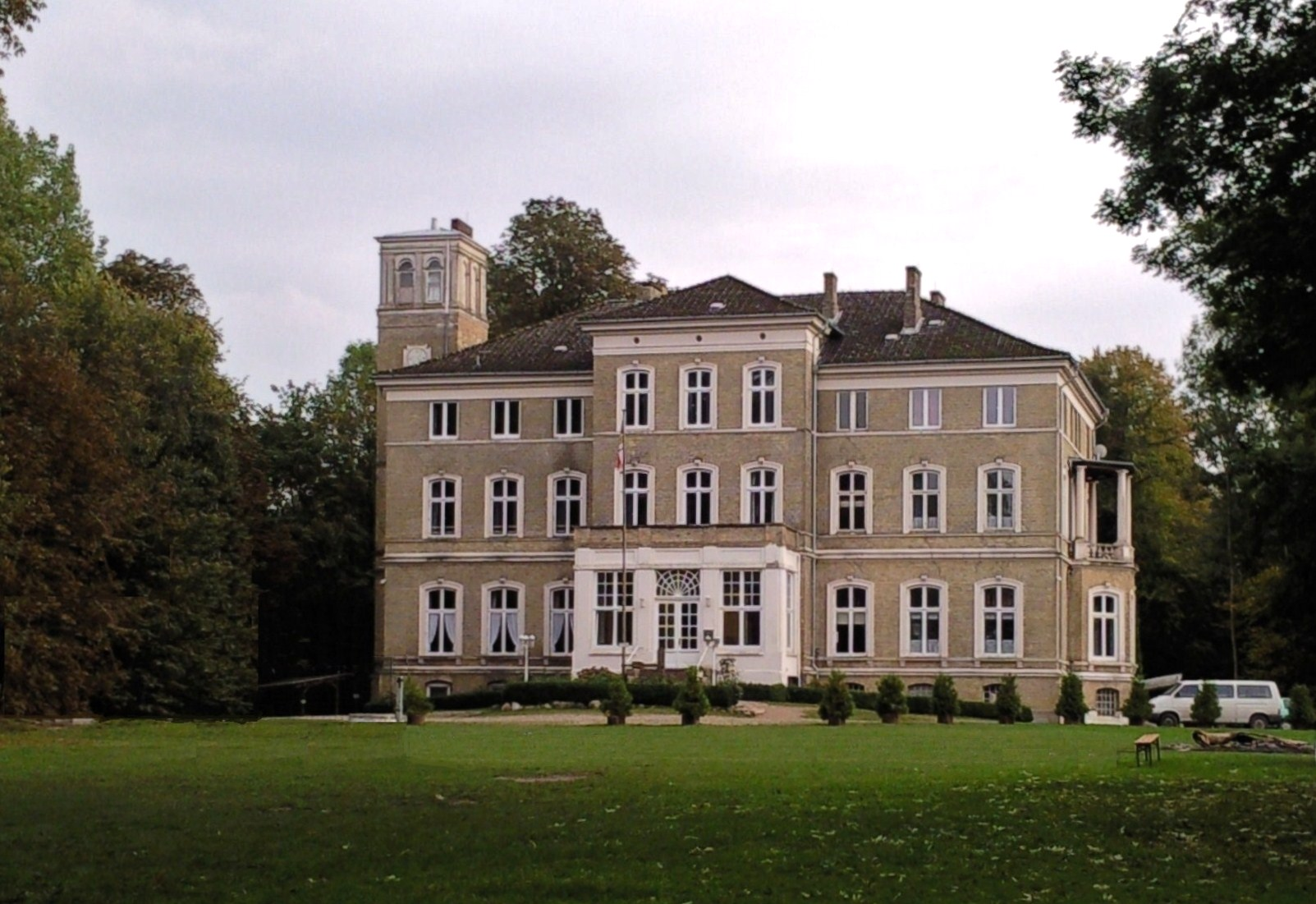
- Manor house Ascheberg

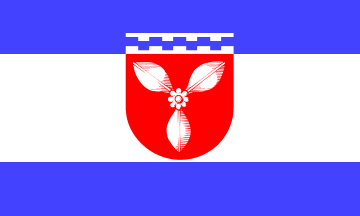
- Flag Coat of arms

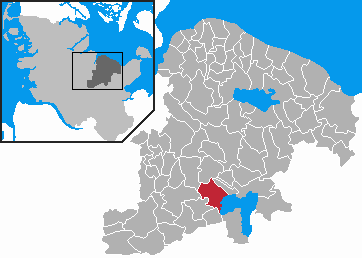
- Location of Ascheberg (Holstein) within Plön district
- Interactive map of Ascheberg (Holstein)
- Location within Germany Location within Schleswig-Holstein
- Coordinates: 54°9′1″N 10°20′42″E
- Country: Germany
- State: Schleswig-Holstein
- District: Plön

Government
  - Mayor: Thomas Menzel

Area
  - Total: 20.94 km^{2} (8.08 sq mi)
- Elevation: 36 m (118 ft)

Population (2025-12-31)
  - Total: 3,236
  - Density: 154.5/km^{2} (400.2/sq mi)
- Time zone: UTC+01:00 (CET)
  - Summer (DST): UTC+02:00 (CEST)
- Postal codes: 24326
- Dialling codes: 04526
- Vehicle registration: PLÖ

Ascheberg (Holstein) (German pronunciation: [ˈaʃəbɛʁk]) is a municipality in the district of Plön, in Schleswig-Holstein, Germany.
