= List of railway stations in Schleswig-Holstein =

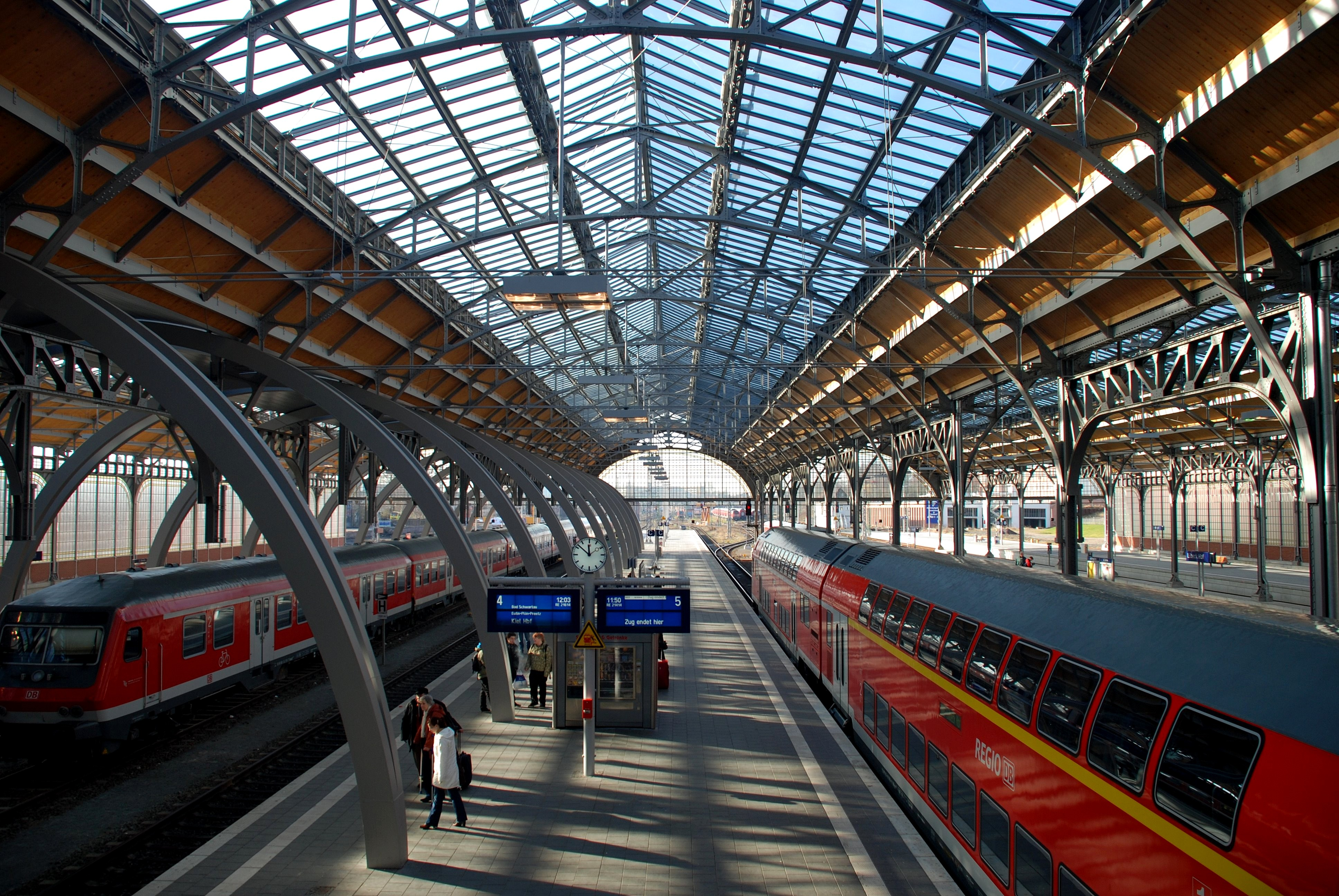
The station hall at Lübeck central station (Hauptbahnhof)

This list covers all the passenger railway stations and halts in Schleswig-Holstein, a state in northern Germany, that are served by timetabled services.

== Description ==
The list is organised as follows:

- Name: This is the current name of the station or halt.
- Urban/Rural County (Kreis): This column gives the urban or rural county (Kreis) in which the station is located. Where abbreviations are used, these correspond to those used on German vehicle number plates. The following is a list of the urban and rural counties in Schleswig-Holstein with their abbreviations:
- Flensburg (FL)
- Dithmarschen (HEI)
- Hansestadt Lübeck (HL)
- Steinburg (IZ)
- Kiel (KI)
- Nordfriesland (NF)
- Neumünster (NMS)
- Stormarn (OD)
- Ostholstein (OH)
- Pinneberg (PI)
- Plön (district) (PLÖ)
- Rendsburg-Eckernförde (RD)
- Herzogtum Lauenburg (RZ)
- Segeberg (SE)
- Schleswig-Flensburg (SL)
- Railway operator: Schleswig-Holstein has three railway operators integrated into the SPNV. These are the Hamburger Verkehrsverbund (HVV) in the south of the state, the Tarifgemeinschaft Lübeck (TGL) in the area of the Hanseatic city of Lübeck and the Verkehrsverbund Region Kiel (VRK)
- Cat: The Cat column shows the current category of the station as at 1 January 2012. This only affects stations run by DB Station&Service and excludes stations run by private operators, like the Norddeutsche Eisenbahngesellschaft (neg).
- The five following columns show the type of trains that stop at the station. The individual abbreviations used are based on the train classifications used for DB AG trains, but may also refer to the equivalent services of other operators:
  - ICE – Intercity-Express and the like
  - IC – Intercity, Eurocity and the like
  - RE – Regional-Express and the like
  - RB – Regionalbahn and the like
  - S – S-Bahn
- Line – This column gives the railway line on which the station is situated. Only routes that are still in service on this section are named, e.g. the stations at Elmshorn and Bad Oldesloe are both on the Elmshorn-Barmstedt-Oldesloe line, however this is only working between Elmshorn and Henstedt-Ulzburg.
- Remarks – In this column additional information may be given that is not covered elsewhere, especially the name of the railway operator.

== Station overview ==
Station	City/ District (Kreis)	Railway operator	Cat	ICE	IC	RE	RB	S	Line	Remarks
Ahrensburg	OD	HVV	4			x	x		Lübeck–Hamburg	
Ahrensburg-Gartenholz	OD	HVV	7				x		Lübeck–Hamburg	
Albersdorf	HEI		7				x		Neumünster–Heide	
Altengörs	SE	HVV	7				x		Neumünster–Bad Oldesloe	Request stop
Alveslohe	SE	HVV					x		Elmshorn–Bad Oldesloe	Owner: AKN
Ascheberg (Holst)	PLÖ	VRK	5			x			Kiel–Lübeck	
Aukrug	RD		7				x		Neumünster–Heide	
Aumühle	RZ	HVV	4				x	x	Berlin–Hamburg	
Bad Bramstedt	SE	HVV					x		Eidelstedt–Neumünster	Owner: AKN
Bad Bramstedt Kurhaus	SE	HVV					x		Eidelstedt–Neumünster	Owner: AKN
Bad Malente-Gremsmühlen	OH		5			x			Kiel–Lübeck	
Bad Oldesloe	OD	HVV	2			x	x		Lübeck–Hamburg; Neumünster–Bad Oldesloe	
Bad Schwartau	OH		5			x	x		Kiel–Lübeck; Lübeck–Puttgarden	
Bad Segeberg	SE	HVV	5				x		Neumünster–Bad Oldesloe	
Bad St. Peter-Ording	NF		6				x		Husum–Bad St. Peter-Ording	
Bad St. Peter Süd	NF		7				x		Husum–Bad St. Peter-Ording	
Bargteheide	OD	HVV	4				x		Lübeck–Hamburg	
Barmstedt	PI	HVV					x		Elmshorn–Bad Oldesloe	Owner: AKN
Barmstedt Brunnenstraße	PI	HVV					x		Elmshorn–Bad Oldesloe	Owner: AKN
Beldorf	RD		7				x		Neumünster–Heide	
Beringstedt	RD		7				x		Neumünster–Heide	
Bokholt	PI	HVV					x		Elmshorn–Bad Oldesloe	Owner: AKN
Bönningstedt	PI	HVV					x		Eidelstedt–Neumünster	Owner: AKN
Boostedt	SE	HVV					x		Eidelstedt–Neumünster	Owner: AKN
Bordesholm	RD	VRK	5				x		Hamburg–Kiel	
Bredstedt	NF		5				x		Elmshorn–Westerland	
Brokstedt	IZ		6				x		Hamburg–Kiel	
Büchen	RZ	HVV	3		x	x	x		Berlin–Hamburg; Lübeck–Lüneburg	
Burg (Dithm)	HEI		6				x		Elmshorn–Westerland	
Büsum	HEI		6				x		Heide–Büsum	
Dagebüll Hafen	NF				x		x		Niebüll–Dagebüll	Owner: neg IC through coach
Dagebüll Kirche	NF				x		x		Niebüll–Dagebüll	Owner: neg IC through coach
Dagebüll Mole	NF				x		x		Niebüll–Dagebüll	Owner: neg IC through coach
Dauenhof	PI	HVV	6				x		Hamburg–Kiel	
Deezbüll	NF				x		x		Niebüll–Dagebüll	Owner: neg IC through coach
Dodenhof	SE	HVV					x		Eidelstedt–Neumünster	Owner: AKN
Eckernförde	RD		5				x		Kiel–Flensburg	
Einfeld	NMS		6				x		Hamburg–Kiel	
Ellerau	SE	HVV					x		Eidelstedt–Neumünster	Owner: AKN
Elmshorn	PI	HVV	3			x	x		Elmshorn–Bad Oldesloe; Elmshorn–Westerland; Hamburg–Kiel	
Eutin	OH		5			x			Kiel–Lübeck	
Fahrenkrug	SE	HVV	7				x		Neumünster–Bad Oldesloe	
Felde	RD	VRK	7				x		Kiel–Osterrönfeld	
Fehmarn-Burg	OH				x	x			Lübeck–Puttgarden	
Flensburg	FL		3	x		x	x		Flensburg–Fredericia; Kiel–Flensburg; Neumünster–Flensburg	
Flensburg Weiche	FL		6				x		Neumünster–Flensburg	
Flintbek	RD	VRK	6				x		Hamburg–Kiel	
Fresenburg	OD	HVV	7				x		Neumünster–Bad Oldesloe	Request stop
Friedrichsgabe	SE	HVV					x		Ochsenzoll–Ulzburg	Owner: AKN
Friedrichsruh	RZ	HVV	7				x		Berlin–Hamburg	
Friedrichstadt	NF		6				x		Elmshorn–Westerland	
Garding	NF		7				x		Husum–Bad St. Peter-Ording	
Gettorf	RD	VRK	5				x		Kiel–Flensburg	
Glückstadt	IZ		5				x		Elmshorn–Westerland	
Gokels	RD		7				x		Neumünster–Heide	
Großenaspe	SE	HVV					x		Eidelstedt–Neumünster	Owner: AKN
Großenbrode	OH		6				x		Lübeck–Puttgarden	
Hademarschen	RD		7				x		Neumünster–Heide	
Haffkrug	OH		6		x		x		Lübeck–Puttgarden	
Halstenbek	PI		4					x	Hamburg–Kiel	
Harblek	NF		7				x		Husum–Bad St. Peter-Ording	Request stop
Hasloh	PI	HVV					x		Eidelstedt–Neumünster	Owner: AKN
Haslohfurth	SE	HVV					x		Ochsenzoll–Ulzburg	Owner: AKN
Heide (Holst)	HEI		3		x		x		Elmshorn–Westerland; Heide–Büsum; Neumünster–Heide	
Henstedt-Ulzburg	SE	HVV					x		Eidelstedt–Neumünster; Elmshorn–Bad Oldesloe	Owner: AKN
Herzhorn	IZ		6				x		Elmshorn–Westerland	
Hohenwestedt	RD		6				x		Neumünster–Heide	
Holstentherme	SE	HVV					x		Eidelstedt–Neumünster	Owner: AKN
Horst (Holst)	PI	HVV	6				x		Hamburg–Kiel	
Husby	SL		6				x		Kiel–Flensburg	
Husum	NF		3		x		x		Elmshorn–Westerland; Jübek–Husum; Rendsburg–Husum; Husum–Bad St. Peter-Ording	
Itzehoe	IZ		3		x		x		Elmshorn–Westerland	
Jarrenwisch	HEI		7				x		Heide–Büsum	Request stop
Jübek	SL		6				x		Jübek–Husum; Neumünster–Flensburg	
Kaltenkirchen	SE	HVV					x		Eidelstedt–Neumünster	Owner: AKN
Kaltenkirchen Süd	SE	HVV					x		Eidelstedt–Neumünster	Owner: AKN
Kappeln	SL								Schleswig–Kappeln	Owner: Angelner Eisenbahn Gesellschaft
Katharinenheerd	NF		7				x		Husum–Bad St. Peter-Ording	
Kating	NF		7				x		Husum–Bad St. Peter-Ording	Request stop
Keitum	NF		4		x		x		Elmshorn–Westerland	
Kiel Hauptbahnhof	KI	VRK	2	x	x	x	x		Hamburg–Kiel; Kiel-Osterrönfeld; Kiel–Flensburg; Kiel–Lübeck; Kiel–Schönberg	
Kiel-Hassee CITTIPARK	KI	VRK	6				x		Kiel-Osterrönfeld; Kiel–Flensburg	
Kiel-Elmschenhagen	KI	VRK	7				x		Kiel–Lübeck	
Klanxbüll	NF		5		x		x		Elmshorn–Westerland	
Krempe	IZ		6				x		Elmshorn–Westerland	
Kremperheide	IZ		6				x		Elmshorn–Westerland	
Krupunder	PI	HVV	5					x	Hamburg–Kiel	
Kupfermühle	OD	HVV	6				x		Lübeck–Hamburg	
Langeln	PI	HVV					x		Elmshorn–Bad Oldesloe	Owner: AKN
Langenhorn (Schlesw)	NF		6				x		Elmshorn–Westerland	
Langenmoor	PI	HVV					x		Elmshorn–Bad Oldesloe	Owner: AKN
Lauenburg (Elbe)	RZ	HVV	6				x		Lübeck–Lüneburg	
Lentföhrden	SE	HVV					x		Eidelstedt–Neumünster	Owner: AKN
Lensahn	OH		7				x		Lübeck–Puttgarden	
Lübeck Flughafen	HL	TGL	6				x		Lübeck–Lüneburg	
Lübeck Hauptbahnhof	HL	TGL	2	x	x	x	x		Kiel–Lübeck; Lübeck–Bad Kleinen; Lübeck–Hamburg; Lübeck–Lüneburg; Lübeck–Puttgarden; Lübeck–Travemünde	
Lübeck-St. Jürgen	HL	TGL	6			x			Lübeck–Bad Kleinen	
Lübeck-Kücknitz	HL	TGL	6			x			Lübeck–Travemünde	
Lübeck-Moisling	HL		5			x			Lübeck–Hamburg	
Lübeck-Travemünde Hafen	HL	TGL	6			x			Lübeck–Travemünde	
Lübeck-Travemünde Skandinavienkai	HL	TGL	6			x			Lübeck–Travemünde	
Lübeck-Travemünde Strand	HL	TGL	6			x			Lübeck–Travemünde	
Lunden	HEI		6				x		Elmshorn–Westerland	
Maasbüll	NF				x		x		Niebüll–Dagebüll	Owner: neg IC through coach
Meeschensee	SE	HVV					x		Ochsenzoll–Ulzburg	Owner: AKN
Meldorf	HEI		6				x		Elmshorn–Westerland	
Mölln (Lauenburg)	RZ	HVV	5				x		Lübeck–Lüneburg	
Moorbekhalle	SE	HVV					x		Ochsenzoll–Ulzburg	Owner: AKN
Morsum (Sylt)	NF		5		x		x		Elmshorn–Westerland	
Müssen	RZ	HVV	6			x	x		Berlin–Hamburg	
Neumünster	NMS		2	x	x	x	x		Eidelstedt–Neumünster; Hamburg–Kiel; Neumünster–Bad Olsdesloe; Neumünster–Flensburg; Neumünster–Heide	
Neumünster Stadtwald	NMS		7				x		Neumünster–Heide	
Neumünster Süd	NMS						x		Eidelstedt–Neumünster; Neumünster–Bad Oldesloe	Owner: AKN
Neustadt (Holst)	OH		6				x		Lübeck–Puttgarden	
Niebüll	NF		3		x		x		Elmshorn–Westerland; Niebüll–Dagebüll; Niebüll–Tønder	two stations: Niebüll DB & Niebüll neg
Norderstedt Mitte	SE	HVV					x		Ochsenzoll–Ulzburg	Owner: AKN
Nordhastedt	HEI		7				x		Neumünster–Heide	
Nortorf	RD		6			x	x		Neumünster–Flensburg	
Nützen	SE	HVV					x		Eidelstedt–Neumünster	Owner: AKN
Oldenburg (Holst)	OD		6	x	x		x		Lübeck–Puttgarden	
Osterstedt	RD		7				x		Neumünster–Heide	
Owschlag	RD		5				x		Neumünster–Flensburg	
Pansdorf	OH		6			x			Kiel–Lübeck	
Pinneberg	PI	HVV	3			x	x	x	Hamburg–Kiel	
Plön	PLÖ	VRK	6			x			Kiel–Lübeck	
Pönitz (Holst)	OH		6			x			Kiel–Lübeck	
Preetz	PLÖ	VRK	5			x	x		Kiel–Lübeck	
Prisdorf	PI	HVV	5				x		Hamburg–Kiel	
Puttgarden	OH		6	x	x		x		Lübeck–Puttgarden	
Quickborn	PI	HVV					x		Eidelstedt–Neumünster	Owner: AKN
Quickborn Süd	PI	HVV					x		Eidelstedt–Neumünster	Owner: AKN
Quickborner Straße	SE	HVV					x		Ochsenzoll–Ulzburg	Owner: AKN
Raisdorf	PLÖ	VRK	5			x	x		Kiel–Lübeck	
Ratzeburg	RZ	HVV	5				x		Lübeck–Lüneburg	
Reinbek	OD	HVV	5					x	Berlin–Hamburg	
Reinfeld (Holst)	OD	HVV	5			x			Lübeck–Hamburg	
Reinsbüttel	HEI		7				x		Heide–Büsum	Request stop
Rendsburg	RD		4	x		x	x		Kiel-Osterrönfeld; Neumünster–Flensburg	
Rickling	SE	HVV	6				x		Neumünster–Bad Oldesloe	
Rieseby	RD		6				x		Kiel–Flensburg	
Sandwehle	NF		7				x		Husum–Bad St. Peter-Ording	Request stop
Scharbeutz	OH		5		x		x		Lübeck–Puttgarden	
Scheggerott	SL								Schleswig–Kappeln	Owner: Angelner Eisenbahn Gesellschaft
Schleswig	SL		5	x		x	x		Neumünster–Flensburg	
Schwarzenbek	RZ	HVV	5			x	x		Berlin–Hamburg	
Sierksdorf	OH		6		x		x		Lübeck–Puttgarden	
Sörup	SL		6				x		Kiel–Flensburg	
Sparrieshoop	PI	HVV					x		Elmshorn–Bad Oldesloe	Owner: AKN
St. Michaelisdonn	HEI		5				x		Elmshorn–Westerland	
Suchsdorf	KI	VRK	6				x		Kiel–Flensburg	
Süderbrarup	SL		6				x		Kiel–Flensburg; Schleswig–Kappeln	
Süderdeich	HEI		7				x		Heide–Büsum	Request stop
Süderlügum	NF						x		Niebüll–Tønder	Owner: NOB
Tanneneck	SE	HVV					x		Eidelstedt–Neumünster	Owner: AKN
Tarp	SL		6			x	x		Neumünster–Flensburg	
Tating	NF		7				x		Husum–Bad St. Peter-Ording	
Thesdorf	PI	HVV	4					x	Hamburg–Kiel	
Tiebensee	HEI		7				x		Heide–Büsum	Request stop
Timmendorfer Strand	OH		5		x		x		Lübeck–Puttgarden	
Tönning	NF		6				x		Husum–Bad St. Peter-Ording	
Tornesch	PI	HVV	5				x		Hamburg–Kiel	
Ulzburg Süd	SE	HVV					x		Eidelstedt–Neumünster; Ochsenzoll–Ulzburg	Owner: AKN
Uphusum	NF						x		Niebüll–Tønder	Owner: NOB
Voßloch	PI	HVV					x		Elmshorn–Bad Oldesloe	Owner: AKN
Wagersrott	SL								Schleswig–Kappeln	Owner: Angelner Eisenbahn Gesellschaft
Wahlstedt	SE	HVV	6				x		Neumünster–Bad Oldesloe	
Wakendorf	SE	HVV	7				x		Neumünster–Bad Oldesloe	
Wasbek	RD		7				x		Neumünster–Heide	
Wedel (Holst)	PI	HVV	5					x	Hamburg–Wedel	
Wesselburen	HEI		7				x		Heide–Büsum	
Westerland	NF		3		x		x		Elmshorn–Westerland	
Wiemersdorf	SE	HVV					x		Eidelstedt–Neumünster	Owner: AKN
Wilster	IZ		6				x		Elmshorn–Westerland	
Witzwort	NF		7				x		Husum–Bad St. Peter-Ording	Request stop
Wohltorf	RZ	HVV	4					x	Berlin–Hamburg	
Wrist	IZ		4			x	x		Hamburg–Kiel	

== See also ==
- German railway station categories
- Railway station types of Germany
