= Gerd Dose =

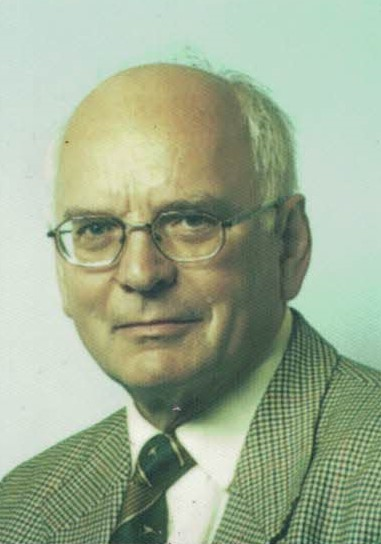
- Born: 9 October 1942; Halstenbek
- Died: 16 July 2010 (aged 67); Großensee (Holstein)
- Known for: Studies in English literature
- Scientific career
- Fields: English Philology
- Workplaces: University of Hamburg

Gerd Dose (born 9 October 1942 in Halstenbek, died 16 July 2010 in Großensee (Holstein)) was a professor of English literature and culture at the University of Hamburg from 1985 to 2007. His main research interests were medieval English literature, English comic literature, cultural studies, Australian studies, and the reception of war and the military in English comic literature. Also, research on constancy and variation in behaviour in Shakespeare's tragedy Coriolanus. He set up "modern English language literatures" as an area of teaching and research.

== Major publications ==
- Adel und Gemeinwesen (Bern / Frankfurt a.M. / Las Vegas, 1977), 234 S. ISBN 978-3-261-02328-5
- "Agatha Christie und nicht P. G. Wodehouse", in Anglistik und Englischunterricht, 17: Learning English Humor, II (Trier, 1982), 9-49.
- "Nachahmung als Illusion", in: H. H. Freitag / P. Hühn (Hg.), Literarische Ansichten der Wirklichkeit, Anglo-American Forum 12 (Bern / Frankfurt a.M./ Cirencester, 1980), S. 1-39.
- "'England Your England': George Orwell on Socialism, Gentleness, and the English Mission", in: Anglistik und Englischunterricht, 46/47: Englishness (Heidelberg, 1992), S. 241–261.
- "Alternate Worlds: Kingsley Amis' The Alteration und Keith Roberts' Pavane", in: R. Ahrens / Fr.-W. Neumann (Hg.), Fiktion und Geschichte in der anglo-amerikanischen Literatur, Festschrift für Heinz- Joachim Müllenbrock zum 60. Geburtstag (Heidelberg: Universitätsverlag C. Winter, 1998), S. 315–338.
- "Oh! What a Lovely War! War and Humour in British Literature, Media and Society", in: Th. F. Schneider (Hg.), Kriegserlebnis und Legendenbildung: Das Bild des "modernen" Krieges in Literatur, Theater, Photographie und Film – The Experience of War and the Creation of Myths: The Image of "Modern" War in Literature, Theatre, Photography, and Film, I [Vor dem Ersten Weltkrieg – Before the First World War] (Osnabrück: Universitätsverlag Rasch, 1999), S. 25 – 33.
- Writing in Australia: Perceptions of Australian Literature in Its Historical and Cultural Context, mit Bettina Keil, 240 Seiten, 2000, ISBN 978-3-8258-2796-0
- So nah und doch so fern: Englische Mentalität und 'Englishness' in Kultur, Gesellschaft und Alltag, Hg., mit Johann N. Schmidt und Egon Tiedje, 212 Seiten, 2005, ISBN 978-3-89586-981-5
- Australia – Making Space Meaningful, ed. mit Britta Kuhlenbeck, Stauffenburg Verlag, Tübingen, 2006, 203 Seiten. ISBN 978-3-86057-756-1
