= Japanische Schule in Hamburg =

- ハンブルグ日本人学校

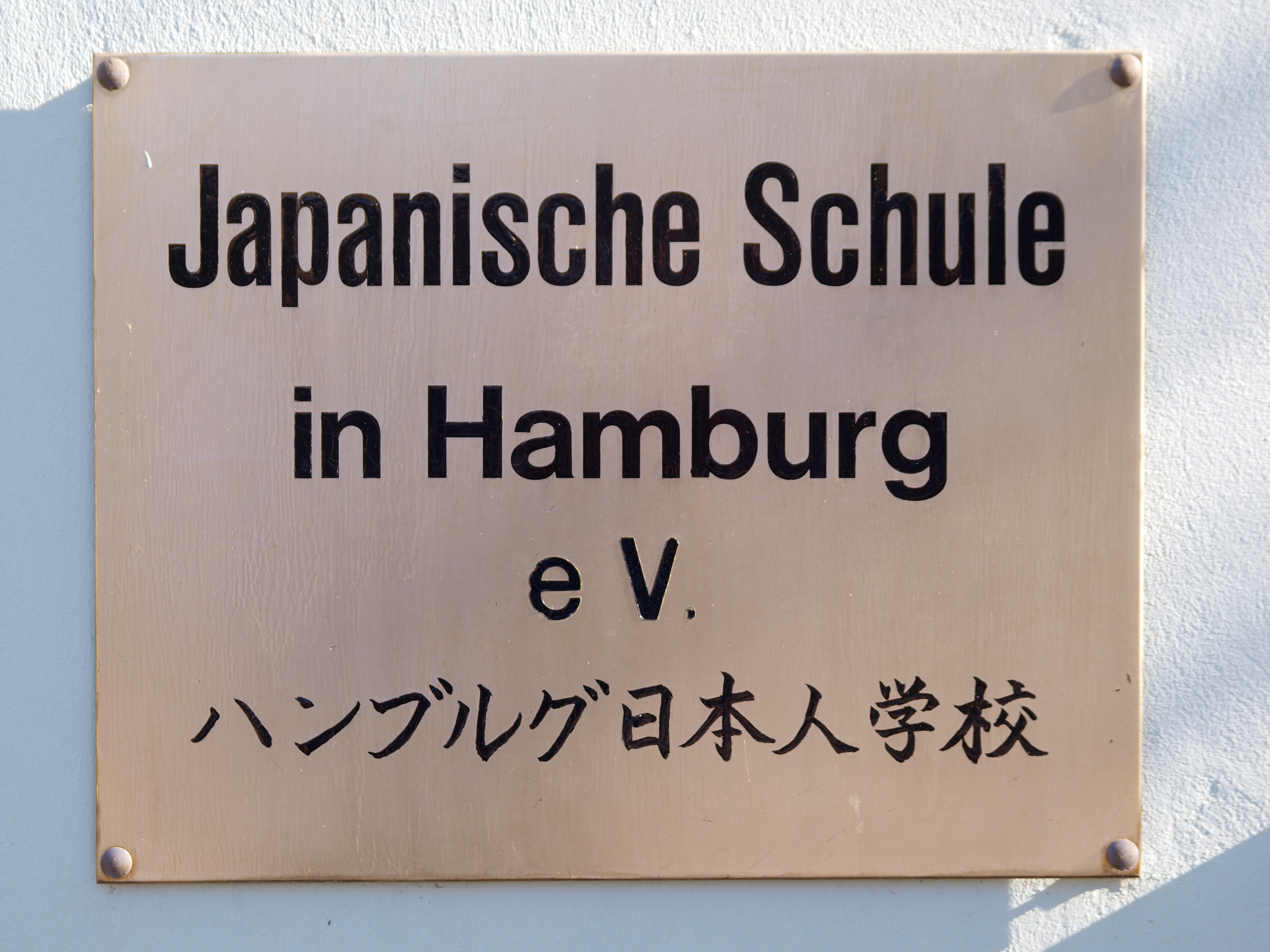

Location
- Dockenhudener Chaussee 77/79 25469 Halstenbek; Halstenbek; Germany; 53.6259°N 9.8329°E

Information
- Type: Primary & middle school
- Grades: 1-9
- Website: homepage.hamburg.de/jshh/

The Japanische Schule in Hamburg e.V. (ハンブルグ日本人学校, Hanburugu Nihonjin Gakkō) is a Japanese international school located in Halstenbek, Schleswig-Holstein, Germany, within the Hamburg Metropolitan Region.

== History ==
The day school was founded on 23 April 1981, with the first campus at Osdorfer Landstraße 390/392 in Hamburg.

The current building in Halstenbek, designed by Architekten R+K, was completed in 1994. The school building has 3,500 square metres (38,000 sq ft) of space and includes athletic facilities. As of 2013 the school had 110 students and 13 teachers; the Japanese government sends the teachers to Germany.

A couple, Jürgen and Christa Heidorn, gave an orchard to the Japanese school.

The Britannica International School is being built on the site of the Japanese school.

The Japanisches Institut Hamburg (ハンブルグ補習授業校 Hanburugu Hoshū Jugyō Kō), a Japanese weekend educational programme, holds its classes in the Hamburg Japanese school building. It has done so since 1994.

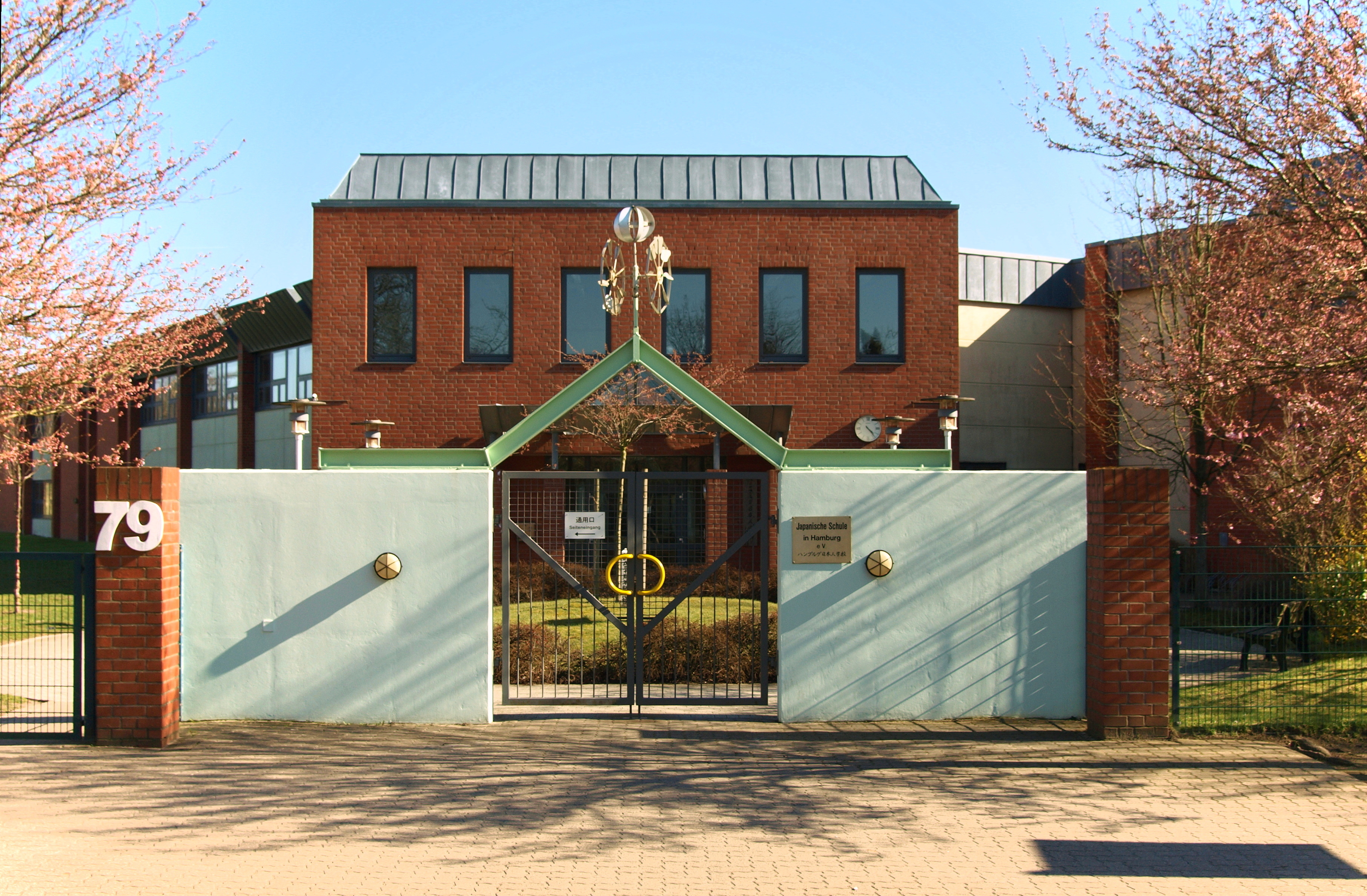
Main entrance

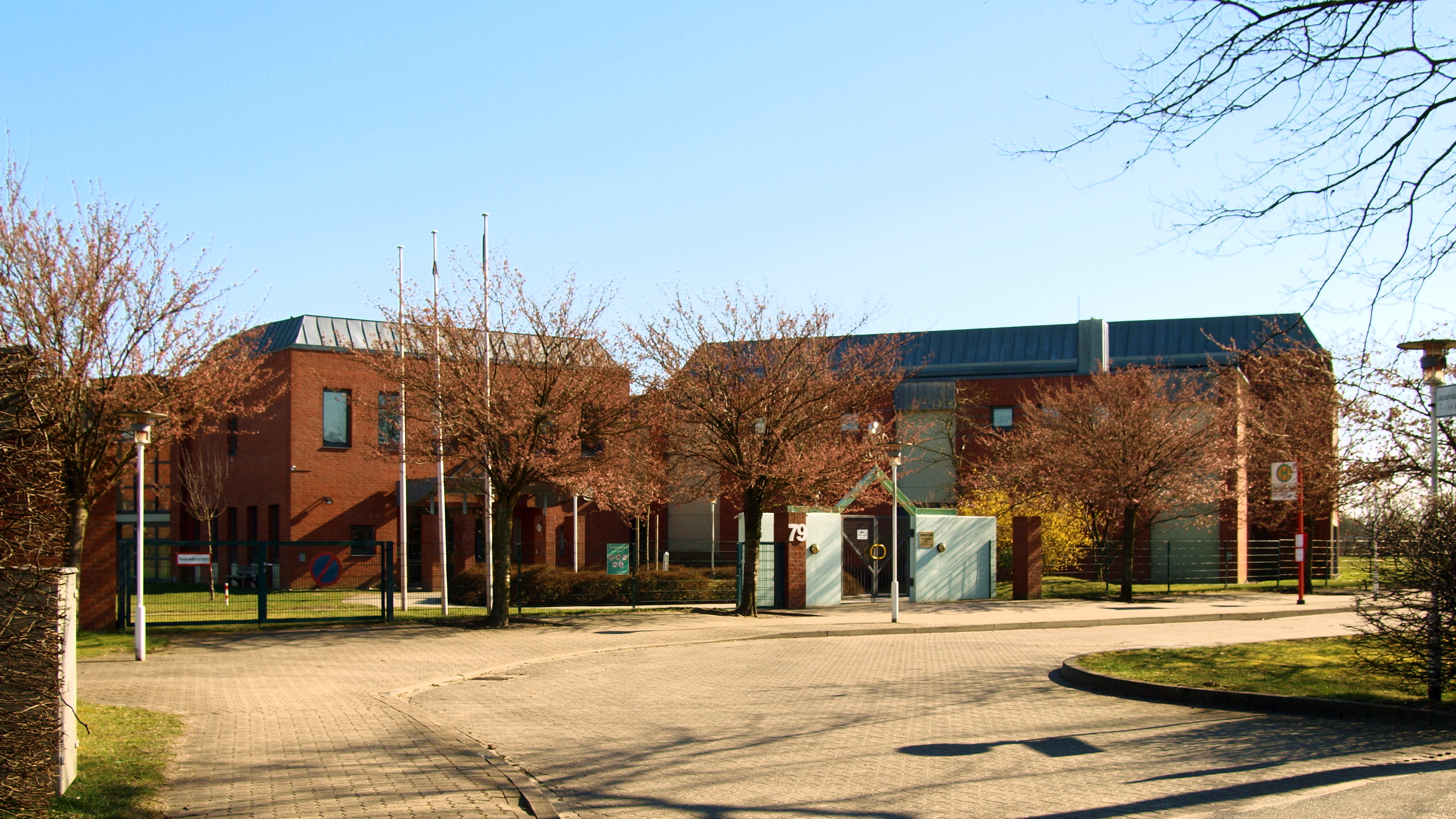
Japanese School

== School culture ==
Haruo Yamashita (山下 晴夫, Yamashita Haruo; 1946-1998) created the lyrics and melody of the school song.

== See also ==
- Japanese people in Germany
- German international schools in Japan:
  - German School Tokyo Yokohama - in Yokohama, Japan
  - Deutsche Schule Kobe/European School
