= Krupunder station =

S Bahn Station in Schleswig-Holstein

Coordinates: 53°36′55″N 9°52′6″E

Krupunder
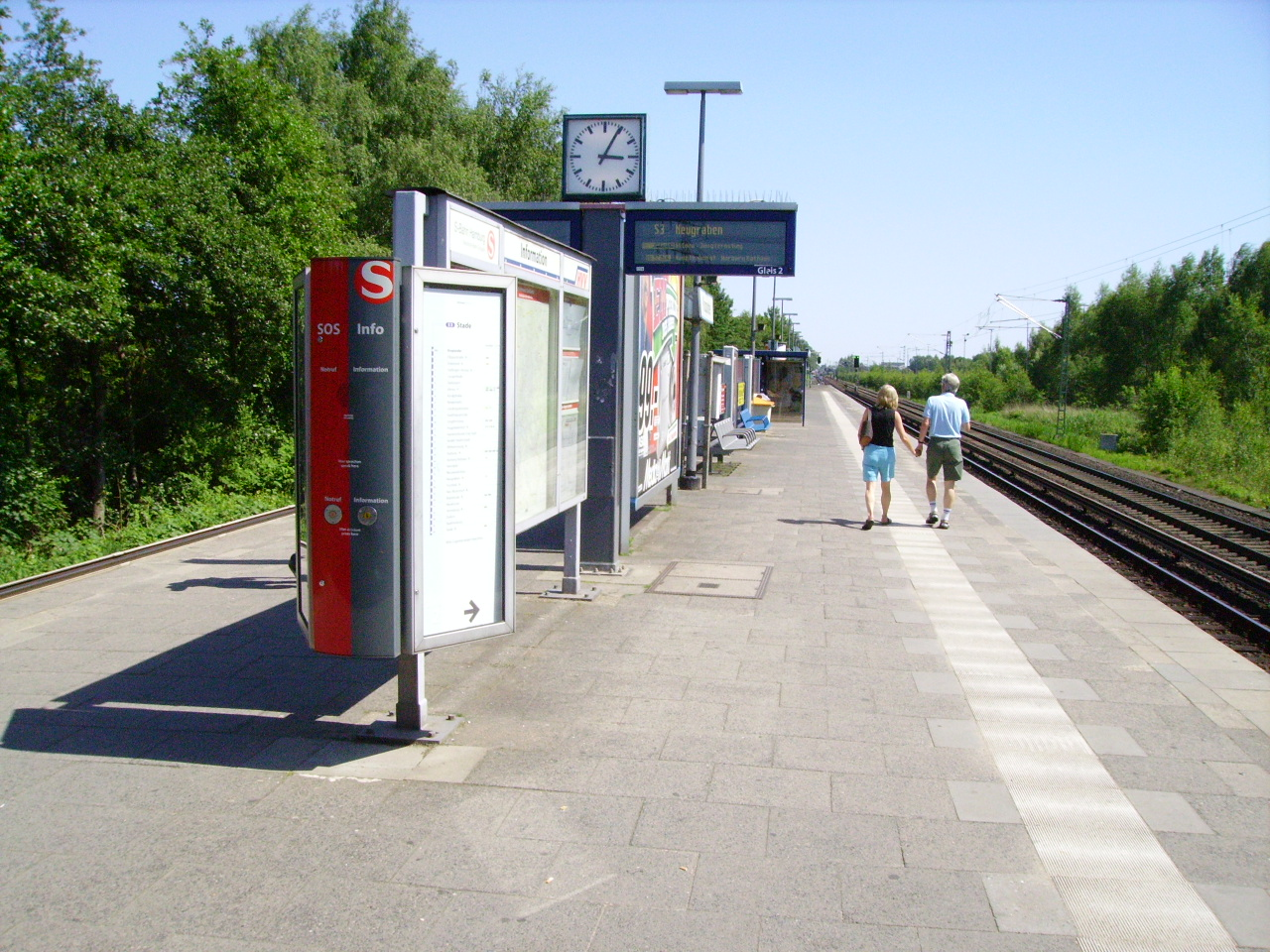
- Krupunder railway station, S-Bahn, platform

General information
- Location: Seestr. 201; 25469 Halstenbek; Germany
- Line: Hamburg S-Bahn S3
- Platforms: 1
- Tracks: 2
- Connections: Buses

Construction
- Structure type: Elevated
- Parking: Park and ride
- Cycle facilities: 25 bicycle stands

Other information
- Station code: ds100: AKRS; DB station code: 3443; Type: Hp; Category: 5
- Fare zone: HVV: A and B/201, 203, and 302

History
- Opened: 22 September 1967; 58 years ago
- Electrified: at opening 1200 V DC system (3rd rail)

Services
Preceding station	Hamburg S-Bahn	Following station
Halstenbek towards Pinneberg	S3	Elbgaustraße towards Hamburg-Neugraben
Location

Krupunder station is on the Hamburg-Altona–Kiel line and is a railway station served by the city trains of the Hamburg S-Bahn. The railway station is located in the municipality Halstenbek in the district of Pinneberg, in Schleswig-Holstein, Germany, directly at the border to Hamburg.

== Station layout ==
The station is an elevated island platform with 2 tracks and one exit. The station is fully accessible for handicapped persons, because since 2014 there is a lift and a special floor layout for blind persons.

== Station services ==
=== Trains ===
The rapid transit trains of the line S3 of the Hamburg S-Bahn are calling the station. Direction of the trains on track 1 is Pinneberg. On track 2 the trains are traveling in the direction Stade via Hamburg central station.

=== Buses ===
Several bus lines are calling a bus stop in front.

=== Facilities at the station ===
A small shop in the station sells fast food and newspapers. There are no lockerboxes. No personnel is attending the station, but there are SOS and information telephones, ticket machines, 30 bicycle stands and 56 park and ride parking lots.

== See also ==
- Hamburger Verkehrsverbund HVV
