= Halstenbek station =

Railway station in Halstenbek, Germany

Coordinates: 53°37′48″N 9°50′21″E

Halstenbek
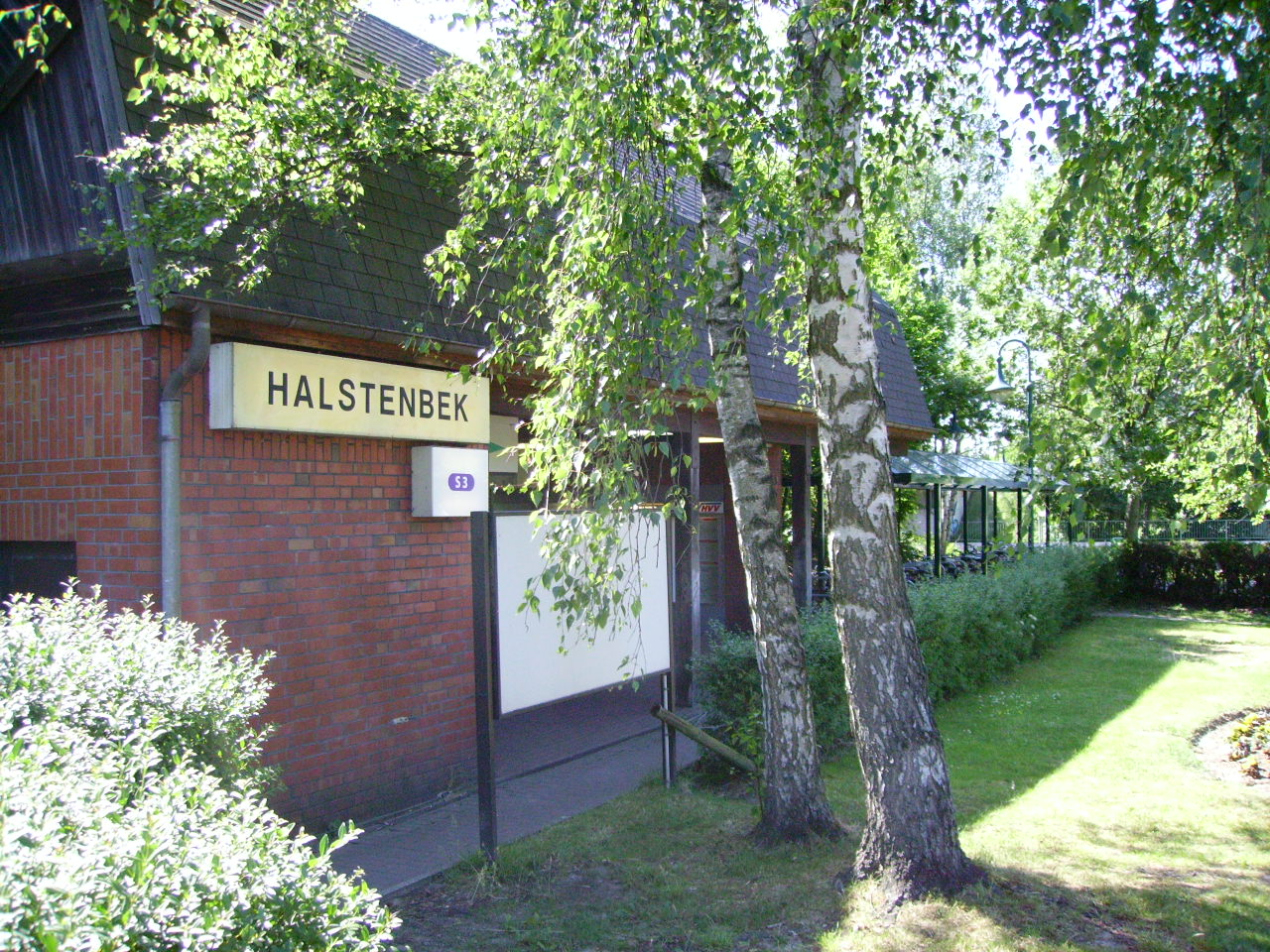
- Halstenbek railway station, entrance Hauptstraße

General information
- Location: Bahnhofstr. 25; 25469 Halstenbek; Germany
- Line: Hamburg S-Bahn S3
- Platforms: 1
- Tracks: 2
- Connections: Bus

Construction
- Structure type: Elevated
- Parking: Park and ride
- Cycle facilities: 105 bicycle stands

Other information
- Station code: ds100: AHKS; DB station code: 2509; Type: Hp; Category: 4
- Fare zone: HVV: B/302 and 402

History
- Opened: 1883; 143 years ago
- Electrified: 22 September 1967; 58 years ago 1200 V DC system (third rail) main line (no stopping) 24 September 1995; 30 years ago (overhead)

Services
Preceding station	Hamburg S-Bahn	Following station
Thesdorf towards Pinneberg	S3	Krupunder towards Hamburg-Neugraben
Location

Halstenbek station is on the Hamburg-Altona–Kiel line and is a railway station served by the city trains of the Hamburg S-Bahn, managed by DB Station&Service for the Hamburg S-Bahn plc, overseen by the Hamburger Verkehrsverbund. The station is located in the municipality Halstenbek in the district of Pinneberg, in Schleswig-Holstein, Germany.

== Station layout ==
The station is an elevated island platform with 2 tracks and two exits. The station is accessible for handicapped persons via a lift at the north (main) entrance. The platforms have a tactile ground indicator system for blind persons.

== Station services ==
=== Trains ===
The station is served by rapid transit trains of the line S3 of the Hamburg S-Bahn. Trains for Pinneberg stop on platform 1. Trains for Stade via Hamburg central station stop on platform 2.

=== Buses ===
There is a bus stop in front of the station.

=== Facilities at the station ===
The station is unstaffed but there are SOS and information telephones, ticket machines, 105 bicycle stands and 100 park and ride parking spaces.

== Gallery ==
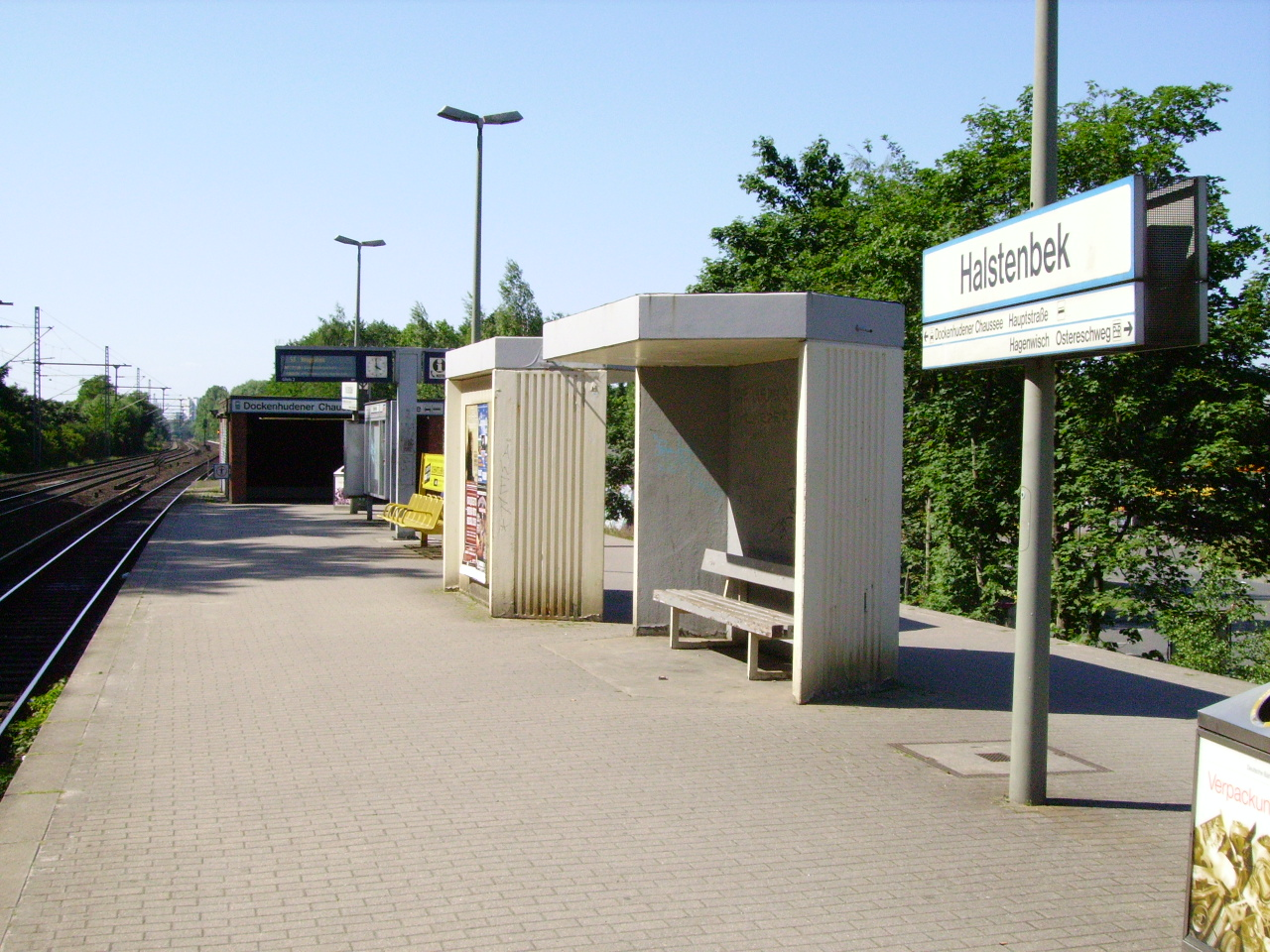
Halstenbek railway station, platform

== See also ==
- Hamburger Verkehrsverbund HVV
