= Halstenbek =

- Municipality
- Flag Coat of arms

- Location of Halstenbek within Pinneberg district
- Interactive map of Halstenbek
- Location within Germany Location within Schleswig-Holstein
- Coordinates: 53°38′N 9°52′E
- Country: Germany
- State: Schleswig-Holstein
- District: Pinneberg
- Subdivisions: 2

Government
  - Mayor: Claudius von Rüden

Area
  - Total: 12.58 km^{2} (4.86 sq mi)
- Elevation: 15 m (49 ft)

Population (2025-12-31)
  - Total: 18,168
  - Density: 1,444/km^{2} (3,740/sq mi)
- Time zone: UTC+01:00 (CET)
  - Summer (DST): UTC+02:00 (CEST)
- Postal codes: 25469
- Dialling codes: 04101
- Vehicle registration: PI
- Website: www.halstenbek.de

Halstenbek town hall

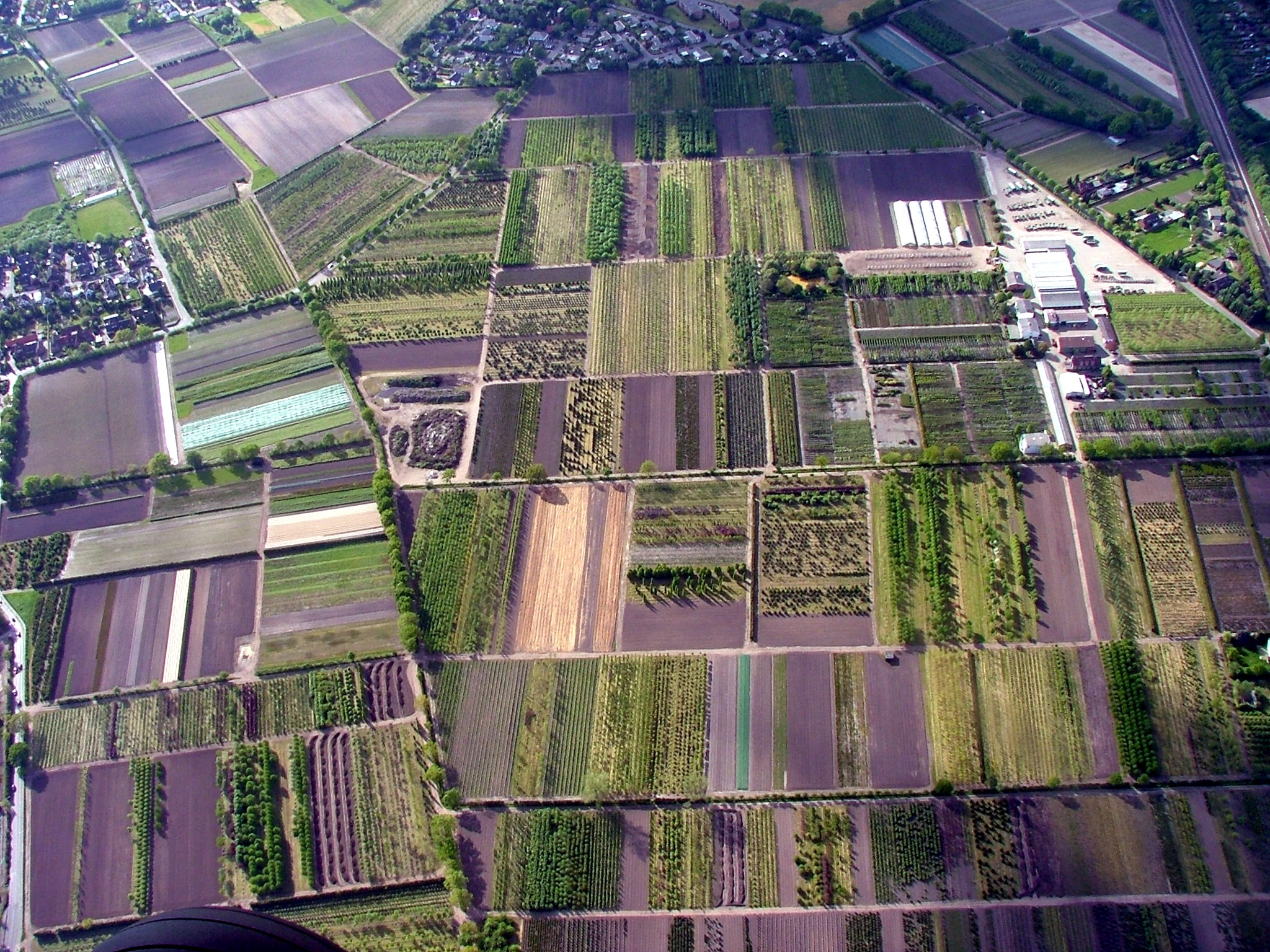
Plant nursery fields

Halstenbek (German pronunciation: [ˈhalstn̩beːk]) is a free municipality in the district of Pinneberg, in Schleswig-Holstein, Germany. It is situated on the north-western border of the city of Hamburg and approximately 5 km southeast of Pinneberg.

== Geography ==
Halstenbek is located in a cultivated heath and bog area. Two small streams the Ballerbek and the Düpenau are crossing the area of Halstenbek, both are sourcing from the small lake Krupunder See.

== History ==
Occasional archaeological finds of flint blades, stone axes and stone core evidences early human presence in the Stone Ages. The earliest secure evidence of settlements has been excavated in the 1920s and 1930s, where cremation cemeteries from the Stone Age, Bronze Age and Iron Ages and some bog iron refining places of the 12th century has been found. The earliest record of Halstenbek dates to 15 May 1296 where a Hamburg citizen was mentioned having borrowed some 30 marks from a man named Hartwicus located in Halstenbeke. At that time Halstenbek has already been a small village. The next written record comes from a 1309 will of Marquard Potekouwe. The form of the name Halstenbeke appears repeatedly in later records. The village of Halstenbek was under the administration of the County of Holstein-Pinneberg which was annexed to Holstein-Glückstadt in 1640, ruled in personal union with the Kingdom of Denmark.

In the course of the Thirty Years' War 1625-1627 Danish soldiers devastated the village. Later Halstenbek suffered from Swedish-Polish Wars 1658-1660 and the War of the Spanish Succession 1701-1714. The Industrial Revolution in the early 19th century starts Halstenbeks revival. After the devastating fire of Hamburg in 1842 the agriculture specialized into plant nursery, as large quantities of trees were required for building houses and planting trees in parks and along the streets.

After Prussia's victory over Denmark in 1864 and the founding of the North German Confederation in 1867 Halstenbek and the district of Pinneberg were under Prussian administration. The direct administration (Drostei) was located in the city of Pinneberg. 1883 Halstenbek received a connection to the railway network with its own freight yard, which promoted the marketing of trees and plants from the Halstenbek plant nurseries substantially. The First World War brought the next big economical break.

During the "Third Reich" the administration of Halstenbek was brought into line. The plant nurseries found new markets such as plantings for green strips of the new Autobahns. During World War II the supply situation in food deteriorated and the plant nurseries switched their production to food crops. But they also continued to deliver plants, but now for camouflage purposes. Soon after beginning of the war four heavy anti-aircraft batteries were stationed at a field near today's Lübzer Straße. Towards the end of the war the railway station of Halstenbek were destroyed by allied bombs. When Hamburg was declared a fortress, the border of the "Fortress Ring" were directly following the border of the villages of Halstenbek and Krupunder. An anti tank ditch was built south of the railway line parallel to today's "Lübzer Straße". North of the railway line the anti tank ditch followed the railway track. The southern anti-tank ditch has been built by male inmates of the concentration camp Neuengamme, the northern ditch were built by Jewish women from the concentration camp outpost of Lurup. After the war, the town fell under British occupation. New administrative structures were set up and houses were built for refugees from eastern German provinces.

In connection with the general reconstruction after the war, the demand for forest plants was increasing steadily and thus one of the major economic factors of the village of Halstenbek was prospering. In the 1970s, the freight railway station was closed. Since the beginning of the 20th century and again since the end of World War II the population of the municipality grew rapidly. The majority of the new residents no longer worked in the village, but in the nearby City of Hamburg. In the 1970s the Autobahn 23 has been built and new industrial areas were set up along the Autobahn. Halstenbek is well known for its so called Wohnmeile ( German for mile of home decoration) a shopping street with lot of furniture shops which is also sometimes derogatory called Möbelmeile (furniture mile).

== Points of interest ==
Halstenbek is the site of the so-called Knick-Ei, a gymnastics arena, the roof of which collapsed twice during construction and which was never completed. The building is nevertheless used in exhibitions as an example of "New German architecture".

== Education ==
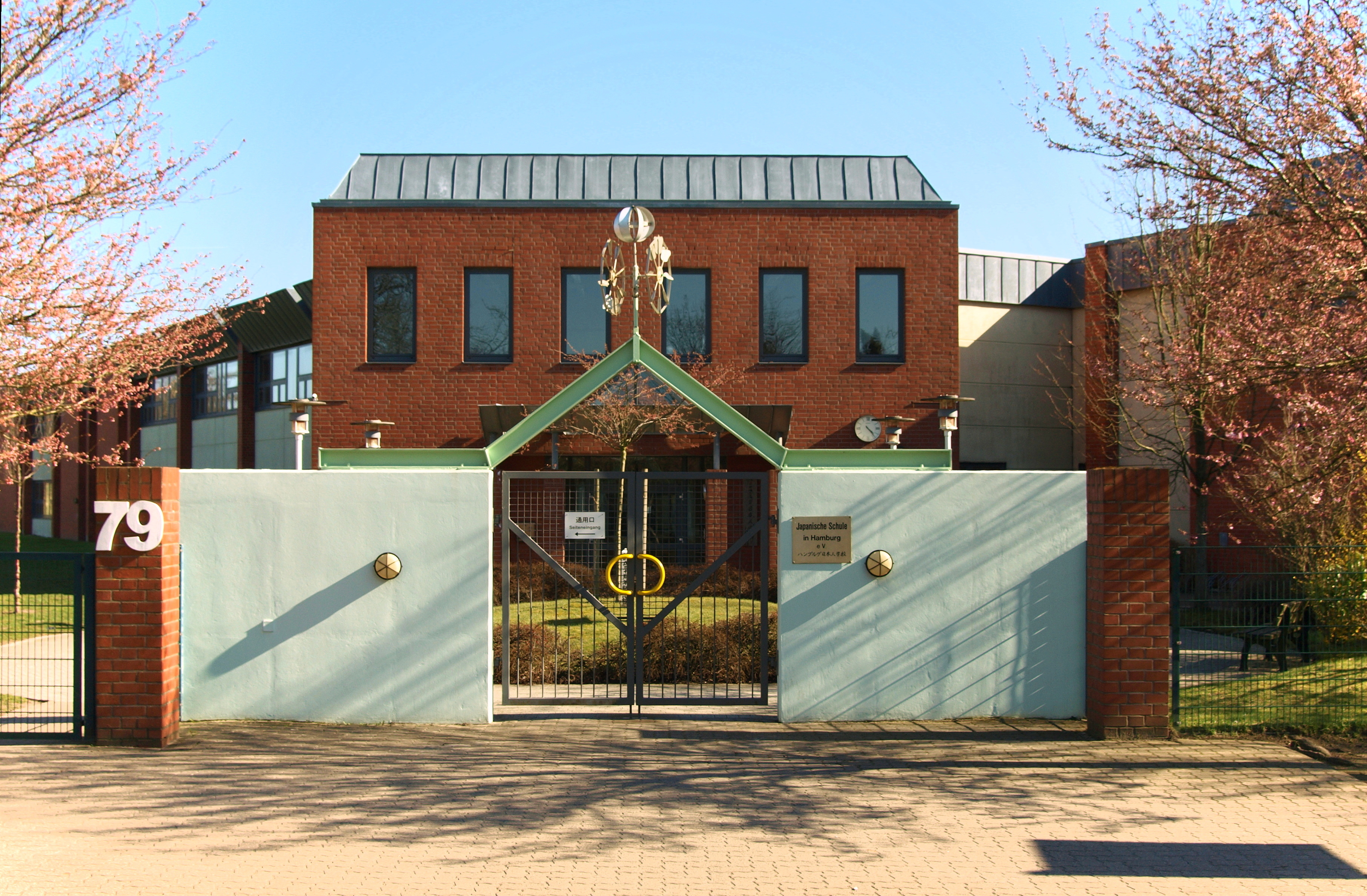
Japanische Schule in Hamburg

Hastenbek hosts six kindergartens, two primary schools Grundschule Bickbargen and Grund- und Gemeinschaftsschule an der Beek, as well as the secondary school Wolfgang-Borchert-Gymnasium. Since 1994 the Japanische Schule in Hamburg, a Japanese international school, is located in Halstenbek. The Japanisches Institut Hamburg (ハンブルグ補習授業校 Hanburugu Hoshū Jugyō Kō), a Japanese weekend educational programme, holds its classes in the Hamburg Japanese school building.

== Transport ==
Halstenbek is connected to the public transport system of Hamburg. The S-Bahn line S3 has the stops Krupunder and Halstenbek, which are both located in Halstenbek.

== Sister cities ==
- Hartkirchen, Upper Austria
- Lübz, Mecklenburg-Vorpommern, Germany

== Notable residents ==
- Gerd Dose (1942–2010), professor of English literature
- Marlon Krause (born 1990), football player
- Reinhard Suhren (1916–1984), U-Boat-Commander, died in Halstenbek
- Martin Vandreier (born 1974), musician with the German band 'Fettes Brot', lived in Halstenbek
