= Puttgarden station =

Railway station in Fehmarn, Germany

Puttgarden
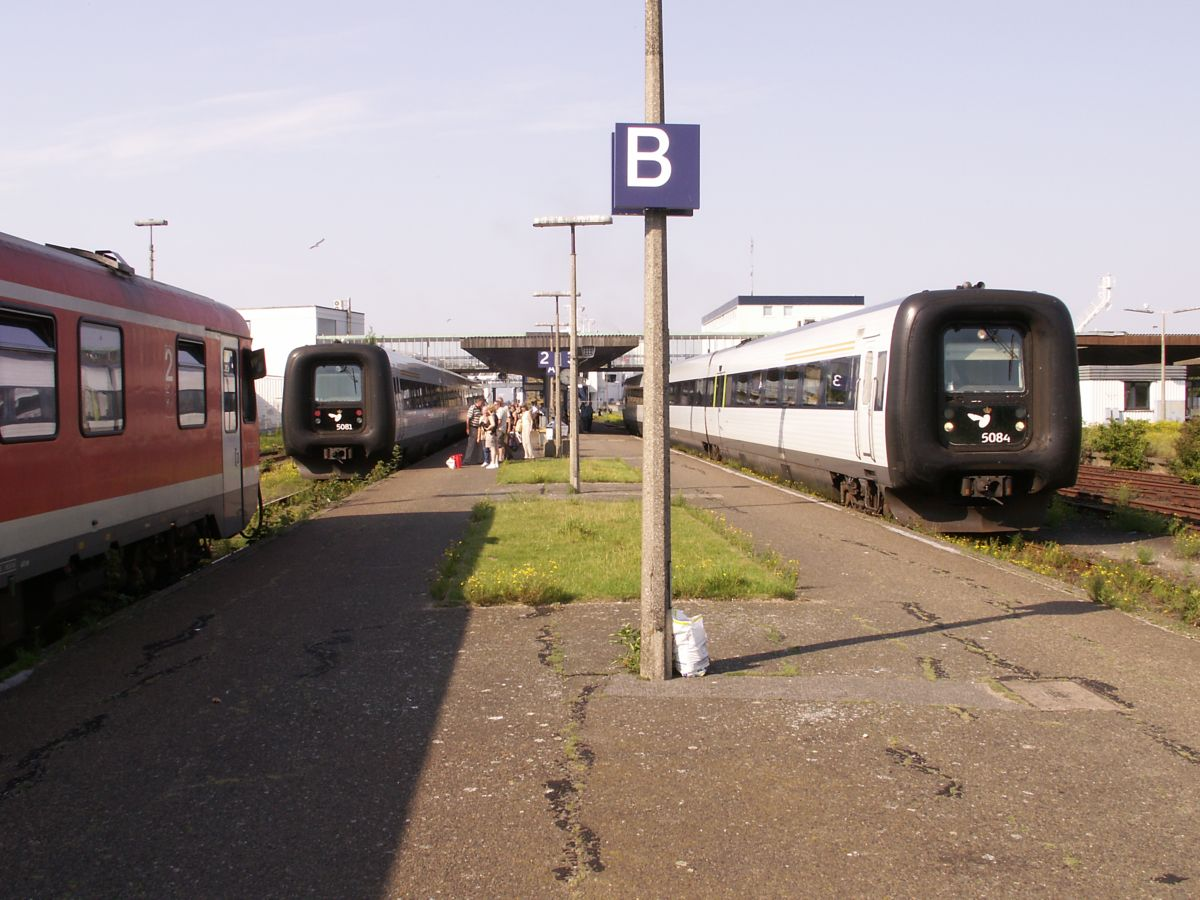

General information
- Location: Puttgarden, Schleswig-Holstein; Germany
- Coordinates: 54°30′6″N 11°13′27″E
- Elevation: 5 m (16 ft)
- Owner: Deutsche Bahn
- Operator: DB Station&Service
- Lines: Lübeck–Puttgarden railway (KBS 141)
- Platforms: 6, in 2022 only 2 in operation
- Connections: Bus interchange

Other information
- Station code: 5063
- DS100 code: APU
- IBNR: 8000079
- Category: 6
- Website: www.bahnhof.de

History
- Opened: 14 May 1963
- Closed: 30 August 2022
Location

Puttgarden station was a railway station at the major ferry terminal on the Vogelfluglinie (bird flight line) on the island of Fehmarn in the German state of Schleswig-Holstein. It lies between the town of Puttgarden and Marienleuchte.

All rail traffic was discontinued on 31 August 2022. Until 2019, it primarily served the needs of international long distance traffic between Hamburg and Copenhagen, and in 2020-2022 regional traffic to Lübeck. Rail traffic is expected to restart in 2029, but not have stops for passengers in Puttgarden.

== Operation and history ==
In 1961, a large ferry terminal was built in Puttgarden and in 1963 it was put into operation together with the Fehmarn Sound Bridge, because the traditional ferry from Germany to Denmark between Rostock-Warnemünde and Gedser was at the time beyond the Iron Curtain, and the replacement route from Großenbrode Quay to Gedser was too time consuming.

The ferry terminal was opened on 14 May 1963 by the Danish King Frederik IX and German President Heinrich Lübke. The station was very important from the beginning, since a large proportion of rail freight and passenger traffic was shipped to and from Scandinavia via Puttgarden. This is shown by the large and, since the end of freight traffic on the bird flight line, almost completely idle network of rail tracks.

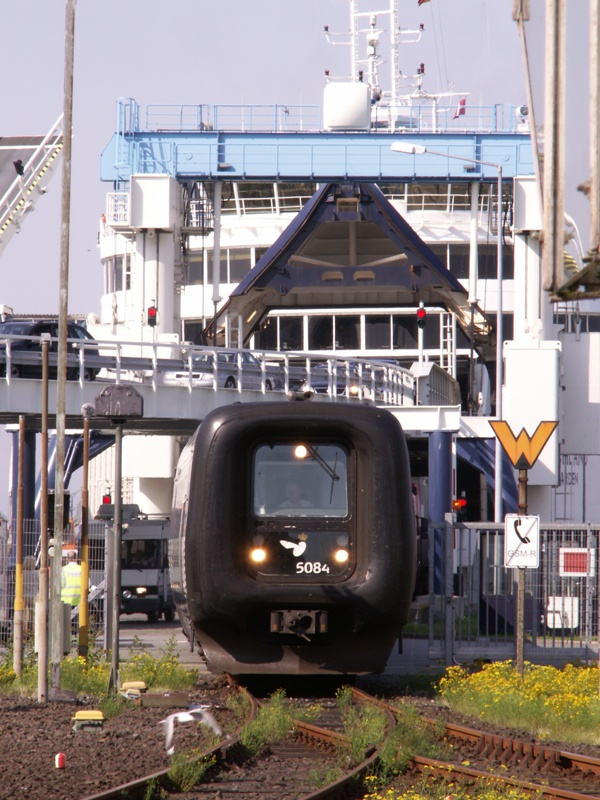
A EuroCity leaving ferry.

After the completion of the bridge over the Great Belt in Denmark in 1998, most trains run for financial reasons over a lengthy detour by that route because of the limited track capacity of the roll-on/roll-off ships and to avoid the associated shunting. Freight through the rail yards at Puttgarden was initially partially closed and then closed completely. Simultaneously with the closing of freight traffic in the period from 1996 to 1998, the ferry terminal was modernised by the shipping company Scandlines.

In 2007, the station was completely modernised, including the provision of level access even to the unused platforms along with glass, automatic exit doors and modern toilet facilities with toilets for the disabled. The final stage of this work was the reconstruction of the platform, significantly shortening and slightly raising the platform, and the equipping of the station with a modern lighting and sound system.

The former locomotive-hauled EuroCity service from Hamburg to Copenhagen were replaced in the 1990s by a three-carriage Danish IC3 multiple unit, which can be coupled and uncoupled without any shunting. Since December 2007, some of the IC3 services have been replaced by German Intercity-Express services operated by class 605 (ICE-TD) diesel multiple units, together providing several services each day on the Copenhagen–Hamburg route. One pair runs to/from Berlin.

In August 2010, the Burg auf Fehmarn station was reactivated, and is now called Fehmarn-Burg station. Until December 2010, some services of Intercity line 31 to/from Frankfurt began and ended in Puttgarden. These now start or finish at Fehmarn-Burg.

Beginning August 31, 2022, all rail traffic between Neustadt and Puttgarden was suspended due to construction work on the double-track railway line connecting to the Fehmarn Belt Fixed Link (currently forecast in 2028) until its completion. Because of this all rail traffic at Puttgarden station ceased at this date and is replaced by a bus service. It is not expected that trains will stop at Puttgarden when the Fehmarn Belt Fixed Link is in traffic since the ferry traffic is expected to close and the village Puttgarden has small population.

== Infrastructure ==
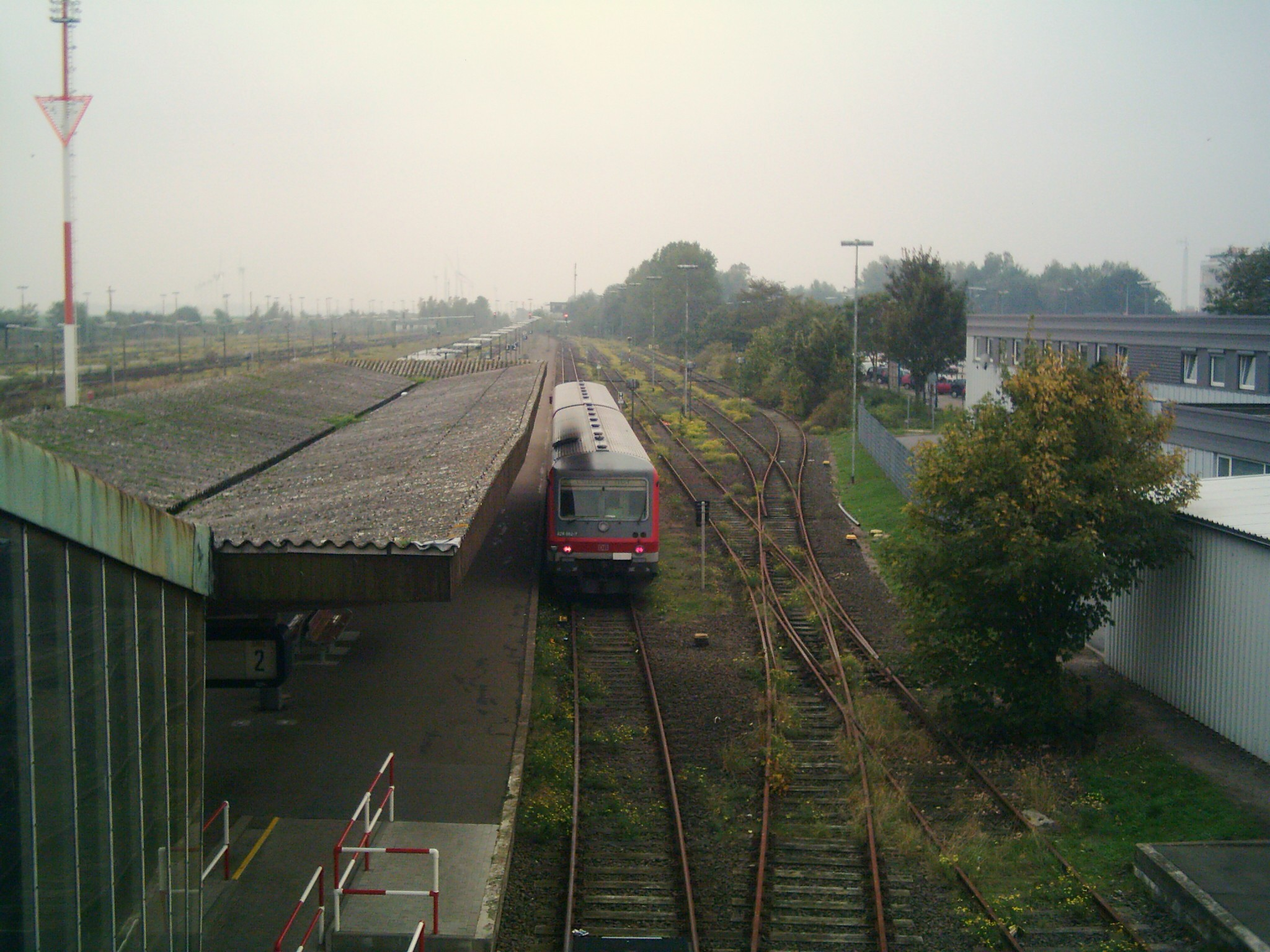
Track field looking towards Burg with Regionalbahn operated by class 628

The station had a total of 22 kilometres of track and 145 turnouts. Only two platform tracks were in service in the end.

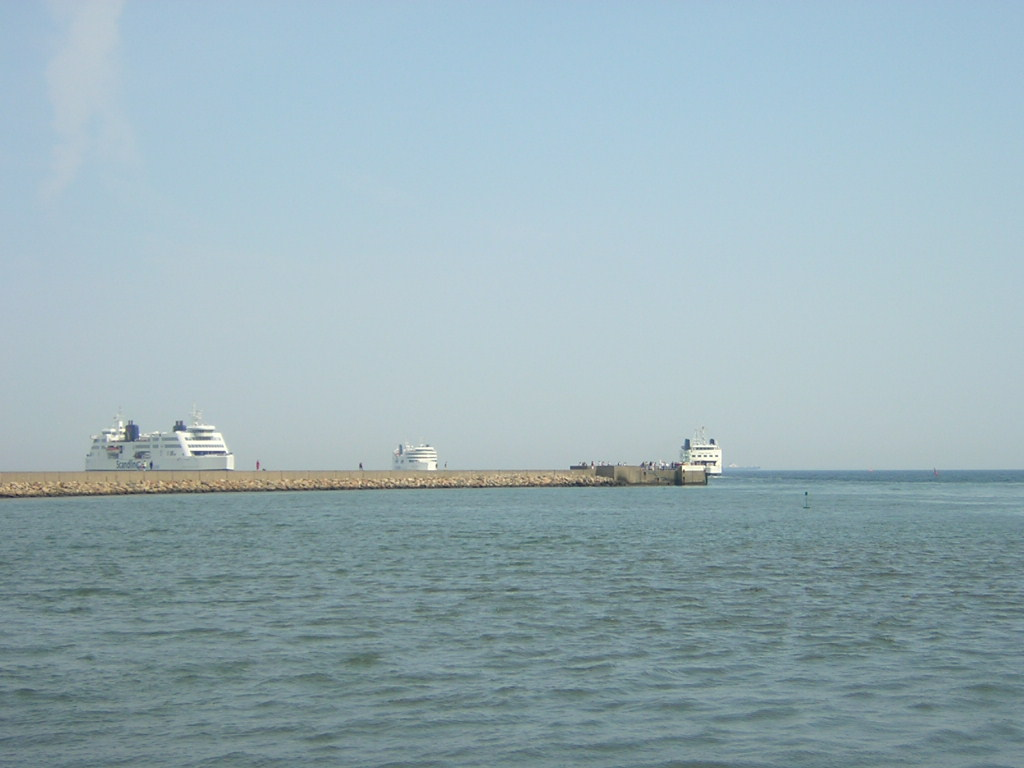
Outside the port area

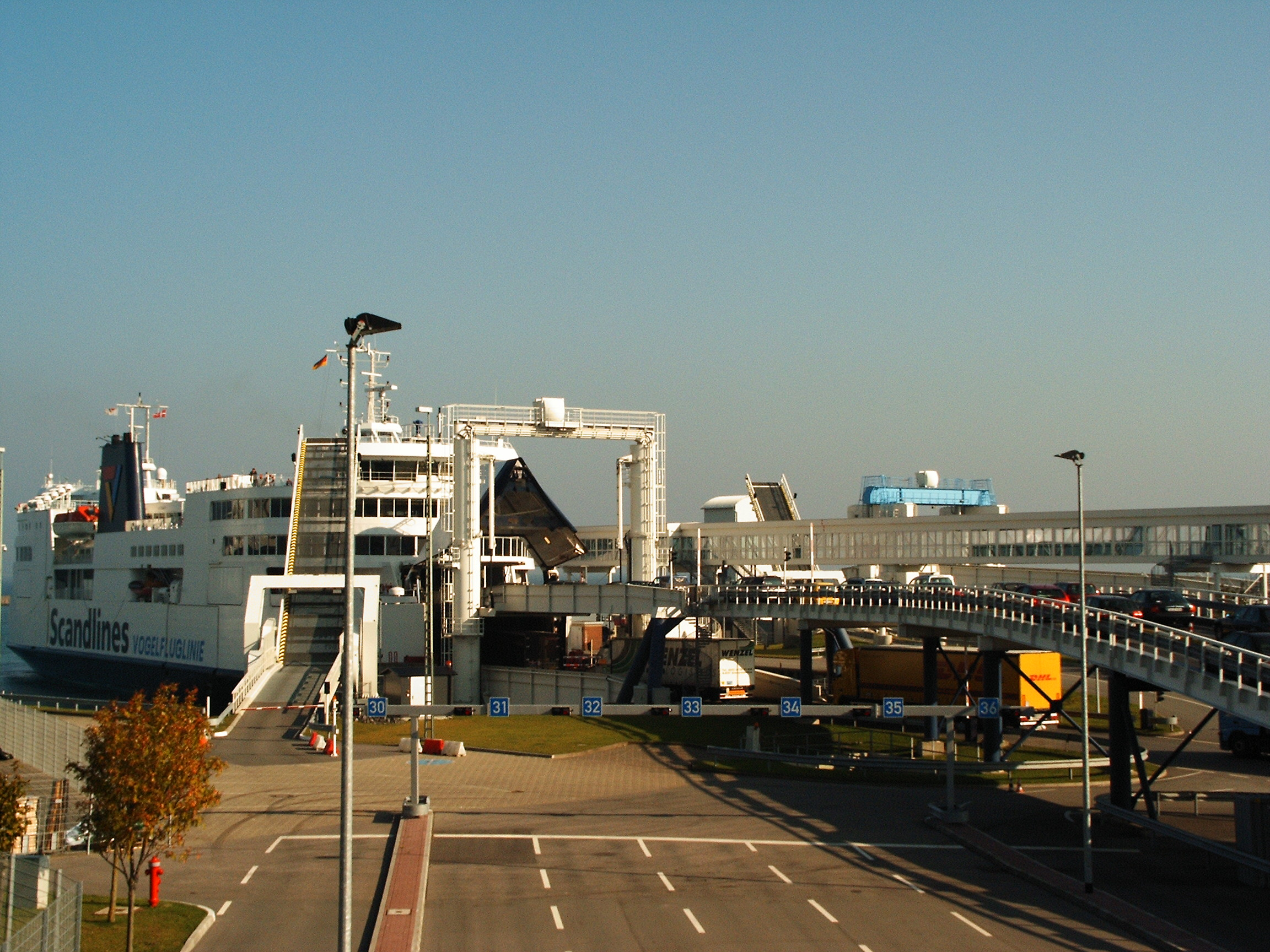
Ferry in port

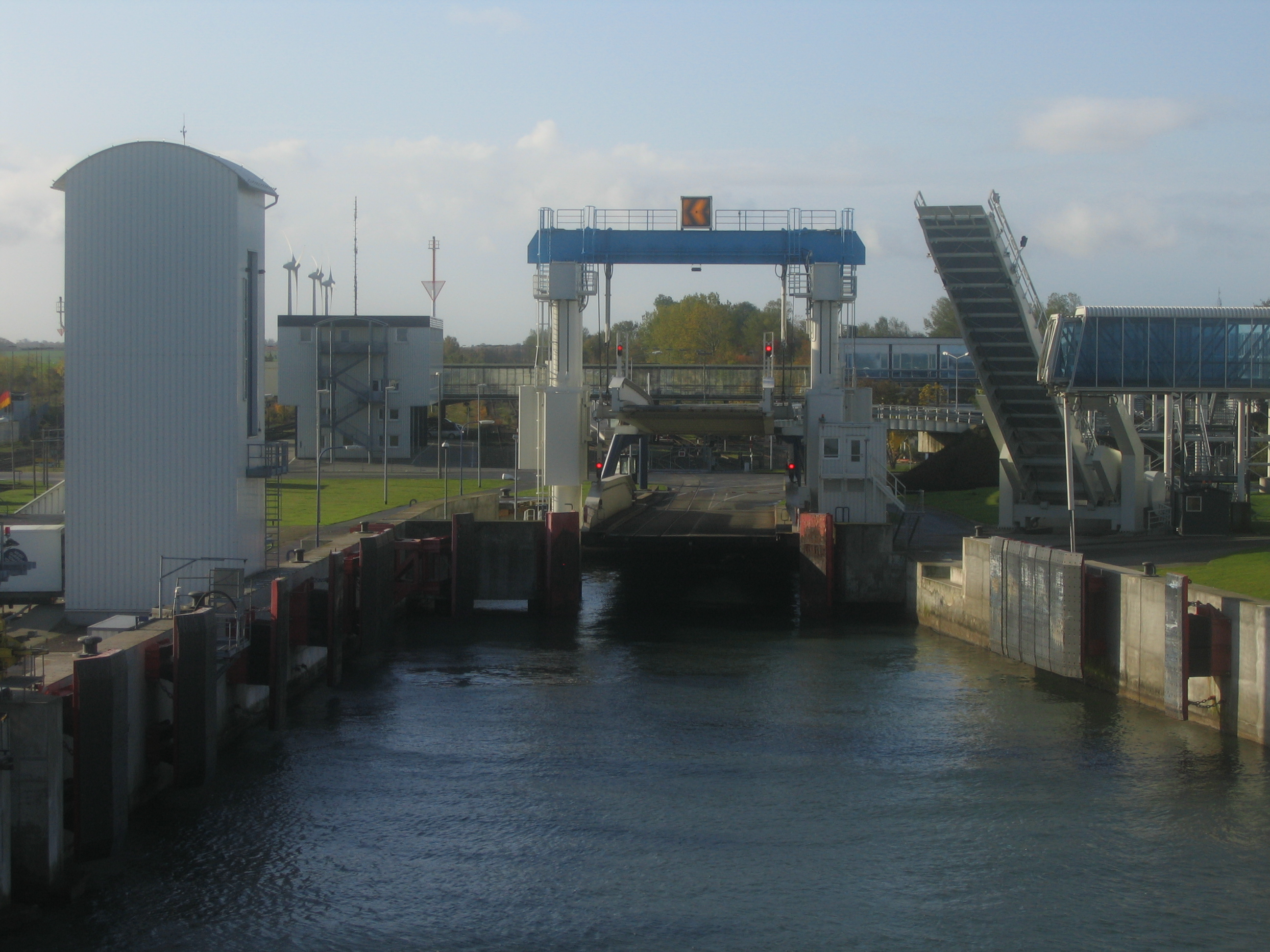
Entrance to the harbour

The port next to the station area has four docks, two of them with ramps allowing passengers to board and disembark. Only the basin adjoining track 2 and 3 is still used to operate trains and rail wagons on and off the train ferry. The Deutsche Ferienroute Alpen-Ostsee (German Alpine–Baltic Holiday Route) ends in Puttgarden after 1738 kilometres.

From the ferry terminal, there are several bus services operated by Autokraft, including to Burg auf Fehmarn.

== Operations ==
There was until 2022 the regional line RB 85 Lübeck – Timmendorferstrand – Oldenburg (Holst) – Fehmarn-Burg – Puttgarden going every two hours.

Until 2019 there were trains Hamburg – Lübeck – Vordingborg – Copenhagen, which used the ferry Puttgarden – Rødby. All trains were diesel powered due to lack of electricification.
