= Fehmarn-Burg station =

Railway station in Fehmarn, Germany

Fehmarn-Burg
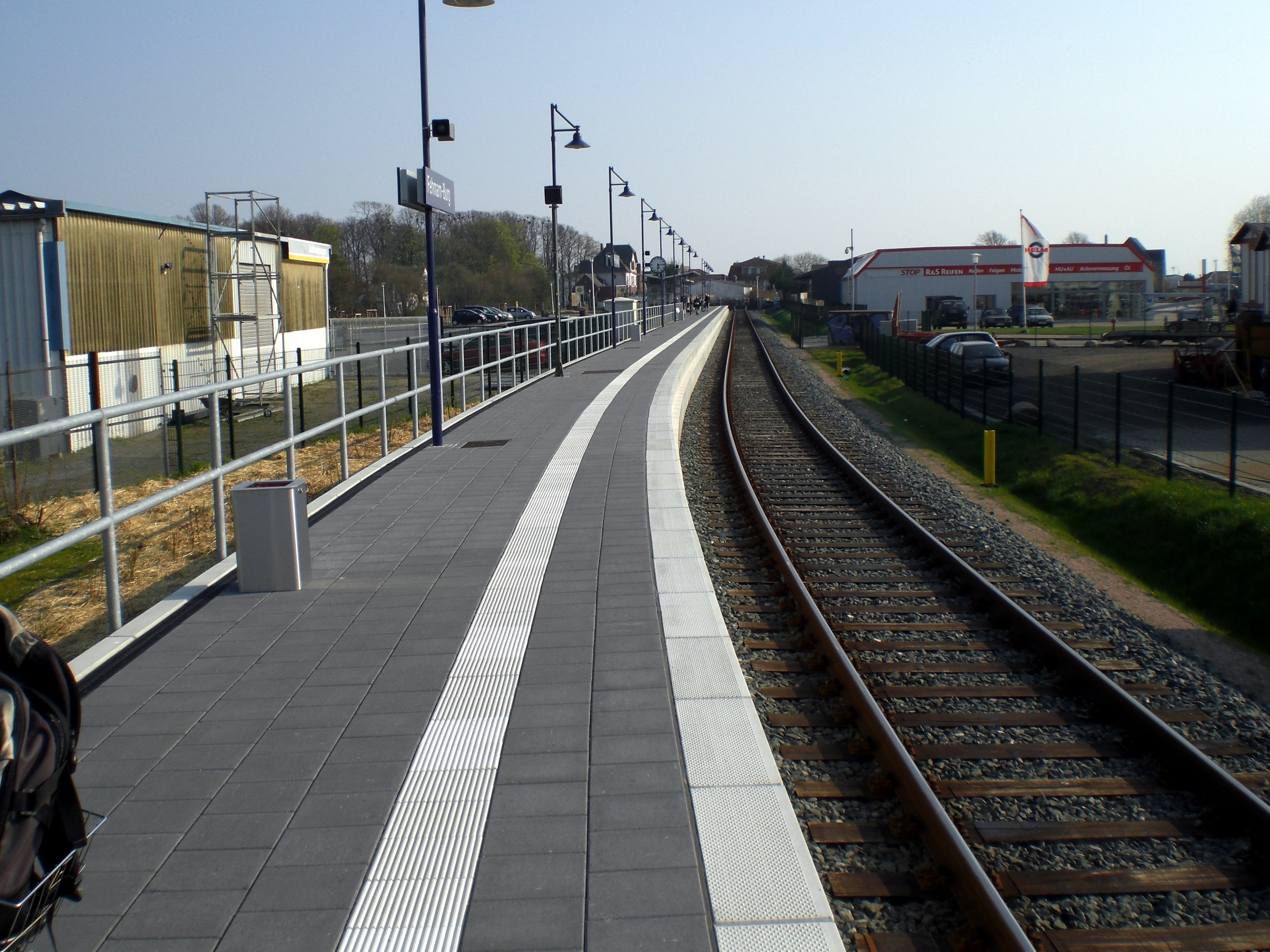
- 2011

General information
- Location: Am Steinkamp; 23769 Burg auf Fehmarn; Schleswig-Holstein; Germany
- Coordinates: 54.4436°N 11.1891°E
- Owner: AKN Eisenbahn
- Operator: AKN Eisenbahn
- Lines: Lübeck–Puttgarden railway (KBS 140)
- Platforms: 1 side platform
- Tracks: 1

Construction
- Parking: yes
- Cycle facilities: yes
- Accessible: yes

Other information
- Station code: -
- DS100 code: ABUF
- IBNR: 8001274
- Category: -
- Fare zone: NAH.SH

History
- Opened: 31 July 2010; 16 years ago
Location

Fehmarn-Burg station (German: Bahnhof Fehmarn-Burg) is a railway station in the municipality of Burg auf Fehmarn, located in the Ostholstein district in Schleswig-Holstein, Germany.

Beginning August 31, 2022, all rail traffic between Neustadt and Puttgarden, including at Fehmarn-Burg station, is suspended due to construction work on the double-track railway line connecting to the Fehmarn Belt Fixed Link. The traffic is replaced by a bus service. It is expected that regional trains will go to Fehmarn-Burg again when the railway is rebuilt and in traffic again, around 2029, then as end point of the line.
