= Großensee =

- Municipality
- Coat of arms

- Location of Großensee within Stormarn district
- Interactive map of Großensee
- Location within Germany Location within Schleswig-Holstein
- Coordinates: 53°36′47″N 10°20′29″E
- Country: Germany
- State: Schleswig-Holstein
- District: Stormarn
- Municipal assoc.: Trittau

Government
  - Mayor: Karsten Lindemann-Eggers

Area
  - Total: 12.1 km^{2} (4.7 sq mi)
- Elevation: 46 m (151 ft)

Population (2025-12-31)
  - Total: 1,862
  - Density: 154/km^{2} (399/sq mi)
- Time zone: UTC+01:00 (CET)
  - Summer (DST): UTC+02:00 (CEST)
- Postal codes: 22946
- Dialling codes: 04154
- Vehicle registration: OD
- Website: www.grossensee.eu

Großensee (German pronunciation: [ˈɡʁoːsn̩ˌzeː], lit. 'Big Lake'; Low German: Grotensee) is a municipality in the district of Stormarn, in Schleswig-Holstein, Germany. The population estimate of 2021 is 1,821 residents. The town is named after the lake of the same name.

== History ==
Großensee was first mentioned as a municipality in 1248. After the annexation of Schleswig-Holstein by Prussia, Großensee became part of the newly founded Stormarn district and, with the introduction of the Prussian municipal constitution in 1889, became part of the Siek administrative district.

At the end of World War II, Germany was gradually occupied. By the end of the war, numerous refugees and displaced persons from the eastern territories of the German Reich had fled to Schleswig-Holstein. As a result, Großensee's population doubled.

== Culture ==
The list of cultural monuments in Großensee includes the cultural monuments registered in the state of Schleswig-Holstein's list of monuments.

=== Green Spaces and Local Recreation ===
On the southern shore of the lake of the same name lies a natural beach outdoor swimming pool with a DLRG (German Rescue Service) station. A campsite is located in the immediate vicinity with direct access to the pool.

=== Sports ===
There are various cultural and sports clubs: the AWO (African Women's Workers' Union) Großensee, the Großensee Local Recreation and Cultural Association from 1966, the Großensee Senior Citizens' Union, the Großensee Games and Sports Club from 1952, the Sieker Berg–Großensee Riding and Driving Club, the Stormarnsche Schweiz Riding and Driving Club, the Großensee Tennis Club from 1971, the Großensee Golf Club, the Stormarnsche Schweiz Fanfare Band, the Großensee Settlers' Association, the Großensee Volunteer Fire Department, and others.
