= Hamburg-Altona–Kiel railway =

Railway line in Schleswig-Holstein, Germany

Hamburg-Altona–Kiel
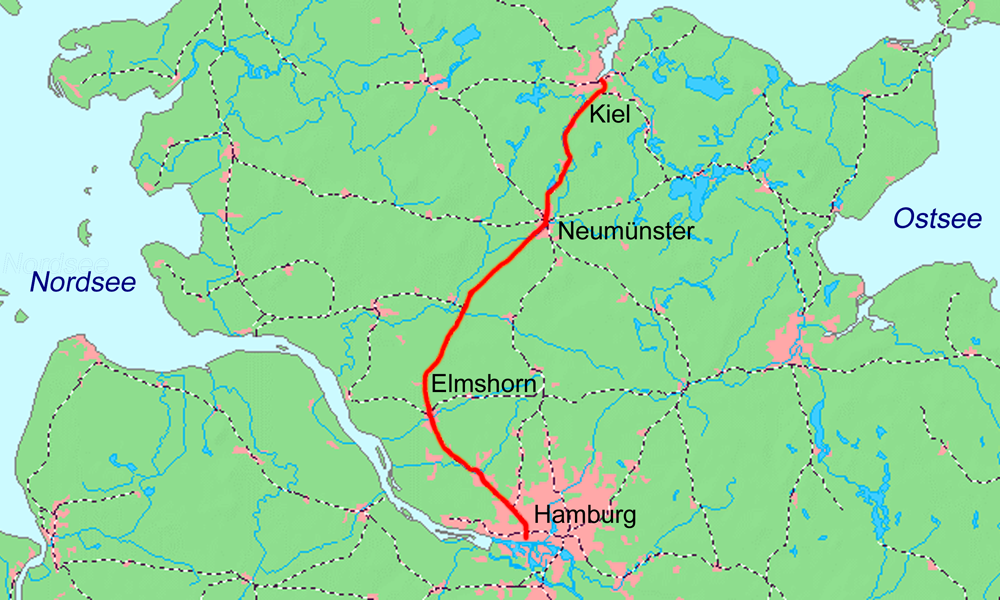

Overview
- Line number: 1220
- Locale: Schleswig-Holstein, Germany

Service
- Route number: 131

Technical
- Line length: 104.877 km (65.168 mi)
- Number of tracks: 2 throughout
- Track gauge: 1,435 mm (4 ft 8 1/2 in) standard gauge
- Electrification: Altona–Kiel:15 kV/16.7 Hz AC overhead catenary; Hamburg–Pinneberg:1200 V DC third rail
- Operating speed: 160 km/h (99.4 mph) (maximum)

The Hamburg-Altona–Kiel railway (historic name: The King Christian VIII Baltic Railway (Note: German: König Christian VIII. Ostseebahn, Danish: Kong Christian VIIIs Østersø Jernbane)) is one of the most important main line railways of the states of Schleswig-Holstein and Hamburg in Northern Germany. The line runs through the region of Holstein and connects the cities of Hamburg, Elmshorn, Neumünster and Kiel. The 105 km (65 mi) long standard gauge double track electrified railway line is now owned by DB InfraGO.

The railway line opened in 1844 to connect the cities of Altona and Kiel, at the time the two largest cities in the Duchy of Holstein then under Danish rule. It is the oldest railway line in the current state of Schleswig-Holstein, one of the first railways in Germany, and the first to reach the Baltic Sea. When it opened, it was also the first railway in Denmark and its dependencies. (Note: The first railway line in the Kingdom of Denmark proper, was the Copenhagen–Roskilde railway line from Copenhagen to Roskilde on the island of Zealand which was completed three years later in 1847.)

== Route ==
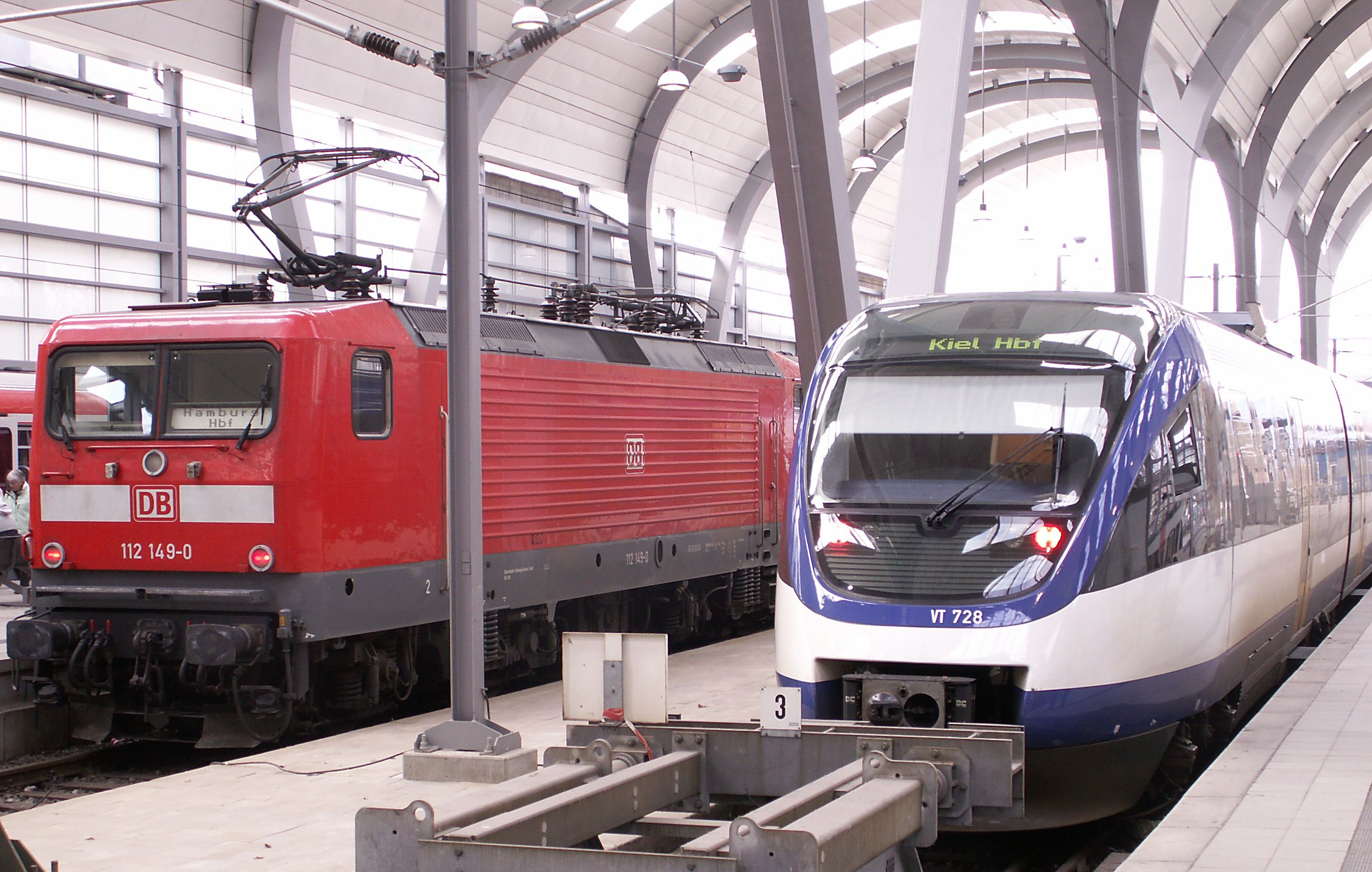
Kiel station

The distance measuring starts at the line's original terminus in Altona, of which the station building is now the town hall of the urban borough of Altona. However, today the route begins at the terminal station of Hamburg-Altona, which was built a few hundred meters to the north of the old station in 1898. From there the line runs north, parallel to the route of Hamburg S-Bahn lines S3 and S21.

The first stop on the main line is Pinneberg, which provides interchange with the S-Bahn. The Marsh Railway to the North Sea coast and the line to Henstedt-Ulzburg branch from Elmshorn.

Further north in Neumünster the line connects to Flensburg, to Heide and Büsum and to Bad Oldesloe. Freight and express trains to Scandinavia do not continue towards Kiel, but instead run on the continuously electrified line from Neumünster to the Danish border at Flensburg. Regional services run from Kiel to Lübeck and to Flensburg.

== History ==
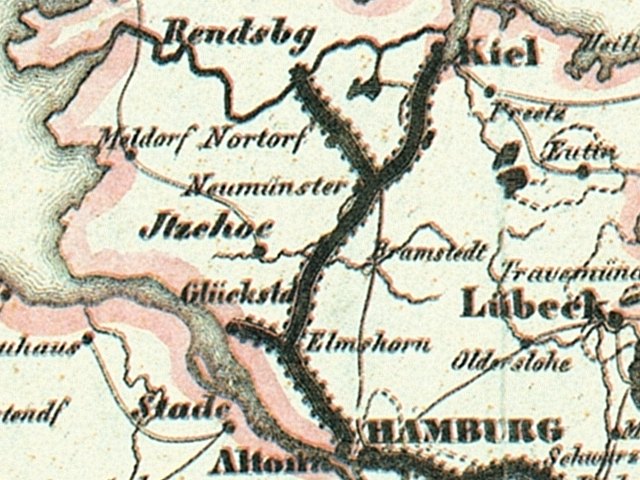
The Hamburg-Altona–Kiel railway line with branch lines from Elmshorn to Glückstadt) and from Neumünster to Rendsburg in 1849

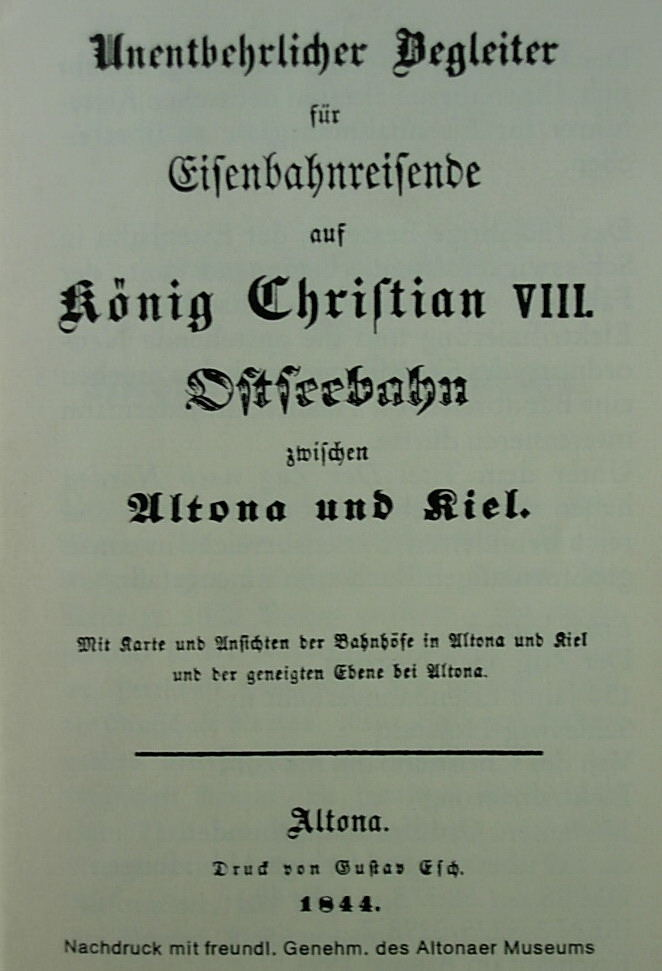
Cover of "Essential companion for travelers on the King Christian VIII Baltic Railway between Altona and Kiel", published 1844

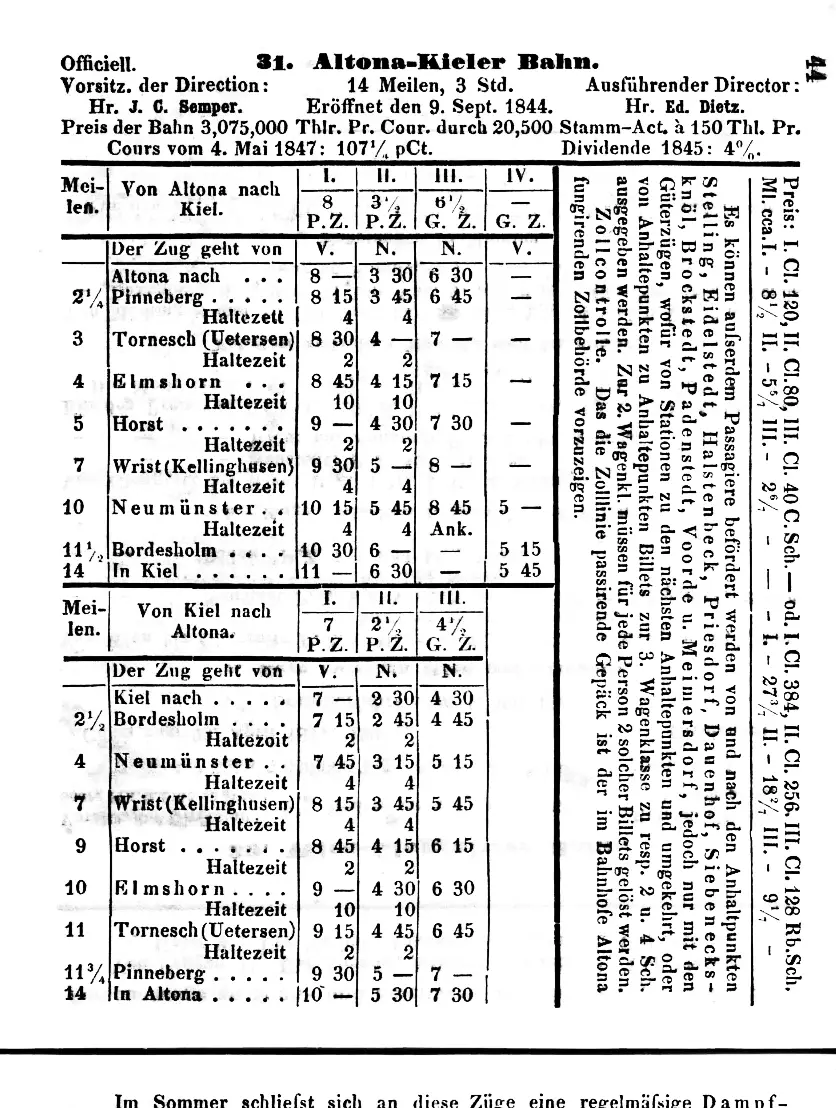
1847 timetable

The line was built by the Altona-Kiel Railway Company (Altona-Kieler Eisenbahn-Gesellschaft, AKE). Construction commenced in 1842 and was completed in 1844. The line opened on King Christian VIII's birthday, the 18 September 1844. The railway was operated by the AKE until the company's operations were taken over by the Prussian state railways in 1884. Following successive takeovers by Deutsche Reichsbahn, Deutsche Bundesbahn, and DB Netz AG, the line is now owned by DB InfraGO AG.

According to the timetable, from 3 July 1944 onwards there were 7–10 daily connections between Kiel and Hamburg and 8–10 between Hamburg and Kiel, with journey times between 1 hour 50 minutes (stops only in Elmshorn, Wrist, and Neumünster) and 2 hours 48 minutes (16 intermediate stops).

On 24 September 1995, the electrification of the 109-kilometer line was put into operation. Passengers could now travel from Hamburg Hauptbahnhof to Kiel in 76 minutes without changing trains, a journey that previously required 100 minutes and a change. Hamburg-Altona station was replaced by Hamburg Central Station as the starting point for all regularly scheduled passenger trains to Kiel. For the first time, Kiel was served by ICE trains with two daily round trips, with a journey time of 61 minutes. Electrification of this railway line had already been planned before the First World War. The project did not come to fruition because the army administration strictly opposed it for all lines important for troop deployments or located near national borders.

Since the timetable change on 9 December 2012, trains with a maximum length of 835 m (2,740 ft) can operate on the line between Maschen and Padborg, following prior coordination among all operating stations; previously, only trains up to 740 m (2,430 ft) long were permitted.

== Prospects ==
The section of track between Neumünster and Hamburg is to be equipped with ETCS by 2025. As much of the track as possible is to be equipped with ETCS Level 2.

== Current operations ==
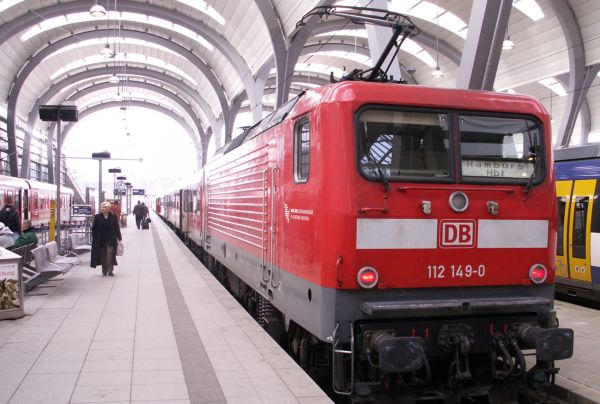
DB 112 149 in Kiel Hauptbahnhof

Freight traffic, long-distance traffic (ICE/IC/EC) and local traffic operate along the entire route.

=== Regional traffic ===
From 14 December 2008, the proportion of Regional Express trains with double-decker carriages was increased. Today, all RE trains use double-decker carriages.

On 4 April 2009, DB Regio took operations of the Kiel–Neumünster regional service back from Nord-Ostsee-Bahn (NOB), in exchange for the passenger services on the Kiel–Eckernförde section. DB Regio operated the service with class 648 multiple units again, which was intended to rationalise rolling stock circulation. The Regionalbahn Kiel / Neumünster service, which is run as RB 77, is operated with a class 112 or 143 electric locomotive and a five-car SHE set, consisting of a 1st class carriage, three 2nd class carriages and a control car.

The transport contracts for the central network run from December 2014 to December 2027.

Lot A, initially consisting of lines RE 7 Flensburg–Hamburg, RE 70 Kiel–Hamburg, and RB 77 Kiel–Neumünster, was awarded to DB Regio. Since the timetable change in December 2017, the locomotive-hauled trains on lines RE 7 and RE 70 have been gradually replaced by four-car double-decker electric multiple units of the Bombardier Twindexx Vario (class 445). The former regional train line RB 77 was integrated as a branch of line RE 7, which now operates between Hamburg and Neumünster with one train portion running to /from both Flensburg and Kiel. In Neumünster, the train is split, for which the station was specially upgraded with a signaling system designed for portion working. Since then, lines RE 7 and RE 70 have offered a direct half-hourly service between Hamburg and Kiel.

Lot B consists of lines RB 61 Itzehoe–Hamburg and RB 71 Wrist–/Itzehoe–Elmshorn–Hamburg-Altona and was awarded to Nordbahn Eisenbahngesellschaft. Stadler FLIRT multiple units operate hourly on both lines, and additional services are offered between Elmshorn and Pinneberg during peak hours. A new turning track was built in Wrist to allow RB 71 trains to run to Wrist. Since December 2025, RB 71 trains have run to Hamburg Hbf instead of Hamburg-Altona. At the same time, the RB 60 supplementary line was introduced. Several services are offered during peak hours between Hamburg-Altona and Itzehoe, with additional services operating only on a section of the line.

In mid-2024, the Nahverkehrsverbund Schleswig-Holstein (Schleswig-Holstein Public Transport Association, NAH.SH) issued a tender for the operation of lines RE 7 and RE 70 for the period beginning in December 2027. In April 2025, it was announced that no acceptable bids had been received. Therefore, the tendering process was to be restarted with adjusted requirements. The transport contract for lines RB 61 and RB 71 for the period after 2027 was again awarded to Nordbahn in May 2025.

=== Long-distance transport ===
Long-distance services between Hamburg and Kiel include ICE 1 and ICE 4 trains, as well as IC and EC trains, hauled by DB Class 101 or ČD Vectron (class 193) electric locomotives and consisting of eight to eleven carriages. Most trains between Hamburg and Kiel also stop in Neumünster. In 2020, five (seven during the summer) Danish IC3 trains ran daily in each direction between Hamburg and Flensburg on the Hamburg – Fredericia – Aarhus and Copenhagen route. Due to track conflicts, trains to/from Aarhus do not stop in Neumünster and Schleswig, but do stop in Rendsburg. Trains to/from Copenhagen do not stop between Flensburg and Hamburg Hauptbahnhof, with the exception of a night train pair, which only runs during the summer and also stops in Neumünster and Kiel.
