= Friedrichsruh station =

Railway station in Germany

Friedrichsruh
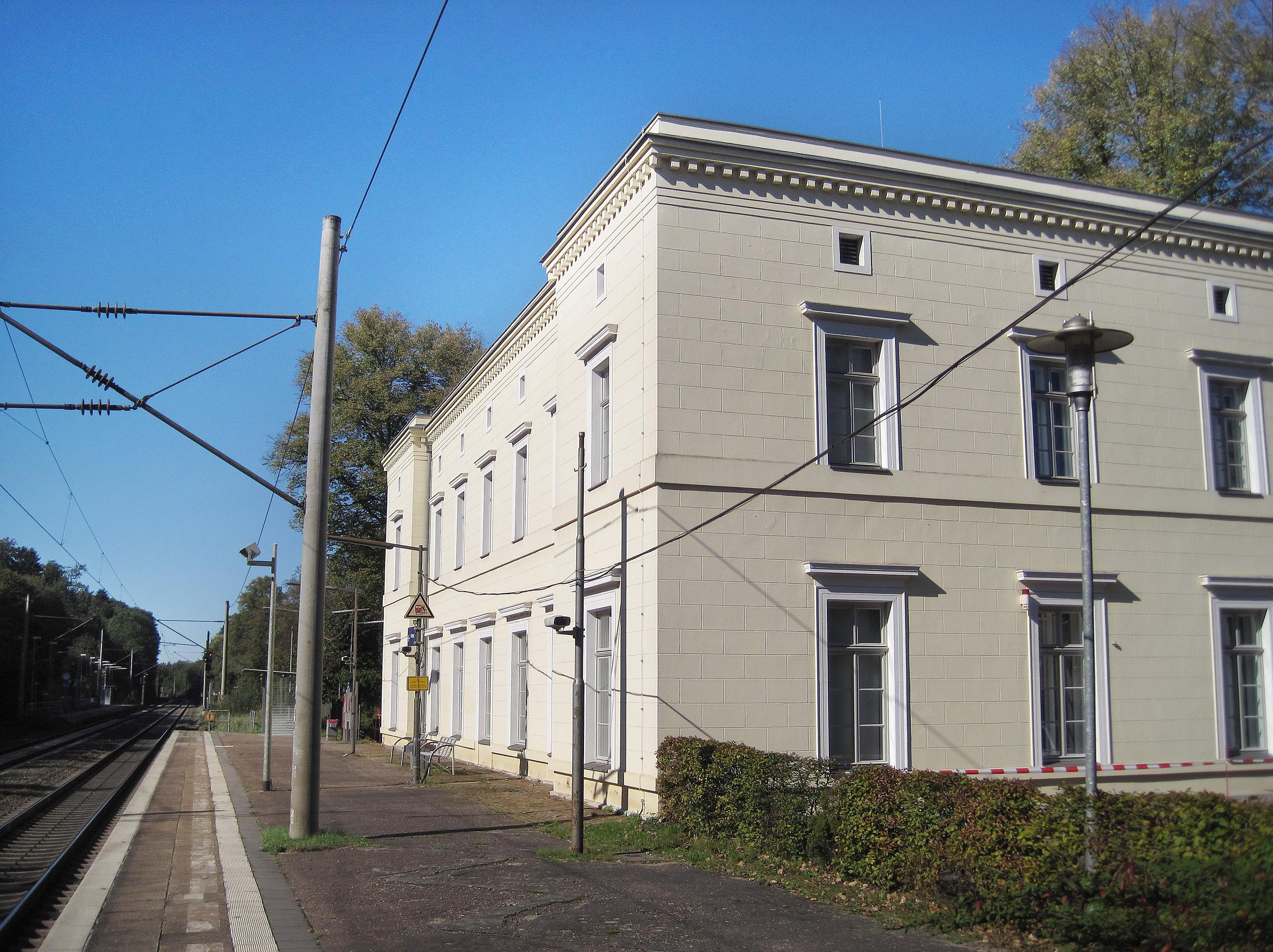
- Former station building

General information
- Location: L208 12, Aumühle, Schleswig-Holstein; Germany
- Coordinates: 53°31′40″N 10°20′28″E
- Line: Berlin–Hamburg (259.7 km)
- Platforms: 2

Construction
- Architectural style: Neoclassical

Other information
- Station code: n/a
- DS100 code: AFRD
- IBNR: 8002113

History
- Opened: 15 December 1846; 179 years ago
- Closed: 14 December 2019; 6 years ago
- Electrified: 29 September 1996; 29 years ago, 15 kV 16.7 Hz AC system (overhead)
Location

Friedrichsruh station is a railway station on the Berlin–Hamburg Railway in the district of Friedrichsruh in the municipality of Aumühle in the German state of Schleswig-Holstein.

The Grade II listed station building, built in the mid-19th century, is one of the oldest surviving station buildings in Schleswig-Holstein and the only one on the line in the state that dates from the construction of the line. Since 2000, it has been the location of the Otto von Bismarck Foundation.

== Location ==
The station is located at kilometre 259.7 of the Berlin–Hamburg Railway. Friedrichsruh is located in the Sachsenwald (Saxony Forest) and was formerly a popular weekend destination for residents of the nearby city of Hamburg. The two side platforms are offset from one another. Travellers pass through an underpass to the other side of the track. East of the station the railway line passes under state road L208.

== History ==
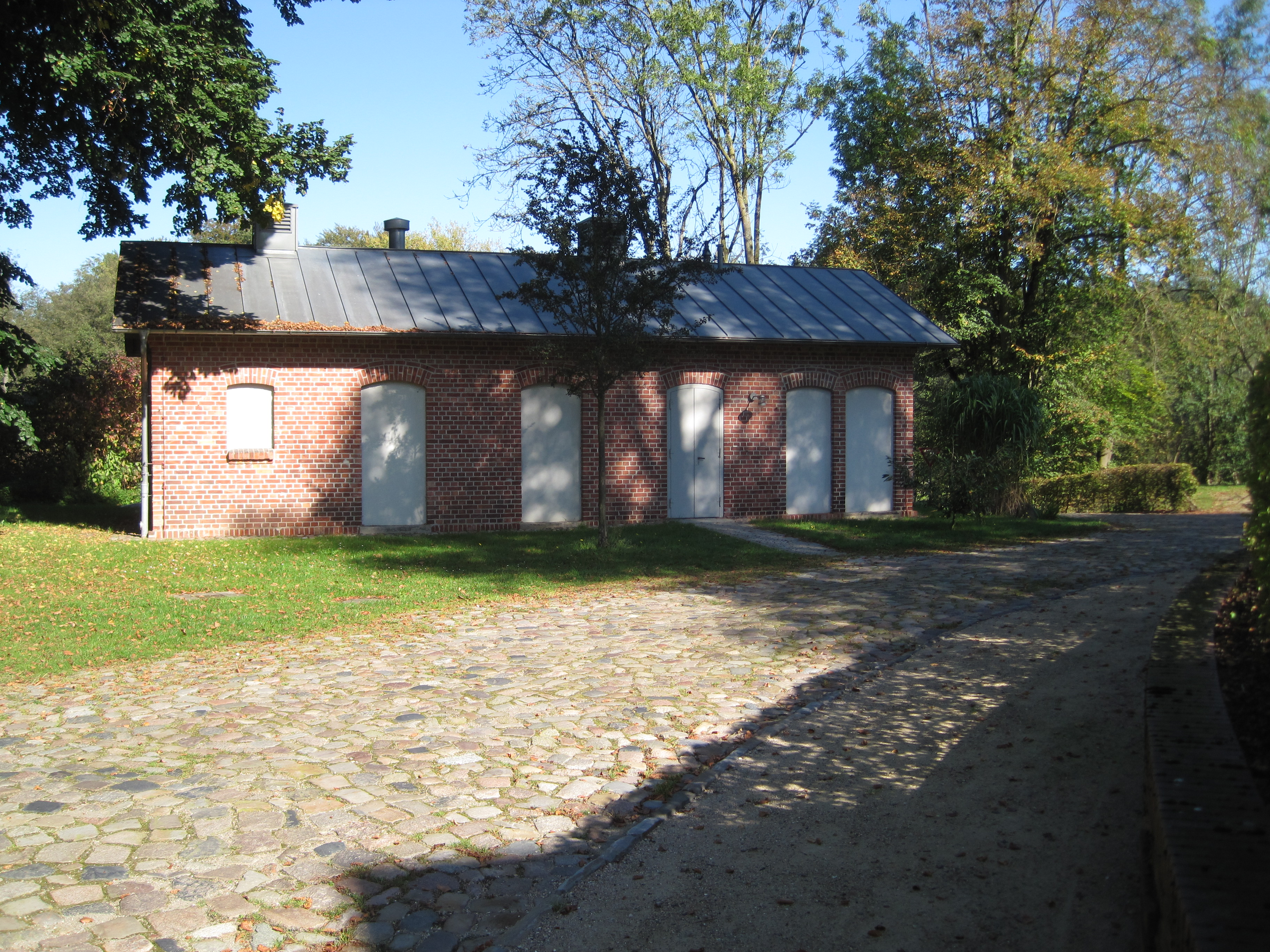
Former toilet block, now the archive of the Bismarck Foundation

The station building at Friedrichsruh was built during the construction of the Berlin–Hamburg line and has survived until today. Like almost all other station buildings on the Berlin-Hamburg Railway, it was built in the Neoclassical style. Thus, there are similarities to, among others, the buildings in Friesack in Brandenburg and in Ludwigslust in Mecklenburg-Vorpommern. Both of these, however, have later additions.

Friedrichsruh was acquired along with the Sachsenwald in 1871 and given to Chancellor Otto von Bismarck by German Emperor William I. Bismarck stayed here many times because of the good transport connections to Berlin. After his retirement in 1890, Friedrichsruh was Bismarck's home. His estate was near the line at the station. Bismarck procured for himself and his guests of state permission for trains to stop at his property, about 250 metres from the entrance building. After Bismarck's death in 1898 about 100,000 people visited the place annually, mostly travelling by train.

Until the 1970s, the Historischer Bahnhof (historical railway station) restaurant was located in the station. Then it stood empty. In the early 1980s the Red Army Faction member Christian Klar used its basement as a hideout and he was arrested at Friedrichsruh in 1982. In the meantime asylum seekers from East Germany arrived at the station building. Until the late 1990s, it was left to decay. After its renovation, the Otto von Bismarck Foundation (Stiftung) moved into it in 2000. It operates the former station building and next to it has research facilities and a museum with a permanent exhibition on German history of the 19th century.

== Passenger services ==
Since the December 2019 schedule update, the station has had no passenger service. The last service to stop at Friedrichsruh was a Regional-Express service between Hamburg Hbf and Büchen, every two hours on Sundays and holidays only.
