= Elmshorn-Barmstedt-Oldesloe railway =

Railway line in Germany

Elmshorn–Bad Oldesloe railway
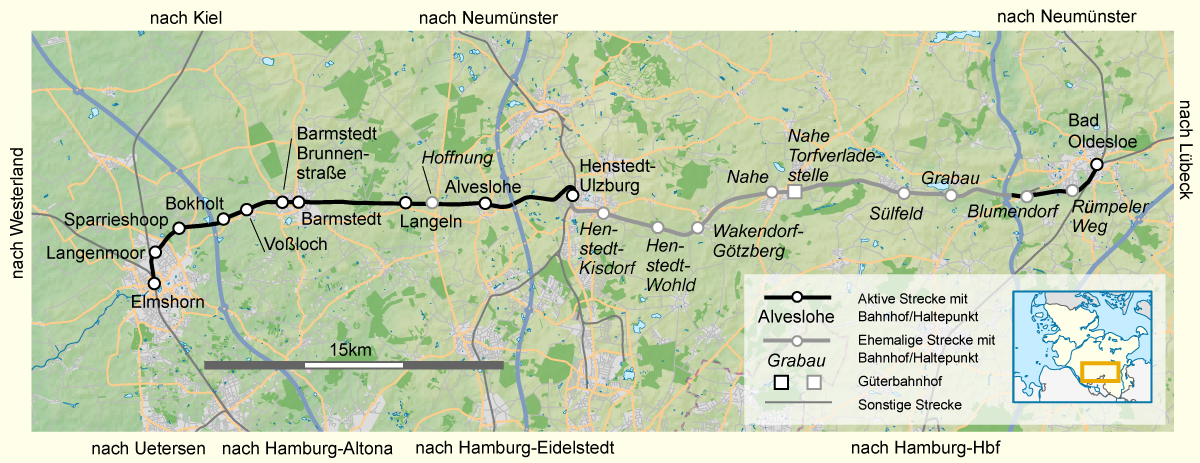

Overview
- Line number: 9120
- Locale: Schleswig-Holstein, Germany

Service
- Route number: 139

Technical
- Line length: 52.7 km (32.7 mi)
- Track gauge: 1,435 mm (4 ft 8 1/2 in) standard gauge
- Operating speed: 80 km/h (49.7 mph) (maximum)

The Elmshorn–Bad Oldesloe railway (also called the Elmshorn–Barmstedt–Oldesloe railway, abbreviated, EBOE or EBO) is a regional railway line that has existed since 1896 in the south of the German state of Schleswig-Holstein. It has been operated since 1981 by the AKN Eisenbahn.

== History ==
A ten km-long narrow gauge railway was opened from Elmshorn to Barmstedt via Elmshorn by the Elmshorn-Barmstedter Eisenbahn-AG (Elmshorn-Barmstedt Railway Company) on 15 July 1896. On 9 June 1907, this was taken over by the Elmshorn-Barmstedt-Oldesloer Eisenbahn-AG (Elmshorn-Barmstedt-Oldesloer Railway Company, EBOE), which was founded on 3 December 1904 in Elmshorn. On the same day, it opened the Barmstedt–Ulzburg (now Henstedt-Ulzburg)–Oldesloe (now Bad Oldesloe) line as a branch line and licensed the previous narrow-gauge railway as a branch line to allow through traffic to the state railway. The construction of the 42 km-long route cost around 2.9 million marks. Eight steam locomotives were available for operations.

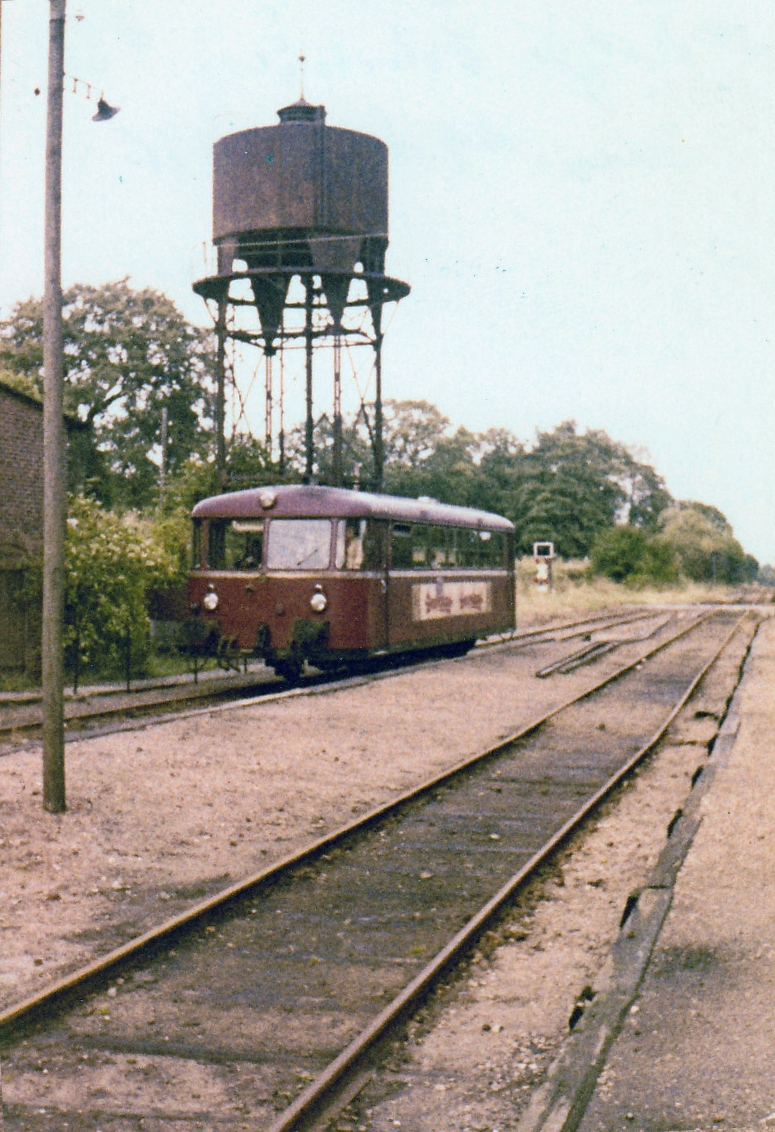
Last service of train 450 on 29 September 1973 in Wakendorf-Götzberg

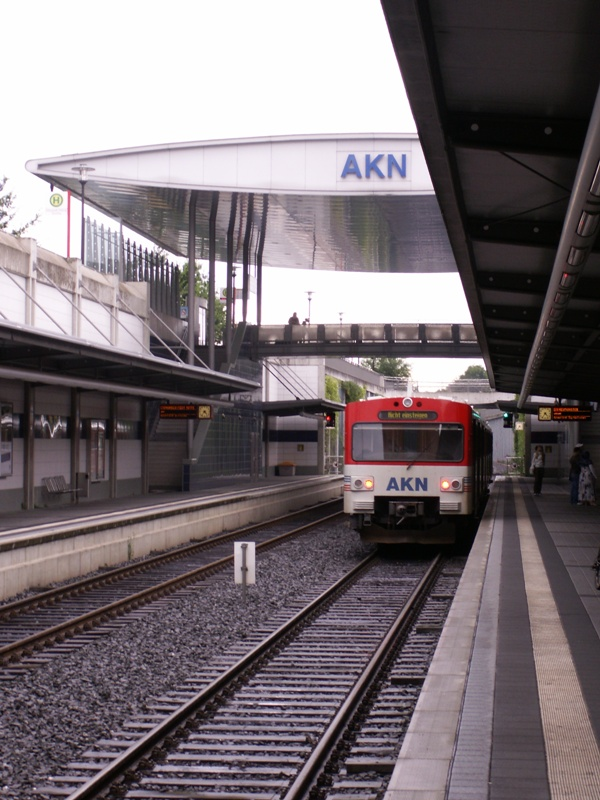
Henstedt-Ulzburg station

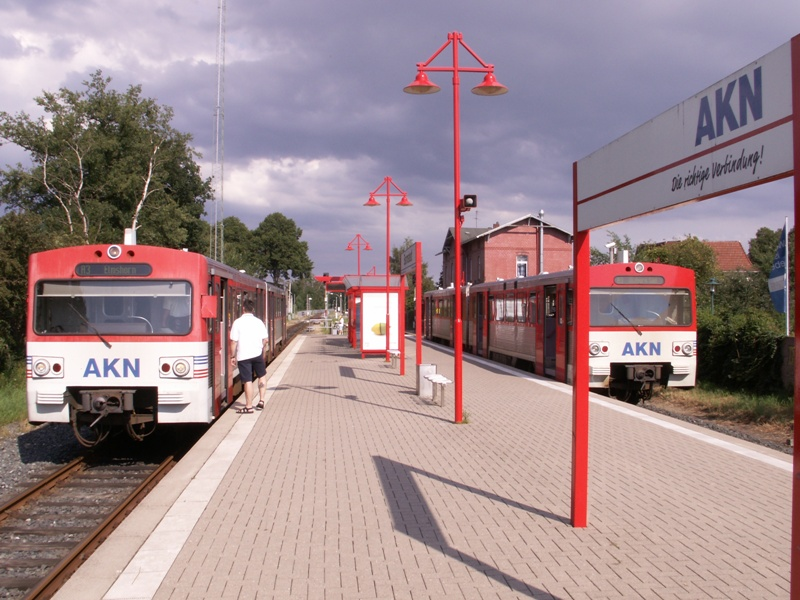
AKN train in Barmstedt station

The now 53 km-long standard gauge route passes through a sparsely populated rural landscape. It was built throughout as a single track, but because of its strategic importance as an east–west connection and a northern bypass of Hamburg, its stations were given long passing loops.

Passenger traffic was worthwhile only between Elmshorn and Barmstedt; the section between Barmstedt and Bad Oldesloe was converted to railcar services in 1931. Freight traffic was just adequate. After the division of Germany in 1945 it lacked through freight trains from the east. This improved after the opening of the border crossing at Herrnburg near Lübeck. Business closures and modal shifts ended these traffic flows in the 1970s. No money was available for necessary route reconstruction and the tracks were still laid in a gravel bed.

On 29 September 1973, passenger traffic between Barmstedt and Bad Oldesloe was closed; a rail replacement service already operated between Barmstedt and Alveslohe.

By the end of 1973, the EBOE had abandoned freight traffic from Barmstedt. For some time the AKN still ran freight from Alveslohe via Ulzburg to Henstedt. It was possible to operate freight between Ulzburg and Blumendorf until 31 December 1981. The four km-long remnant from Blumendorf station to Bad Oldesloe was operated as an industrial mainline track from Bad Oldesloe. The track between Ulzburg and Blumendorf has long since been dismantled. The trackless route has been converted to a cycle path. There are information boards close to this cycle path in the Wakendorf II area and it is Europe's longest path through fruit trees.

Since 1965, the Elmshorn-Barmstedt line has been designated with the line name of EBO by the Hamburger Verkehrsverbund (Hamburg Transport Association, HVV).

=== The EBO as part of AKN Eisenbahn ===
The EBOE has been operated since 1981 by AKN Eisenbahn, which had already managed it since 1957. The section from Barmstedt to Ulzburg was used after its closure for operational movements. The workshop in Barmstedt was not sufficient for the maintenance of modern VT E railcars, but an alternative to upgrading the workshop was to renew the line between Barmstedt and Henstedt-Ulzburg. This was implemented up to 1991 and the workshop in Barmstedt was closed. Passenger services were resumed in 1992, initially with only a few trains daily, and the line was incorporated in the HVV. Since 1999, the line has been regularly operated from Ulzburg Süd (on the main line of the AKN) as line A3.

== Rollingstock ==
As there were initially only light locomotives (with two two-axle carriages hauled by one of five three-axle locomotives of Prussian class T 3), freight made powerful locomotives more necessary. Between 1925 and 1940, locomotives with four or five axle were procured. In 1933, the first three two-axle railcars were used, they had been made in Gothaer Waggonfabrik. As a result, the number of services that could be operated increased from seven pairs of trains in 1930 to 22 pairs of trains. Four-axle railcars were procured in 1951 and 1953 and a MAN railbus was acquired in 1958. Due to the scrapping of the pre-war railcars from 1961, new and used Uerdingen railbuses were purchased. They were single-engined, like the VT 95, but had normal buffers and screw couplings. In order to rationalise vehicle classes, the MAN railbuses were transferred to the Alster Northern Railway in 1968 . With the acquisition by the AKN, it was operated with AKN rollingstock. Two of the Uerdinger railbuses are still operated for special events.
