= Neumünster–Bad Oldesloe railway =

Railway line in Germany

Neumünster–Heide
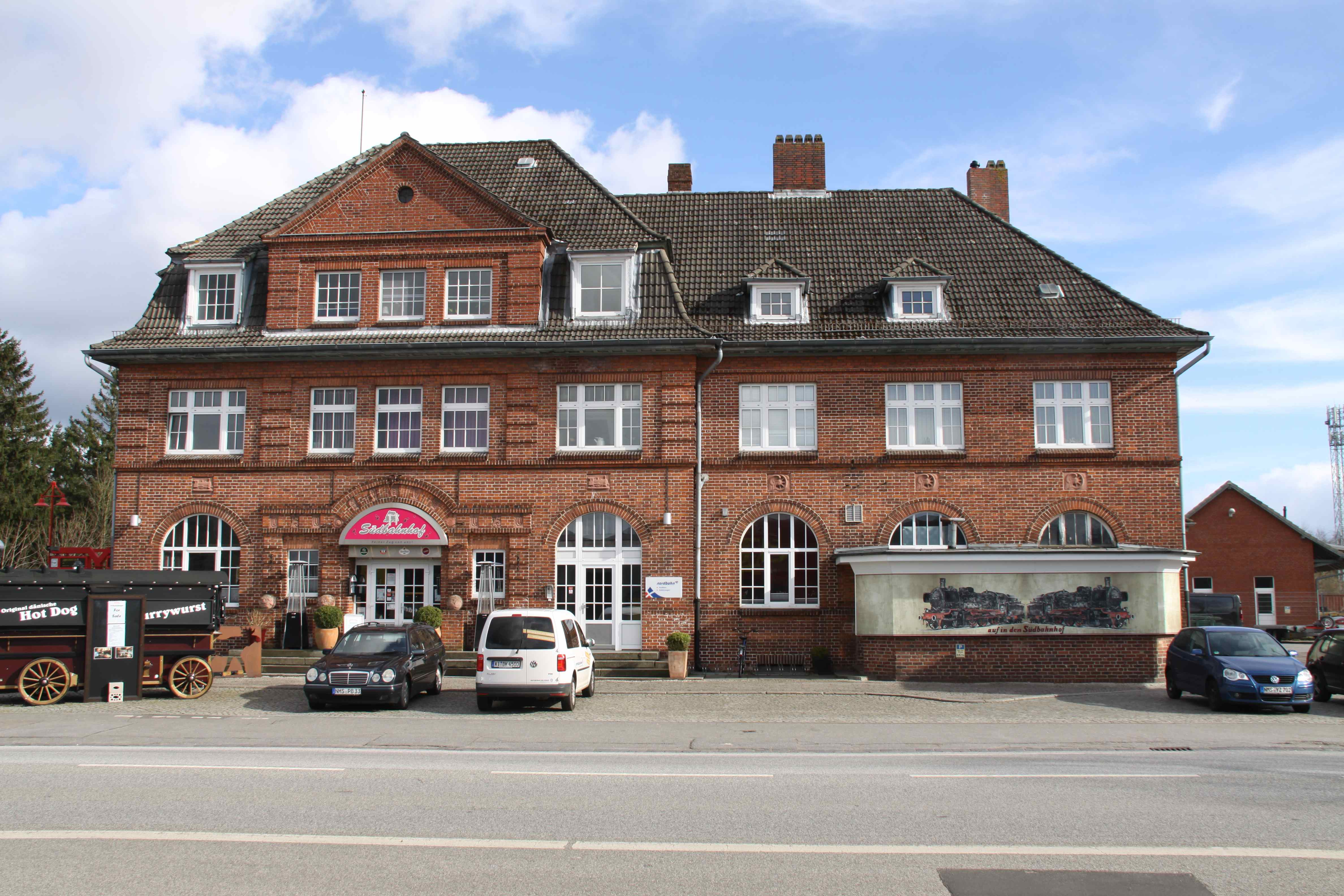
- Neumünster Süd station

Overview
- Line number: 1042
- Locale: Schleswig-Holstein, Germany

Service
- Route number: 132

Technical
- Line length: 63 km (39 mi)
- Track gauge: 1,435 mm (4 ft 8 1/2 in) standard gauge
Route map
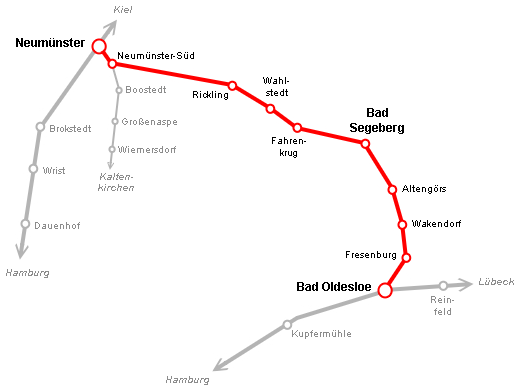
- Source: German railway atlas

The Neumünster–Bad Oldesloe railway is an approximately 45-kilometer-long single-track, non-electrified main line in the German state of Schleswig-Holstein. It connects the central Holstein town of Neumünster with Bad Oldesloe, the seat of the district of Stormarn. Since December 2002, passenger services on the line have been operated by Nordbahn Eisenbahngesellschaft.

== History ==
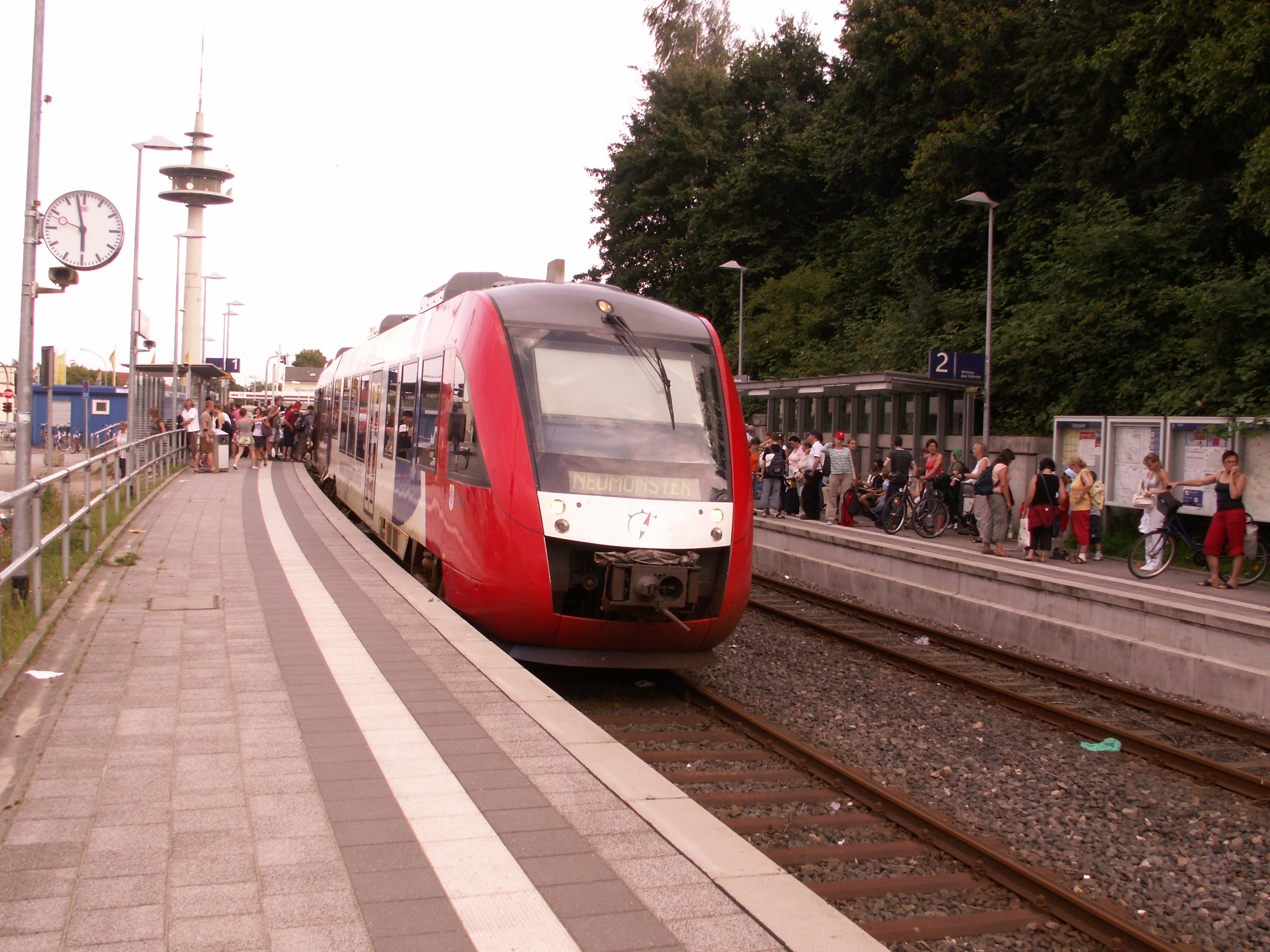
Bad Segeberg station

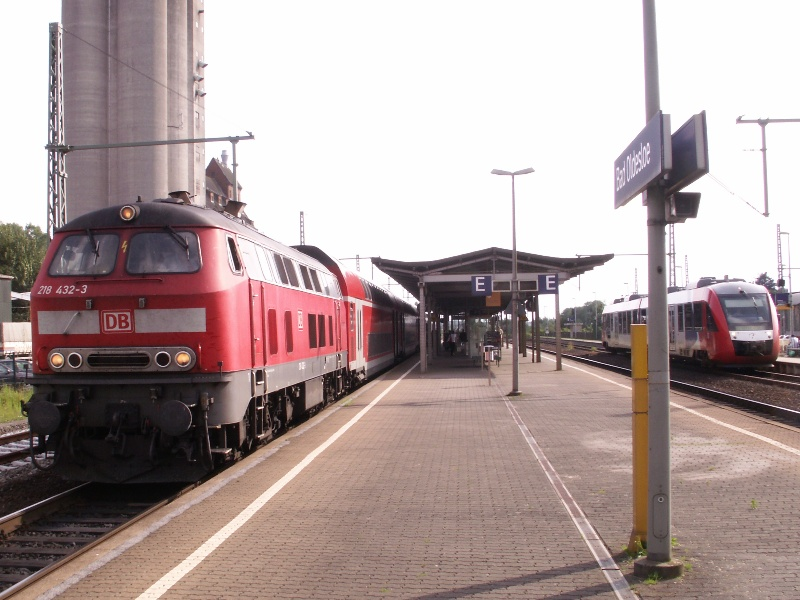
Bad Oldesloe station

The line was opened on 10 December 1875 by the then Altona-Kiel Railway Company (Altona-Kieler Eisenbahn-Gesellschaft, AKE). In 1884, the railway company was nationalised. Until 1945, the line was considered as an extension of the Hagenow Land–Bad Oldesloe railway in Mecklenburg. The kilometre stones of this route still stand on the track (the zero stone is in Neumünster). The track is currently given the route number 1043 beginning in Neumünster (at km 74.376) and ending in Bad Oldesloe (km 119.886).

The line had strategic importance as it was possible for trains to run on the route from Neumünster to Hamburg via Bad Segeberg. This was used mostly for freight transport. From the late 1950s to the 1970s an express service ran on the Flensburg–Neumünster–Bad Oldesloe–Hamburg ran route in the morning.

Passenger traffic on the Neumünster–Bad Segeberg section was closed on 29 September 1984. Part of the line continued to be used for freight and the whole line was kept operational. Freight operations were abandoned between Kleinkummerfeld and Rickling on 25 September 1988 and between Neumünster and Kleinkummerfeld on 30 May 1990. As the Federal Transport Ministry had not approved the abandonment of passenger traffic on the rest of the route as requested by Deutsche Bundesbahn, passenger services on the remaining section from Bad Segeberg to Bad Oldesloe were operated hourly from the summer 1989 timetable. Deutsche Bundesbahn operated class 628 diesel multiple units. In December 2002, the disused section was reactivated for passengers after numerous delays. The existing Kleinkummerfeld station was not put back into operation until 1984. Rickling-Ölweiche station had been abandoned at the time of cessation of services between Neumünster and Bad Segeberg in 1984 and had not been maintained for several years before that. Neumünster Süd AKN station and Wahlstedt station have only been served since the reactivation of the line.

== Current operations ==
The line is currently operated hourly by Nordbahn Eisenbahngesellschaft with Alstom Coradia LINT diesel multiple units. All trains serve the entire route and stop at all stations, although Altengörs and Fresenburg are request stops. The journey takes around 45 minutes.

Both the state, as purchaser of services, and the operating company were surprised by the high numbers of passengers. The trains are often crowded at peak times. As a first step, a parallel bus service was introduced because the platforms at some stations are too short for operating double sets. However, a double set has been used since 12 December 2011 in the morning from Neumünster at 6:37 and from Oldesloe at 7:42, and in the afternoon from Neumünster at 16:37 and from Oldesloe at 17:42. Only the three front doors of the trains can be used at the short platforms.

== Future ==
The line has been proposed for duplication and electrification by the Federal Ministry of Transport, Construction and Urban Development. This would benefit both freight and passenger operations. In 2010 a review of the plan showed a benefit-cost ratio of 0.6 for the about €300 million project and therefore it could not be financed with federal funds. This is due to lower demand for freight than originally assumed in the original plan, as it has since been decided to proceed with the Fehmarn Belt Fixed Link.
