= Jübek–Husum railway =

Railway line in Germany

Overview
- Line number: 1011

Service
- Route number: 134

Technical
- Line length: 26.3 km (16.3 mi)
- Track gauge: 1,435 mm (4 ft 8 1/2 in) standard gauge

The Jübek–Husum railway is a single-track, non-electrified branch line in the German state of Schleswig-Holstein, which originated from the line of the Flensburg–Husum–Tönning Railway Company. The original line was opened in 1854 and is one of the oldest railways in Germany.

== Route ==
The line begins in the third Husum station, which was opened in 1910 for the line to Erfde and Rendsburg. This station is the main hub of the North Sea coast of Schleswig-Holstein. In addition to the trains to and from Kiel it is served by the trains of the Marsh Railway and the Husum–Bad St. Peter-Ording line. The line runs to Jübek through flat geest lands to the northeast and reaches the Mühlenbach stream in Ohrstedt. No operating stations or passing loops are left between Husum and Jübek.

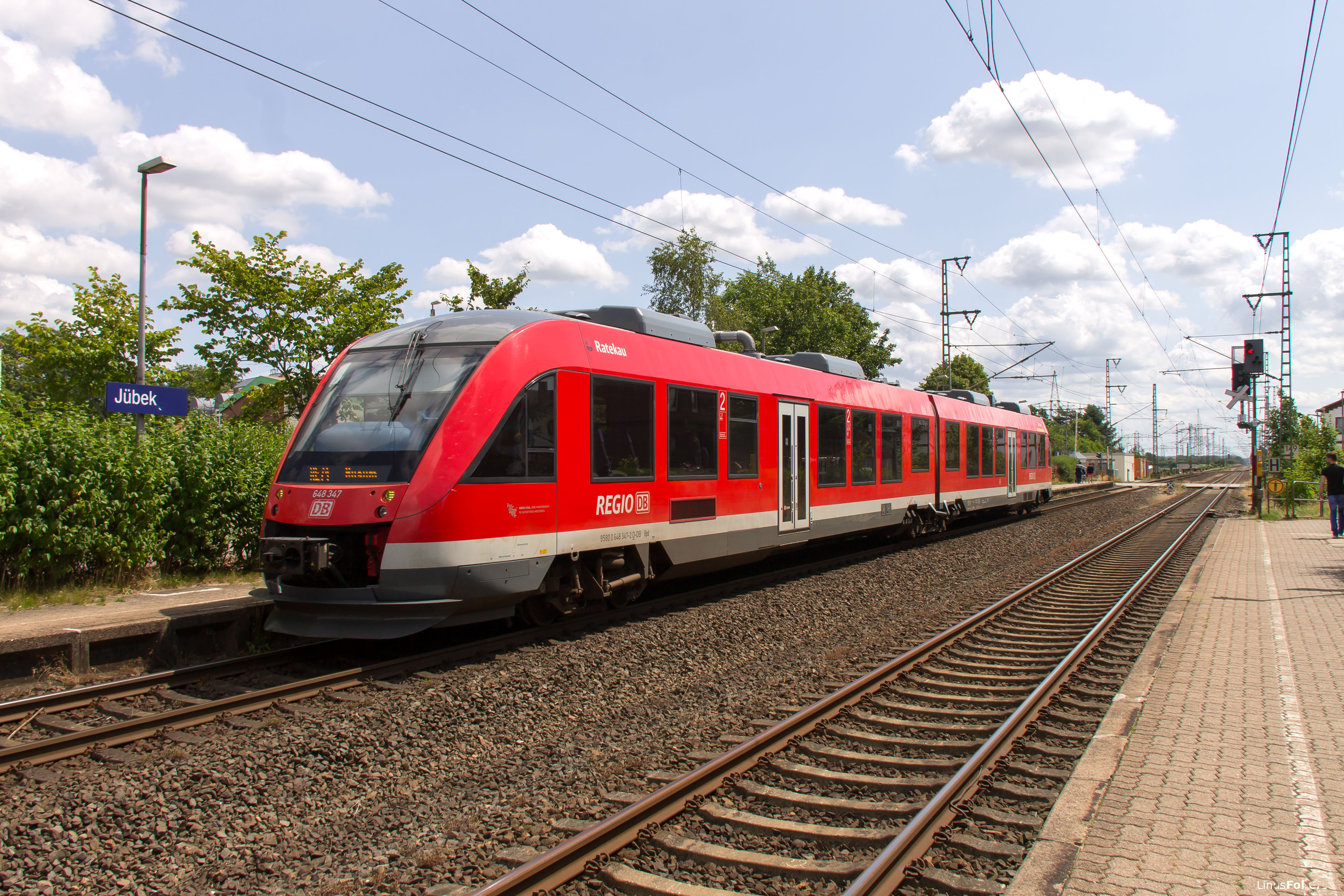
LINT41 in Jübek station (2015)

Several stations along the line were abandoned in the early 1980s or served only by freight traffic. In Jübek, the line connects to the Neumünster–Flensburg railway. Until 1974, the original line from Husum to Rendsburg via Erfde, opened on 1 September 1910, merged into the Neumünster–Flensburg railway in Büdelsdorf.

== History ==
Most of this 26 km line was built as part of the Flensburg–Husum–Tönning line, completed by the Flensburg-Husum-Tönningen Railway Company (Flensburg-Husum-Tönninger Eisenbahngesellschaft, FHTE) on 25 October 1854, for, among other things, the transportation of cattle to Great Britain and had already reached Husum 32 years before its connection to the Marsh Railway. After the annexation of the Duchy of Schleswig by Prussia after the Second Schleswig War of 1864, the northeastern section of this line, from Eggebek via Schleswig to Neumünster, was rerouted. From Sollbrück, where the old line was repurposed as far as Ohrstedt and Husum, the connection to Jübek station on the shorter diversionary route opened on 29 December 1869.

Long before the Rendsburg–Husum railway was closed, express trains ran via Jübek. In 1959, for example, the line was served by two locomotive-hauled express train pairs on the Husum–Kiel route. In addition, there were local trains that served every intermediate station. Their journey time was approximately 37 minutes. Rosendahl station was the first intermediate station on the line to be closed, before 1975. Today, trains no longer stop between Husum and Jübek. The last freight customer on the line, the German Armed Forces (Bundeswehr), maintained a rail siding in Ohrstedt for freight traffic until the end of 2001. This resulted in a gap in the morning passenger timetable. The Bundeswehr siding has been operational again since 2006.

== Current operations ==
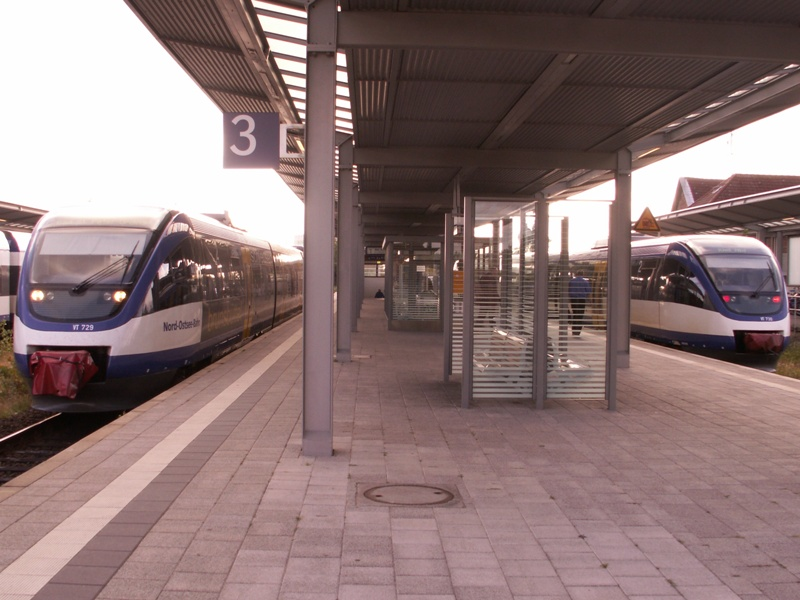
Railcars of the previous operator, NOB, to Kiel in Husum station

Passenger services have been operated since December 2011 by Deutsche Bahn with Alstom Coradia LINT 41 railcars at hourly intervals. It replaced Nord-Ostsee-Bahn (NOB) as operator.

From December 2023, Nordbahn Eisenbahngesellschaft (NBE) will take over operation of the northern part of the Schleswig-Holstein battery network and thus also the traffic on this route.

As part of the planned electrification of the Marsh Railway between Itzehoe and Westerland (Sylt) from 2027 onwards, NAH.SH aims to also electrify the Jübek–Husum line.
