= Neumünster–Flensburg railway =

Railway line in Germany

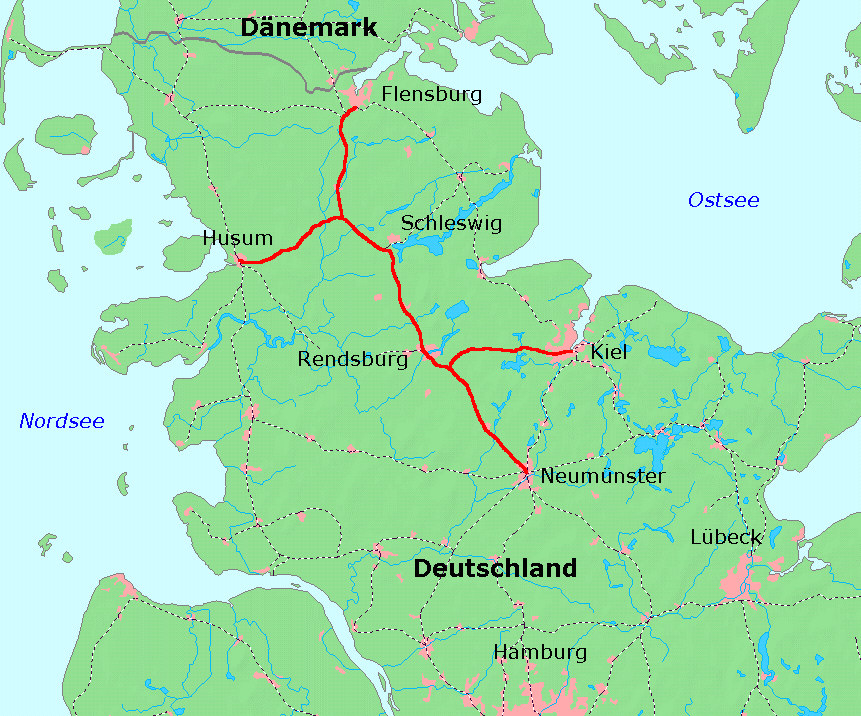
- Neumünster–Flensburg and branches to Kiel and Husum

Overview
- Line number: 131 (Kiel–Husum); 134 (Neumünster–Flensburg)
- Locale: Schleswig-Holstein

Service
- Route number: 1040

Technical
- Line length: 101.542 km (63.095 mi)
- Number of tracks: 2 (throughout)
- Track gauge: 1,435 mm (4 ft 8 1/2 in) standard gauge
- Electrification: 15 kV/16.7 Hz AC overhead catenary
- Operating speed: 160 km/h (99.4 mph) (max)

The Neumünster Flensburg Railway is part of the Jutland line, the main north–south rail link through Schleswig-Holstein, Germany. Together with the line to Husum, which diverges in Jübek, and the line to Kiel, which diverges in Rendsburg, it also serves as an important east–west axis between Kiel (on the east coast) and the Marsh Railway on the west coast. It consists of several sections that were parts of the first railways in the current territory of Germany.

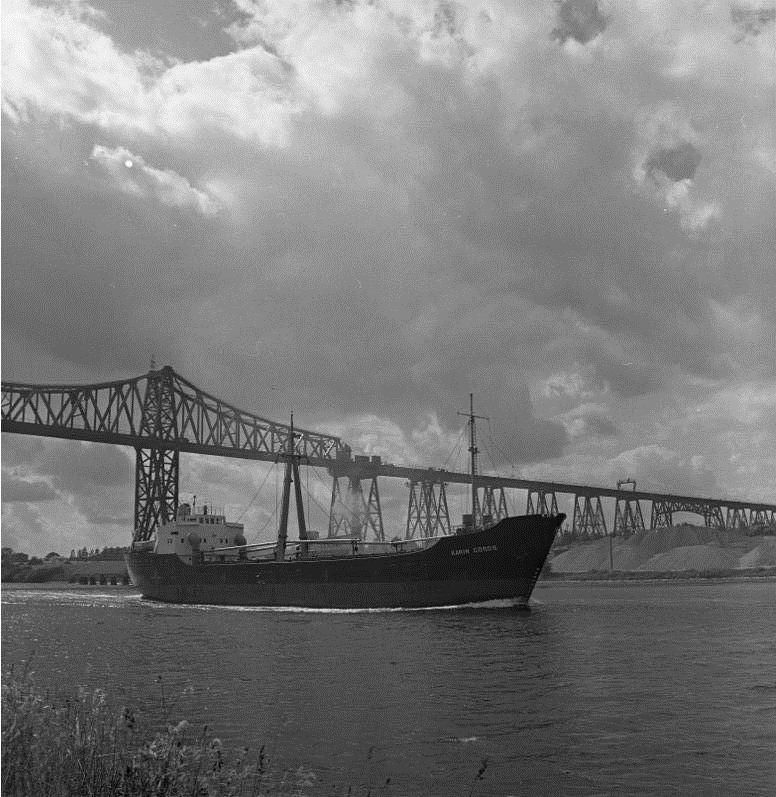
Rendsburg High Bridge in 1961

== Route ==
The route passes through predominantly agricultural plains. The line is notable for the engineering structures of the Rendsburg High Bridge and the Rendsburg Loop.

In Flensburg the line has since 1927 run around the town in a big loop on the then southern outskirts of town. The line connects at its southern end at Neumünster to the Hamburg-Altona–Kiel line and at its northern end at Flensburg to the line to Denmark. In between its main hubs are at Rendsburg station (where the line to Kiel branches off), Jübek station (where the line to Husum branches off) and Schleswig station.

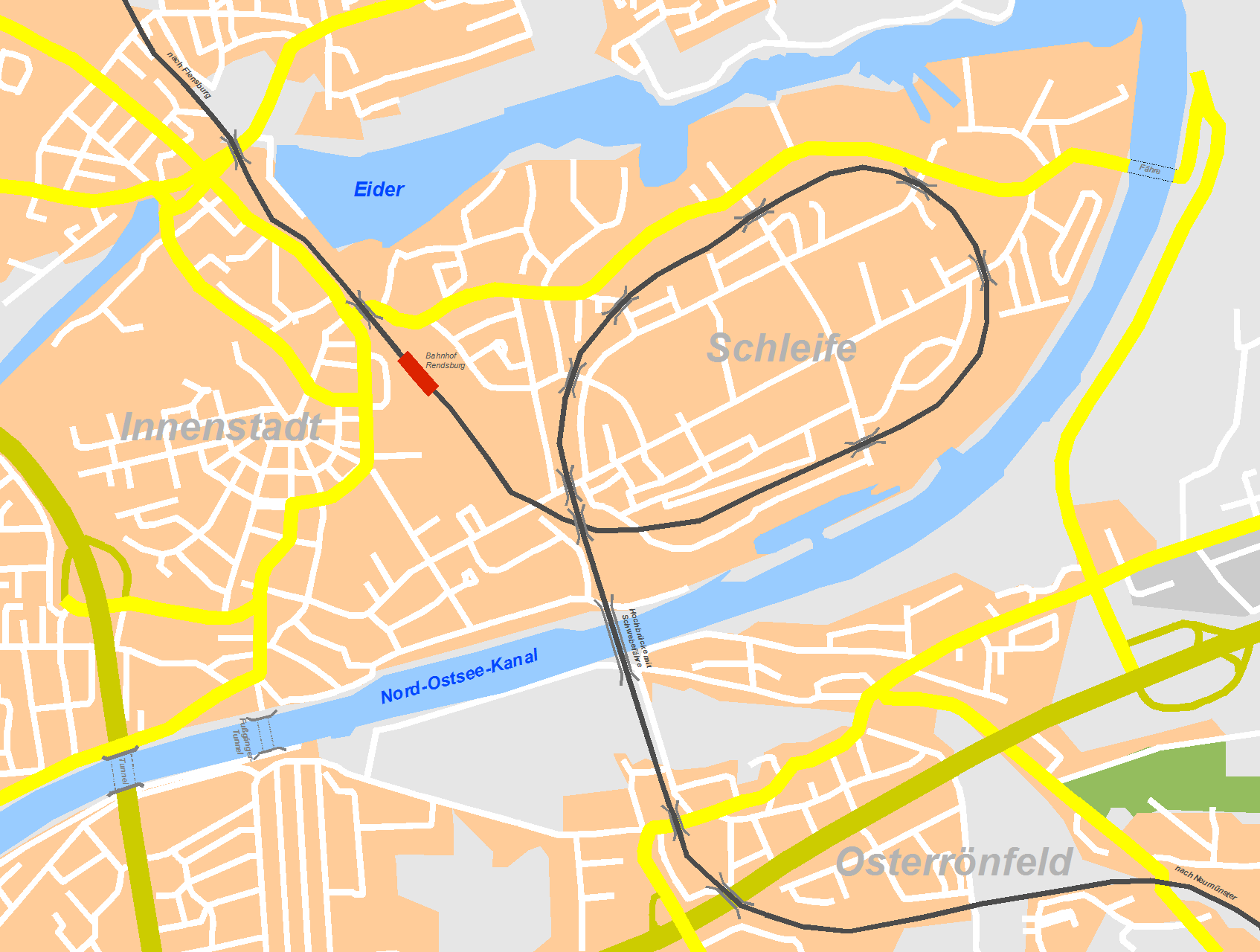
Rendsburg Loop

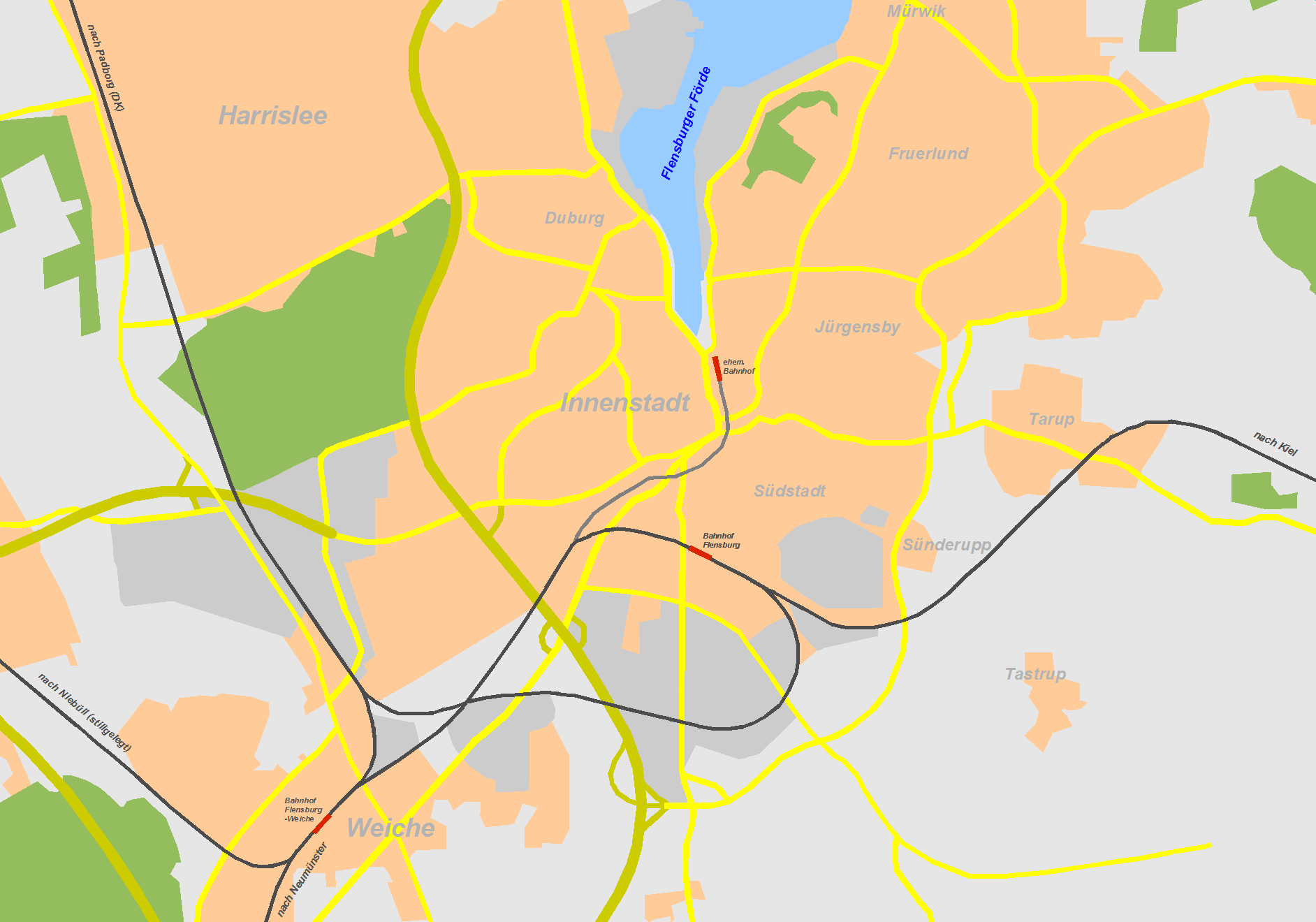
Flensburg lines

== Operation and history ==
=== Formation ===
The line gained its current form after the annexation of the Duchy of Schleswig by Prussia following the after the Second Schleswig War of 1864 and Austro-Prussian War of 1866, and contains sections built for other purposes.

An approximately 34 km-long line, financed by regional stakeholders as the Rendsburg-Neumünster Railway Company (German: Rendsburg-Neumünsterschen Eisenbahn-Gesellschaft), and opened on 18 September 1845. On 1 January 1864 it was integrated in the network of the Altona-Kiel Railway Company (Altona-Kieler Eisenbahn-Gesellschaft).

On 1 April 1854 the Flensburg–Husum–Tönning Railway Company (Flensburg-Husum-Tönninger Eisenbahngesellschaft) opened a line from Tönning on the North Sea to a station located outside Flensburg at Holzkrug; on 4 October the company added a terminus in Flensburg, later called the English Station (Englischer Bahnhof). This station was at the south end of Flensburg Fjord in the Flensburg old town and was formally handed over for operations on 25 October by the Danish king, Frederik VII. The line was built by the British firm of Samuel Morton Peto mainly for the transport of live cattle to England. This company also built the port railways in Flensburg and Tonning in 1854. On 25 October 1854, the company opened a 40 km-long branch was from Flensburg–Husum–Tönning line at Ohrstedt to Rendsburg via Owschlag. This line passed to the west of the town of Schleswig and further south through Klosterkrug.

Schleswig was connected to Klosterkrug with a five kilometre-long branch line on 2 June 1858. Following the annexation of the Duchy of Schleswig by Prussia, the Altona-Kiel Railway opened a 23 km-long line in 1869 from Klosterkrug to Jübek and Eggebek via Schleswig-Friedrichberg (partly using the branch line opened in 1858), which was 17 km shorter that the old route via Ohrstedt. A short cut was built from Jübek to the line from Flensburg to Husum, which is now part of the Jübek–Husum railway and the section of the Flensburg–Husum–Tönning Railway running southwest of Eggebek towards Ohrstedt was abandoned, as was the Schleswig Railways line from Klosterkrug to Ohrstedt.

On 26 March 1898, the Prussian State Railways opened the Rendsburg port railway on the then Kaiser-Wilhelm Canal, now the Kiel Canal. In preparation for the widening of the canal, the Rendsburg High Bridge was built and commissioned with a large loop so that the existing Rendsburg station could still be used; they were formally opened on 1 December 1913.

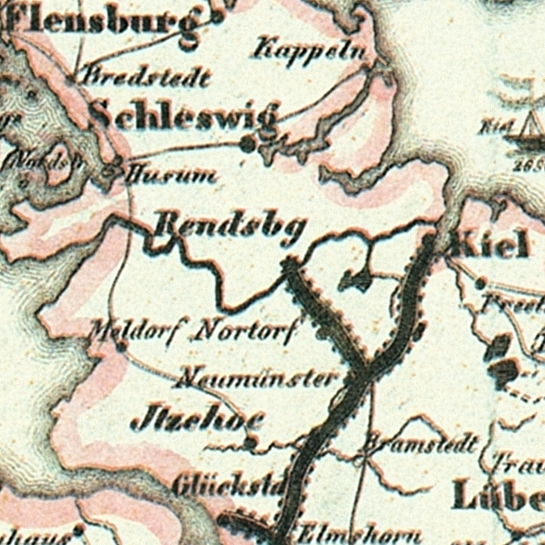
1849

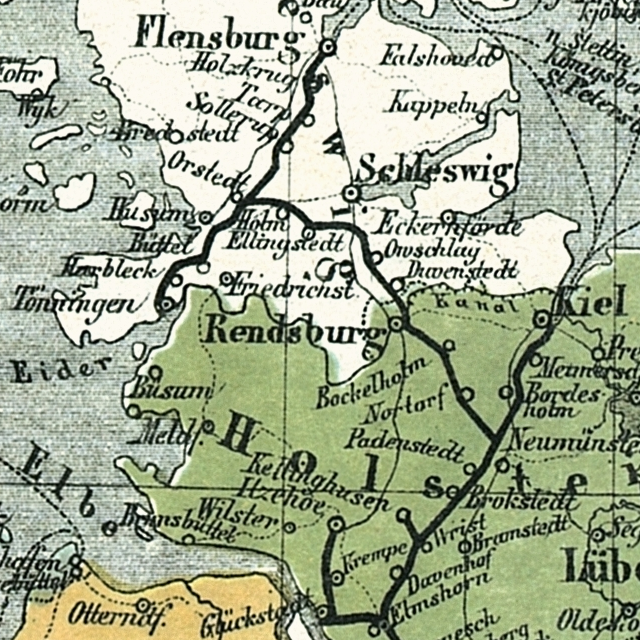
1861

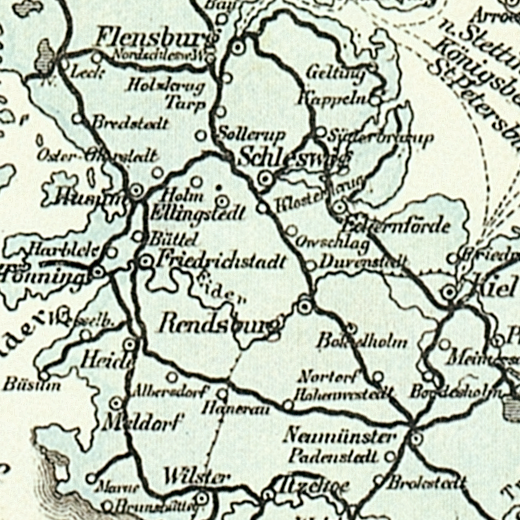
1899

== Current operation ==
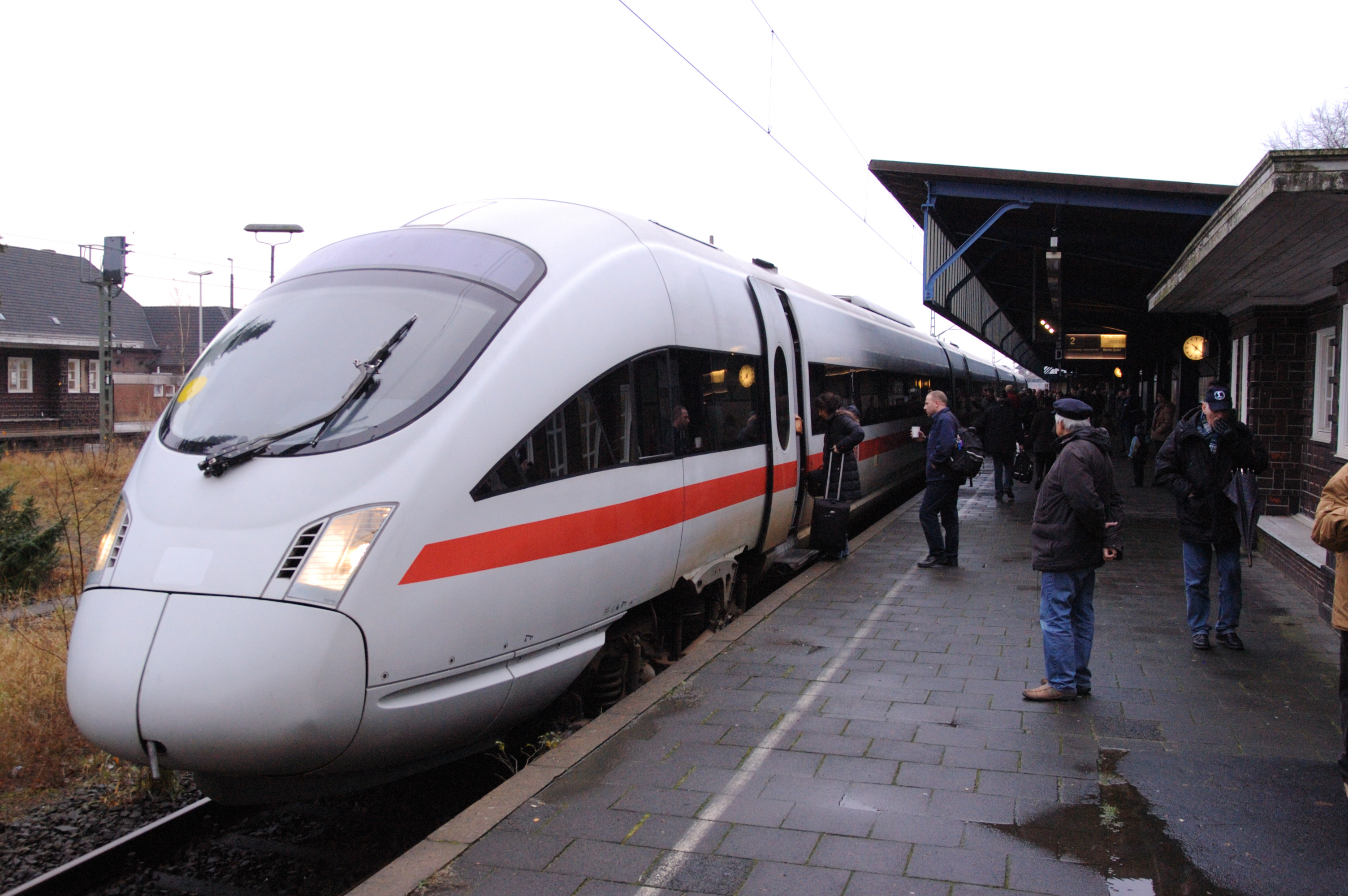
First InterCityExpress to serve Flensburg on 9 December 2007

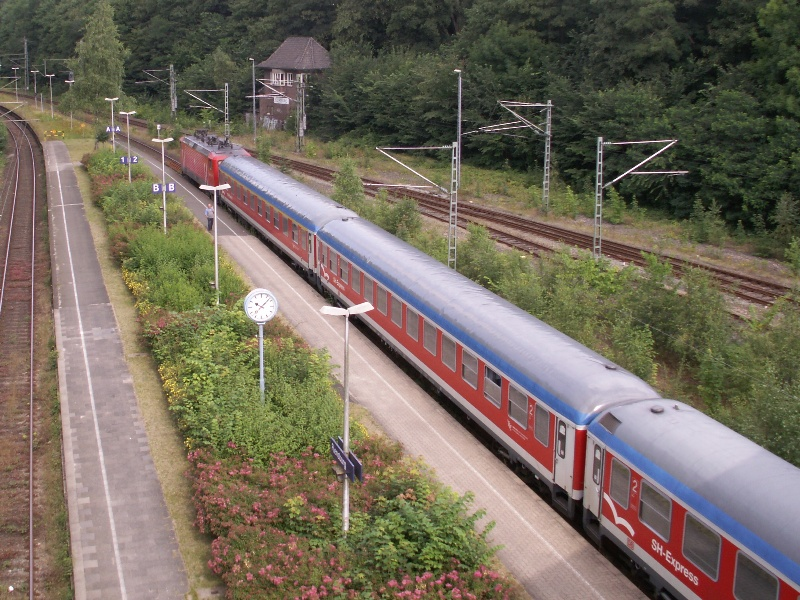
Schleswig-Holstein-Express

EC 75 InterCity service runs between Hamburg and Copenhage and EC/RJ 27 ICE service between Prague and Copenhagen, all stopping at Schleswig.

The DB Regionalbahn Schleswig Holstein operates hourly Regional-Express services between Neumünster and Flensburg. It also operates hourly services on the Husum–Kiel route with modern trains. During Kiel Week services on this route increase substantially and some locomotive-hauled trains are operated.

In the 2026 timetable, the following services stopped Schleswig station:

Line	Route	Interval	Operator
ICE 4	Padborg – Flensburg – Schleswig – Hamburg – Hannover – Frankfurt – Frankfurt Airport regional	One train pair	DB Fernverkehr
RJ 27	Copenhagen – Schleswig – Hamburg – Berlin – Dresden – Prague	Two train pairs	DB Fernverkehr / České dráhy
ECE 75	Hamburg – Schleswig – Padborg – Kolding – Odense – Ringsted – Copenhagen	Every two hours	DB Fernverkehr / DSB
RE 7	Hamburg – Elmshorn – Neumünster – Rendsburg – Schleswig – Flensburg	Hourly	DB Regio Nord
RE 74	Husum – Jübek – Schleswig – Owschlag – Rendsburg – Felde – Kiel	Hourly	nordbahn

=== Freight traffic ===
This line is part of the main route for freight from Germany to Denmark and Sweden. From 2011, trains up to 835 metres long run regularly on the line.
