= Rendsburg station =

Railway station in Rendsburg, Germany

Rendsburg
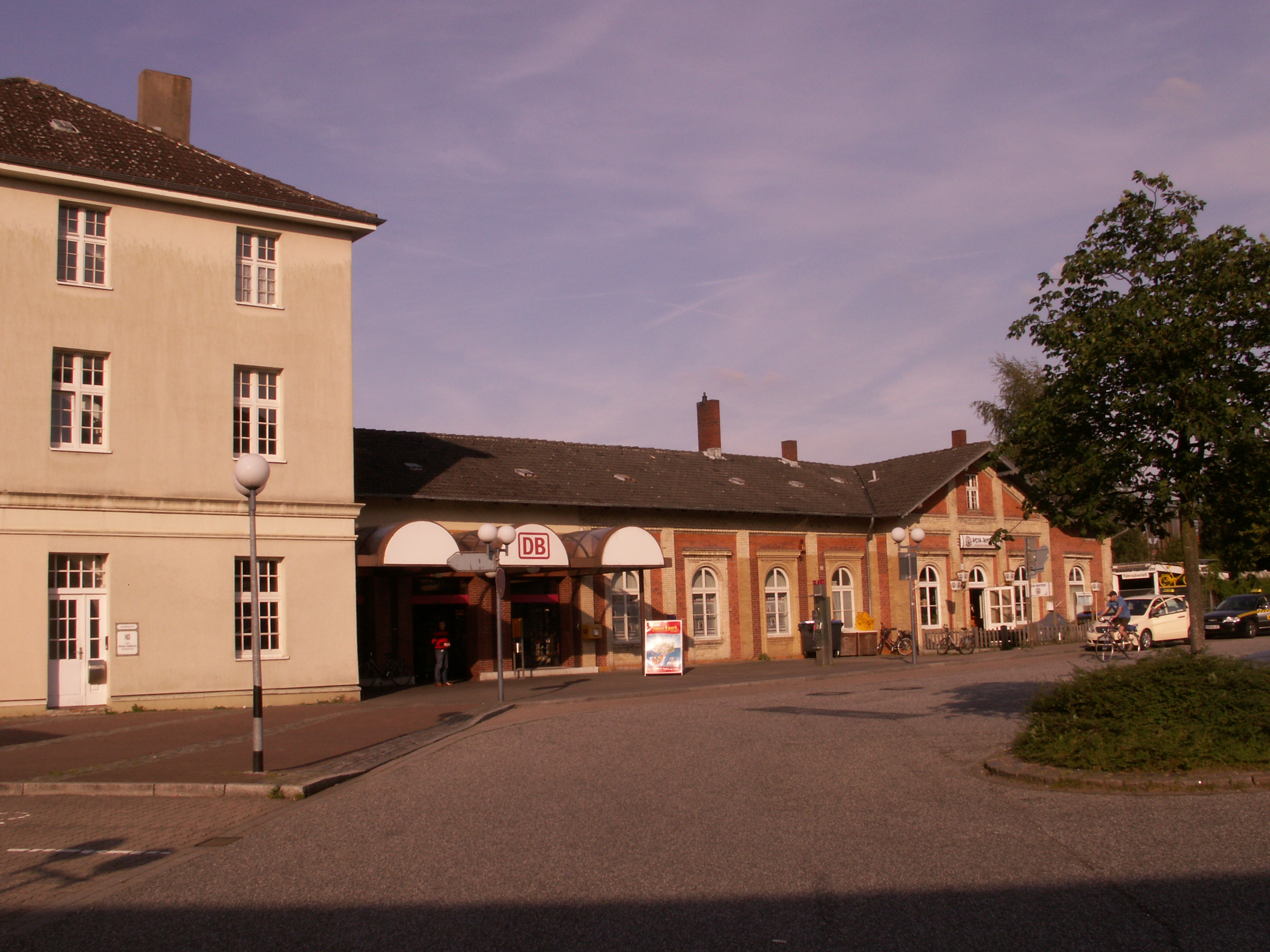

General information
- Location: Am Bahnhof 20, Rendsburg; Schleswig-Holstein, Germany
- Coordinates: 54°18′09″N 9°40′15″E
- Lines: Neumünster–Flensburg (113.9 km); Rendsburg–Kiel (113.9 km); former Husum–Rendsburg (39.9 km); connecting line to Rendsburg District Railway
- Platforms: 4

Construction
- Accessible: Yes

Other information
- Station code: 5223
- DS100 code: AR
- IBNR: 8000312
- Category: 4
- Website: www.bahnhof.de

History
- Opened: 18 September 1845
- Former names: Rendsburg-Glacis

Services
Preceding station	DB Regio Nord	Following station
Owschlag towards Flensburg	RE 7	Nortorf towards Hamburg Hbf
Preceding station		Following station
Owschlag towards Husum	RE 74	Felde towards Kiel Hbf
Terminus	RB 75	Schülldorf towards Kiel Hbf
Location

Rendsburg station is located in the city of Rendsburg in the German state of Schleswig-Holstein and is at the junction of the Neumünster–Flensburg and Rendsburg–Kiel lines. It is currently operated by Deutsche Bahn, which classifies it as a category 4 station. There used to be a direct line from Rendsburg to Husum via Erfde, as distinct from the current route via Jübek. A short section of the Erfde line is still used for the carriage of freight.

At the beginning of the 20th century, the Kiel Canal was built as along with Rendsburg High Bridge over it and the Rendsburg Loop, which allowed trains to continue to use Rendsburg station. The station’s roof was renovated from 2007 to 2009. Later, the platforms were rehabilitated. Following the completion of the renovation the station it has five tracks, four of which have a platform.

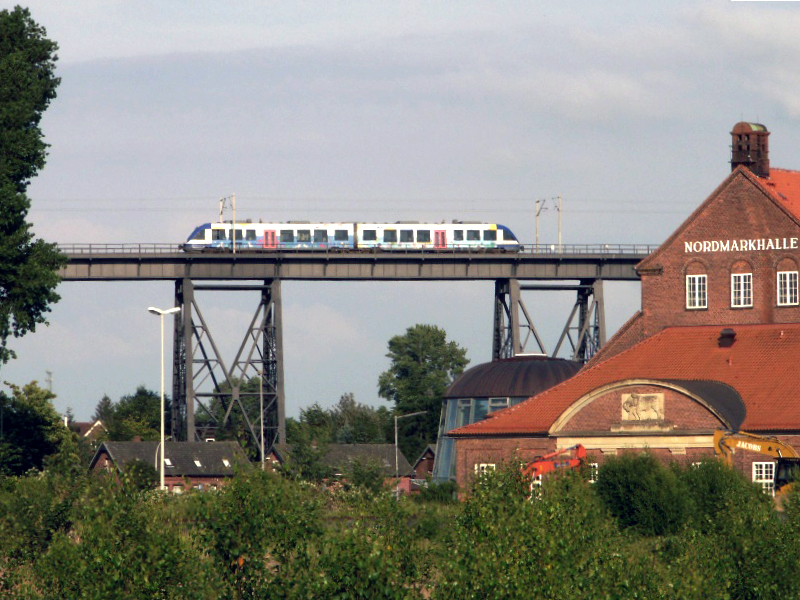
NOB train on the Rendsburg Loop

== History ==
The approximately 34 km-long Neumünster–Flensburg railway, funded by local interests, was opened by the Rendsburg-Neumünster Railway Company (Rendsburg-Neumünstersche Eisenbahn) between Neumünster and the station then known as Rendsburg-Glacis as part of the Jutland Line (Jütlandlinie) on 18 September 1845. This was followed on 1 January 1847 by a connection to the port railway from Rendsburg-Glacis to Rendsburg-Obereider.

== Rail services ==
DB Regio Nord operates Regional-Express and Regionalbahn services between Neumünster and Flensburg every hour. The Husum–Jübek–Schleswig–Rendsburg route has been operated by DB Regio since 2011. In the 2026 timetable, the following services stop at the station:

Line	Route	Frequency	Operator
RE 7	Schleswig-Holstein-Express: Flensburg – Rendsburg – Neumünster – Hamburg	Hourly	DB Regio Nord
RE 74	Kiel – Rendsburg – Schleswig – Husum	Hourly	nordbahn
RB 75	Kiel – Rendsburg	Hourly	nordbahn

=== Tracks ===
The station has five tracks, four of which are located on a platform. The tracks the movement of persons to be spanned by a platform area. Trains leave as follows:

- Platform track 1: long-distance and regional trains towards Hamburg, regional trains towards Neumünster and Kiel,
- Platform track 2: regional services to Kiel,
- Platform track 3: long-distance services to Denmark, regional services to Flensburg/Padborg, regional services to Husum/Bad St. Peter-Ording,
- Platform track 4: no scheduled services.

== Gallery ==
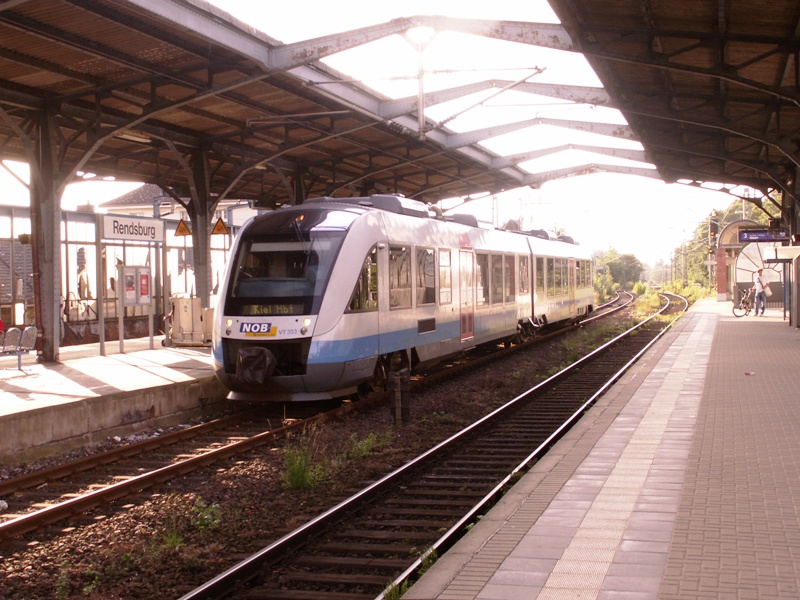
NOB train to Kiel

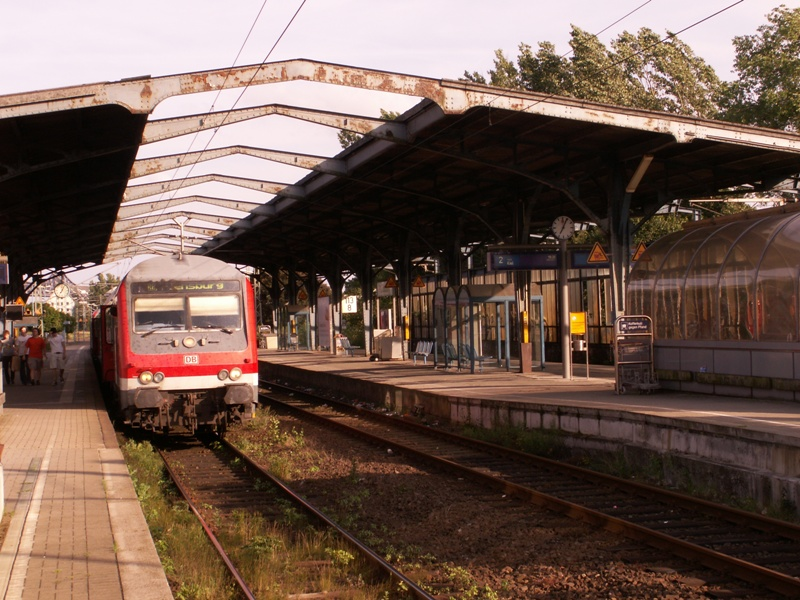
RB-SH train to Flensburg

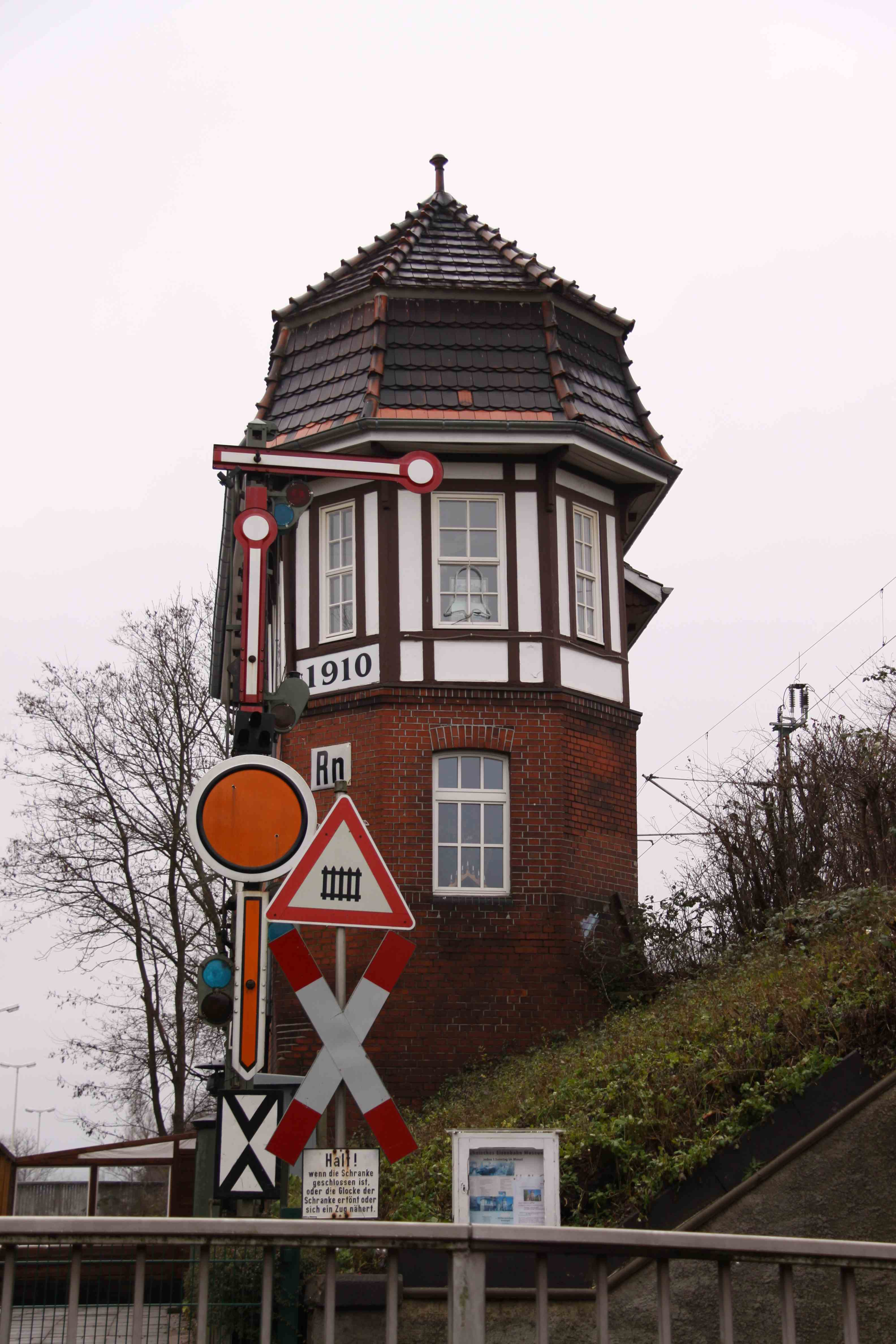
Preserved signalbox in Rendsburg station
