= Husum station (Germany) =

Railway station in Husum, Germany

Husum Hüsem
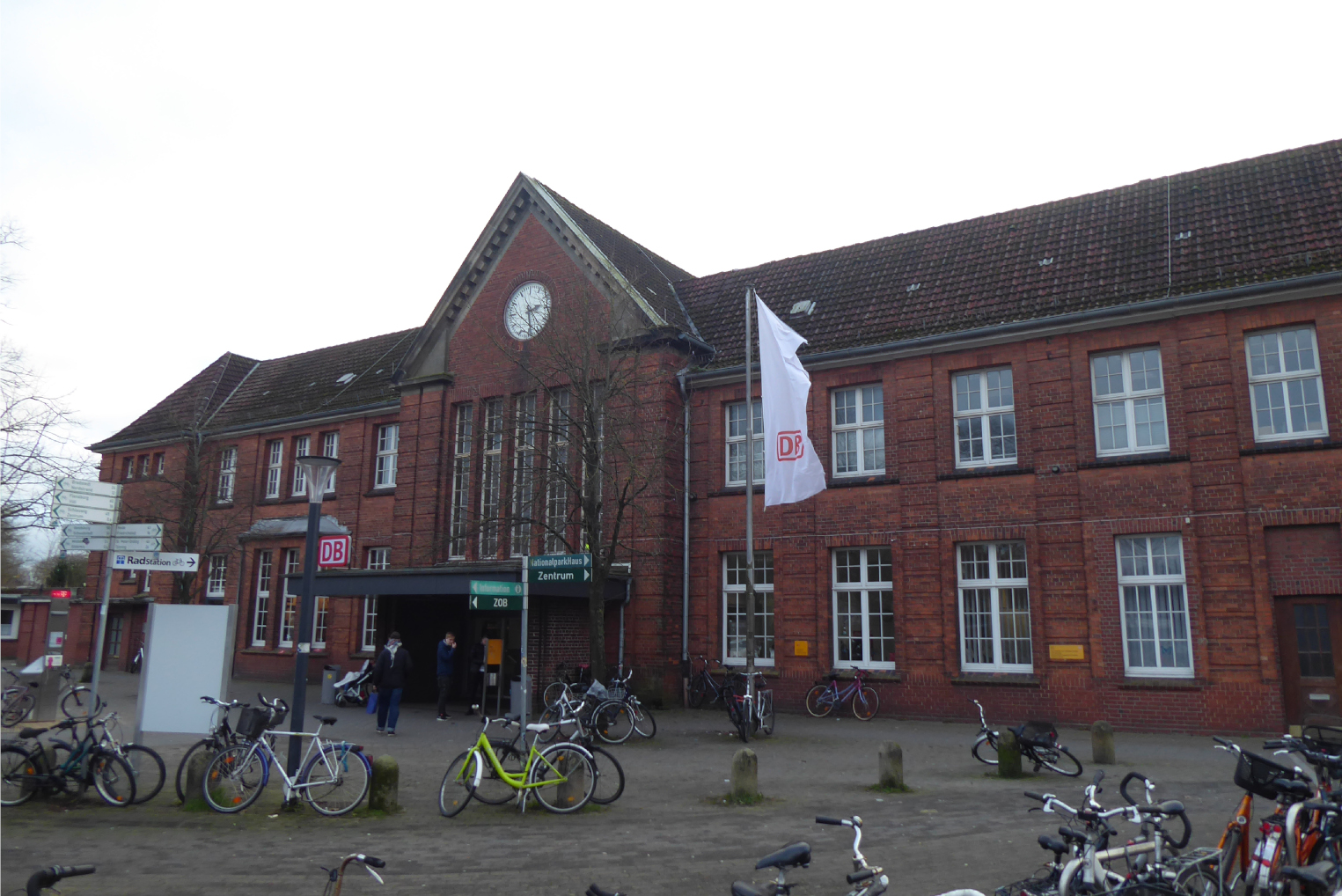

General information
- Location: Husum, Schleswig-Holstein; Germany
- Coordinates: 54°28′20″N 9°3′20″E
- Owner: Deutsche Bahn
- Operator: DB Station&Service
- Lines: Marsh Railway (KBS 130); Husum–Jübek (KBS 134); Husum–Bad St Peter (KBS 135); Husum–Erfde (closed)
- Platforms: 4

Construction
- Accessible: Yes

Other information
- Station code: 2953
- DS100 code: AHM
- IBNR: 8000181
- Category: 3
- Website: www.bahnhof.de

History
- Opened: 1 April 1854; 172 years ago

Key dates
- 1910: current building erected

Services
Preceding station	DB Fernverkehr	Following station
Niebüll towards Westerland (Sylt)	ICE 18	Heide towards Berlin Südkreuz
Niebüll towards Westerland (Sylt)	ICE 24	Heide towards Frankfurt (Main) Hbf
Niebüll towards Westerland (Sylt)	ICE 33	Heide towards Köln Hbf
Preceding station	DB Regio Nord	Following station
Bredstedt towards Westerland	RE 6	Friedrichstadt towards Hamburg-Altona
Terminus	RB 62 Limited service	Heide towards Itzehoe
Preceding station		Following station
Witzwort towards Bad St. Peter-Ording	RB 64	Terminus
Terminus	RE 74	Jübek towards Kiel Hbf
Location

Husum station is in Husum in the German state of Schleswig-Holstein. It was built in 1910 and is currently operated by Deutsche Bahn, which classifies it as a category 3 station. A less prestigious predecessor (built in 1854 and demolished in 1910) was located at the northern end of the station, another station (Husum Nord) is to the north of the current main station.

== Importance ==
The station is a railway hub, connecting the Westerland–Hamburg line (Marsh Railway) with the route to Husum–Bad St. Peter-Ording line on the Eiderstedt peninsula and the Husum–Jübek line, which connects to the Neumünster–Flensburg line and Kiel.

== Operations ==
All lines are now operated by the Nord-Ostsee-Bahn (NOB) service (now a subsidiary of Veolia Verkehr). However, some InterCity trains are operated by Deutsche Bahn. In the 2026 timetable, the following services stop at the station:

Line	Route	Frequency	Operator
ICE 18	Westerland – Niebüll – Husum – Hamburg – Berlin – Berlin Südkreuz	One train pair	DB Fernverkehr
ICE 24	Westerland – Niebüll – Husum – Hamburg – Hannover – Kassel-Wilhelmshöhe – Frankfurt (Main)	One train pair	DB Fernverkehr
ICE 33	Westerland – Niebüll – Husum – Hamburg – Bremen – Essen – Cologne	One or two train pairs	DB Fernverkehr
RE 6	Westerland (Sylt) – Niebüll – Husum – Heide – Itzehoe – Elmshorn – Hamburg-Altona	Hourly	DB Regio Nord
RE 74	Husum – Jübek – Schleswig – Owschlag – Rendsburg – Kiel	Hourly	nordbahn
RB 64	Husum – Tönning – Bad St Peter-Ording	Hourly	nordbahn

=== Platforms ===
The station has several platform tracks, but only four of them have a platform that is in use. Trains leave as follows:

- Platform track 1: regional trains to and from Kiel
- Platform track 3: regional trains to and from Bad St. Peter-Ording, regional trains to and from Kiel
- Platform track 4: long distance and Regional trains to Westerland
- Platform track 5: long distance and regional trains to Hamburg, regional trains to and from Bad St. Peter-Ording

All these services stop in Husum about every 30 minutes.

The two central platforms are 76 cm high. The platform on tracks 4 and 5 is 430 metres long, the one on tracks 1-3 is 360 metres long.
