= Rendsburg–Husum railway =

Railway line in Germany

Overview
- Line number: 1012

Service
- Route number: ex 132, ex 113e

Technical
- Line length: 50.1 km (31.1 mi)

The Rendsburg–Husum railway is a largely disused railway in the German state of Schleswig-Holstein from Rendsburg via Erfde to Husum.

== History ==
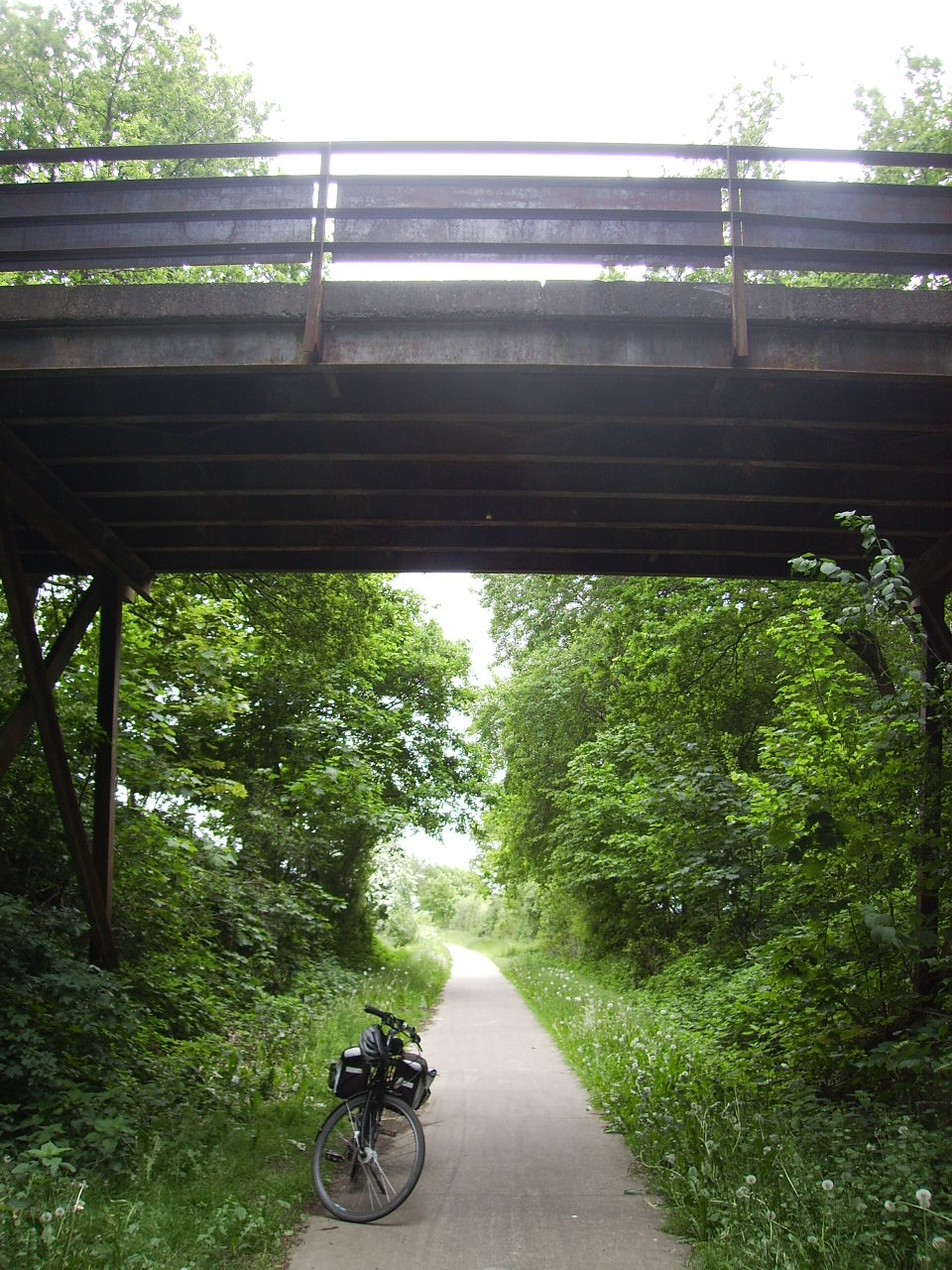
The old railway line near Norderstapel, is now used as cycle path. A farm track used to cross the line on the bridge, which is now closed.

The line running through the extensive lowland area along the Lower Eider opened on 1 September 1910. The line crossed the Schleswig District Railway's line between Friedrichstadt and Schleswig in Norderstapel until 1934. The bridge abutments of this crossing in Norderstapel are still preserved today.

In the late 1920s, there were continuous passenger services on the Husum – Erfde – Rendsburg – Kiel route, with a total running time of about three hours. A few faster services on the route took about two hours and 20 minutes. In 1959, motor coaches on the route to Rendsburg took about 70 minutes. Local trains on the Husum–Kiel route continued to operate via Erfde, while express trains were already running via Jübek. About eight pairs of trains operated daily.

On 25 May 1974, passenger services were closed from Husum to Rendsburg via Erfde. At the same time the freight operations were discontinued on the section on the line between Erfde and Hohn. The line was dismantled afterwards. The continuous link was thus reduced to freight-only sections between Husum and Erfde and between Rendsburg and Hohn. These sections were further shortened in the following decades, piece by piece. The station buildings in Norderstapel and Christiansholm were demolished shortly after passenger service ceased. The other remaining station buildings still exist today as residential buildings.

One reason for the closures was the marshy ground in the middle part of the line. Since then, all trains from Husum to Kiel run via Jübek, Schleswig and Rendsburg, adding approximately 12 km (7.5 mi) to the journey.

The route has now been largely dismantled. On 28 May 1988, freight transport between Fockbek and Hohn was closed. About 2.5 km (1.6 mi) long of the line between Rendsburg station and a northern industrial area remains, but it is also now unused. The Husum– Erfde line was closed to freight to Erfde on 24 September 1988, Schwabstedt on 27 May 1989 and to Mildstedt on 22 May 1993. It continued to operate as a siding to a timber mill in Mildstedt until 2003. A modest freight service to a sawmill in Mildstedt operated as a siding until 2003. The line terminated at a buffer stop there. Service runs were operated by the private railway company NVAG from Niebüll. Following NVAG's insolvency and the closure of the sawmill, no further rail traffic took place on this remaining section. Today, only a short stretch of the line remains, extending almost to the Husum city limits, which was occasionally used as a siding by the Nord-Ostsee-Bahn. The route of the line is still clearly visible in some sections. In Mildstedt, a signal and a wheelset stand near the former station. Southeast of Schwabstedt, the bridge over the Treene River is still standing.

In mid-2008, the city of Rendsburg purchased the approximately three-kilometer-long eastern section of the line from the connecting points in Büdelsdorf (now part of Rendsburg station) to the Fockbek town limits from DB Netz (now DB InfraGO) to ensure the connection of the town's Rendsburg-Nord industrial spur line. Finally, on 1 October 2021, AKN Eisenbahn, as the railway infrastructure manager, took over this section of the line to ensure the connection of the Rendsburg locomotive depot, which was under construction at the time.

== Plans ==
Plans exist to utilise the downtime of the new Regionalbahn line in Rendsburg for an extension beyond Rendsburg Gymnasium Kronwerk and Rendsburg-Mastbrook to Rendsburg-Seemühlen. The reactivation is estimated to cost €4 million. Projections indicate that 500 passengers per day would use the trains. An additional option exists to extend the line to Fockbek. This would require the reconstruction of the track between Rendsburg-Seemühlen and Fockbek. From 24 to 26 August 2012, from 24 to 25 August 2013, and in August 2014, special trains ran hourly between Rendsburg and Seemühlen for the Rendsburg Autumn Festival. These trains stopped at temporary stations. The total cost of this project would be approximately €380,000, of which the town of Rendsburg would have to bear approximately €155,000. The Kiel Chamber of Industry and Commerce views the recommissioning with "more than skepticism" and believes that any funding should be invested in road transport. A decision on the upgrade of the line, which would have to be paid for by the state of Schleswig-Holstein and the town of Rendsburg, had not been made by 2015. In November 2016, the Rendsburg municipal administration was instructed by the building committee to officially express interest in extending the regional train service to Hohn. The town of Rendsburg's share of the costs for the reactivation is significantly less than the funds the town would have to raise for dismantling or renovating the track infrastructure without regional rail service. This equity contribution could be fully covered by selling or leasing the line to AKN.

According to information published by the State Minister of Transport on 13 February 2020, Stadler Rail will maintain the FLIRT battery-powered multiple units in a depot yet to be built in Rendsburg on the branch line to Seemühlen. €8.5 million has been allocated for the reactivation of the 4.5 km (2.8 mi)-long line. This would allow the Mastbrook and Seemühlen stations to be built as planned in previous years. The "Rendsburg Gymnasium Kronwerk" station could become the one announced in August 2018 at the former Büdelsdorf station. Services between Rendsburg and Seemühlen are planned to begin in December 2026.
