= Schleswig station =

Railway station in Schleswig, Germany

Schleswig
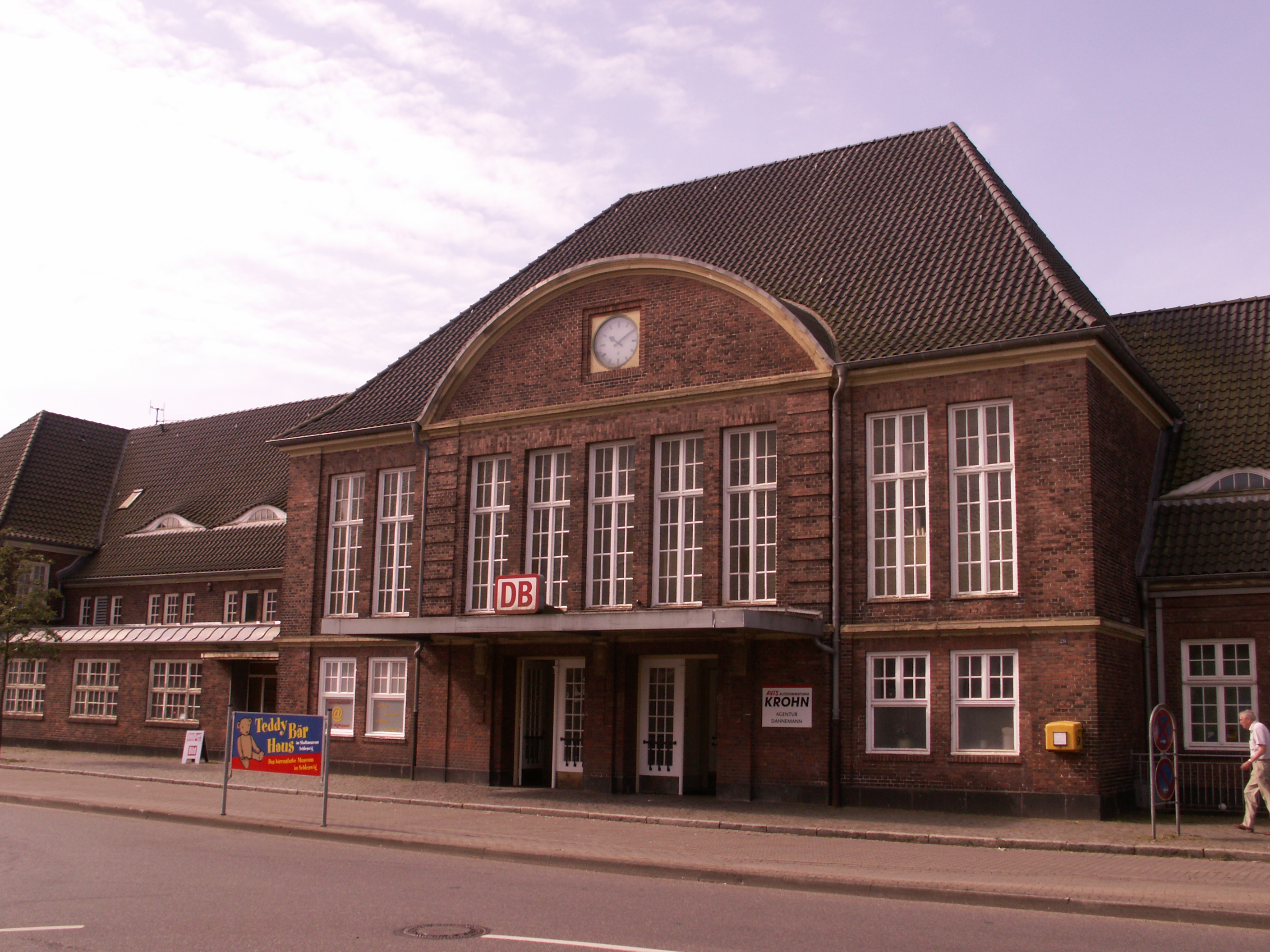

General information
- Location: Bahnhofstr. 29, Schleswig, Schleswig-Holstein; Germany
- Coordinates: 54°30′00″N 9°32′16″E
- Line: Neumünster–Flensburg line
- Platforms: 2

Construction
- Accessible: Yes

Other information
- Station code: 5588
- DS100 code: ASW
- IBNR: 8005362
- Category: 5
- Website: www.bahnhof.de

History
- Opened: 29 December 1869

Services
Preceding station	DB Fernverkehr	Following station
Flensburg towards Padborg	ICE 4 Sprinter	Neumünster towards Frankfurt Airport Regional
Padborg towards København H	RJ 27	Hamburg Hbf towards Praha hl.n.
Flensburg towards København H	ECE 75	Hamburg Hbf Terminus
Preceding station	DB Regio Nord	Following station
Jübek towards Flensburg	RE 7	Owschlag towards Hamburg Hbf
Preceding station		Following station
Jübek towards Flensburg	RE 74	Owschlag towards Kiel Hbf
Location

Schleswig station is the station of the city of Schleswig in the German state of Schleswig-Holstein. It is located on the Neumünster–Flensburg railway. It is currently operated by Deutsche Bahn, which classifies it as a category 5 station.

== History ==
Formerly, the station was connected to Schleswig Altstadt station by a three kilometre-long line of the Schleswig District Railway, which connected to lines to Satrup, Kappeln via Süderbrarup and to Friedrichstadt.

== Operations ==
In long-distance traffic, since 9 December 2007, daily Intercity-Express trains on the Aarhus–Hamburg–Berlin route have stopped in Schleswig, but this service ended in December 2015 and was replaced by EuroCity trains which continue to Copenhagen instead of Aarhus.

DB Regio Nord operates hourly Regional-Express services between Hamburg and Flensburg and Nordbahn operates services between Husum and Kiel.

In the 2026 timetable, the following services stop at the station:

Line	Route	Interval	Operator
ICE 4	Padborg – Flensburg – Schleswig – Hamburg – Hannover – Frankfurt – Frankfurt Airport regional	One train pair	DB Fernverkehr
RJ 27	Copenhagen – Schleswig – Hamburg – Berlin – Dresden – Prague	Two train pairs	DB Fernverkehr / České dráhy
ECE 75	Hamburg – Schleswig – Padborg – Kolding – Odense – Ringsted – Copenhagen	Every two hours	DB Fernverkehr / DSB
RE 7	Hamburg – Elmshorn – Neumünster – Rendsburg – Schleswig – Flensburg	Hourly	DB Regio Nord
RE 74	Husum – Jübek – Schleswig – Owschlag – Rendsburg – Felde – Kiel	Hourly	nordbahn

=== Tracks ===
The station has three tracks, two of which have a platform that is used for passenger operations. Trains operate as follows:

- Platform 1: Long-distance trains to Flensburg, RB-SH regional services to Flensburg and Husum
- Platform 3: Long-distance trains to Hamburg, RB-SH regional services to Hamburg and Kiel
