= Niebüll station =

Railway station in Niebüll, Germany

Niebüll Naibel
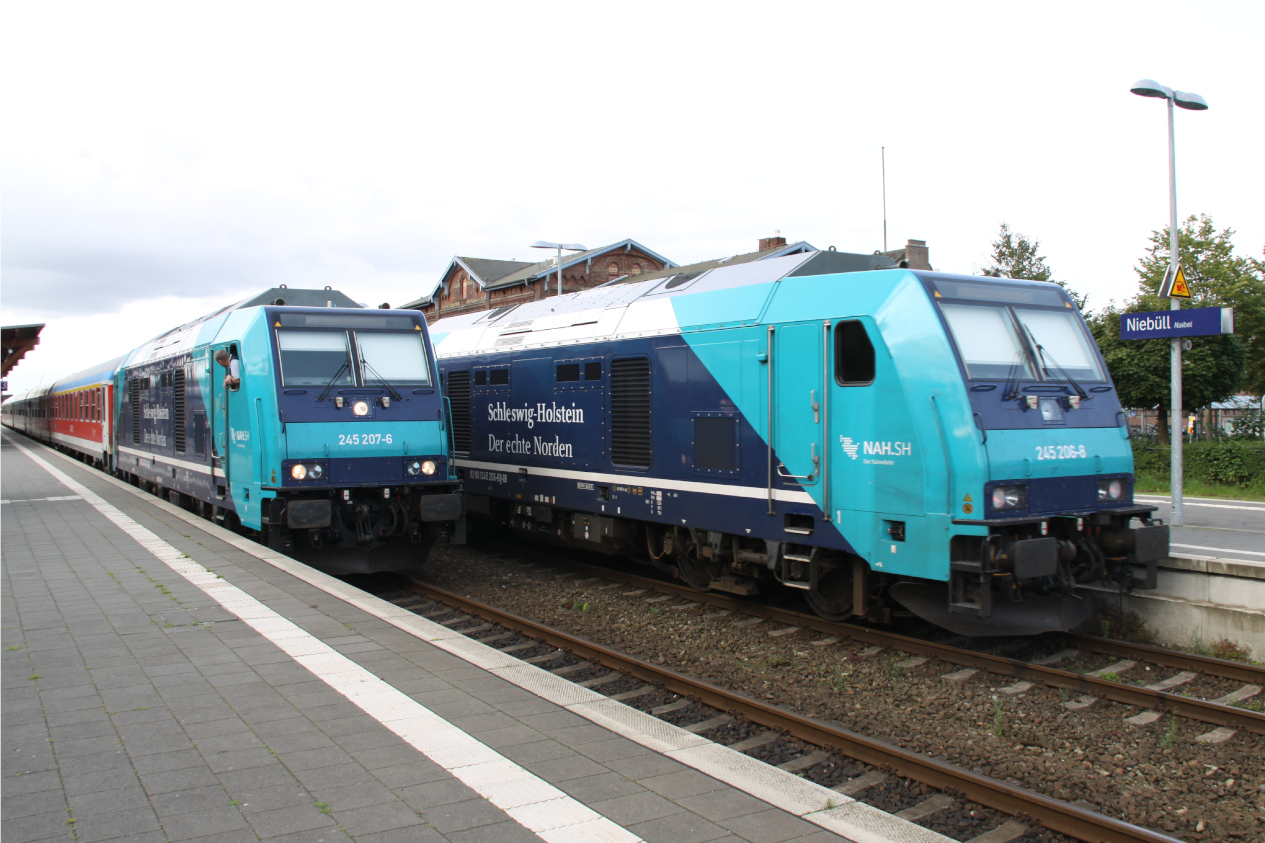
- Niebüll railway station

General information
- Location: Bahnhofstraße 1; 25899 Niebüll, Schleswig-Holstein; Germany
- Coordinates: 54°47′20″N 8°50′03″E
- Owner: Deutsche Bahn
- Operator: DB Station&Service
- Lines: Marsh Railway (Westerland-Elmshorn); Niebüll–Dagebüll railway Marsh Railway (Tønder–Niebüll)
- Platforms: 4

Construction
- Accessible: Yes

Other information
- Website: www.bahnhof.de

History
- Opened: 1887
Services
Preceding station	DB Fernverkehr	Following station
Westerland (Sylt) Terminus	ICE 18	Husum towards Berlin Südkreuz
Westerland (Sylt) Terminus	ICE 24	Husum towards Frankfurt (Main) Hbf
Westerland (Sylt) Terminus	ICE 33	Husum towards Köln Hbf
Preceding station	DB Regio Nord	Following station
Klanxbüll towards Westerland (Sylt)	RE 6	Langenhorn towards Hamburg-Altona
Klanxbüll towards Westerland (Sylt)	RE 60	Husum towards Hamburg-Altona
Preceding station	Norddeutsche Eisenbahn Niebüll	Following station
Terminus	RB 66	Uphusum towards Toender st
Location

Niebüll (German: Bahnhof Niebüll) is a railway station serving the town of Niebüll in the state of Schleswig-Holstein in Northern Germany. The station lies on the Marsh Railway and the train services are operated by Deutsche Bahn and Norddeutsche Eisenbahn.

== Train services ==
In the 2026 timetable, the following services stop at the station:

Line	Route	Frequency	Operator
ICE 18	Westerland – Niebüll – Hamburg – Berlin – Berlin Südkreuz	One train pair	DB Fernverkehr
ICE 24	Westerland – Niebüll – Hamburg – Hanover – Kassel-Wilhelmshöhe – Frankfurt	One train pair	DB Fernverkehr
ICE 33	Westerland – Niebüll – Hamburg – Bremen – Essen – Cologne	One or two train pairs	DB Fernverkehr
RE 6 / RE 60	Westerland – Niebüll – Husum – Heide (Holst) – Itzehoe – Elmshorn – Hamburg-Altona	Hourly, half hourly in the peak	DB Regio Nord
RB 66	Niebüll – Tønder – Esbjerg	Hourly or 2 hourly	Norddeutsche Eisenbahn Niebüll

== Gallery ==
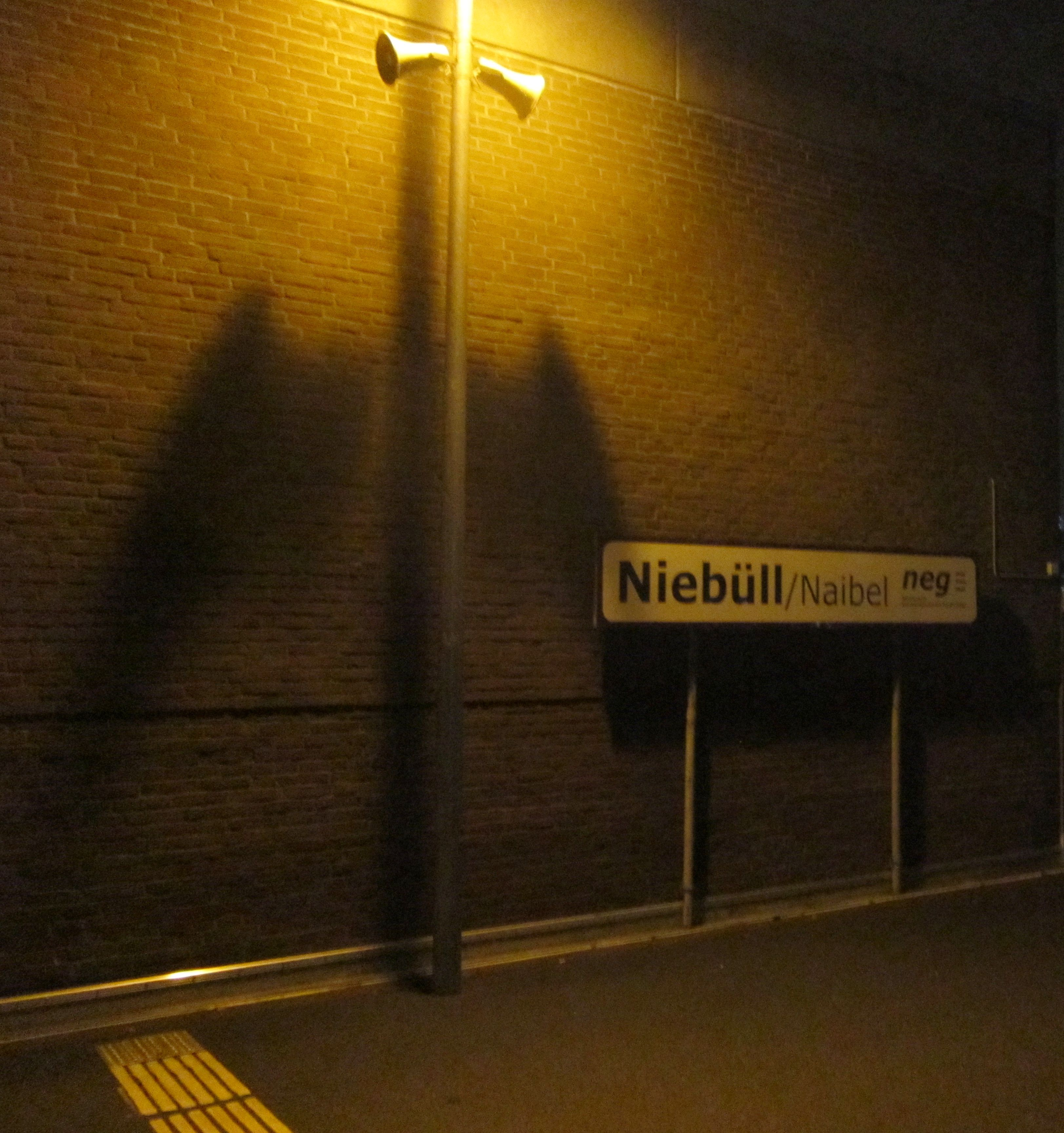
Bilingual station sign

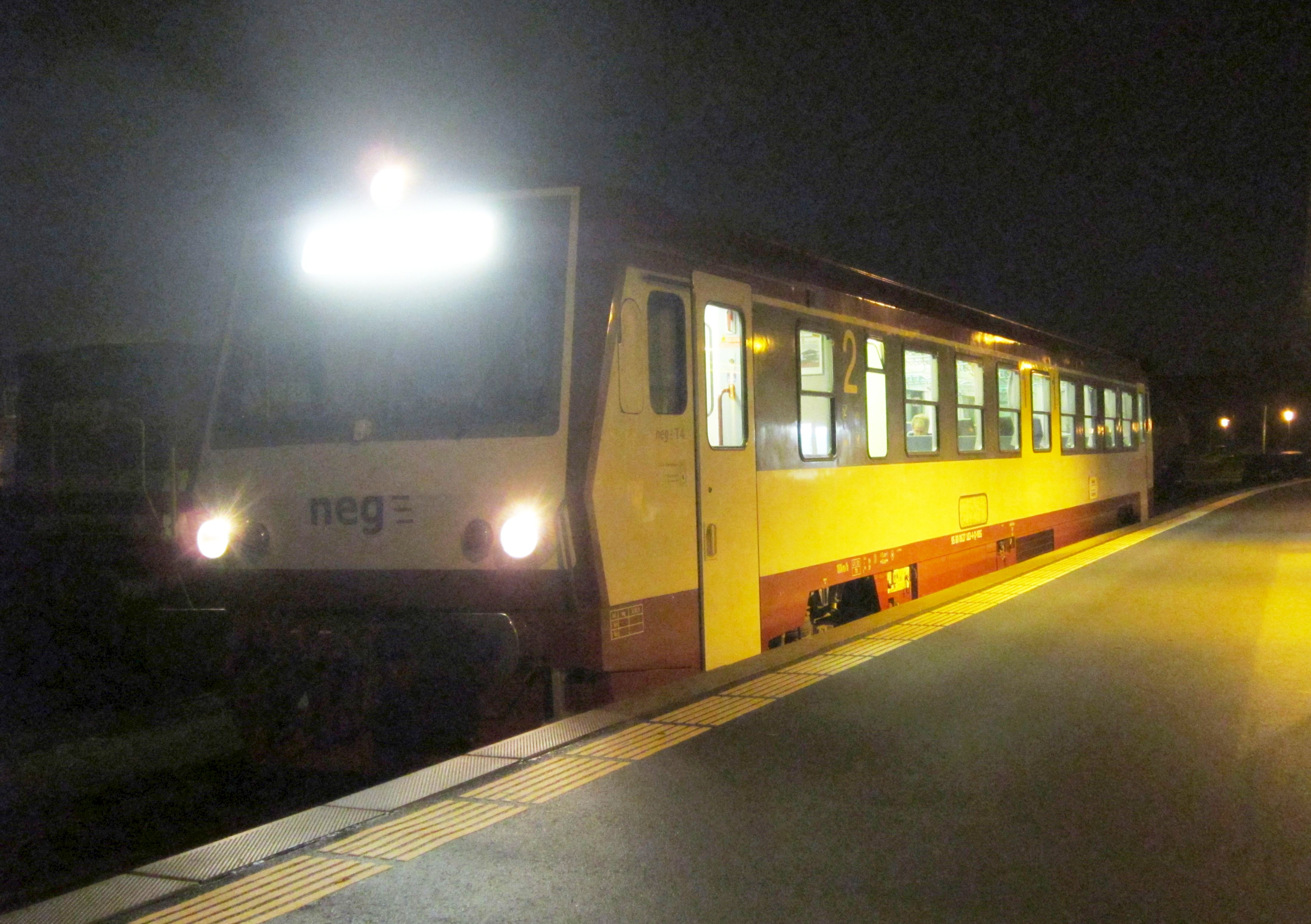
neg train to Dagebüll
