= Rendsburg Loop =

Spiral railway in Rendsburg, Germany

Coordinates: 54°18′08″N 9°41′26″E

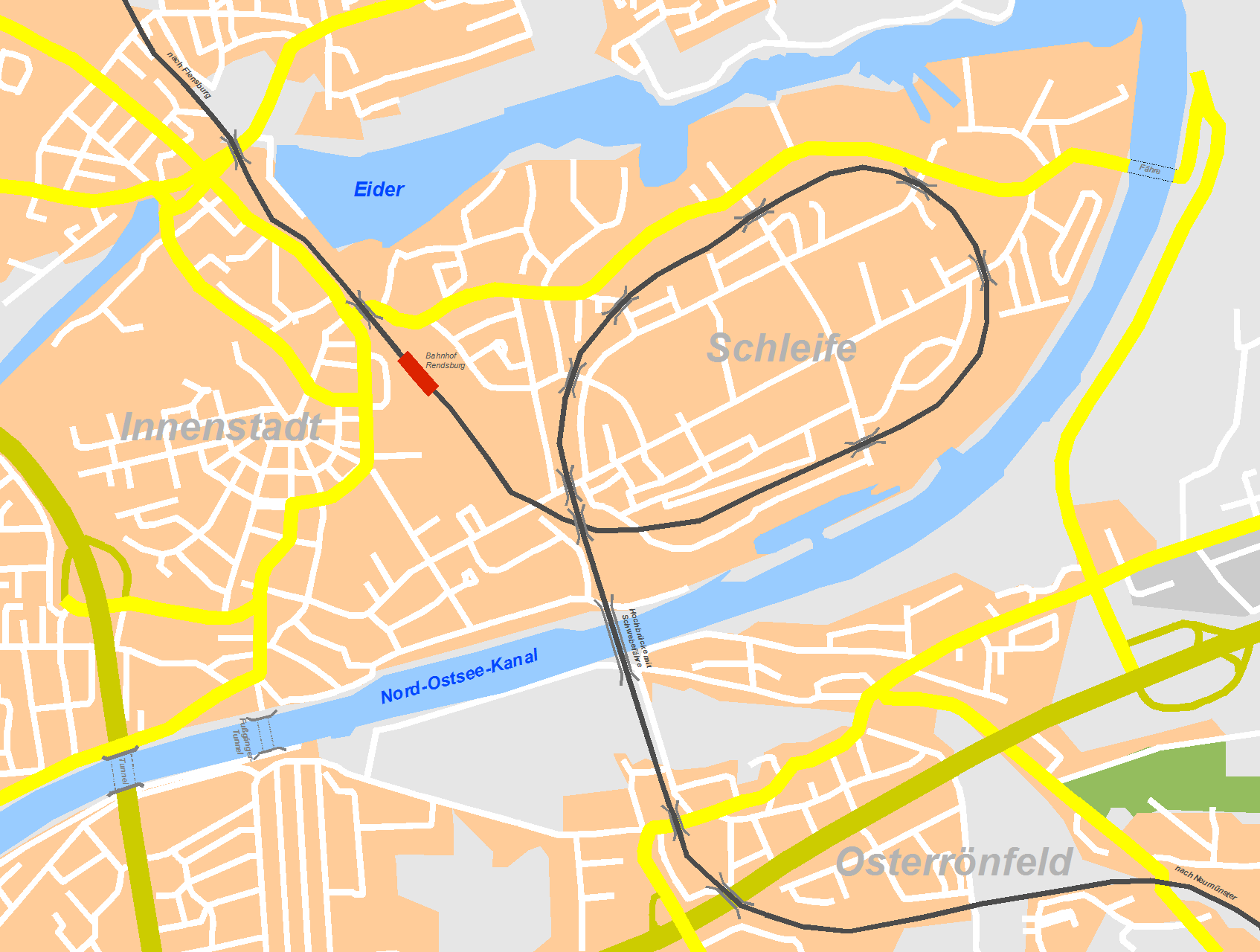
Map of the loop

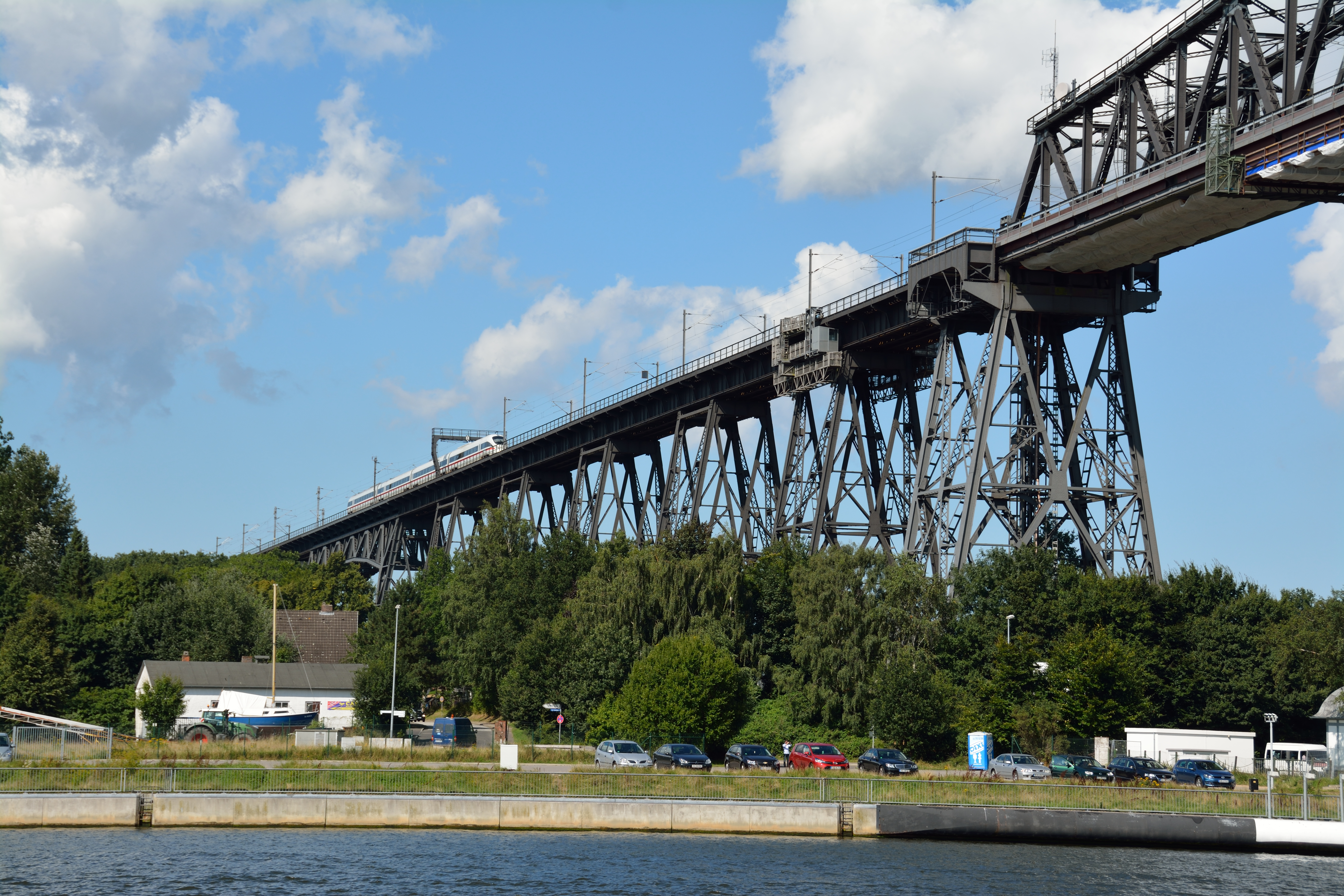
Train on the Rendsburg Loop

The Rendsburg Loop (German: Rendsburger Schleife) is an elevated spiral railway in Rendsburg in the German state of Schleswig-Holstein. A 4.5-kilometre elliptical loop, it connects the Rendsburg High Bridge over the Kiel Canal on the Neumünster–Flensburg line to Rendsburg station.

== Construction ==
The first bridge built over the original Kiel Canal in the 1890s was a swing bridge. In 1913, with the widening of the canal, this was replaced by the Rendsburg High Bridge with a clearance height of 42 metres (138 ft). This met the requirements for bridges across the canal. At the same time, however, it was desirable for trains to be able to use the existing Rendsburg station. This was difficult, because the station was too close to the canal to be connected directly from a bridge over the canal at the minimum height for the bridge. Therefore, at the northern end of the bridge, an elevated railway was built in the form of a loop. Trains from the south to Rendsburg need to make a 360-degree turn before entering the station. Similarly, trains coming from the north after leaving Rendsburg station run over the loop on to the High Bridge to cross the Kiel Canal.

== Schleife district ==
The district of Rendsburg that developed inside and around the loop is named Schleife after the loop.

== Notable people ==
- Rainer (Charly) Beutin, blues band leader and former resident directly within the loop
