= Rendsburg High Bridge =

Rendsburg High Bridge Rendsburger Hochbrücke
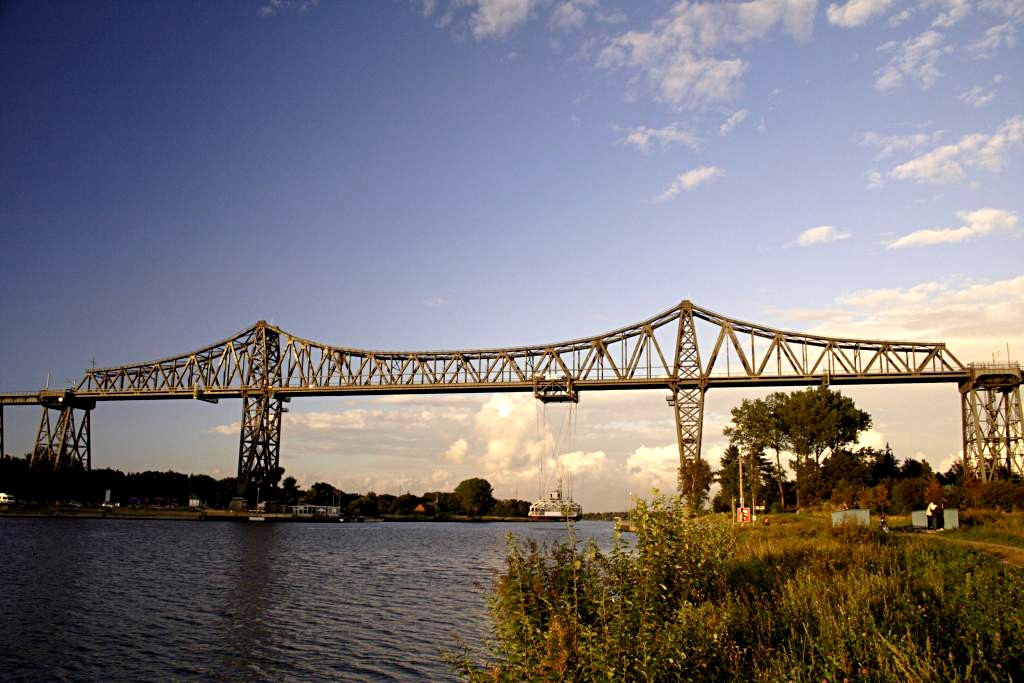
- Main span of the Rendsburg High Bridge
- Coordinates: 54°17′36.94″N 9°40′58.45″E
- Crosses: Kiel Canal
- Locale: Rendsburg, Germany
- Official name: Eisenbahnhochbrücke Rendsburg

Characteristics
- Design: Cantilever bridge
- Material: Steel
- Total length: 2,486 metres (8,156 ft)
- Height: 68 metres (223 ft)
- Longest span: 140 metres (460 ft)
- Piers in water: None
- Clearance above: 42 metres (138 ft)

History
- Designer: Friedrich Voss
- Construction start: 1911
- Construction end: 1913

Location
- Interactive map of Rendsburg High Bridge

The Rendsburg High Bridge (German: Rendsburger Hochbrücke, officially Eisenbahnhochbrücke Rendsburg) is a railway viaduct on the Neumünster–Flensburg line that also serves as a transporter bridge. The bridge crosses the Kiel Canal at Rendsburg in the German state of Schleswig-Holstein. It is federally owned through the Federal Water and Navigation Administration that also owns and runs the canal.

== Previous history ==
The Kiel Canal (then Kaiser-Wilhelm-Kanal) was built between 1887 and 1895 cutting through existing traffic lines, including the railway line between Neumünster and Flensburg, for which two parallel swing bridges were built. In 1907 it was decided to enlarge the canal, and in the course of this expansion major obstacles were also to be removed.

Main railway lines had right of way over ships on the canal and ships had to stop, losing about half an hour when a train passed. This was considered the major obstacle as the ships were unable to overtake and could pass each other at dedicated enlarged areas so that the traffic on the entire canal was hampered. Especially the navy pressed for a separation of traffic flows as closed bridges could delay flotillas by several hours.

In order to allow the railway line to pass above the canal, the new bridge was to have a clearance of 42 metres (138 ft) over the canal's mean water level. The existing tracks crossed the canal about 7 metres (23 ft) above the canal's water level, so the tracks had to be elevated by about 36.5 metres (120 ft) including an additional 1.5 metres (4 ft 11 in) to accommodate the thickness of the lower girder. The required maximum incline of 1:150 (a one-unit gain in altitude for every 150 units in horizontal distance) made it necessary to build elevated embankments and access bridges of about 5.5 km (3.4 mi) at each side.

== Design and construction ==
The bridge was erected between 1911 and 1913 to a design by Friedrich Voss (1872–1953) and replaced the earlier swing bridges.

The steel viaduct has a length of 2,486 metres (8,156 ft) and is supplemented by embankments that bring the overall length of the structure to about 7.5 kilometres (4.7 mi). The cantilever main bridge is 317 metres (1,040 ft) long, has a main span of 140 metres (460 ft) and provides a clearance of 42 metres (138 ft) above the canal's water level.

To serve Rendsburg station, situated at ground level only a couple of hundred metres from the main bridge, the railway line is routed through a large 360-degree loop on the north bank of the canal ("Rendsburg Loop").

The total cost of the construction, including the relocation of railway lines but excluding work related to the elevation of Rendsburg station, was 13.4 million Mark. This figure includes 5.7 million Mark for bridges, 2.7 million Mark for the mounds and 1.3 million Mark for underpasses and the relocation of roads.

== Transporter bridge ==
The "Schwebefähre" (suspension ferry) runs daily every 15 minutes from early morning until late at night. It covers a distance of 125 metres (410 ft) within 1½ minutes and provides the shortest connection between the municipality of Osterrönfeld and the city of Rendsburg. As this means of transportation is especially useful to students on their way to school, larger maintenance work that requires suspension of service is coordinated with school holidays.

The gondola is fourteen metres long and six metres wide, and travels six metres above the canal. In recent years the nominal transport capacity has been reduced from six to four automobiles in order to factor in increased car size and weight. While the gondola is equipped with nautical equipment such as radio, radar and life-rafts, there is no prerequisite for the operator to hold a master's licence for inland navigation.

During a storm in January 1993, the unmanned and unlit gondola's brakes could not withstand the wind force and it slowly rolled towards the middle of the canal, where it collided with a ship's mast and crane. Both ship and gondola suffered only minor damage.

On 8 January 2016 the gondola of the transporter bridge collided with general cargo ship Evert Prahm and was heavily damaged. It was demounted and moved to a shipyard on 15 March 2016 for damage assessment, but was found to be irreparably damaged. Construction of its replacement began in April 2020 and service officially resumed on 4 March 2022. The new transporter bridge was designed to resemble the old one and is equipped with modern technology.

In summer 2024, the old gondola was saved from being dismantled by the purchase of the Rendsburg businessman Martin Sick. It is to be preserved as a tourist landmark in the region. Since the SH Netz Cup rowing regatta in summer 2025, there has been a restaurant and cultural events on the canal bank within sight of the new transporter bridge.

== See also ==
- List of bridges in Germany
- Rendsburg Loop
- Kiel Canal

== Gallery ==
The hanging ferry, video

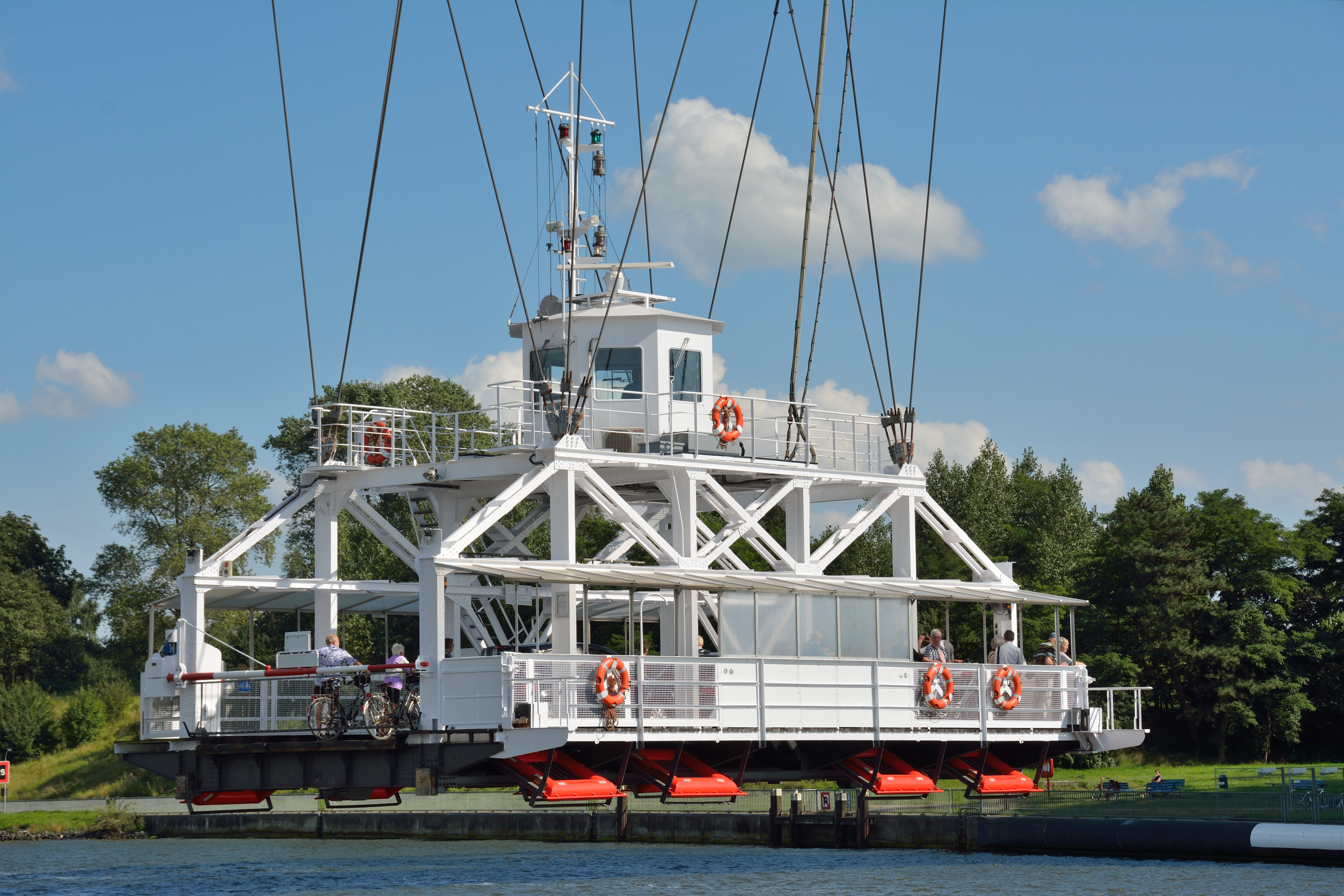
The hanging ferry under the bridge span

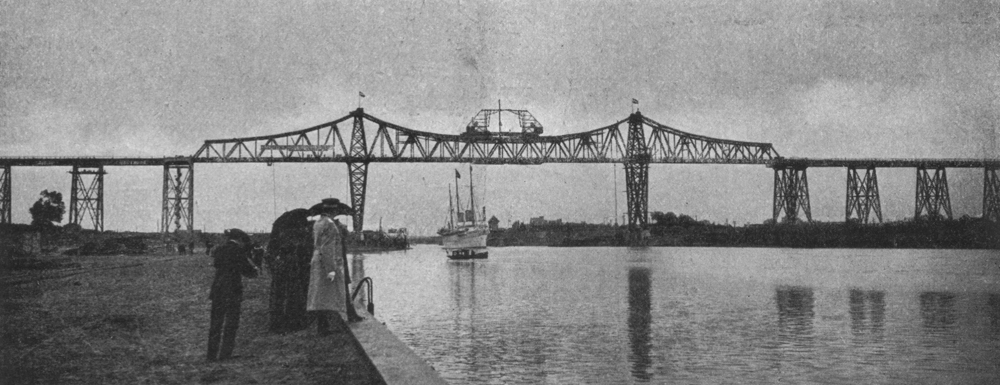
The bridge in 1913 about to be opened
