= Nordbahn Eisenbahngesellschaft =

Railway company based in Hamburg, Germany

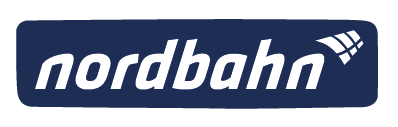
Logo of Nordbahn Eisenbahngesellschaft

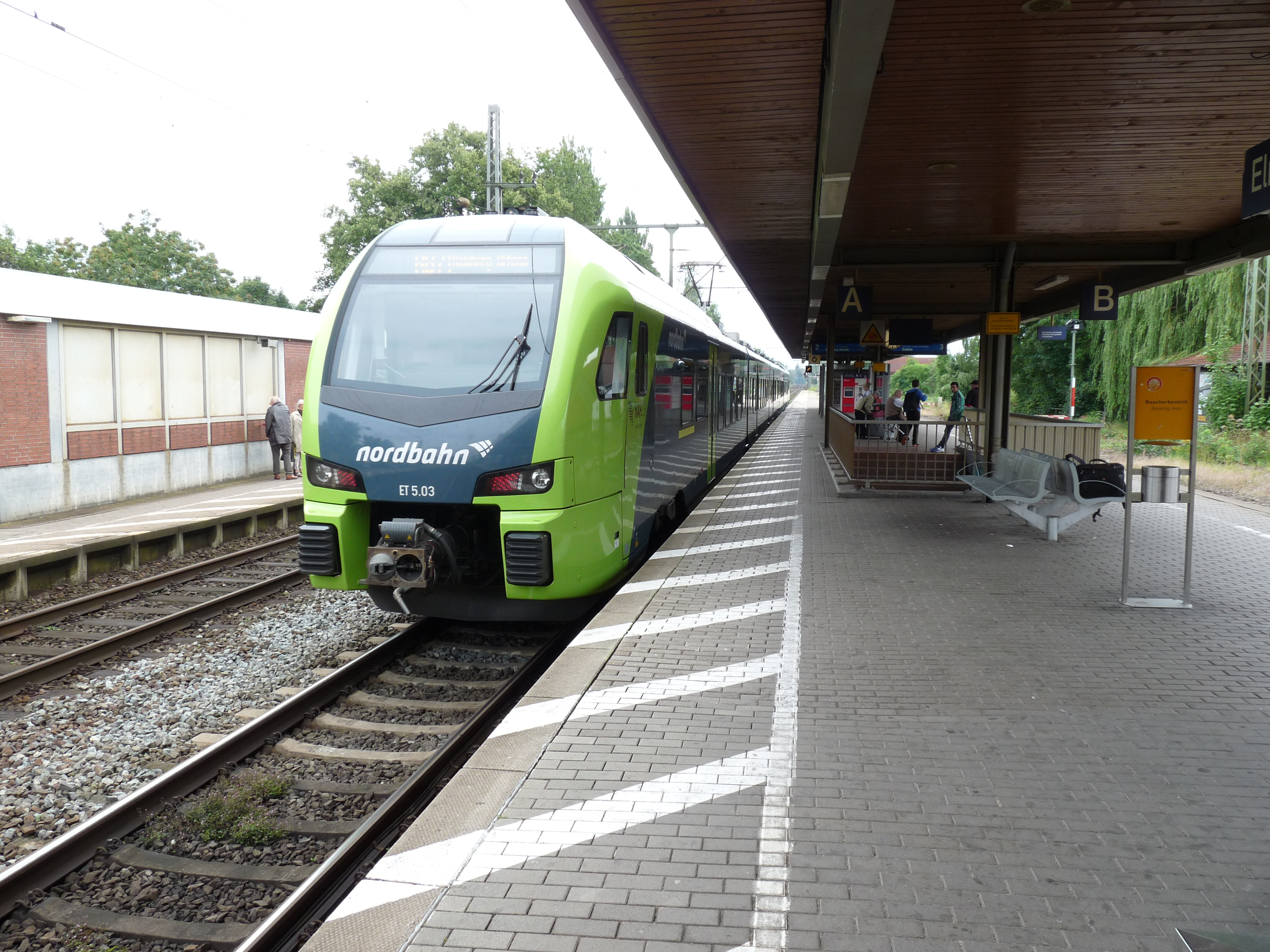
Stadler FLIRT of Nordbahn Eisenbahngesellschaft in Elmshorn station in 2015.

The NBE Nordbahn Eisenbahngesellschaft mbh & Co. KG (NBE Nordbahn Railway Company) is a German non-state-owned railway company based in Hamburg since December 2002. It is a subsidiary company of BeNEX and AKN Eisenbahn. The company is exclusively for passenger transport and operates services on the Hamburg–Itzehoe, Neumünster–Büsum, Hamburg-Altona–Wrist and Neumünster–Bad Oldesloe routes.

== Network ==
In December 2002, traffic began on the approximately 45 km (28 mi)-long Neumünster–Bad Oldesloe railway (RB 82). In September 2009, Nordbahn retained the contract on its existing route in a tender and also won the contract for the Neumünster–Heide – Büsum route (RB 63), which had previously been operated by its parent company AKN under the brand name Schleswig-Holstein-Bahn. Both lines have been operated since 11 December 2011 for an initial period of ten years. These routes are regularly operated with LINT 41 vehicles. The vehicles are maintained in the AKN workshops in Kaltenkirchen and Neumünster Süd.

In April 2012, Nordbahn won the tender for the operation of the two Regionalbahn lines from Itzehoe and Wrist to Hamburg Hauptbahnhof and Hamburg-Altona, as well as some Regional-Express reinforcements between Itzehoe and Hamburg-Altona, starting in December 2014 for 13 years. This was Lot B of the central tender network.

The contract for the continued operation of the RB 63 and RB 82 lines in the period from 2023 to 2035, the central lot of the battery network, was awarded to Nordbahn in February 2021. The LINT type vehicles will be replaced by FLIRT battery-powered railcars from the manufacturer Stadler provided by the state. In December 2021, Nordbahn was also awarded the contract for the northern lot. This had originally been awarded to the railway company RDC, but the Schleswig Higher Regional Court (OLG) rejected this for technical reasons. DB Regio had appealed to the OLG.

== Contracted routes ==
Line	Route	Contract period	Rollingstock
RE 6 (some services only)	Hamburg-Altona – Elmshorn – Itzehoe	12/2014 – 12/2027	Stadler FLIRT 3
RB 61	Hamburg Hbf – Pinneberg – Elmshorn – Glückstadt – Krempe – Itzehoe	12/2014 – 12/2027	Stadler FLIRT 3
RB 63	Neumünster– Hohenwestedt – Hademarschen – Heide – Büsum	12/2023 – 12/2035	Stadler FLIRT battery
RB 64	Husum – Tönning – St. Peter Ording	12/2023 – 12/2035	Stadler FLIRT battery
RB 71	Hamburg-Altona – Pinneberg – Elmshorn – Wrist (– Kellinghusen probably from 2025)/ – Itzehoe	12/2014 – 12/2027	Stadler FLIRT 3
RE 72 RE 72	Kiel Hbf – Gettorf – Eckernförde – Süderbrarup – Flensburg	12/2023 – 12/2035	Stadler FLIRT battery
RB 73	Kiel Hbf – Kiel-Hassee CITTI-PARK – Gettorf – Eckernförde	12/2023 – 12/2035	Stadler FLIRT battery
RE 74	Kiel Hbf – Felde – Rendsburg – Schleswig – Jübek – Husum	12/2023 – 12/2035	Stadler FLIRT battery
RB 75	Kiel Hbf – Felde – Rendsburg (– Rendsburg-Seemühlen planned)	12/2023 – 12/2035	Stadler FLIRT battery
RB 82	Neumünster – Bad Segeberg – Bad Oldesloe	12/2002 – 12/2011; 12/2011 – 12/2023; 12/2023 – 12/2035	Stadler FLIRT battery

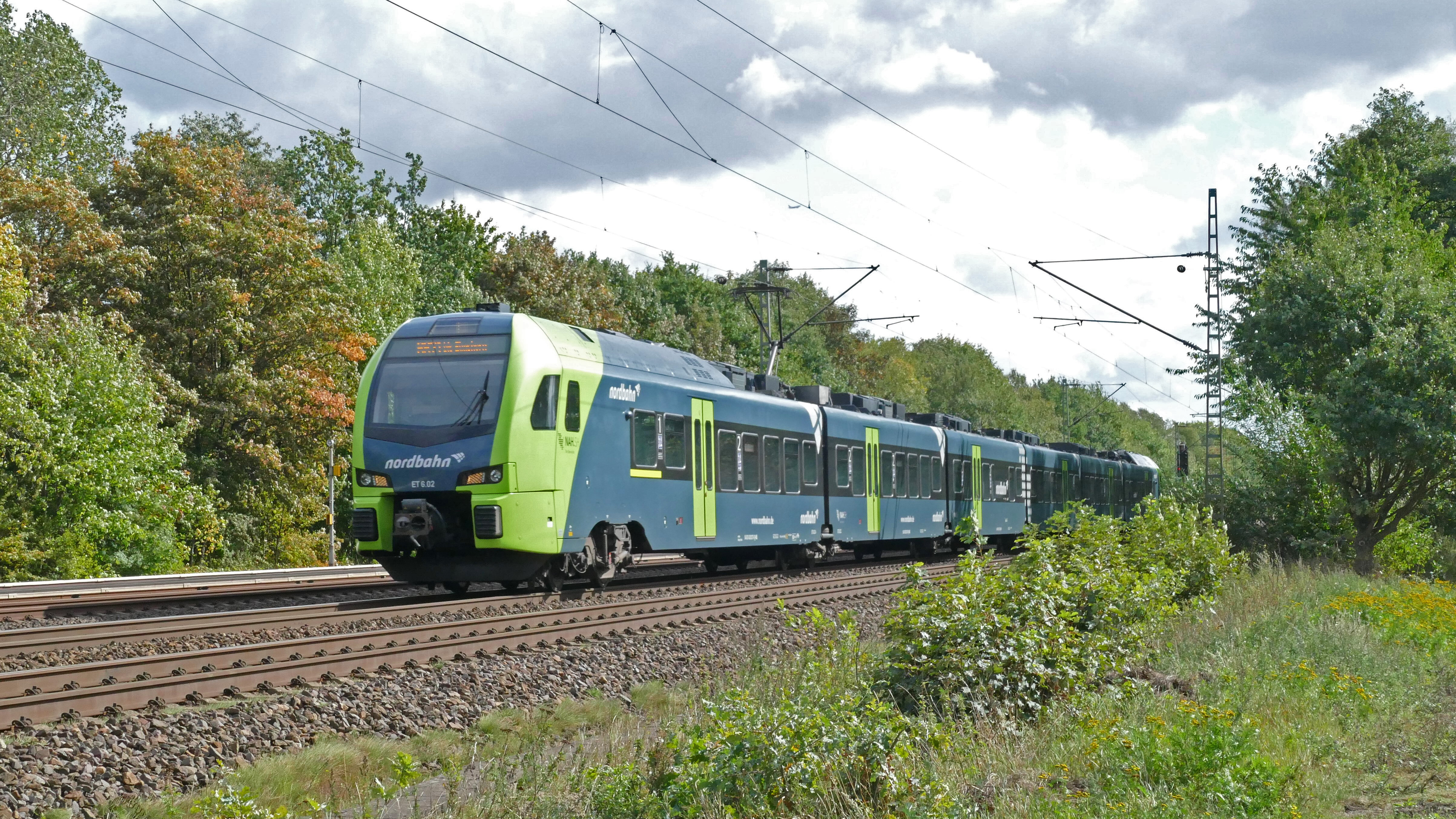
A FLIRT 3 set of Nordbahn near Krupunder

== Rollingstock ==
The Nordbahn railway company leases 7 Alstom Coradia Lint 41 vehicles from the AKN, which are used on the Büsum – Neumünster and Neumünster – Bad Oldesloe routes. These are maintained by the AKN in Kaltenkirchen and in Neumünster Süd.

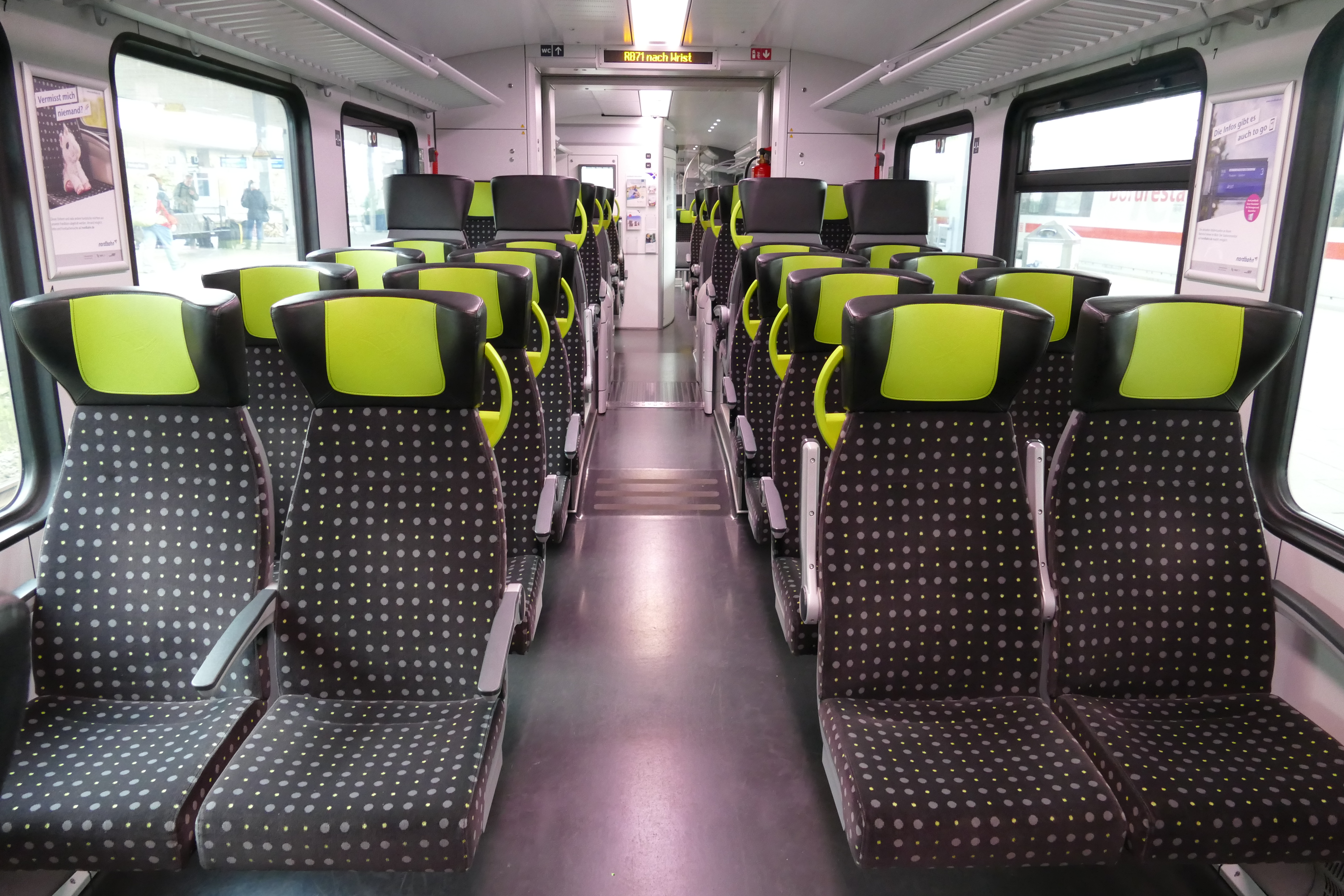
Interior of a FLIRT railcar of the Nordbahn in 2nd class

Newly purchased Stadler FLIRT 3 electric multiple units are used on regional railway lines 61 and 71 (Schleswig-Holstein Central Network Lot B).

There are eight six-car units with 320 seats and eight five-car units with up to 259 seats. The trains are based in the Hamburg-Tiefstack workshop and are maintained there. The railcars have a very high proportion of low floors, barrier-free access with gap bridges or sliding steps at each entrance door, are fully air-conditioned, have a barrier-free vacuum toilet system, a modern passenger information system and power sockets in first class. The maximum permitted speed is 160 km/h (99 mph).

Stadler FLIRT battery-powered railcars have been operating on the RB 63, RB 64, RB 72, RB 73, RB 74, RB 75 and RB 82 lines since 2024. These are leased from the Paribus company and are painted in the NAH.SH design.

The Alstom Coradia Lint 41 vehicles were returned to the AKN.
