= Itzehoe station =

Railway station in Itzehoe, Germany

Itzehoe
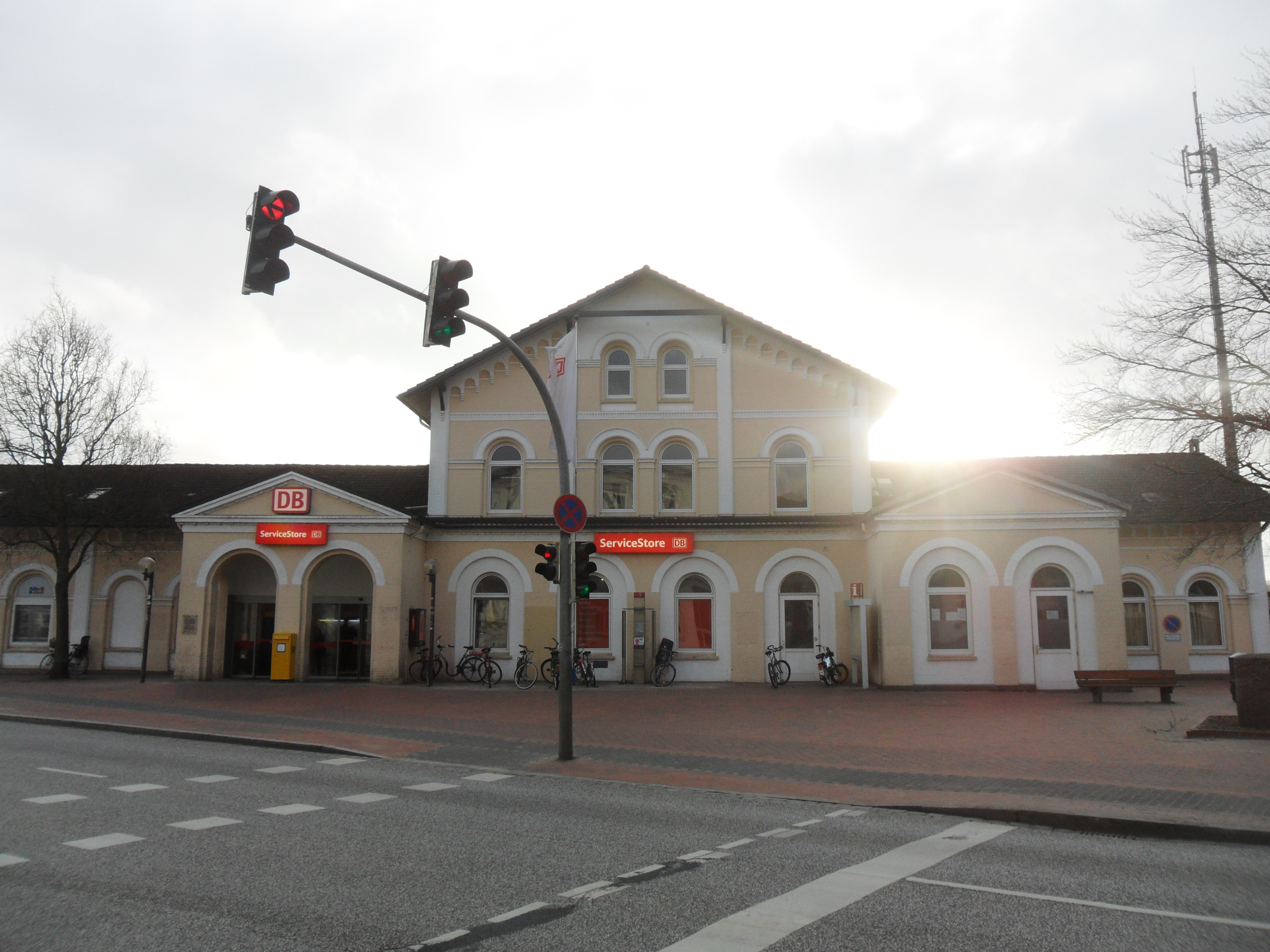

General information
- Location: Bahnhofstr. 32, Itzehoe, Schleswig-Holstein; Germany
- Coordinates: 53°55′27″N 9°30′38″E
- Lines: Elmshorn–Westerland (23 km) (KBS 130); Itzehoe-Wrist (0.0 km) (closed); Itzehoe Port Railway (0.0 km) (closed)
- Platforms: 4

Construction
- Accessible: Yes

Other information
- Station code: 3016
- DS100 code: AIZ
- IBNR: 8003102
- Category: 3
- Website: www.bahnhof.de

History
- Opened: 1 November 1878; 147 years ago
- Electrified: 29 May 1998; 28 years ago

Passengers
- 4,000

Services
| Preceding station | DB Fernverkehr | Following station |
|---|---|---|
| Heide (Holst) towards Westerland (Sylt) | ICE 18 | Hamburg Hbf towards Berlin Südkreuz |
| Heide (Holst) towards Westerland (Sylt) | ICE 24 | Hamburg Hbf towards Frankfurt (Main) Hbf |
| Heide (Holst) towards Westerland (Sylt) | ICE 33 | Hamburg Hbf towards Köln Hbf |
| Preceding station | DB Regio Nord | Following station |
| Heide (Holst) towards Westerland (Sylt) | RE 6 | Elmshorn towards Hamburg-Altona |
| Wilster towards Heide (Holst) | RB 62 | Terminus |
| Preceding station | | Following station |
| Terminus | RB 61 | Kremperheide towards Hamburg Hbf |
| Terminus | RB 71 | Kremperheide towards Hamburg-Altona |
Location

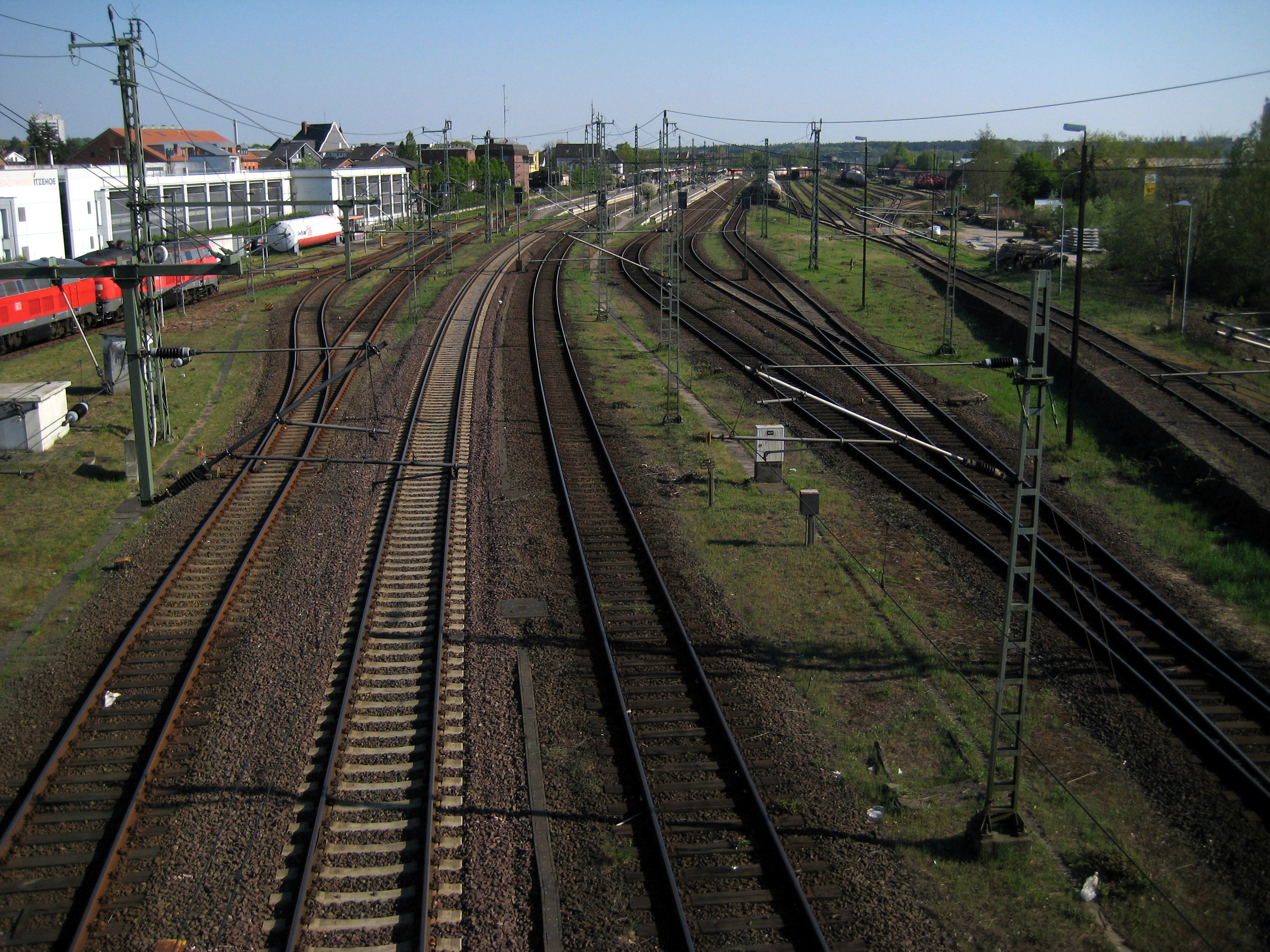
View over the tracks, on the left is the location of the former Itzehoe workshop, on the right is the hump

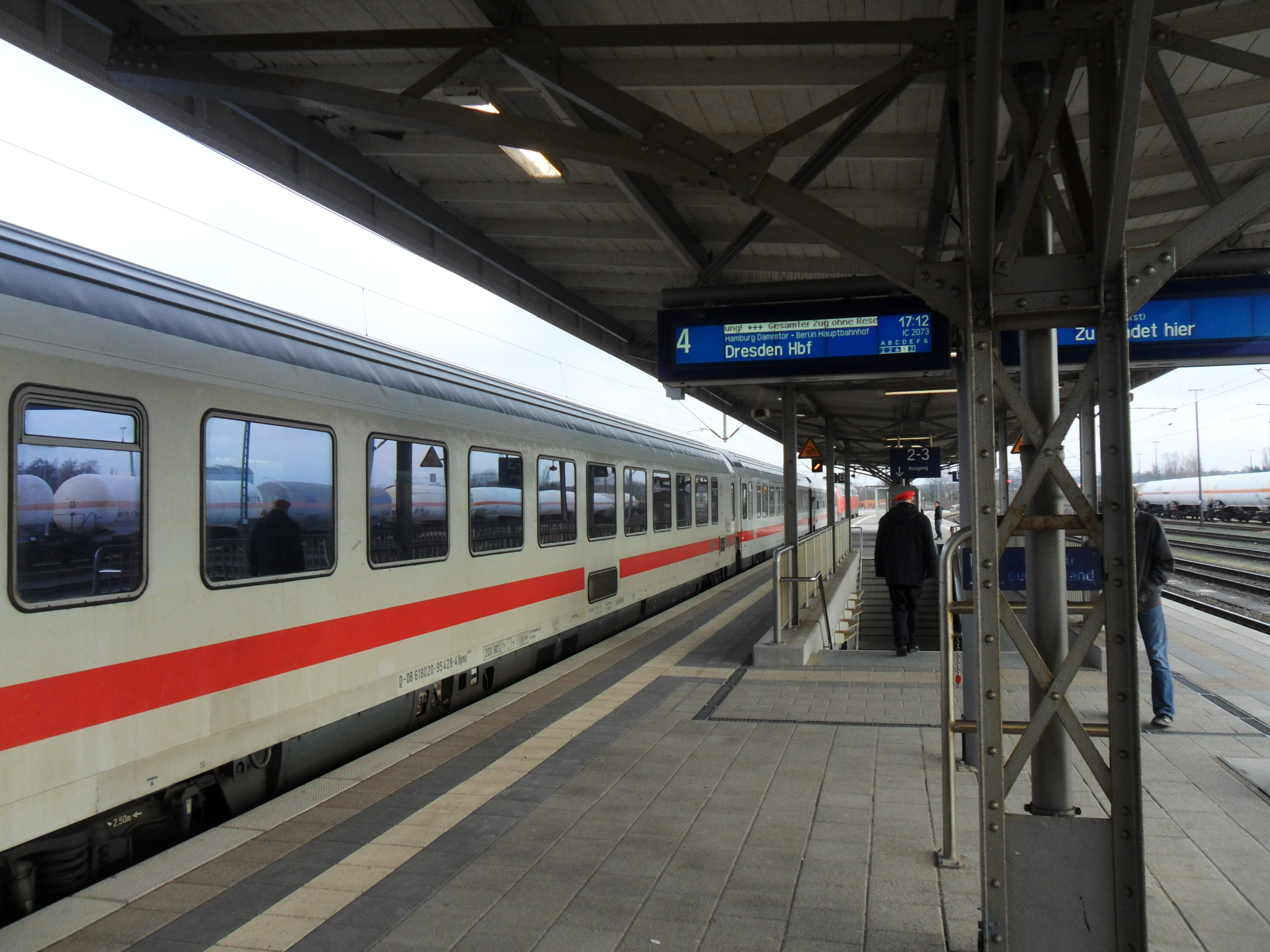
Intercity to Dresden Hbf

Itzehoe station is a railway station in the town of Itzehoe in the German state of Schleswig-Holstein. It is located on the Marsh Railway, which is electrified from Elmshorn up to this point. It is classified by Deutsche Bahn as a category 3 station.

== History ==
The first Itzehoe station was located on the southern side of the Stör on land later used by a cement factory. During the extension of the Marsh Railway to Heide in 1878, the second station was built in the town, including the current station building. At that time, Brückenstrasse crossed the line over a wooden bridge at the northern end of the station. During the extension of the line through the town to Wilster four level crossings were built, which were abolished in 1931 with the realignment along the current route. With the opening of the new line to Wrist in 1889, these crossings had become more inconvenient. A workshop was probably built at the northern exit from the station during the building of the branch line.

The contact wire for the electrification of the line reached Itzehoe on 29 May 1998. But the use of electric rollingstock was only introduced after the intervention of the State of Schleswig-Holstein, which had funded the electrification.

== Operations ==
Regionalbahn services of Schleswig-Holstein from Hamburg-Altona and Pinneberg via Elmshorn begin and end In Itzehoe. The DB Regio Nord service from Hamburg-Altona to Westerland (Sylt) via Husum makes a stop in Itzehoe, as does the service to Heide. Deutsche Bahn Intercity trains (IC) also stop in Itzehoe and connect the city directly to Stuttgart, Berlin and Köln or in the opposite direction to Westerland or Dagebüll Mole. In the 2026 timetable, the following services stop at the station:

| Train class | Route | Operator |
|---|---|---|
| ICE 18 | Westerland – Niebüll – Itzehoe – Hamburg – Berlin – Berlin Südkreuz | DB Fernverkehr |
| ICE 24 | Westerland – Niebüll – Itzehoe – Hamburg – Hanover – Kassel-Wilhelmshöhe – Frankfurt (Main) | DB Fernverkehr |
| ICE 33 | Westerland – Niebüll – Itzehoe – Hamburg – Bremen – Essen – Cologne | DB Fernverkehr |
| RE 6 | Itzehoe – Elmshorn – Pinneberg – Hamburg-Altona | DB Regio Nord |
| RB 61 | Itzehoe – Glückstadt – Elmshorn – Pinneberg – Hamburg | nordbahn |
| RB 62 | Itzehoe – St Michaelisdonn – Heide | DB Regio Nord |
| RB 71 | Itzehoe – Glückstadt – Elmshorn – Pinneberg – Hamburg-Altona | nordbahn |

Itzehoe station has four platform tracks. The track next to the station building is called track 2 and is used by Regionalbahn services. RE and IC trains to Westerland stop on track 3. RE services to Hamburg-Altona and IC trains to Stuttgart, Berlin and Köln stop on track 4. Track 5 is the starting point for Nordbahn services to Heide. In addition to these tracks, there are sidings for freight trains.

Due to the electrification, most intercity trains coming from the south from Itzehoe are electrically-hauled. At the station, the electric locomotive is swapped for a diesel locomotive for the remaining leg to Westerland. In the opposite direction, the procedure is reversed.

The Itzehoe-Wrist railway operated until 27 September 1975.
