= Westerland (Sylt) station =

Railway station in Sylt, Germany

Westerland (Sylt) Weesterlön (Söl)
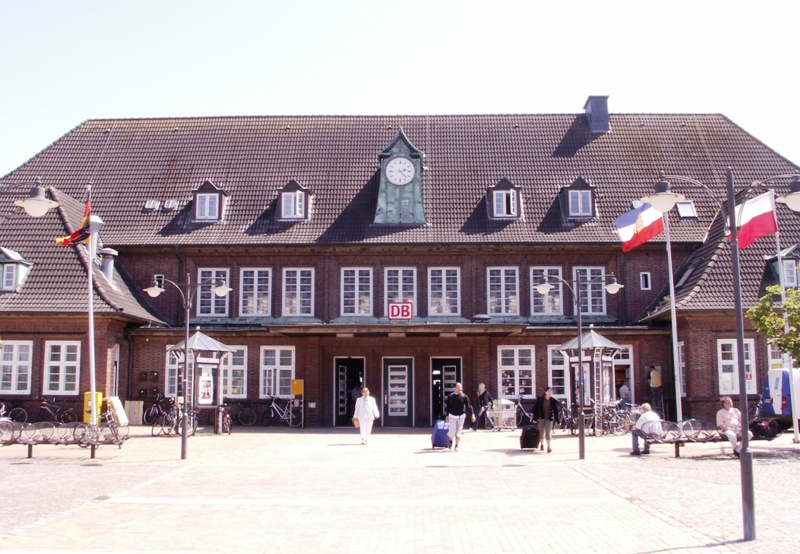

General information
- Location: Kirchenweg 1; 25980 Westerland; Germany
- Coordinates: 54°54′24″N 8°18′42″E
- Owner: Deutsche Bahn
- Operator: DB Station&Service
- Line: Marsh Railway (Westerland - Elmshorn)
- Platforms: 2 island platforms and 1 car shuttle terminus
- Tracks: 6
- Connections: Bus, Taxi

Construction
- Parking: Park and ride
- Accessible: Yes

Other information
- Station code: 6714
- DS100 code: AWLA
- IBNR: 8006369
- Category: 3
- Fare zone: NAH.SH: 1050
- Website: www.bahnhof.de

History
- Opened: 1 June 1927

Services
Preceding station	DB Fernverkehr	Following station
Terminus	ICE 18	Niebüll towards Berlin Südkreuz
Terminus	ICE 24	Niebüll towards Frankfurt (Main) Hbf
Terminus	ICE 33	Niebüll towards Köln Hbf
Preceding station	DB Regio Nord	Following station
Terminus	RE 6	Keitum towards Hamburg-Altona
Terminus	RE 60	Keitum towards Hamburg-Altona
Location

Westerland (Sylt) station (German: Bahnhof Westerland (Sylt)) is a terminus railway station in the town of Westerland, Schleswig-Holstein, Germany. The station lies on the Marsh Railway and the train services are operated by Deutsche Bahn and Nord-Ostsee-Bahn.

== Station layout ==
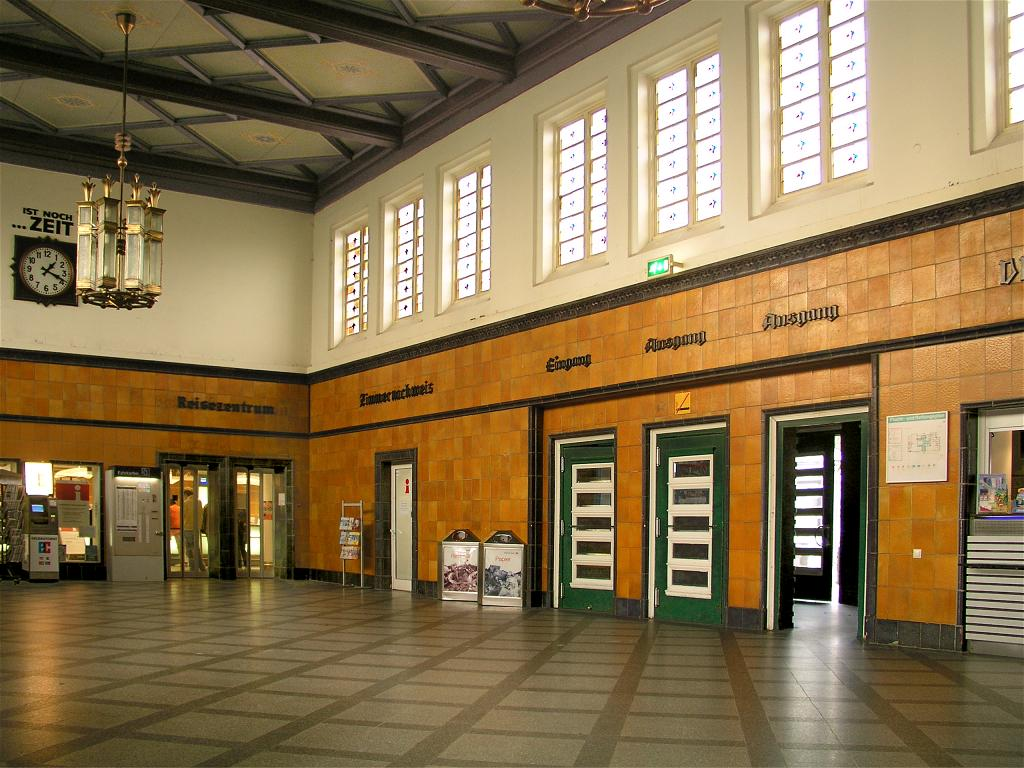
The 1927-built station hall

The station is located on a small square in the town's center. The station building's entrance is located on the side facing the square, the two island platforms are located on the building's backside.

To the left of the passenger platforms is a freight station; to the right is the car shuttle (Autozug Sylt) terminus.

== Rail services ==
In the 2026 timetable, the following services stop at the station:

Line	Route	Frequency	Operator
ICE 18	Westerland (Sylt) – Niebüll – Hamburg – Berlin – Berlin Südkreuz	One train pair	DB Fernverkehr
ICE 24	Westerland (Sylt) – Niebüll – Hamburg – Hanover – Kassel-Wilhelmshöhe – Frankfurt	One train pair	DB Fernverkehr
ICE 33	Westerland (Sylt) – Niebüll – Hamburg – Bremen – Essen – Cologne	One or two train pairs	DB Fernverkehr
RE 6 / RE 60	Westerland (Sylt) – Niebüll – Husum – Heide (Holst) – Itzehoe – Elmshorn – Hamburg-Altona	Hourly, half hourly in the peak	DB Regio Nord

== See also ==
- List of railway stations in Schleswig-Holstein
- Rail transport in Germany
