= Jübek =

Jübek Jydbæk
- Municipality
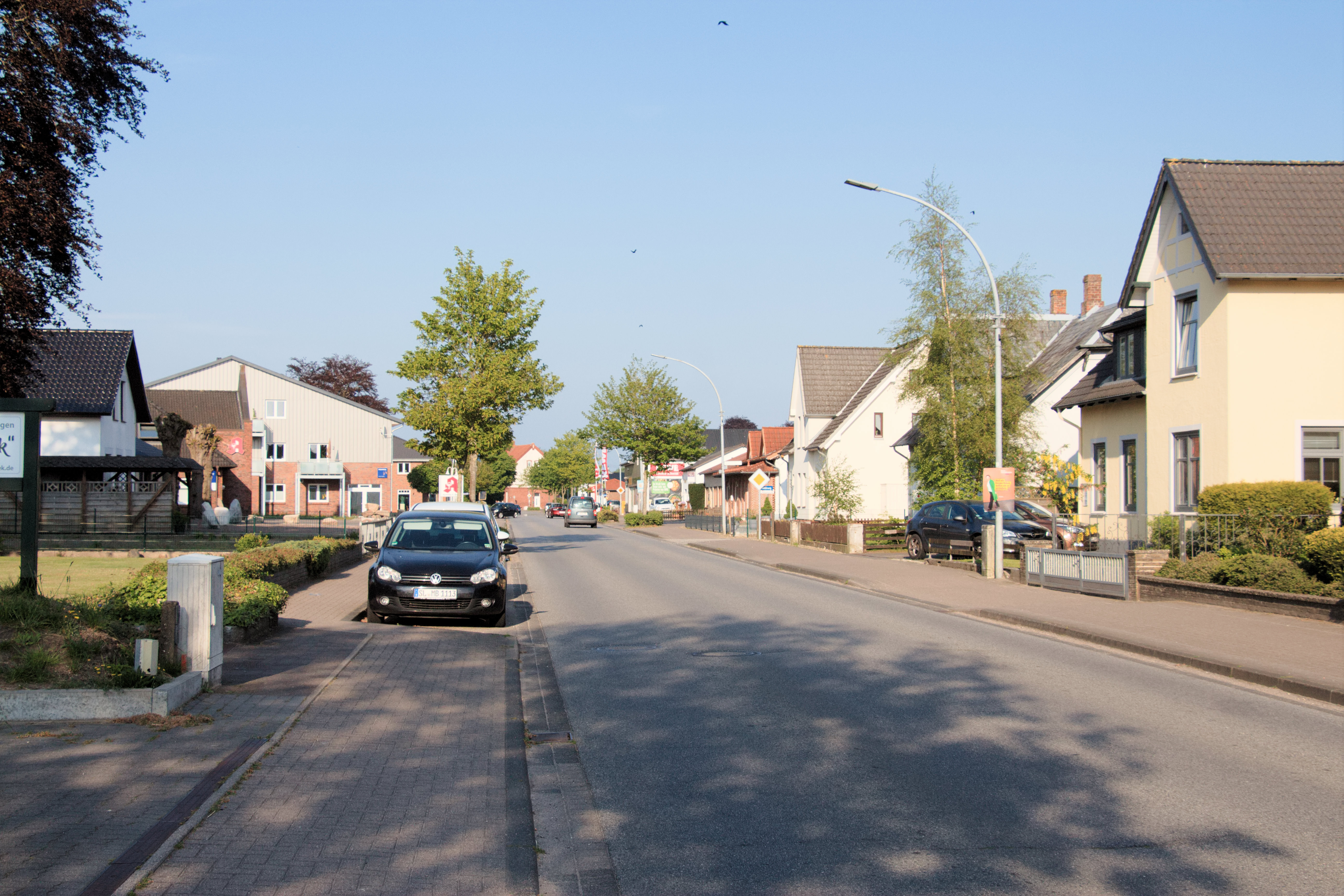

- Coat of arms

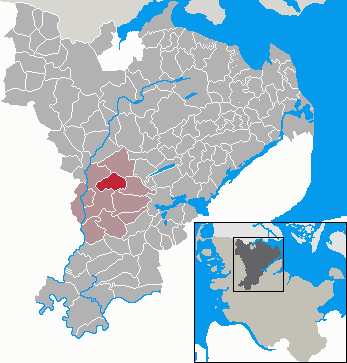
- Location of Jübek; Jydbæk within Schleswig-Flensburg district
- Interactive map of Jübek; Jydbæk
- Location within Germany Location within Schleswig-Holstein
- Coordinates: 54°32′N 9°24′E
- Country: Germany
- State: Schleswig-Holstein
- District: Schleswig-Flensburg
- Municipal assoc.: Arensharde

Government
  - Mayor: Herbert Will

Area
  - Total: 15.58 km^{2} (6.02 sq mi)
- Elevation: 13 m (43 ft)

Population (2025-12-31)
  - Total: 2,766
  - Density: 177.5/km^{2} (459.8/sq mi)
- Time zone: UTC+01:00 (CET)
  - Summer (DST): UTC+02:00 (CEST)
- Postal codes: 24855
- Dialling codes: 04625
- Vehicle registration: SL
- Website: www.amt- silberstedt.de

Jübek (Danish: Jydbæk) is a municipality in the district of Schleswig-Flensburg, in Schleswig-Holstein, Germany.
