= Haffkrug station =

Railway station in Scharbeutz, Germany

Haffkrug
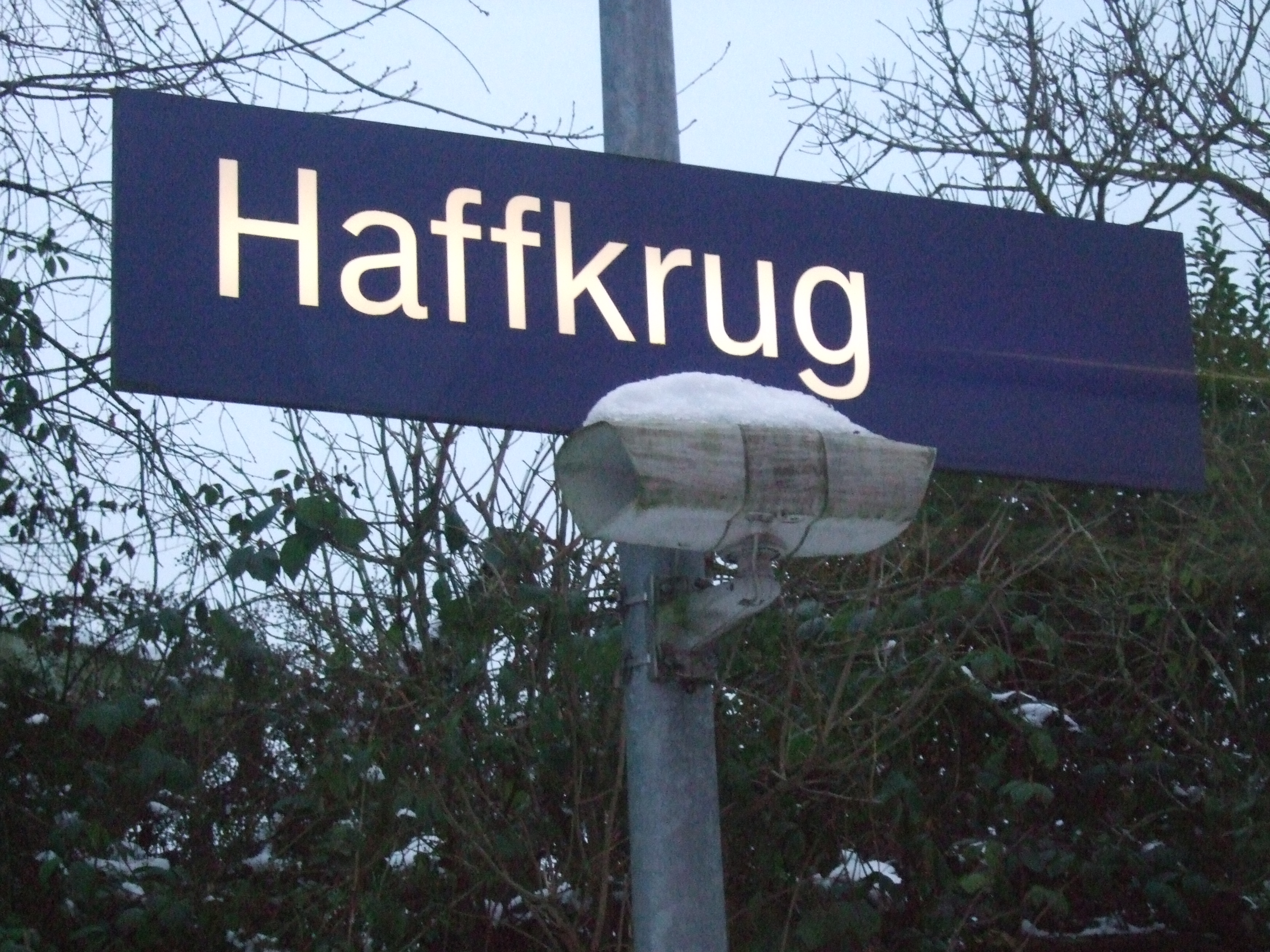
- 2009

General information
- Location: Bahnhofstraße 48; 23683 Haffkrug; Schleswig-Holstein; Germany
- Coordinates: 54.0541°N 10.7427°E
- Owner: Deutsche Bahn
- Operator: DB Station&Service
- Lines: Lübeck–Puttgarden railway (KBS 140)
- Platforms: 2 side platforms
- Tracks: 2
- Train operators: DB Regio Nord
- Connections: RB 85

Construction
- Parking: yes
- Cycle facilities: yes
- Accessible: yes

Other information
- Station code: 2453
- DS100 code: AHAF
- IBNR: 8002504
- Category: 6
- Fare zone: NAH.SH
- Website: www.bahnhof.de

Services
Preceding station	DB Regio Nord	Following station
Scharbeutz towards Lübeck Hbf	RB 85	Sierksdorf towards Neustadt (Holst)
Location
- Location within Schleswig-Holstein Location within Germany Location within Europe

Haffkrug station (German: Bahnhof Haffkrug) is a railway station in the municipality of Haffkrug, located in the Ostholstein district in Schleswig-Holstein, Germany.

The construction of the Fehmarn Belt fixed link and the land connection of the new tunnel the station will be reorganised in two separate stations. In the future there will be the station Haffkrug (west) as part of the land connection for the traffic from and to Scandinavia and the station Haffkrug (east) as part of the so called Bäderbahn between Lübeck and Neustadt in Holstein (Lübeck–Puttgarden railway).
