= Lübeck-Travemünde Hafen station =

Railway station in Lübeck, Germany

Lübeck Travemünde Hafen
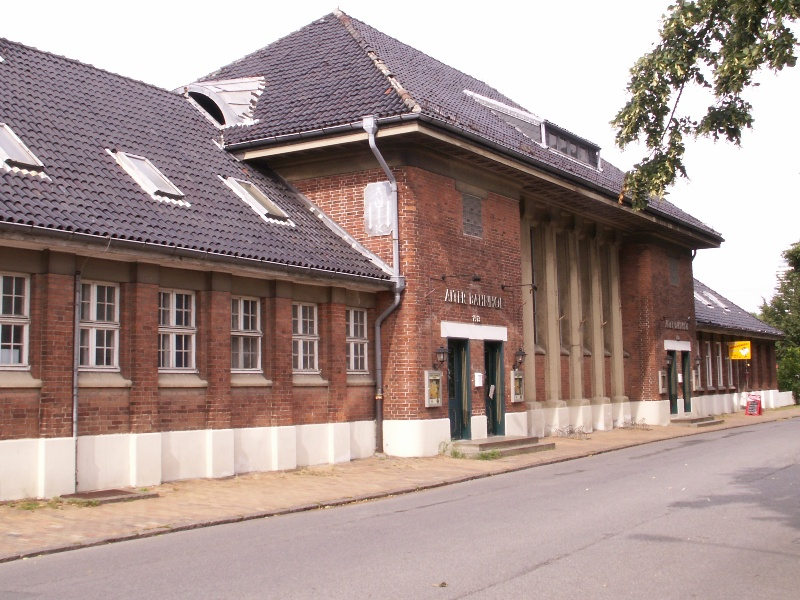

General information
- Location: Vogteistr. 13, Travemünde; Schleswig-Holstein, Germany
- Coordinates: 53°57′32″N 10°51′59″E
- Line: Lübeck–Travemünde Strand (19.6 km)
- Platforms: 1

Construction
- Accessible: Yes
- Architect: Fritz Klingholz
- Architectural style: Art Nouveau

Other information
- Station code: 3812
- DS100 code: ALTH
- IBNR: 8003777
- Category: 6
- Website: www.bahnhof.de

History
- Opened: 1 August 1882; 144 years ago
- Electrified: 14 December 2008; 17 years ago

Services
Preceding station	DB Regio Nord	Following station
Lübeck-Travemünde Skandinavienkai towards Hamburg Hbf	RE 8	Lübeck-Travemünde Strand Terminus
Lübeck-Travemünde Skandinavienkai towards Lübeck Hbf	RB 86	Lübeck-Travemünde Strand Terminus
Location

Lübeck-Travemünde Hafen station (also known as the Lübeck Hafenbahnhof in German) in Lübeck district of Travemünde in the German state of Schleswig-Holstein. It is one of three railway stations in Travemünde along with Lübeck-Travemünde Strand station.

== History ==
The station was built by the Lübeck-Büchen Railway Company (Lübeck-Büchener Eisenbahn, LBE), which opened the railway from Lübeck to Travemünde in 1882. It originally ended at Travemünde Hafen station, but the line was extended to Travemünde Strand station in 1898. A three km-long branch line from Travemünde Hafen station to Niendorf on the Baltic Sea was opened in 1913 to improve access to this tourist spot. As part of this work a new station building was built to a design by Fritz Klingholz, who had also designed the new Travemünde Strand station a little earlier. The branch line to Niendorf, however, was closed in 1974. The station building was sold in 1996 and was used as a restaurant until 2014. The station, which has been heritage-listed since 1992, was modernised in 2004 and a new outdoor platform was built on the former track 1 next to the former station building. The island platform on tracks 2 and 3 was abandoned. The freight tracks with a free loading track and loading ramp west of the entrance building (tracks 12 and 13) and the tracks north of the platforms (track 4–8) were abandoned and are no longer connected and have been partly dismantled. The station and the track have been electrified since 2008.

== Rail services ==
The following service stops at the station:

Train class	Route	Timetable route
RE 8 RB 86	(Hamburg Hauptbahnhof on summer weekends) – Lübeck Hauptbahnhof – Lübeck-Dänischburg/IKEA – Lübeck-Kücknitz – Lübeck-Travemünde Skandinavienkai – Lübeck-Travemünde Hafen – Lübeck-Travemünde Strand	KBS 104
