= Pöppendorf camp =

Postwar refugee and displaced persons camp in Lübeck, Germany

- Refugee transit and displaced persons camp
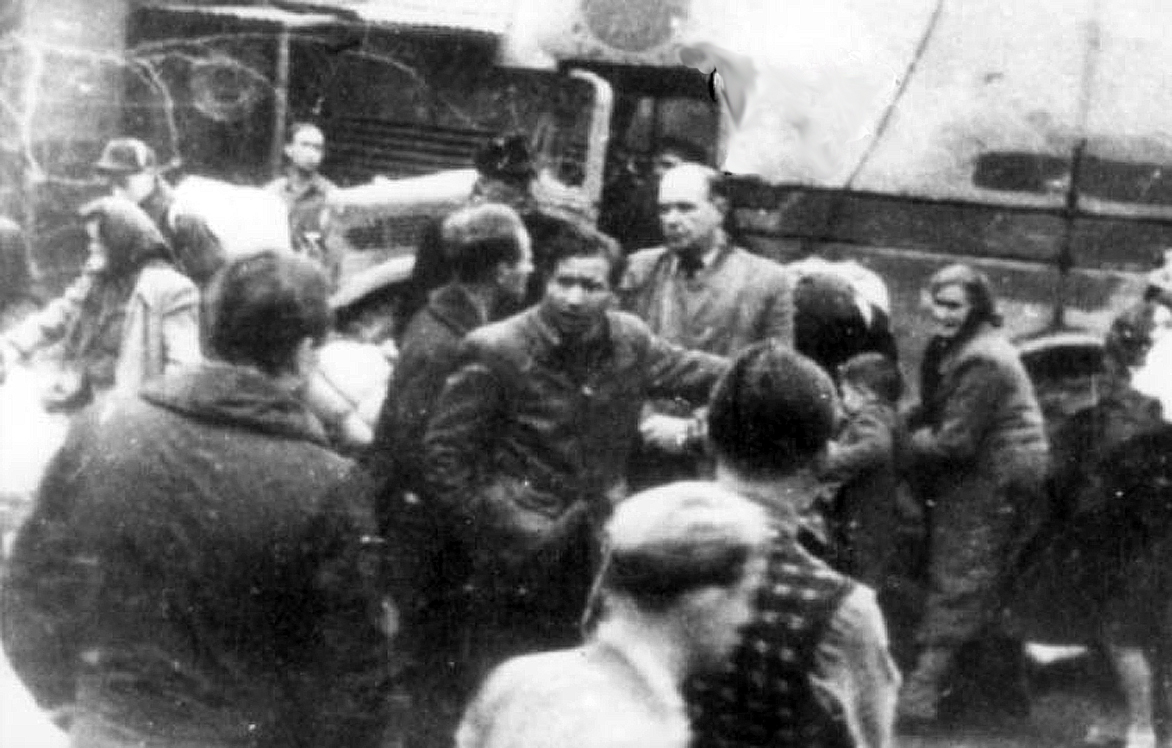
- Mordechai Rosmann at Pöppendorf, 15 September 1947
- Interactive map of Pöppendorf camp
- Coordinates: 53.922°N 10.793°E
- Location: Waldhusener Forst, Kücknitz, Lübeck, Schleswig-Holstein, Germany
- Occupation zone: British occupation zone
- Previous use: Military discharge camp
- Established by: British military government
- Opened: July 1945
- DP operation: September–November 1947 (Exodus 1947 phase)
- Closed: Spring 1951
- Resident leadership: Mordechai Rosmann, chairman of the Jewish camp committee (Exodus phase)
- Supporting organizations: American Jewish Joint Distribution Committee (Exodus phase); Jewish Relief Unit (Exodus phase); ORT (Exodus phase)
- Resident groups: German refugees and expellees; Jewish passengers of the Exodus 1947
- Population: 2,717 (Exodus residents); September 1947
- Functions: Refugee reception and transit; Interzonal transfer coordination; Temporary residential accommodation; Exodus internment and screening (1947)
- Successor camps: Emden (Exodus residents)

Pöppendorf camp was a postwar refugee transit and residential camp in the Waldhusener Forst near Lübeck, Schleswig-Holstein. Established by the British military government in July 1945, it was initially used as a discharge camp for almost 80,000 members of the Wehrmacht returning from the German occupation of Norway. From November 1945 it became a major transit camp for German refugees and expellees; more than half a million people passed through the camp before it was dissolved and demolished in spring 1951.

Pöppendorf is also associated with the Exodus 1947. In September 1947 it and the nearby Am Stau camp were prepared to receive the Jewish passengers whom the British had returned to Germany after preventing their entry into Mandatory Palestine. At Pöppendorf the passengers resisted British screening and proposals that would disperse them, elected a Jewish camp committee, and developed educational, religious and medical services with assistance from Jewish relief organizations. Between 2 and 5 November 1947, 2,342 Pöppendorf residents were transferred to former barracks in Emden.

== Location and establishment ==
The camp was located in the Waldhusener Forst, between the former Kücknitz railway station and Pöppendorf in the Waldhusen-Pöppendorf area of Lübeck. It lay near the Lübeck–Lübeck-Travemünde Strand railway, which provided the principal rail connection used during the Exodus episode.

The British military government established the installation in July 1945 as a discharge camp for almost 80,000 Wehrmacht personnel returning from Norway. The first German refugees and expellees arrived in November 1945. During 1946 as many as 3,000 people per day passed through Pöppendorf, and the camp also organized the movement of tens of thousands of people between the occupation zones of Allied-occupied Germany.

By spring 1947, reception capacity in the cities and districts of Schleswig-Holstein had been exhausted, and some new arrivals remained at Pöppendorf for weeks or months rather than passing through immediately. The camp subsequently served both transit and residential functions until the summer of 1950.

== Exodus 1947 internment ==
=== Arrival and confinement ===
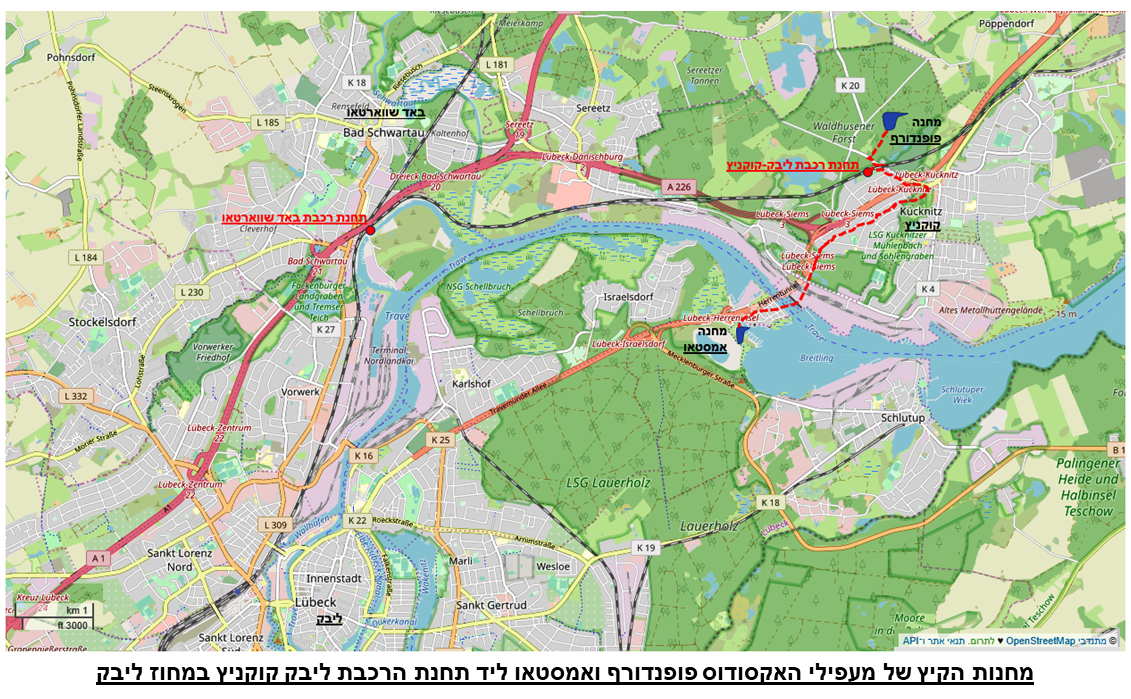
Location of Pöppendorf and Am Stau in the Lübeck area

The Exodus 1947 was part of Aliyah Bet, the organized movement of Jewish immigration to Mandatory Palestine outside British immigration restrictions. It sailed from Sète, France, on 11 July 1947 with more than 4,500 passengers and was intercepted by British forces before reaching Haifa on 18 July. The passengers were transferred to the ships Ocean Vigour, Empire Rival and Runnymede Park. After most refused to disembark at Port-de-Bouc, the British sent the three ships to Germany.

The first passengers reached Lübeck-Kücknitz in closed railway carriages around midday on 8 September 1947. British soldiers and German police guarded the station, and British trucks carried the arrivals to Pöppendorf and Am Stau. Passengers from the remaining transports arrived the following day; by the evening of 9 September, 4,319 Exodus passengers were in the two camps combined.

Preparations had begun in August. British engineers, assisted by Yugoslav displaced persons, erected a barbed-wire perimeter around both camps, and watchtowers with floodlights were installed. At Pöppendorf and Am Stau more than 125 tents supplemented the existing barracks and Nissen huts, while the camps' previous residents were moved to other accommodation. The JDC Archives describes conditions at Pöppendorf as overcrowded, with residents housed in Nissen huts and tents and with inadequate sanitary facilities and no central heating.

=== Population and screening ===
Sources give different figures for the number of Exodus passengers housed specifically at Pöppendorf. The reference project Jüdische DP Lager und Gemeinden in Westdeutschland gives a population of 2,717 in September 1947. A contemporary Jewish Telegraphic Agency report estimated about 3,000 at Pöppendorf on 11 September. The reported figure of 4,319 on 9 September referred to Pöppendorf and Am Stau together.

British authorities repeatedly attempted to register and screen the passengers. Residents resisted efforts to establish their nationalities and previous places of residence, fearing that registration could facilitate their return to countries they had left. The JTA likewise reported resistance to screening and that many residents described themselves as coming from Palestine rather than supplying the information requested.

Benjamin Gruszka, known as Bolek, was a Bricha contact in Lübeck who was employed as an interpreter at the camps. During registration he encouraged the passengers, in Yiddish, to give false personal information, while translating British instructions for the camp authorities.

=== Resident organization ===
On 15 September 1947 the residents elected a Jewish camp committee. Mordechai Rosmann served as its chairman, and the committee represented residents in dealings with the British camp administration and German camp personnel while organizing protests against British policy.

At the beginning of October British soldiers began dismantling the watchtowers. On 6 October the British guards left Pöppendorf, although a British military-government command staff remained. Camp leadership was transferred to the Jewish committee, which worked with the German camp administration, while a Jewish camp police force assumed responsibility for internal order and guarding the camp. Residents could thereafter leave the camp using newly issued papers.

The committee maintained the passengers' collective opposition to proposals that would disperse them among other destinations and continued to press for their movement to Palestine.

=== Relief, education and religious life ===
Five days after the passengers arrived, Jewish relief organizations were permitted to enter the camps. The American Jewish Joint Distribution Committee delivered food, clothing and other supplies; the Jewish community of Lübeck supplied fruit and vegetables, and other organizations and communities also sent aid. The JDC later worked with the Jewish Agency for Palestine and the Jewish Relief Unit in providing medical assistance.

Jewish Relief Unit personnel addressed health and sanitation problems. On 22 September Jewish physicians, nurses and a pharmacist took over medical care; residents requiring treatment beyond the camp hospital were transferred to hospitals in Lübeck.

Children of school age were taught by Jewish teachers, a kindergarten served younger children, and adults received English instruction. ORT established a school at Pöppendorf, and improvised synagogues served the religious life of the camps. The compiled Pöppendorf camp profile records a kindergarten, elementary school, prayer room and infirmary. The JDC supplied religious material and food for Rosh Hashanah and records that schools included early-childhood instruction and Talmud Torah classes.

=== Transfer to Emden ===
The Nissen huts and remaining tents were unsuitable for winter accommodation, and British authorities decided to move the Exodus residents to barracks in Emden and Sengwarden, near Wilhelmshaven. A Jewish advance group inspected the new quarters before the transfer.

The Jewish camp leadership coordinated the move from Pöppendorf. Between 2 and 5 November 1947 residents were taken by truck to Bad Schwartau railway station, from where 2,342 people were transported by train to former barracks in Emden. Residents of Am Stau were transferred separately to former naval barracks at Sengwarden. The compiled Pöppendorf profile likewise records that all of the camp's Jewish residents were transferred to Emden in November.

== Later use and dismantling ==
After the Exodus residents departed, Pöppendorf resumed its refugee transit function. The camp continued to be used as a residential and transit camp until the summer of 1950. It was dissolved and demolished in spring 1951.

== Commemoration and research ==
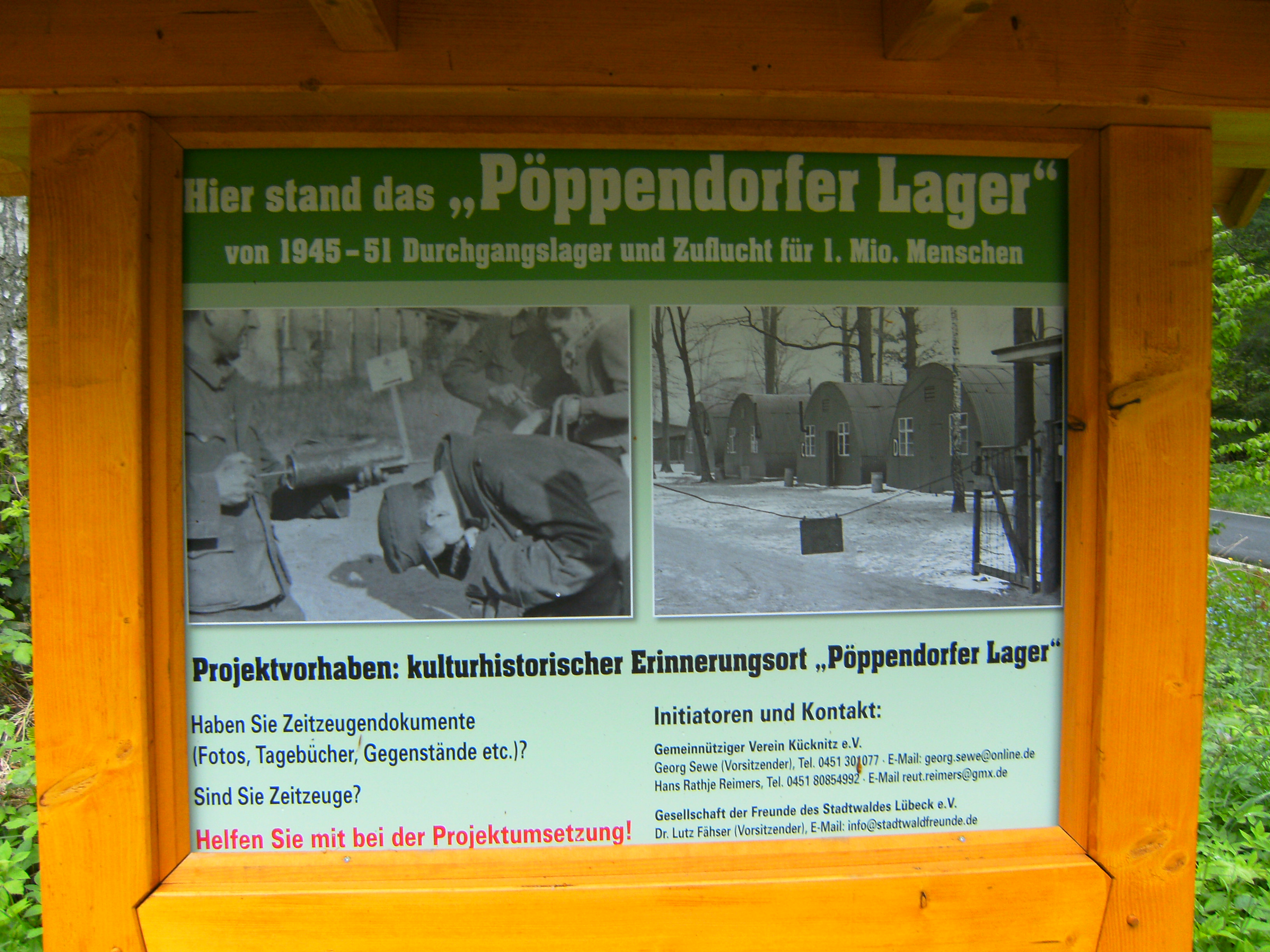
Memorial board at the former camp site

In the late 1990s, five students at Lübeck's Geschwister-Prenski school researched the history of the Exodus passengers at Pöppendorf and presented their work in an exhibition that was subsequently shown in cities across Germany. Their research was published in 1999 as Pöppendorf statt Palästina. In 2018 the Industriemuseum Herrenwyk opened the exhibition Vertrieben – Verloren – Verteilt: Drehscheibe Pöppendorf 1945–1951, devoted to the camp's wider postwar history; it ran through April 2019, and a text-and-image version was subsequently shown at the Hanse-Schule in Lübeck.

== See also ==
- Bergen-Belsen displaced persons camp
- Displaced persons camps in post–World War II Europe
- Sh'erit ha-Pletah
