= Sierksdorf station =

Railway station in Sierksdorf, Germany

Sierksdorf
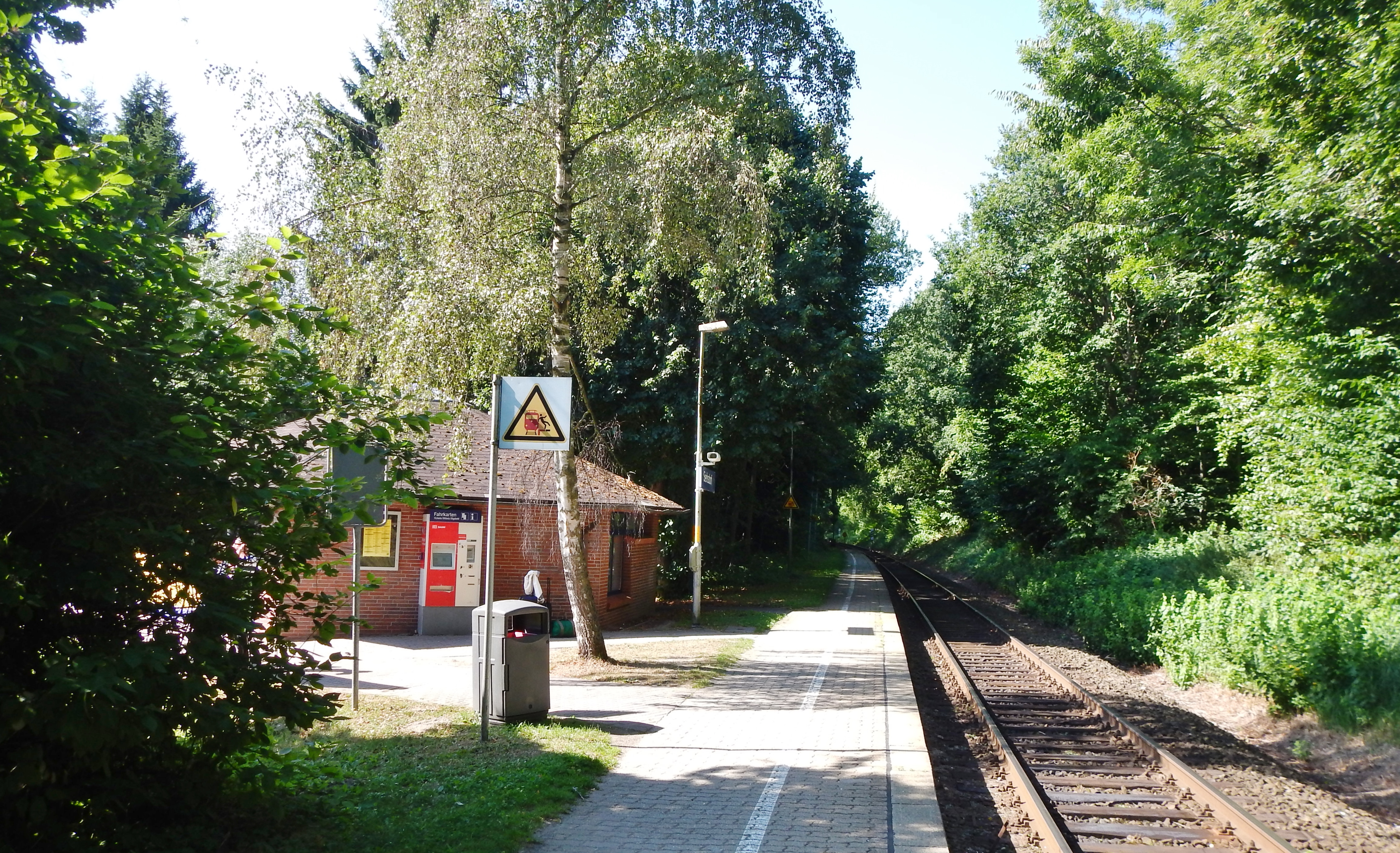
- 2013

General information
- Location: Bahnhofstraße; 23730 Sierksdorf; Schleswig-Holstein; Germany
- Coordinates: 54.0681°N 10.7680°E
- Owner: Deutsche Bahn
- Operator: DB Station&Service
- Lines: Lübeck–Puttgarden railway (KBS 140)
- Platforms: 1 side platform
- Tracks: 1
- Train operators: DB Regio Nord
- Connections: RB 85

Construction
- Parking: yes
- Cycle facilities: yes
- Accessible: yes

Other information
- Station code: 5846
- DS100 code: ASID
- IBNR: 8005561
- Category: 6
- Fare zone: NAH.SH
- Website: www.bahnhof.de

Services
Preceding station	DB Regio Nord	Following station
Haffkrug towards Lübeck Hbf	RB 85	Neustadt (Holst) Terminus
Location
- Location within Schleswig-Holstein Location within Germany Location within Europe

Sierksdorf station (German: Bahnhof Sierksdorf) is a railway station in the municipality of Sierksdorf, located in the Ostholstein district in Schleswig-Holstein, Germany.
