= Lübeck-Travemünde Strand station =

Railway station in Travemünde, Germany

Lübeck Travemünde Strand
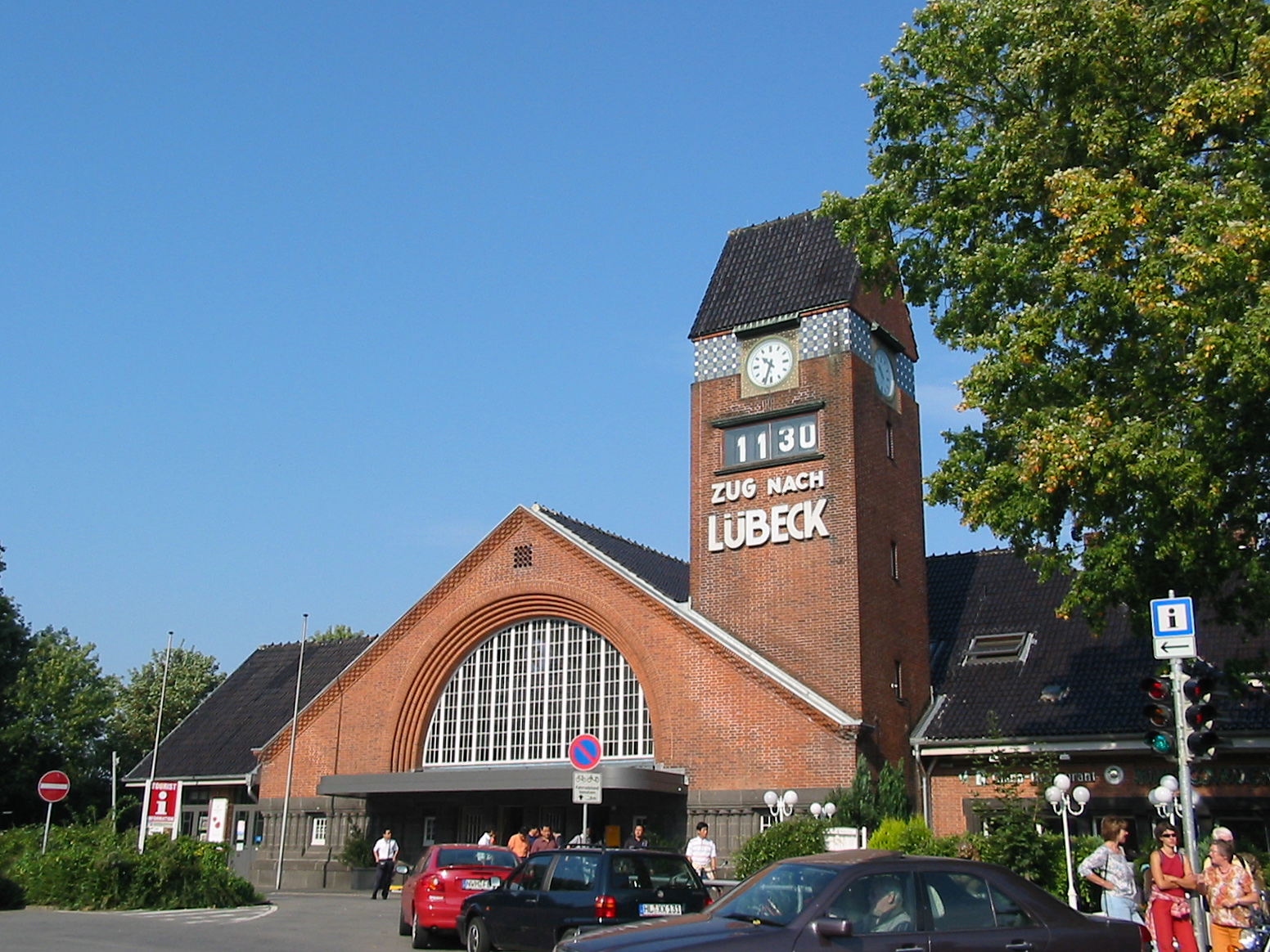

General information
- Location: Bertlingstr. 21, Travemünde; Schleswig-Holstein, Germany
- Coordinates: 53°57′54″N 10°52′34″E
- Line: Lübeck–Travemünde Strand (20.6 km)
- Platforms: 1

Construction
- Accessible: Yes
- Architect: Fritz Klingholz
- Architectural style: Art Nouveau

Other information
- Station code: 3814
- DS100 code: ALTS
- IBNR: 8003778
- Category: 6
- Website: www.bahnhof.de

History
- Opened: 1 July 1898; 128 years ago
- Electrified: 14 December 2008; 17 years ago

Key dates
- 1912: current building erected

Services
Preceding station	DB Regio Nord	Following station
Lübeck-Travemünde Hafen towards Hamburg Hbf	RE 8	Terminus
Lübeck-Travemünde Hafen towards Lübeck Hbf	RB 86	Terminus
Location

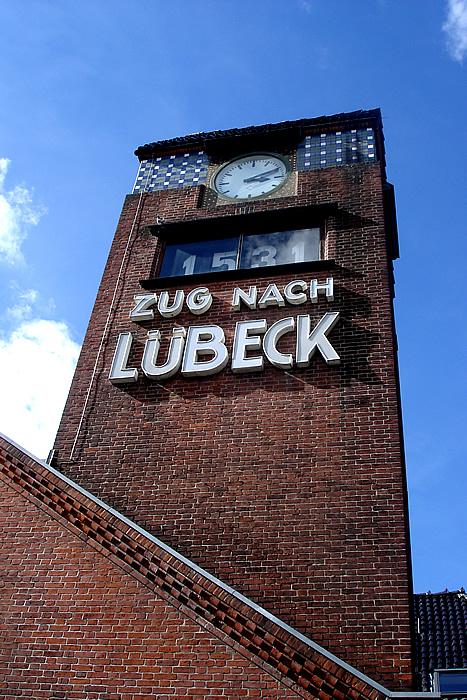
Clock tower with departures board

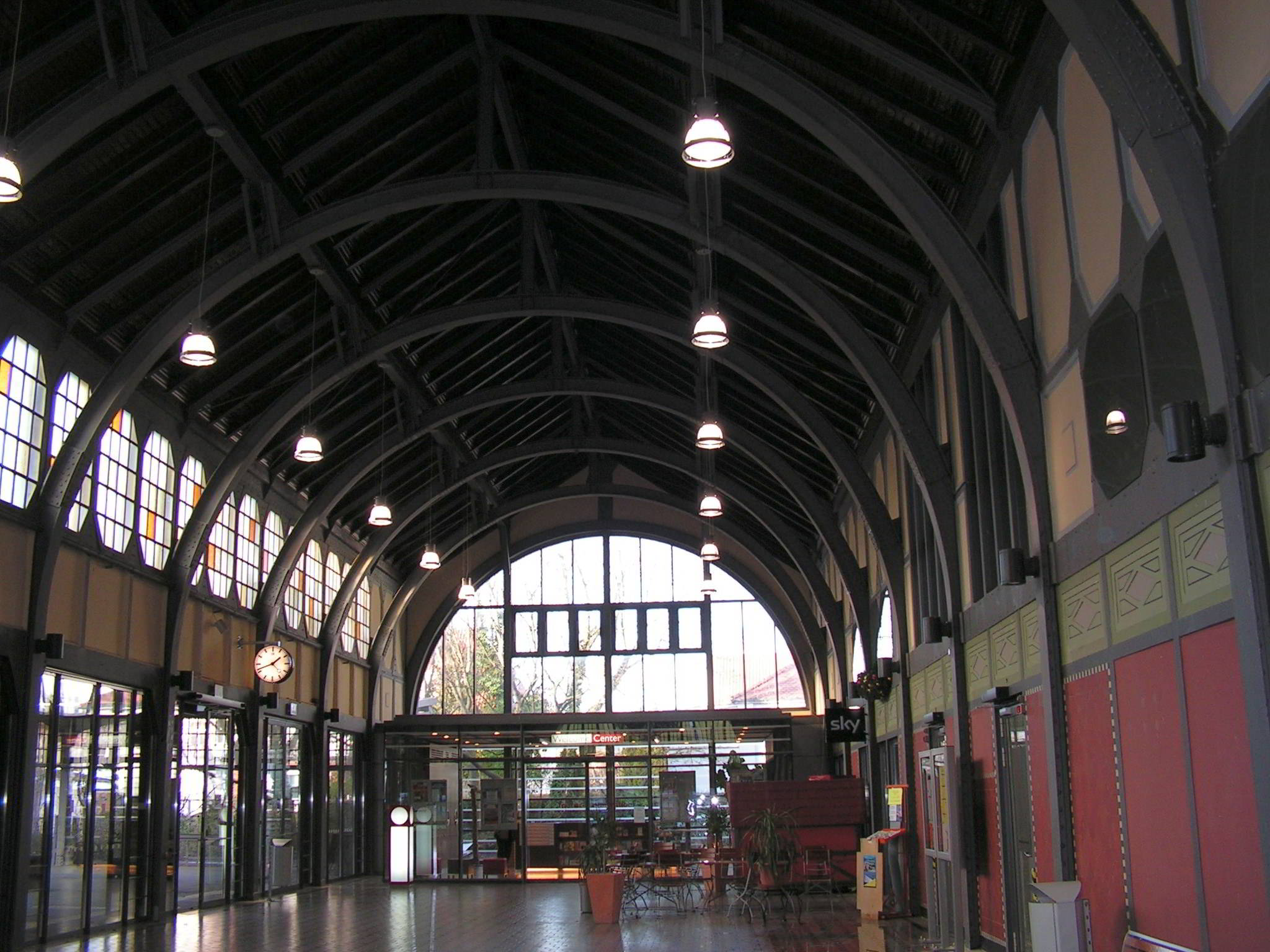
Interior of the station

Lübeck-Travemünde Strand (beach) station (also known as Travemünde Strandbahnhof in German) is a station in Lübeck district of Travemünde in the German state of Schleswig-Holstein. It has heritage protection and is one of three railway stations in Travemünde along with Lübeck-Travemünde Hafen station at the former ferry terminal and Skandinavienkai (Scandinavia Quay) station. The terminus is at the end of the predominantly single-track Lübeck–Lübeck-Travemünde Strand railway between Lübeck Hauptbahnhof and Travemünde.

== History ==
The station was built by the Lübeck-Büchen Railway Company (Lübeck-Büchener Eisenbahn, LBE), which opened the railway from Lübeck to Travemünde in 1882. It originally ended at the port and the Strand station was built when the line was extended to the beach in 1898. The original station building was made of wood and it was replaced in 1911/1912 with the current building built with elements of Art Nouveau to a design by Fritz Klingholz. The entrance building is supported by steel trusses and has a triangular gable and lunette. A special feature is the clock tower, which includes a departures board that is visible from the beach and shows the time of the next service to Lübeck Hauptbahnhof. It is also under monument protection. In 1991, the station was declared a national monument.

The building was remodelled up to 2006, mainly affecting the interior. The floor was renewed to the original design, masonry and glazing was removed from the steel truss, automatic doors were installed and the toilets were made accessible for wheelchairs. The listed roofs of the train shed and the concourse at the end of the platforms were renovated. The costs amounting to €2.3 million were contributed by Deutsche Bahn, the Federal Government, the city of Lübeck, the state of Schleswig-Holstein, the Possehl Foundation (Possehl-Stiftung) and the Charitable Association (Gemeinnützige Verein) of Travemünde. The station building now contains shops, restaurants and a tourist "Welcome Center".

In 2011, the platform was renewed at a cost of €1.4 million for the disabled in preparation for its use as a combined platform for future interchange with buses.

On 12 March 2015, Deutsche Bahn announced that it would sell of the station building and justified its intention on its current poor condition, which made it difficult to find tenants. The toilets were closed in 2014 and infected with mould. In the outside area, the second platform, which was no longer used, had been completely eroded. In October 2015, a Lübeck-based pilot bought the station building for €760,000. He planned to use the entrance building, among other things, for restaurants and commercial space. He also planned to present the history of the station in one area. At the beginning of 2023, the station was still in the same condition. Lübeck's mayor, Jan Lindenau, stated that the municipality was trying to buy the station from the owner. He claimed that it had been wrong not to have placed a bid at the 2015 auction.

== Rail services ==
The following service stops at the station:

Train class	Route	Timetable route
RE 8 RB 86	(Hamburg Hauptbahnhof on summer weekends –) Lübeck Hauptbahnhof – Lübeck-Dänischburg/IKEA – Lübeck-Kücknitz – Lübeck-Travemünde Skandinavienkai –Lübeck-Travemünde Hafen – Lübeck-Travemünde Strand	KBS 104

== Popular culture ==
The exterior and interior of the station were used as locations in episode 4 of the 1982 miniseries Smiley's People. Alec Guinness is seen parking at the station, buying a ticket, and standing on the platform.
