= Neustadt (Holst) station =

Railway station in Neustadt in Holstein, Germany

Neustadt (Holst)
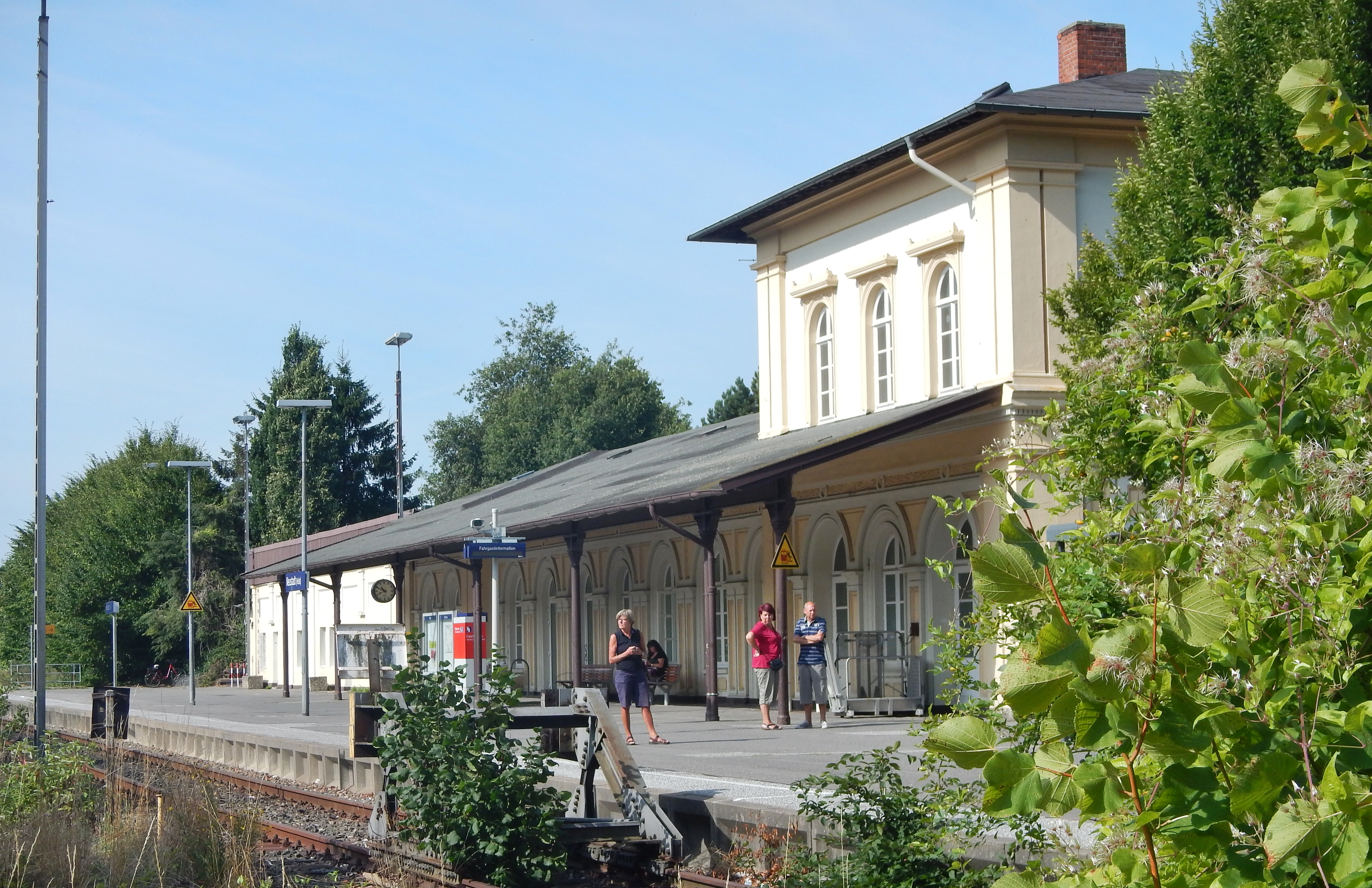
- 2013

General information
- Location: Bahnhofstraße 16; 23730 Neustadt in Holstein; Schleswig-Holstein; Germany
- Coordinates: 54.104°N 10.808°E
- Owner: Deutsche Bahn
- Operator: DB Station&Service
- Lines: Lübeck–Puttgarden railway (KBS 140)
- Platforms: 1 side platform
- Tracks: 1
- Train operators: DB Regio Nord
- Connections: RB 85

Construction
- Parking: yes
- Cycle facilities: yes
- Accessible: yes

Other information
- Station code: 4447
- DS100 code: ANT
- IBNR: 8004327
- Category: 6
- Fare zone: NAH.SH
- Website: www.bahnhof.de

Services
| Preceding station | DB Regio Nord | Following station |
|---|---|---|
| Sierksdorf towards Lübeck Hbf | RB 85 | Terminus |
Location
- Location within Schleswig-Holstein Location within Germany Location within Europe

Neustadt (Holst) station (German: Haltepunkt Neustadt (Holst)) is a railway station in the municipality of Neustadt in Holstein, located in the Ostholstein district in Schleswig-Holstein, Germany.
