= Lübeck–Lübeck-Travemünde Strand railway =

Railway line in Germany

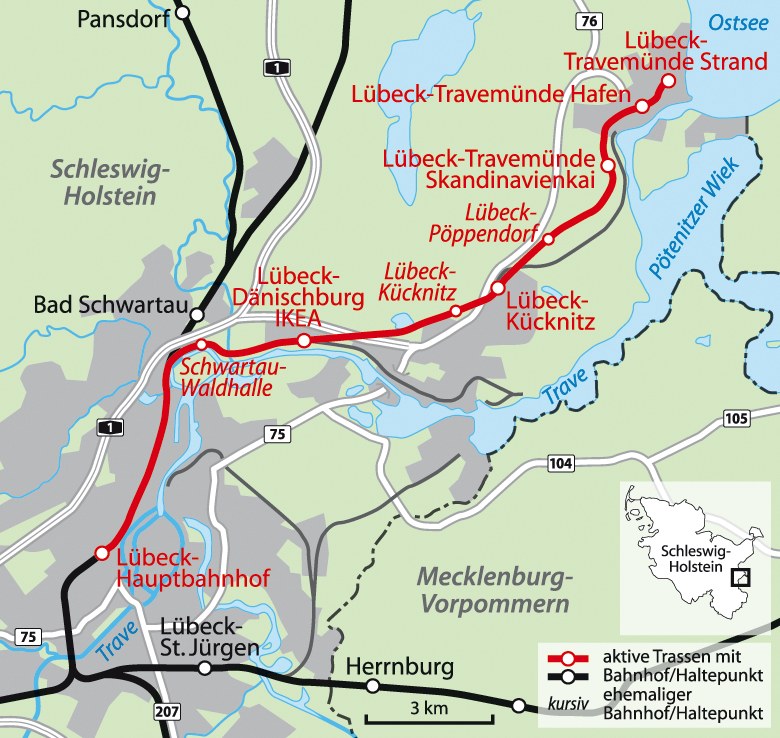

Overview
- Line number: 1100, 1113–1115, 1117
- Locale: Schleswig-Holstein, Germany

Service
- Route number: 104

Technical
- Line length: 20.6 km (12.8 mi)
- Track gauge: 1,435 mm (4 ft 8 1/2 in) standard gauge
- Electrification: 15 kV/16.7 Hz AC catenary
- Operating speed: 120 km/h (75 mph) (maximum)

The Lübeck-Travemünde Strand railway line is a mostly single-track, electrified railway in the German state of Schleswig-Holstein. It mainly serves local services to Travemünde’s Baltic Sea beach, the Baltic Sea ferries and suburbs of Lübeck.

== Route ==
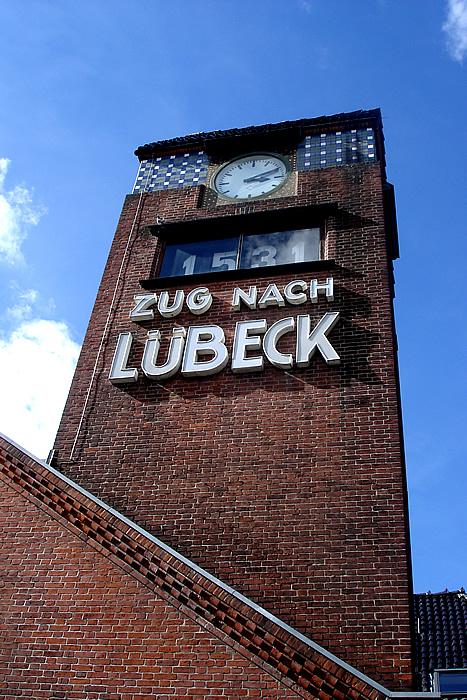
Clock tower at Travemünde Strand station designed by Fritz Klingholz

The railway runs from Lübeck Hauptbahnhof (main station) to the north together with the Lübeck–Puttgarden railway (Vogelfluglinie, "Bird Flight Line") and the Kiel–Lübeck railway. Shortly before reaching Bad Schwartau station the line forks off to the east. A freight line branches off the Travemünde line to Lübeck-Dänischburg. The main line then reaches the newly built Lübeck-Kücknitz station. The line continues along the lower course of the Trave, until it reaches Lübeck-Travemünde Skandinavienkai (Scandinavia Quay) station. This station was built near the quays of the ferries to Sweden and Finland because the older Travemünde Hafen (harbour) station was too far away from the ferries. As part of the reorganisation and expansion of the Scandinavia Quay, the track was moved in 2005 and a new station was built. The line reaches Lübeck-Travemünde Hafen station, which is adjacent to Ostpreußenkai (East Prussia Quay). There was formerly a branch to Brodten via Niendorf, parts of which are now used as a cycle and hiking trail. The end of the line is the terminal station of Lübeck-Travemünde Strand station, which is located in the resort district.

== History ==
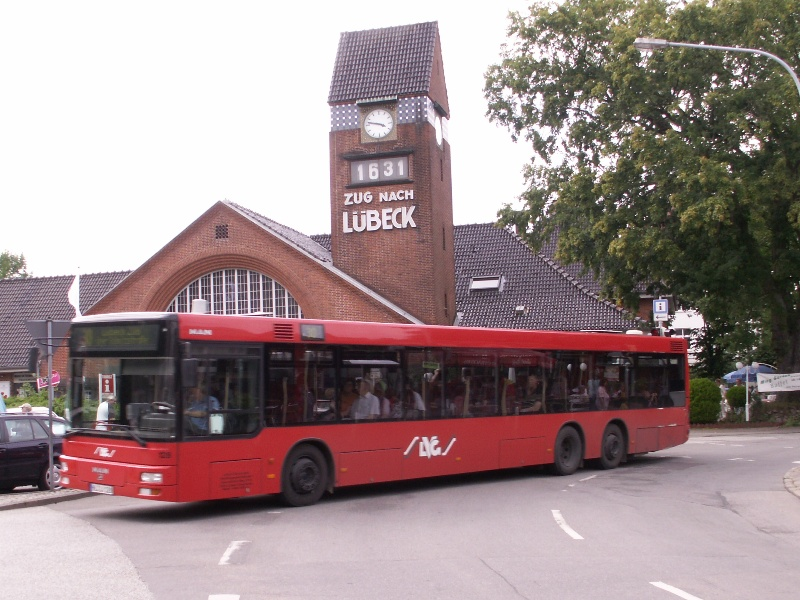
Clock tower of Travemünde Strand station

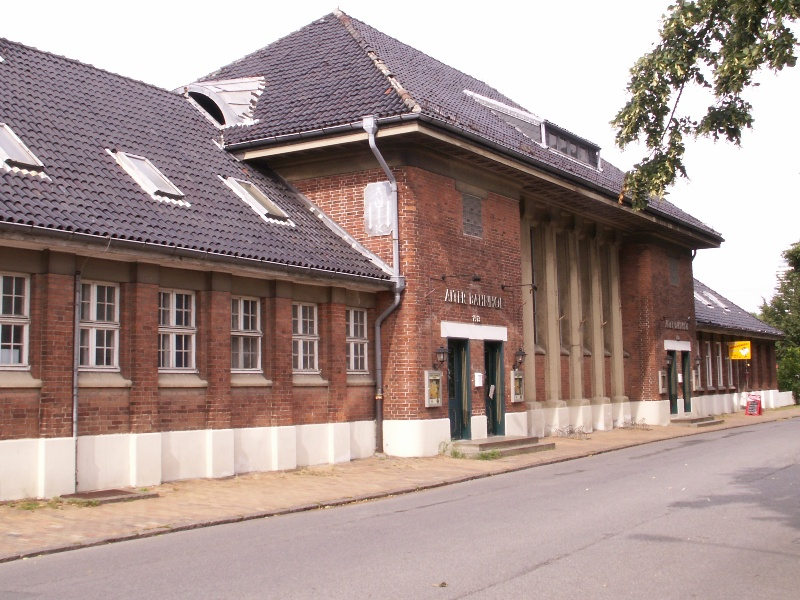
Travemünde Hafen station

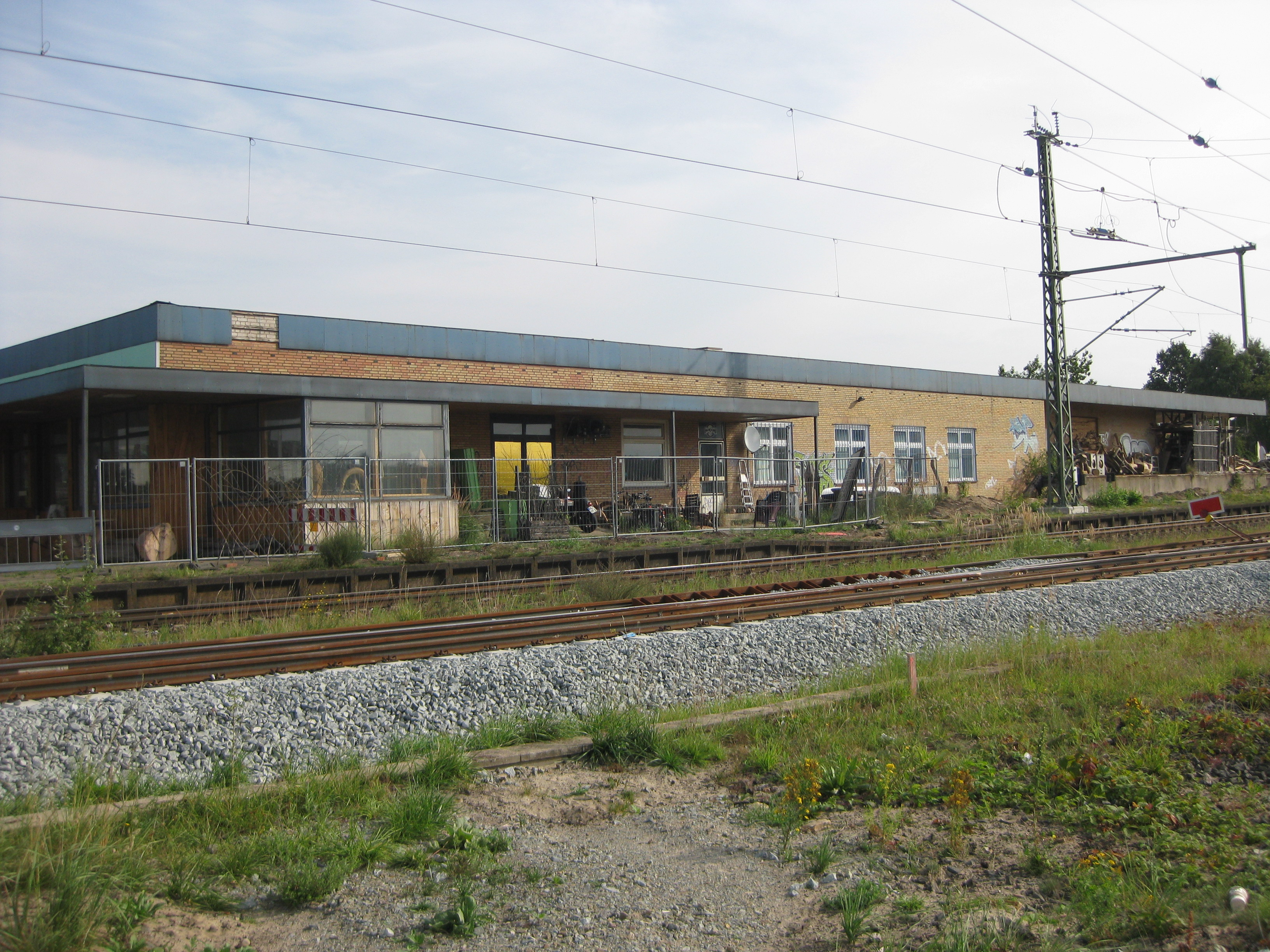
Former Dänischburg station

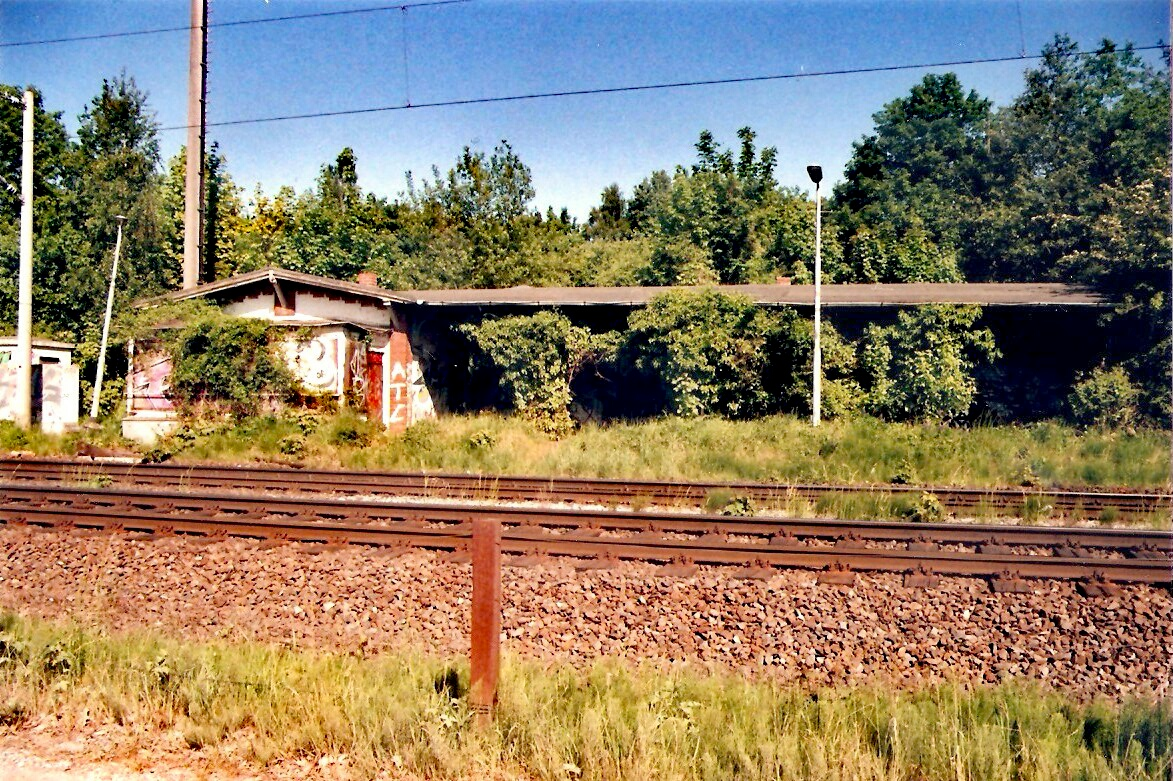
Former Bad Schwartaus Waldhalle station

The line was opened on 1 August 1882 and extended from the present Lübeck-Travemünde Hafen station to Lübeck-Travemünde Strand (beach) station on 1 July 1898. The rapidly growing leisure services at Travemünde required a new Strand station, which was built to the plans of Friedrich Klingholz in the Art Nouveau style and opened in 1911. It has a clock tower that is visible from the beach, which still shows the time of the next service to Lübeck Hauptbahnhof on a large display board.

A three km-long branch line from Lübeck-Travemünde Hafen to Niendorf on the Baltic Sea was opened in 1913 to improve access to this tourist spot.

Until its nationalisation on 1 January 1938, when it became part of the Deutsche Reichsbahn, the line was operated by the Lübeck-Büchen Railway Company (Lübeck-Büchener Eisenbahn, LBE). The LBE, which already operated the line in the 1930s with high quality bi-level cars, also introduced the distinctive slogan "Hamburg, Lübeck, Travemünde–from the sea of houses on the sea" (Aus dem Häusermeer an die See).

Before the Second World War, the line was administered by the Eisenbahndirektion (railway division headquarters) in Schwerin. Later Deutsche Bundesbahn took over operations.

The route between Lübeck-Travemünde Hafen and Niendorf was closed on 29 September 1974. Schwartau-Waldhalle was abandoned in the 1990s.

In 2004, the halt of Lübeck-Travemünde Skandinavienkai was established near the Scandinavia Quay for ferries to Sweden and Finland as the Travemünde Hafen station, which was previously used for the ferry traffic was too far away. In 2006 and 2007, the extensive port facilities and commercial areas at Scandinavia Quay were extended for port-related operations and logistics companies. In this context, the line was moved several hundred metres westward for a length of a kilometre, so that it now runs alongside the Ivendorfer Landstraße (Ivendorf highway). After removing the former hilly landscape, a vast warehouse and industrial area was created between the quay and the new railway line. The new entrance building is located about 1 km south of the now-demolished old building. There is now only a southern access road to the entire port area. Thus, the new halt has no walking access to the Scandinavia Quay more. Passengers arriving by train must change to the bus to reach the ships.

The redesigned historic Strand station reopened after extensive restoration work on 23 May 2006. During this work the formerly broken clock tower clock was also put back into operation.

In 2007, work began on electrifying the line as a continuation of the electrification of the Lübeck–Hamburg railway. The electrification was completed in December 2008. Freight trains since then have been able to operate without having to change locomotives in the Hamburg area.

In July 2010, the double-tracking of the section between Schwartau-Waldhalle and Kücknitz was put into operation requiring the rebuilding of four bridges.

A new halt was opened in Dänischburg with the name of Lübeck-Dänischburg IKEA on 14 December 2014. The 1986 after the closure of the Villeroy & Boch factory, the abandoned halt was reactivated after the LUV-Center shopping centre was built on the former works site with 400.000 m^{2} of retail space. The change of name is due to the fact that the IKEA furniture store in the shopping center had assumed almost the entire cost of the station with an investment of €3 million.

== Rolling stock ==
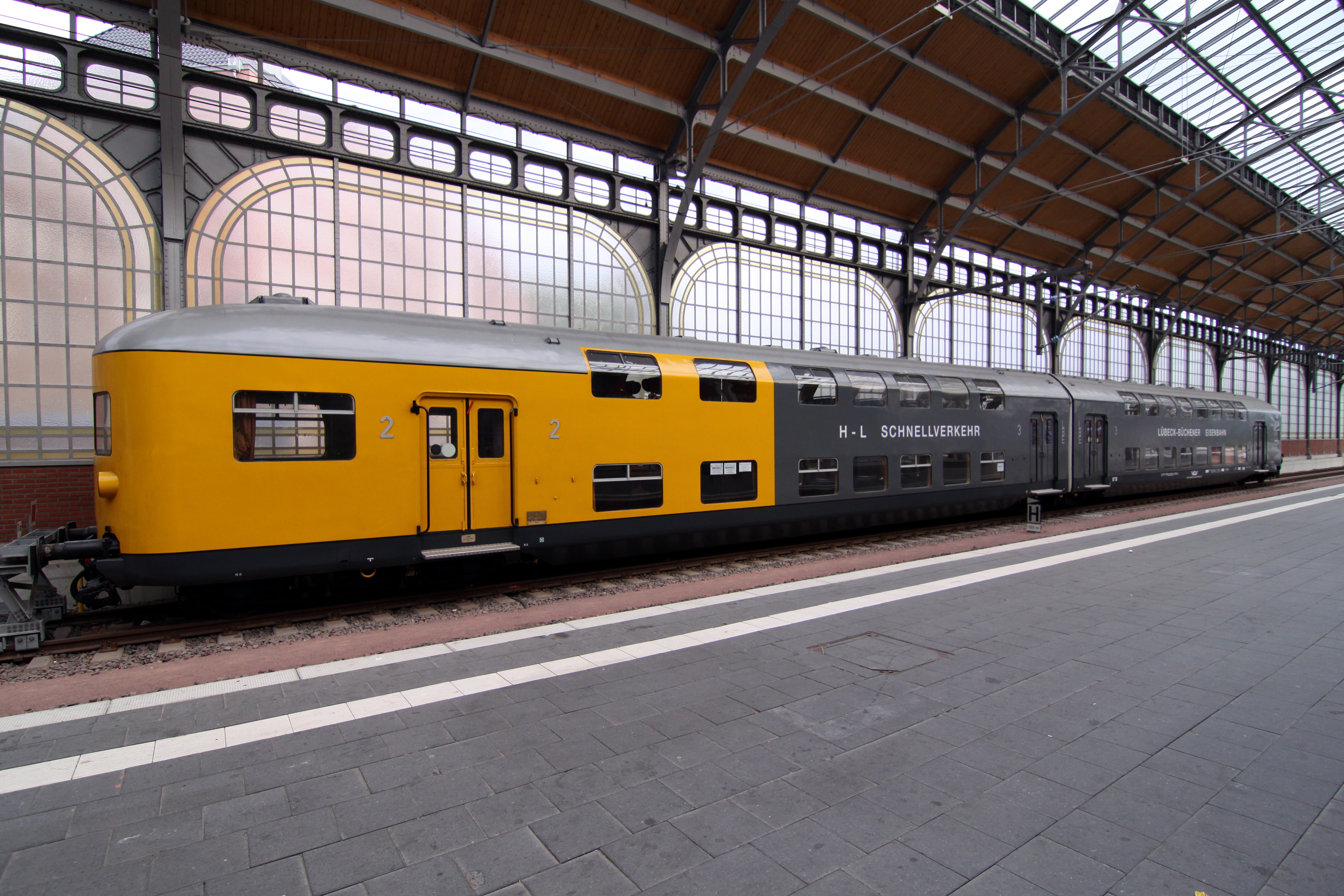
Double-decker streamline push-pull set of the LBE

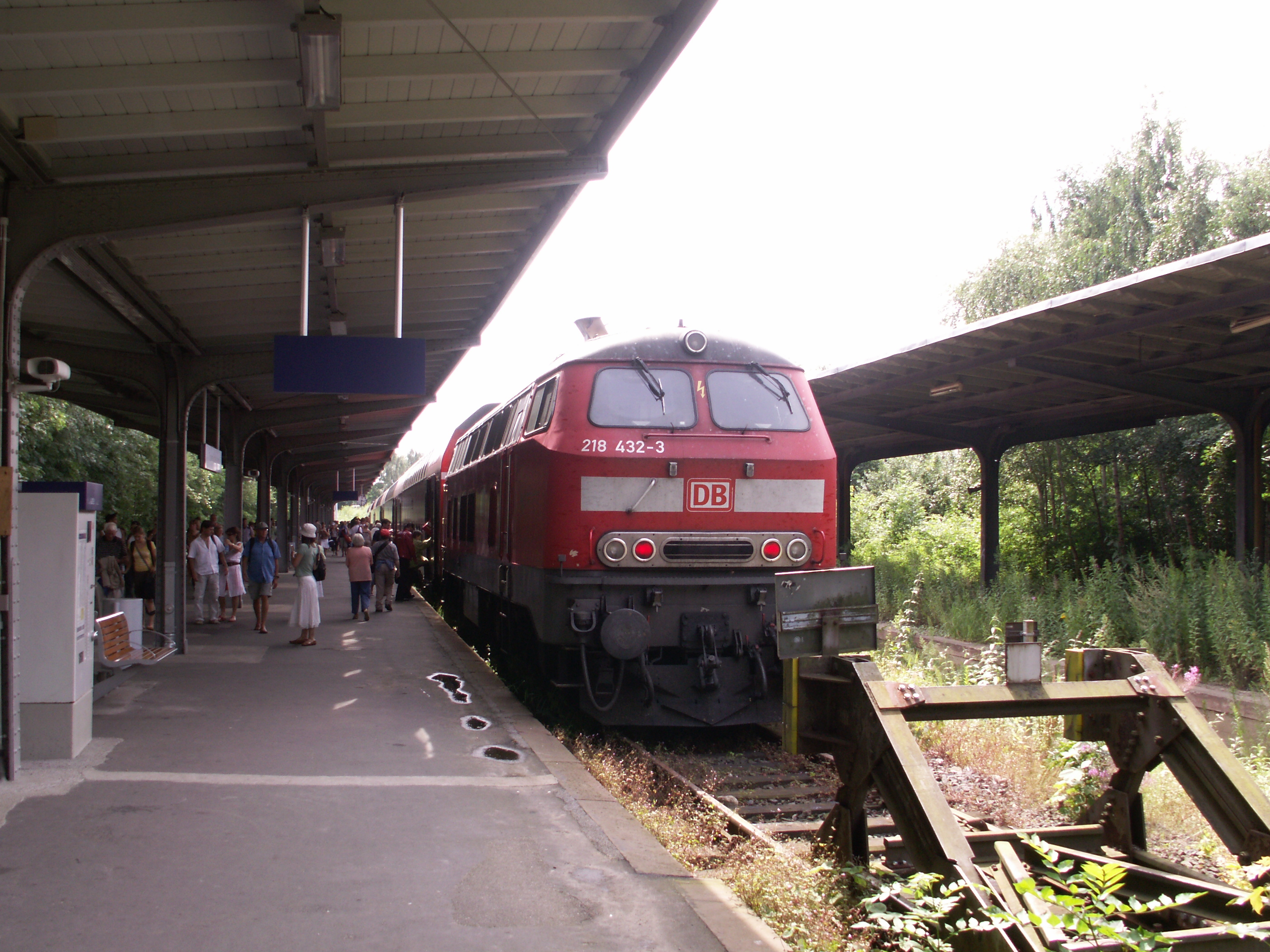
Class 218 in Strand station

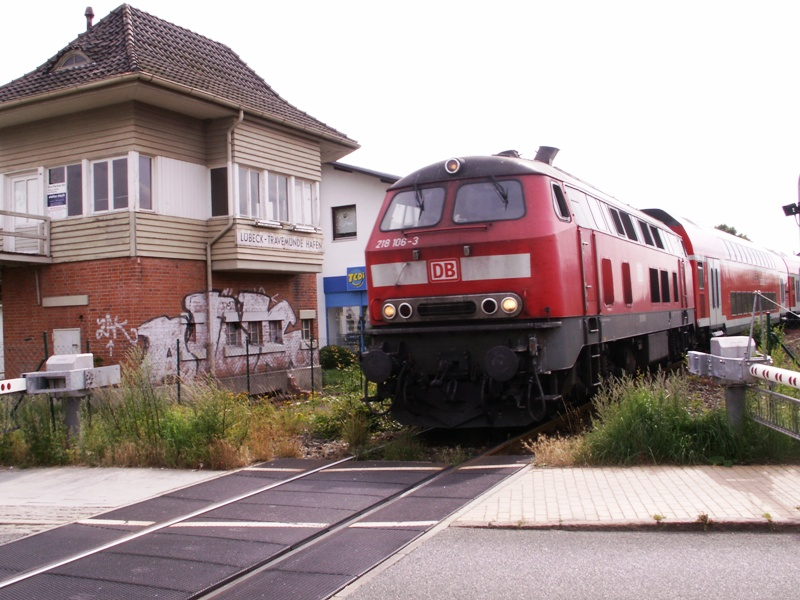
Class 218 at Hafen station signal box

In May 1936, the LBE began operating streamlined express trains with double-deck carriages on the Hamburg Hauptbahnhof–Lübeck–Travemünde Strand route, which attracted worldwide attention. They consisted of push–pull trains with control cars equipped with automatic Scharfenberg couplers and two units had a common Jacobs bogie. The eight streamlined express trains with double-deck carriages were purchased from Waggon- und Maschinenbau AG Görlitz (WUMAG) and Linke-Hofmann. They were hauled by a fast, streamlined tender locomotive, which could be remotely controlled by the driver from the other end of the train.

The LBE double-deck carriages offered great comfort for that time, such as padded seats in third class. Larger luggage was taken by porters on boarding and stowed in the luggage compartment and returned when its owner left the train.

Deutsche Bundesbahn continued to operate push-pull trains particularly in the 1960s and 1970s for Regional services to Hamburg, which were hauled by class 220 locomotives. Local transport to Lübeck was operated for a long time with class 211 diesel locomotives with three-axle converted vans with express control cars of yl class.

The section between Lübeck-Travemünde Hafen and Niendorf stations was operated with Uerdingen railbuses from the 1950s to the closing and abandonment of the line.

Passenger services were converted from diesel-haulage to electrical operation on 13–14 December 2008. Previously on summer weekends, trains were operated as push-pull trains with up to seven double-deck carriage hauled by class 218 diesel locomotives. In periods of low demand, especially in the winter, services were operated with diesel railcar of class 628. Following the electrification of the line, the diesel locomotives were replaced with class 112 locomotives.

The freight is hauled with class 232 diesel locomotives.

The line is currently (as of 2016) served every hour on weekdays with Regionalbahn services on line RB 86, running between Lübeck Hauptbahnhof and Lübeck-Travemünde Strand and operated by Regionalbahn Schleswig-Holstein (a DB Regio brand) with Alstom Coradia LINT 41 (class 648) sets. In the summer season, on weekends, public holidays and during Travemünde Week, loco-hauled Regional-Express services also run as line RE 8 from Hamburg Hauptbahnhof via Lübeck Hauptbahnhof to Lübeck-Travemünde Strand.
