= Lübeck Hauptbahnhof =

Railway station in Lübeck, Germany

Lübeck Hbf
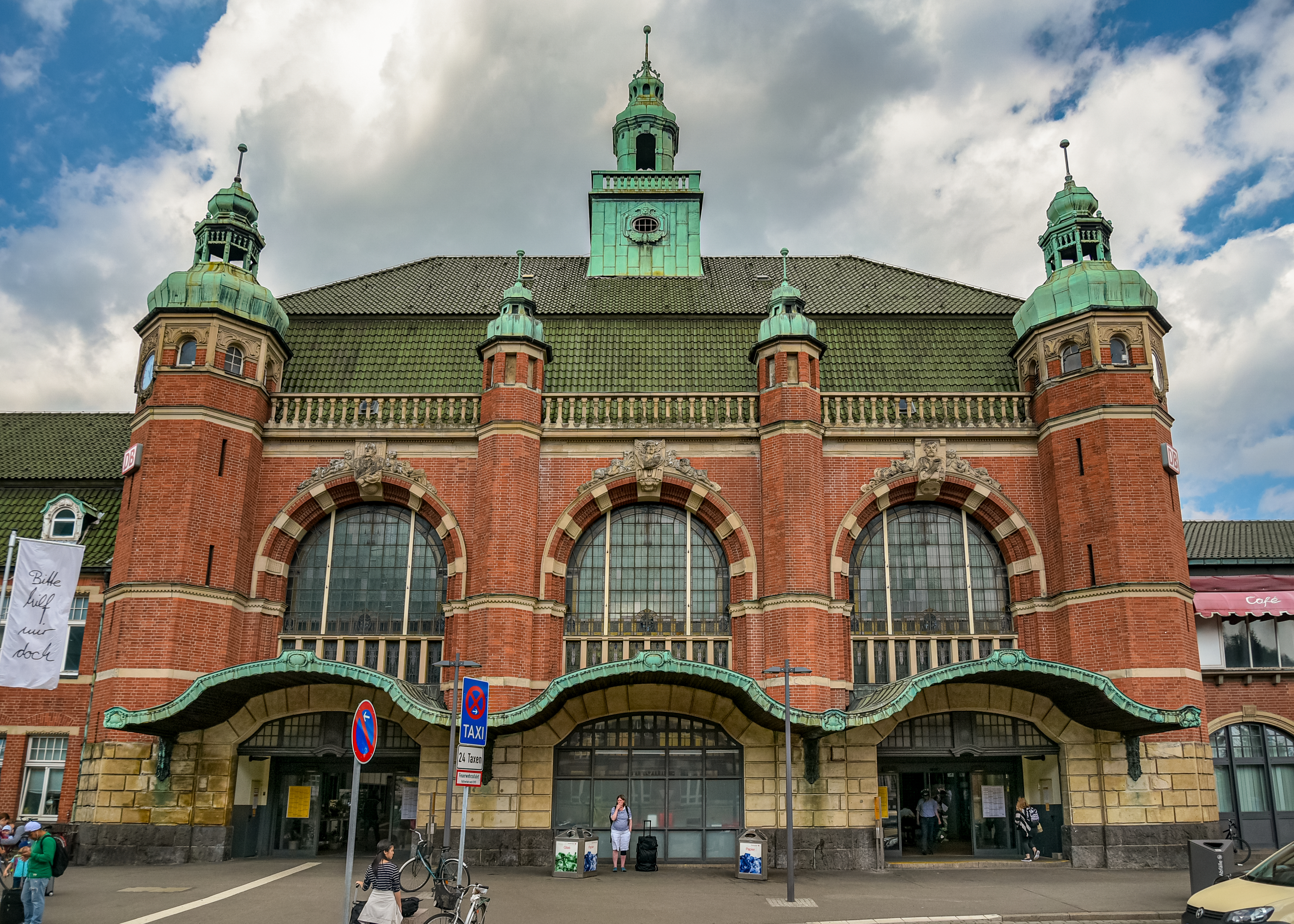
- Reception building of the Lübeck Hauptbahnhof

General information
- Location: Lübeck, Schleswig-Holstein; Germany
- Coordinates: 53°52′02″N 10°40′09″E
- Owner: Deutsche Bahn
- Operator: DB InfraGO
- Lines: Lübeck – Bad Oldesloe – Hamburg (KBS 104, 140); Lübeck – Kiel (KBS 145); Lübeck – Neustadt(Holst) (KBS 140); Lübeck – Lübeck-Travemünde Strand (KBS 104); Lübeck – Bad Kleinen (KBS 175); Lübeck – Büchen – Lüneburg (KBS 145)

Construction
- Architect: Fritz Klingholz

Other information
- Station code: 3807
- DS100 code: AL
- Category: 2
- Website: www.bahnhof.de

History
- Opened: 1 May 1908
- Electrified: 13 December 2008; 17 years ago, 15 kV 16 2/3 Hz AC system (overhead)

Passengers
- 31,000

Services
| Preceding station | DB Regio Nord | Following station |
|---|---|---|
| Lübeck-Moisling towards Hamburg Hbf | RE 8 | Lübeck-Dänischburg IKEA towards Lübeck-Travemünde Strand |
| Lübeck-Moisling towards Hamburg Hbf | RE 80 | Terminus |
| Terminus | RB 85 | Bad Schwartau towards Neustadt (Holst) |
| Terminus | RB 86 | Lübeck Dänischburg IKEA towards Lübeck-Travemünde Strand |
| Preceding station | DB Regio Nordost | Following station |
| Lübeck-St. Jürgen towards Pasewalk | RE 4 | Terminus |
| Preceding station | | Following station |
| Lübeck Hochschulstadtteil towards Lüneburg | RE 83 | Bad Schwartau towards Kiel Hbf |
| Terminus | RB 84 | Bad Schwartau towards Kiel Hbf |
Location

Lübeck Hauptbahnhof (German for Lübeck main station) is the main railway station serving the Hanseatic city of Lübeck, in the German state of Schleswig-Holstein. It is a through station at the western edge of the city centre. With around 31,000 travelers and visitors each day, Lübeck Hbf is the busiest of all the railway stations in Schleswig-Holstein. It is classified by the Deutsche Bahn as a category 2 station.

The present station building was built in 1908 by the Lübeck-Büchener Eisenbahn (LBE). At that time, the LBE operated most of the railway connections around Lübeck, including the express trains. The station building was designed by Fritz Klingholz, and replaced the previous, outdated building.

Lübeck Hbf is a Reiterbahnhof, or station with a reception building laid out as a bridge "riding" over the tracks. Its reception building spans a total of 10 tracks with four platforms. A special feature is its wide wooden steps leading down to the platforms. The station was recently modernised and completely electrified, and is now fully connected with Germany's electric railway network.

== History ==
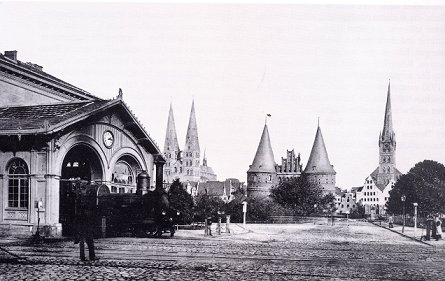
Train leaving the old Hauptbahnhof, about 1865

=== Old Hauptbahnhof ===
The forerunner of today's Hauptbahnhof was built by the LBE in 1851, on the wall peninsula near the Holstentor. Initially, it had only one platform, but due to later expansion work, ended up with four platforms. With increasing traffic, operations became problematic, as the trains crossed a main road directly after leaving the station, and the tracks needed to pass over several small streams. Upon the commissioning of the new Hauptbahnhof in 1908, the old station building finally lost its function.

After being put to various other uses (including the housing of the Harbour Railway administration), the old station building was demolished in 1934, as part of the transformation of the Holstentorplatz.

=== Origins of the modern Hauptbahnhof ===
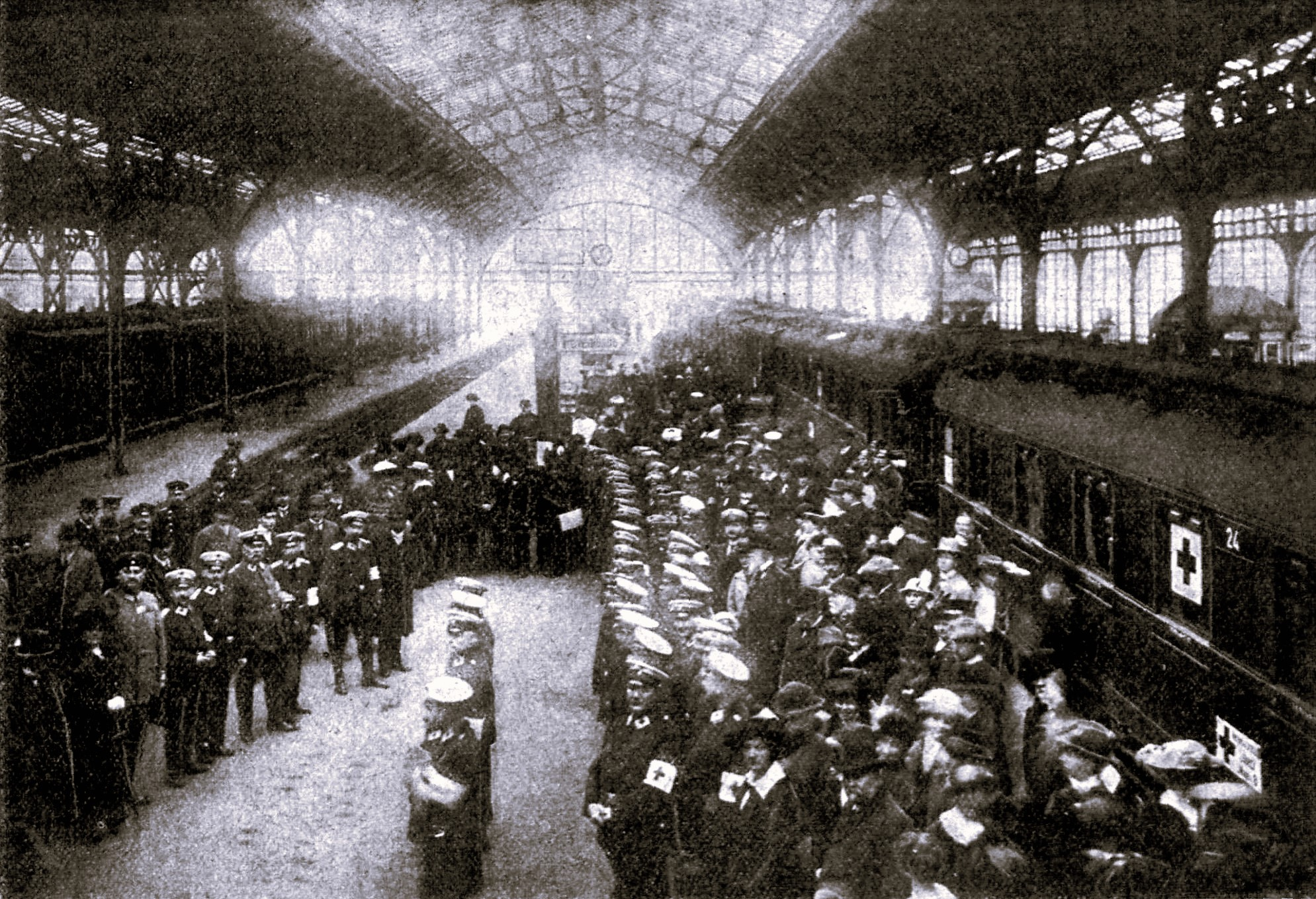
Departure of the hospital train from Lübeck on October 27, 1914

As was evident by the turn of the 20th century, the old station building was too small, so a new location was sought.

The problematic layout of the Lübeck inner city, which is situated on an island, had already caused great difficulties for the construction and operation of the original station. Thus, the new station site needed to be just outside the inner city to be able to solve these problems.

A suitable location was finally found in the Rethteich Meadows, a few hundred metres west of the inner city, near the St. Lawrence Church. The new station, built to a design by Fritz Klingholz, was finally opened in 1908, and the tracks slewed to the new location.

On the evening of 6 November 1918 every higher officer in Lübeck became interned in the Hotel International (Am Bahnhof N. 17).

During World War II, the main building and the train shed remained largely intact. However, in the bombing of 29 March 1942, the passenger bridge took some hits, which partially burned out, and the station wing was rebuilt in simplified form.

=== Bundesbahn era ===
From 1945 to 1990, Lübeck Hbf was a border station adjacent to what was, initially, the Soviet occupation zone, and later the German Democratic Republic. The Bundesgrenzschutz had its own border-inspection facilities on the easternmost platform, and this had to be passed by passengers departing from Lübeck. The Interzonal trains operated about once or twice daily to Rostock. They came usually from Hamburg or Cologne.

From 14 May 1963 onwards, Lübeck Hbf's most significant attribute was that it had become an important station on the Vogelfluglinie from Hamburg to Scandinavia. Numerous express trains with long itineraries served the station. Among them were the Italia Express and the Alpen Express, which operated between Rome and Copenhagen, and the Trans Europ Express Merkur, which ran from Stuttgart to Copenhagen.

The branch line to Segeberg, which had its platform next to the train hall, had its passenger traffic withdrawn on 26 September 1964, and was closed on 31 December 1967.

In 1967, on the occasion of the visit of Shah Reza Pahlavi to the city of Lübeck, the station was restored. The modifications then carried out corresponded with the spirit of the times, but were later perceived as being of dubious aesthetic value. They were removed during the 2003 renovations. Amongst other things, the passage to the station wing was closed, windows were bricked up, and the interior of the train hall was strengthened. Also installed during the Bundesbahn era was the metal luggage bridge, which obstructed the view of the station from the railway bridge.

=== Developments after the Wende ===
After the opening of the combined road/rail Great Belt Bridge in Denmark in the late 1990s, Lübeck Hbf became a less important station for international traffic, as the new bridge made the longer route via Flensburg more attractive. At the same time, an increasingly substantial decline of the station was due to the reluctance of Deutsche Bahn to invest in Lübeck. Thus, the Lübeck Hbf of the late 1990s was still equipped with hand-operated semaphore signals, lack of care for the station building had become apparent, and Lübeck had become the largest German city not served by an electrified railway line. Additionally, the station wing looked decrepit, after its restaurant had had to close. By 2000, the entire building was completely outdated and no longer met the requirements of modern rail operations.

The turnaround in the policy of the Deutsche Bahn for the Lübeck area came in 2003. In that year, all the semaphore signals were replaced with centralized Ks- signals. At the same time, work began on a large-scale reconstruction of the station, to modernize and prepare it for future electrification. The most important modifications were completed on 20 July 2007.

Electrification of the Lübeck–Hamburg and Lübeck–Lübeck-Travemünde Strand railways, and therefore also of Lübeck Hbf, was begun in late 2006 and finished in December 2008. On 1 October 2008, the power was turned on.

== Reconstruction work ==
In 2003, after much hesitation, the Deutsche Bahn initiated a comprehensive modernisation of Lübeck Hbf. In carrying out the modernisation, the DB was required to observe rules of heritage building preservation. The work involved the complete reconstruction of the reception building and train hall, and the basic restoration of the pedestrian bridge.

Most work was completed by 20 July 2007. The official inauguration took place on 13 December 2008, to commemorate the station's centenary. Seven businesses moved into premises on the pedestrian bridge, including a fast food restaurant, a bookshop, and a pretzel baker. The old luggage bridge was removed in April 2008. With the relocation of the travel center to the north wing of the building, establishing a passage to the main hall, construction was practically completed. The south wing, which already had a connection with the main hall, is intended in the future to host further businesses.

A further construction project, not yet completed by 2009, is the conversion of the ground floor of the north station wing, which has been empty for some years, because of the closure of the restaurant, and later the nightclub, formerly located in that wing. The basement is now occupied by the travel centre.

== Electrification ==
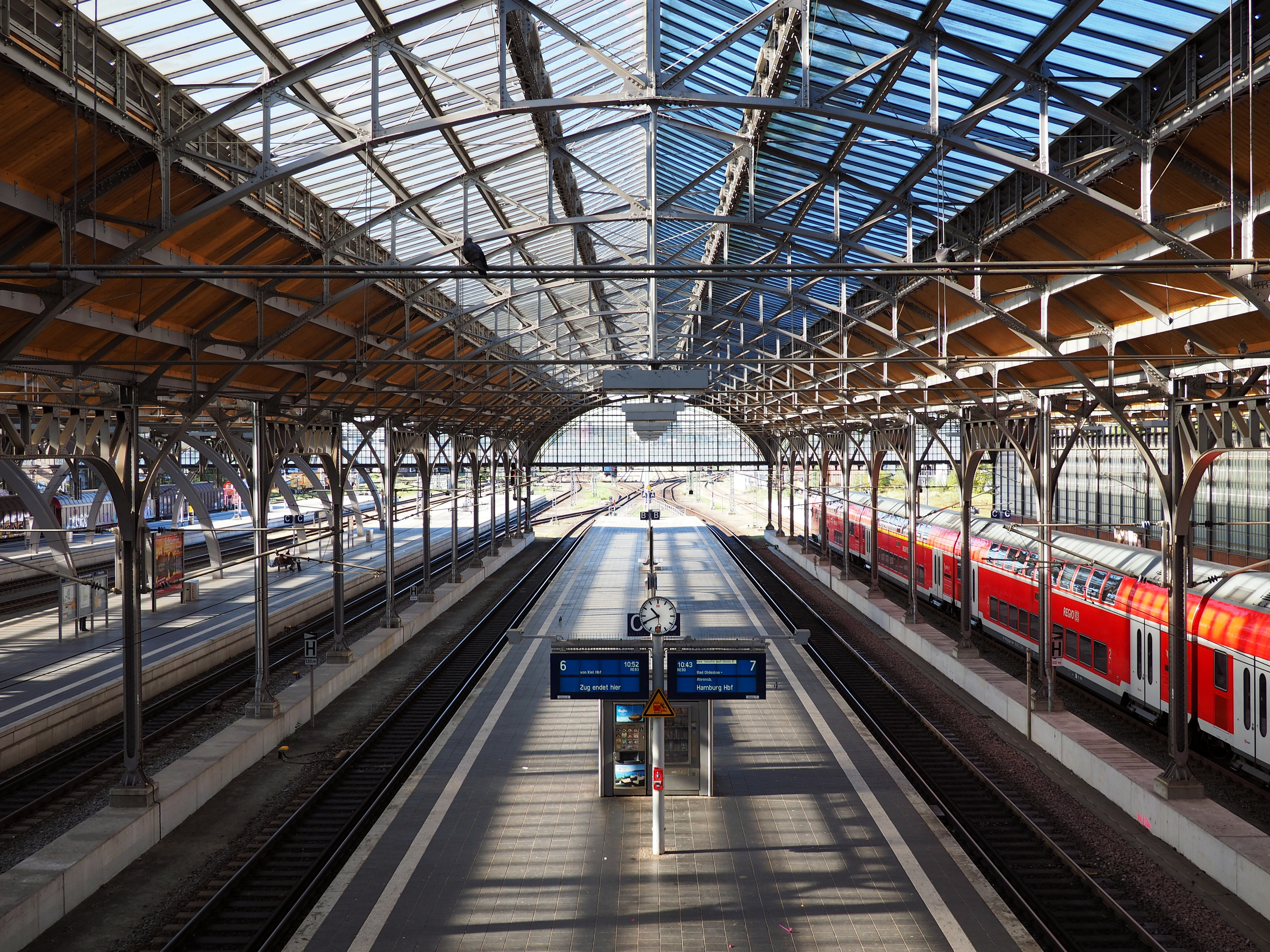
Platforms 6 and 7 in 2015

For a long time, Lübeck was the largest German city without an electrified rail connection. From the 1970s, the city sought to be connected to the electric rail network. However, the initial response was that Lübeck was located in the zone boundary area, right on the border with East Germany, and Deutsche Bahn had a policy against it. This policy stance finally ended in 2005, when a contract for electrification was officially signed. In it, the electrification of the Hamburg-Lübeck-Travemünde railway was agreed.

Apart from its assistance to passenger traffic, the integration of Lübeck into the electric rail network was particularly beneficial to the ever-increasing freight traffic between the Lübeck ports and Hamburg. The electrification contract included duplication of the section of line between Bad Schwartau Waldhalle and Lübeck-Kücknitz. As a source of electricity for the newly electrified line, a new substation was constructed in Lübeck-Genin, instead of the railway power lines that would otherwise have been required to connect the line with existing substations.

The new electrified line was energised on 1 October 2008, and officially commissioned on schedule on 14 December 2008.

== Traffic ==
At one stage, six railway lines radiated from Lübeck Hbf. Of those six lines, only the Lübeck-Segeberger Eisenbahn, opened in 1916 to Bad Segeberg, has been closed. That closure, as far as passenger traffic is concerned, took place in 1964.

The following railways lead to Lübeck Hbf:

- Hamburg–Bad Oldesloe–Reinfeld–Lübeck (Lübeck–Hamburg railway); opened in 1865 by the Lübeck-Büchener Eisenbahn (LBE), now part of Kursbuchstrecken (KBS) 104 and 140.
- Lüneburg–Büchen–Lübeck (Lübeck–Lüneburg railway); opened in 1851 by the LBE, today KBS 145.
- Bad Kleinen–Lübeck (Lübeck-Bad Kleinen railway); opened in 1870 by the Grand Duchy of Mecklenburg Friedrich-Franz Railway (MFFE), today KBS 150.
- Lübeck-Travemünde-Strand–Lübeck (Lübeck–Lübeck-Travemünde Strand railway); opened in 1882 by the LBE, today part of KBS 140.
- Neustadt–Lübeck (Vogelfluglinie); opened in 1925 by the Deutsche Reichsbahn (DRG), today KBS 141. Puttgarden–Lübeck is suspended until around 2029.
- Kiel–Eutin–Bad Schwartau–Lübeck (Kiel–Lübeck railway), opened in 1873 by the Eutin-Lübecker Eisenbahn-Gesellschaft (ELE), today part of KBS 140.

Currently, international connections exist between Lübeck Hbf and Szczecin in Poland via Bad Kleinen, Neubrandenburg, and Pasewalk, operated by Regional-Express trains. Due to their long itineraries, these trains have the character of Heckeneilzug services.

Some of the long-distance travellers at Lübeck Hbf take a train to Lübeck-Travemünde Skandinavienkai, to connect with one of the ferries to Sweden or Finland.

The majority of the passenger train traffic to and from Lübeck Hbf is carried by commuter trains on the line between Hamburg Hauptbahnhof and Lübeck, operated by DB Regio. During peak hours, trains on this line are timed at 30-minute intervals. On all other lines that operate to Lübeck Hauptbahnhof, trains generally operate at hourly intervals.

== Services ==
In the 2026 timetable, the following services stop at the station:

| Line | Train route |
|---|---|
| RE 4 | Lübeck – Bad Kleinen – Güstrow – Pasewalk (Szczecin / Ueckermünde) |
| RE 8 RE 80 | Lübeck– Reinfeld (Holst.) – Bad Oldesloe – (Ahrensburg) – Hamburg |
| RE 83 | Kiel – Raisdorf – Preetz – Plön – Bad Malente-Gremsmühlen – Eutin – Bad Schwartau – Lübeck– Lübeck-Hochschulstadtteil – Lübeck Flughafen (Airport) – Ratzeburg – Mölln – Büchen – Lauenburg (Elbe) – Echem – Lüneburg |
| RB 84 | Kiel – Kiel-Elmschenhagen – Raisdorf – Preetz – Ascheberg – Plön – Bad Malente-Gremsmühlen – Eutin – Pönitz – Pansdorf – Bad Schwartau – Lübeck |
| RB 85 | Lübeck – Bad Schwartau – Timmendorfer Strand – Scharbeutz – Haffkrug – Sierksdorf – Neustadt in Holstein |
| RE 8 RB 86 | Hamburg – Lübeck – Lübeck-Dänischburg IKEA – Lübeck-Kücknitz – Lübeck-Travemünde Skandinavienkai – Lübeck-Travemünde Hafen – Lübeck-Travemünde Strand |
| RE 4 | Lübeck – Lübeck-St. Jürgen – Herrnburg – Schönberg (Meckl.) – Grevesmühlen – Bad Kleinen – Bützow – Güstrow – Neubrandenburg – Pasewalk – Szczecin Główny |

== Bus connections ==
Near the station, and accessible via a recently widened passageway through a row of houses, is Lübeck's central bus station (ZOB), with services operated by Stadtverkehr Lübeck, Autokraft, and Dahmetal.

== See also ==
- Rail transport in Germany
- Railway stations in Germany
