= List of Deutsche Bahn AG locomotives and railbuses =

This list provides an overview of the motive power operated by Deutsche Bahn. It only includes those vehicles that have been in service with the Deutsche Bahn AG since its formation on 1 January 1994.

The classes are numbered according to the locomotive classification of the Deutsche Bundesbahn, which had been adopted by Deutsche Bahn in 1994.

Since 2007, classifications for all German railway companies are centrally issued by the Federal Railway Office in line with UIC classification rules.

== Steam locomotives ==
Several narrow gauge steam locomotives were taken over by Deutsche Bahn, which until 2004 were handed over to communal services or heritage railways.

Class	Previous class	Quantity	Remarks
099 701–713	Saxon IV K	5	Sold by 2004
099 720	Saxon VI K	1	To BVO Bahn in 2004
099 722–735	DRG Class 99.73-76	14	Sold by 2004
099 736–757	DR Class 99.77-79	21	Sold by 2004
099 760	TRUSETAL	1	To SOEG in 1996
099 770–771	RüKB Mh	2	To RüKB in 1995
099 780–781	KJI Nr. 20 and 21	2	To RüKB in 1995
099 901–903	DRG Class 99.32	3	To Bäderbahn Molli in 1995
099 904–905	DRG Class 99.33	2	To Bäderbahn Molli in 1995

== Electric locomotives ==
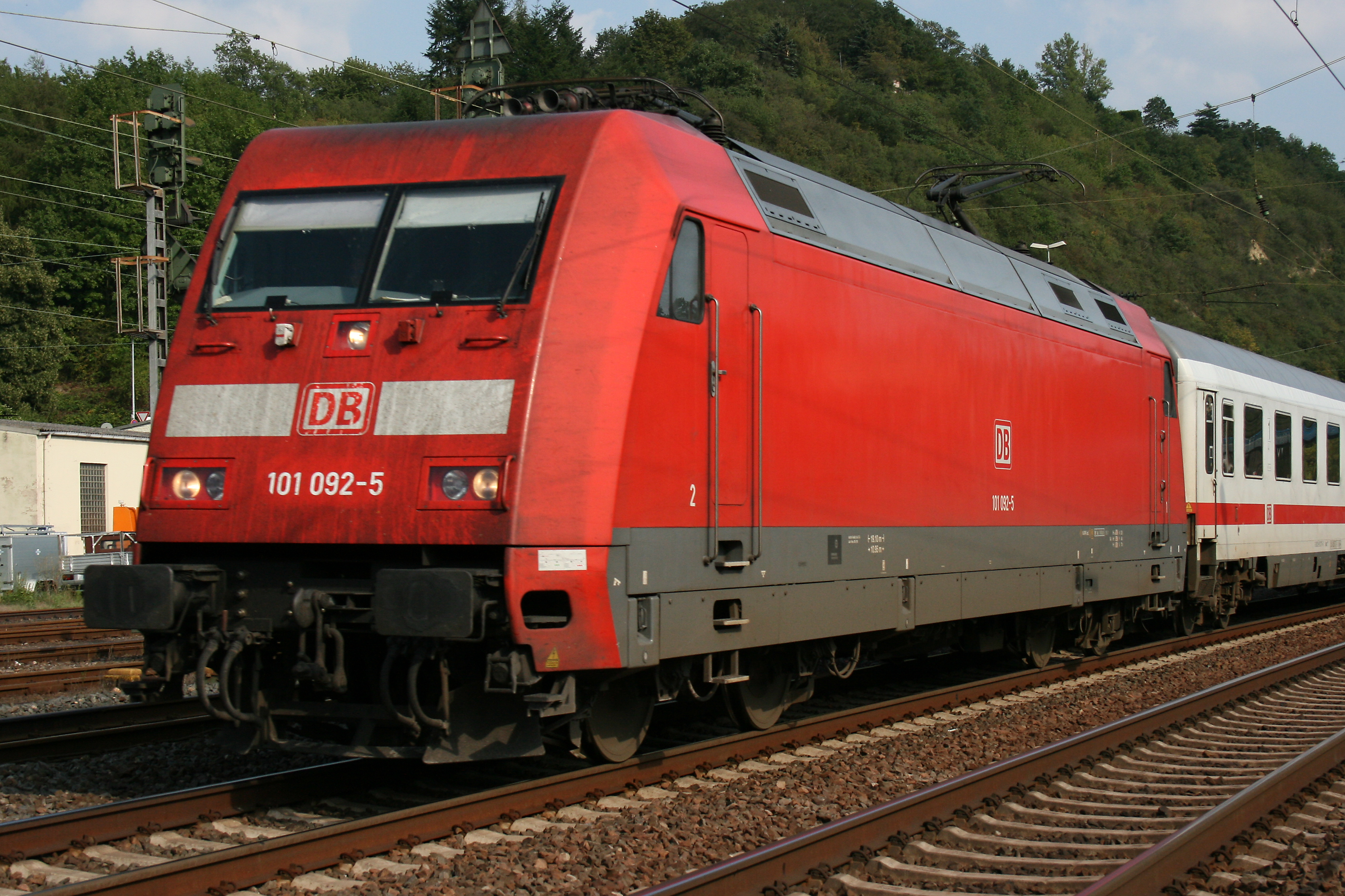
Class 101 engine on the right-hand Rhine track.

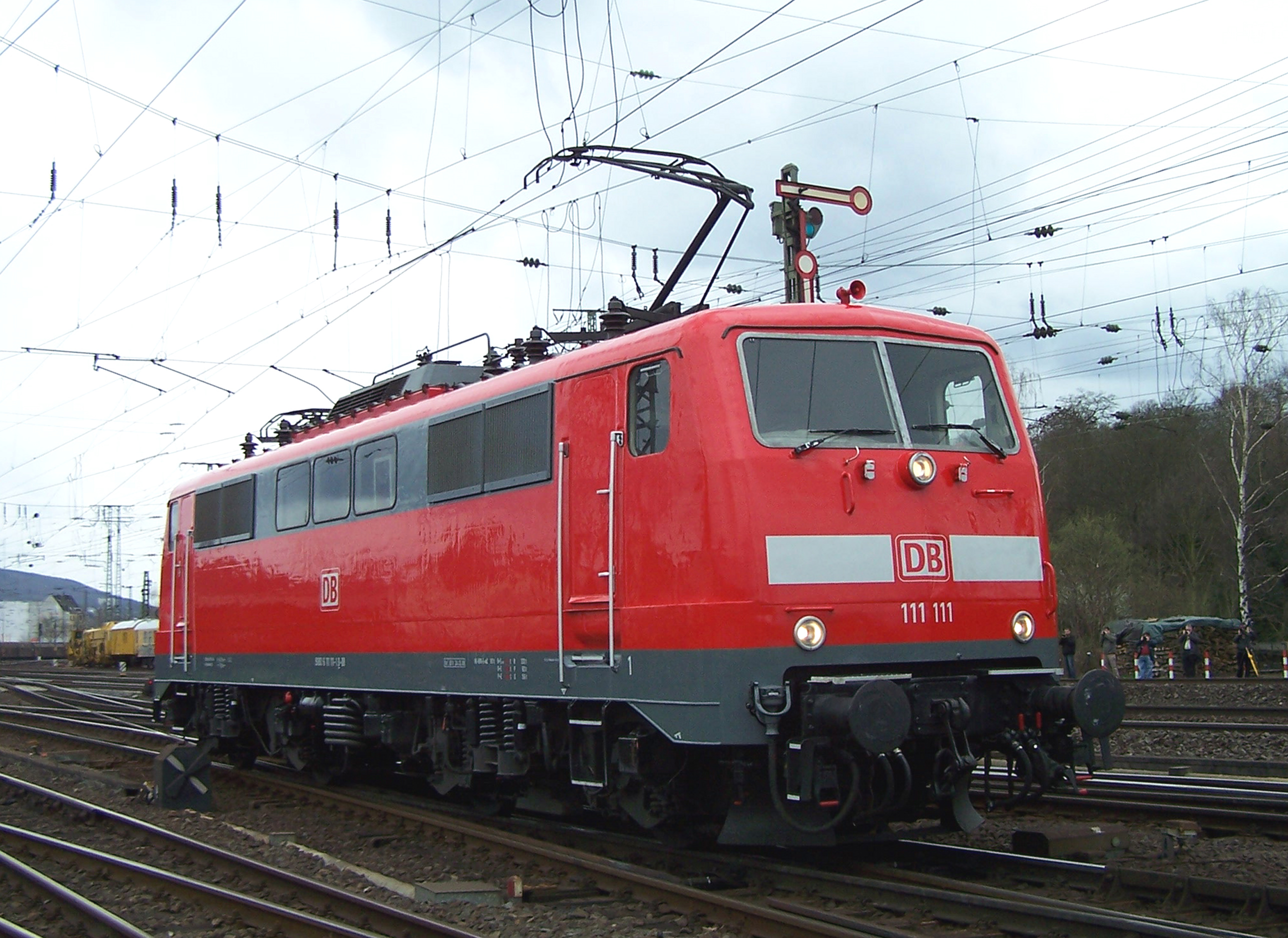
Class 111

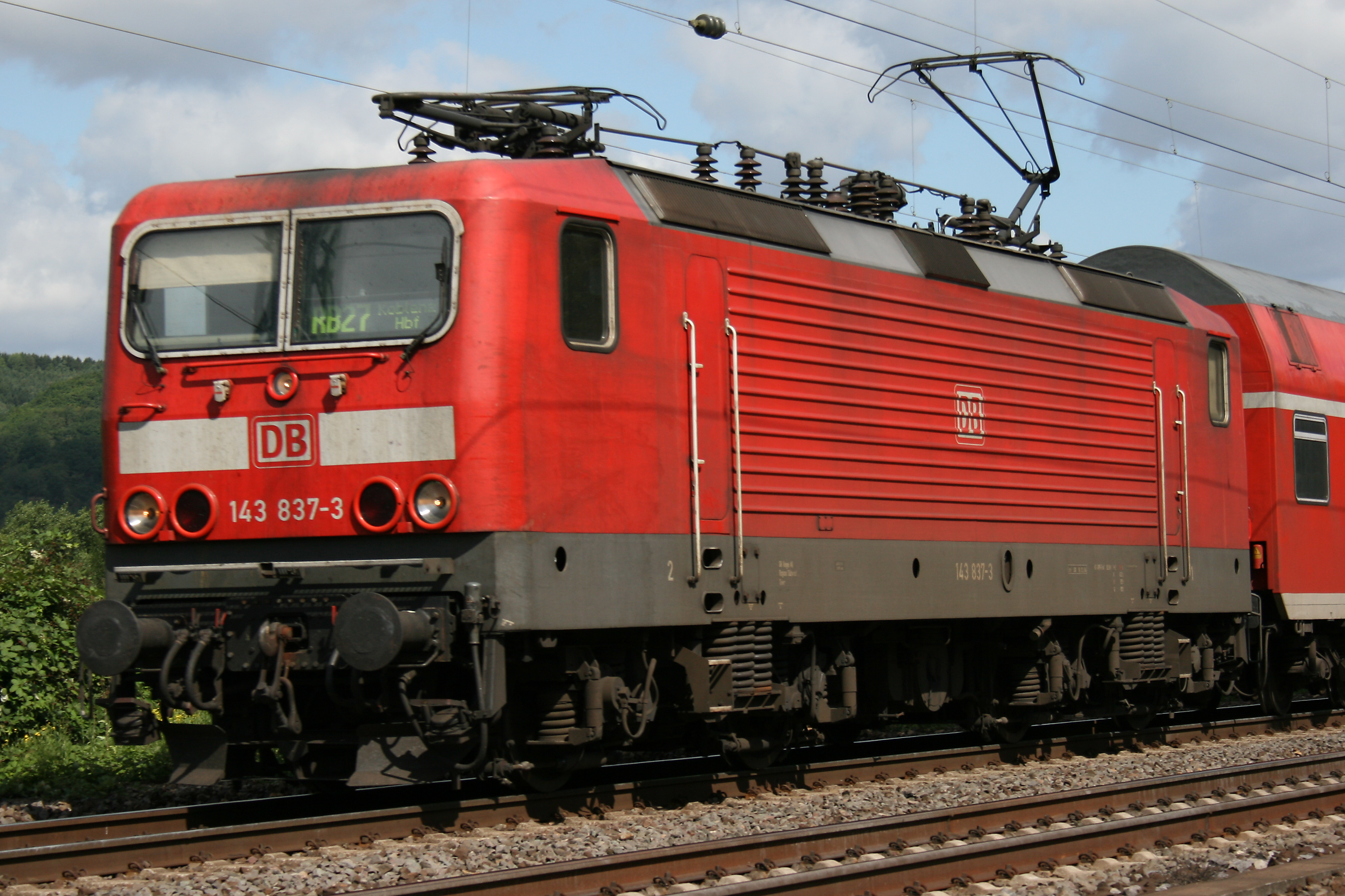
Class 143

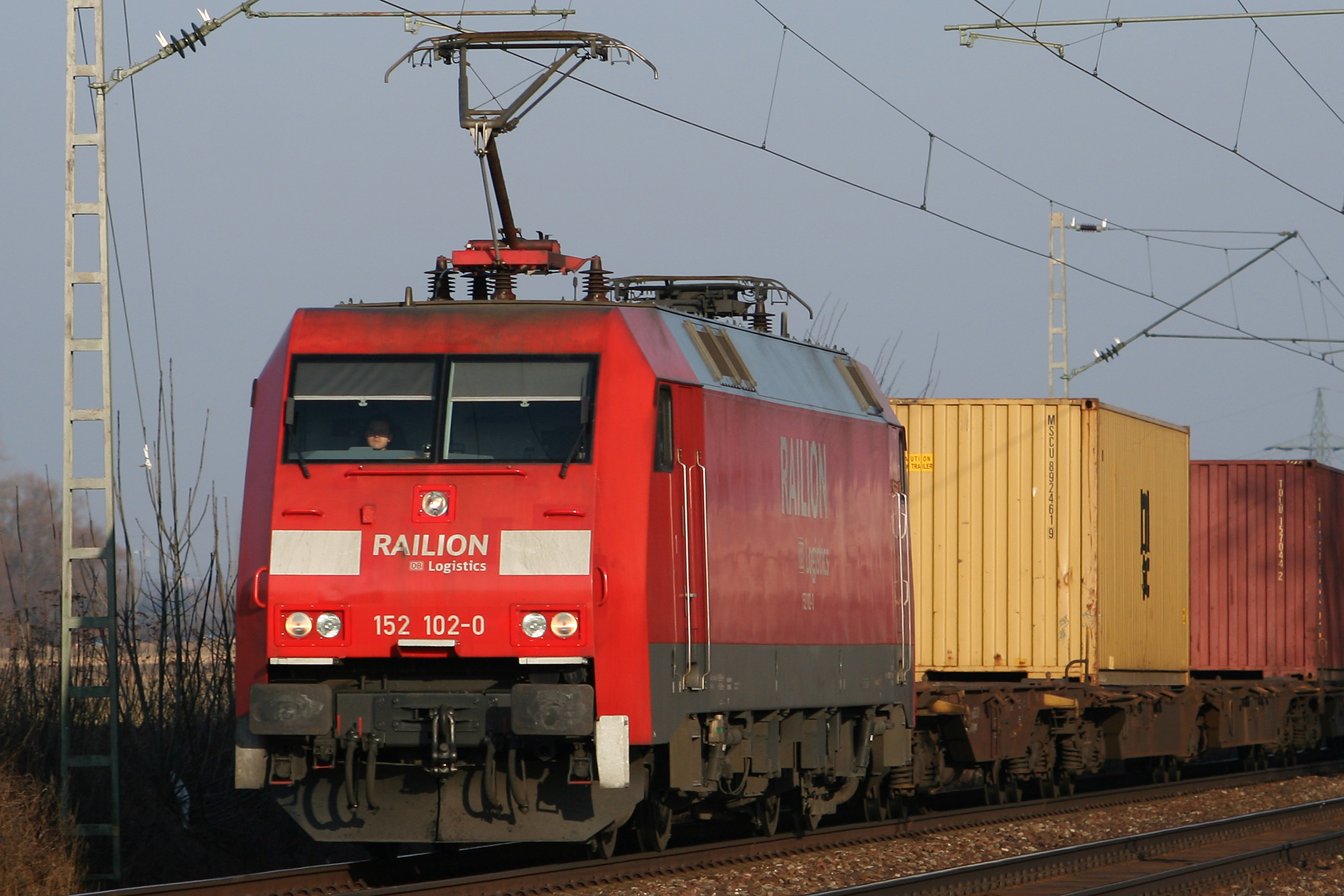
Class 152

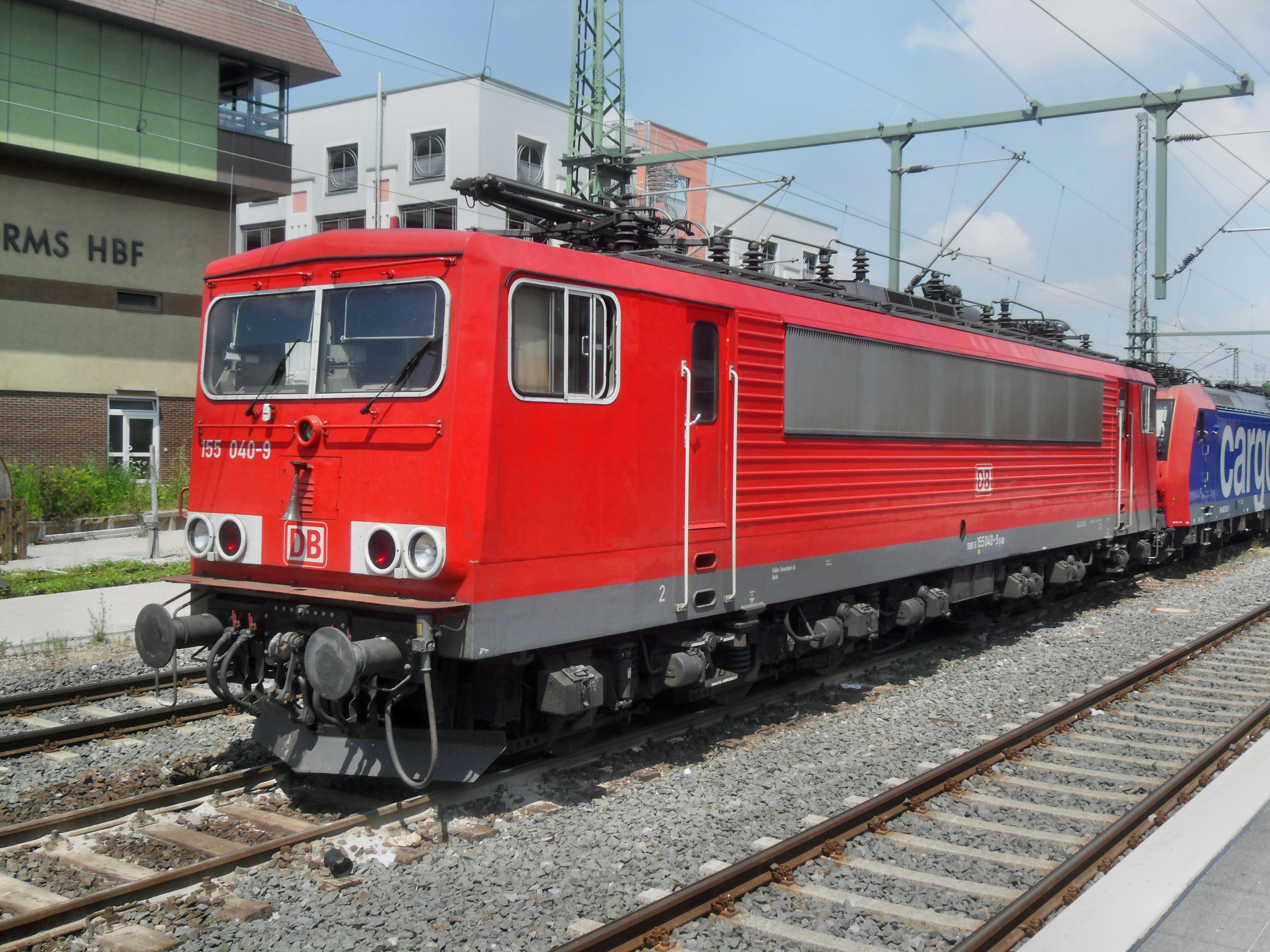
Class 155

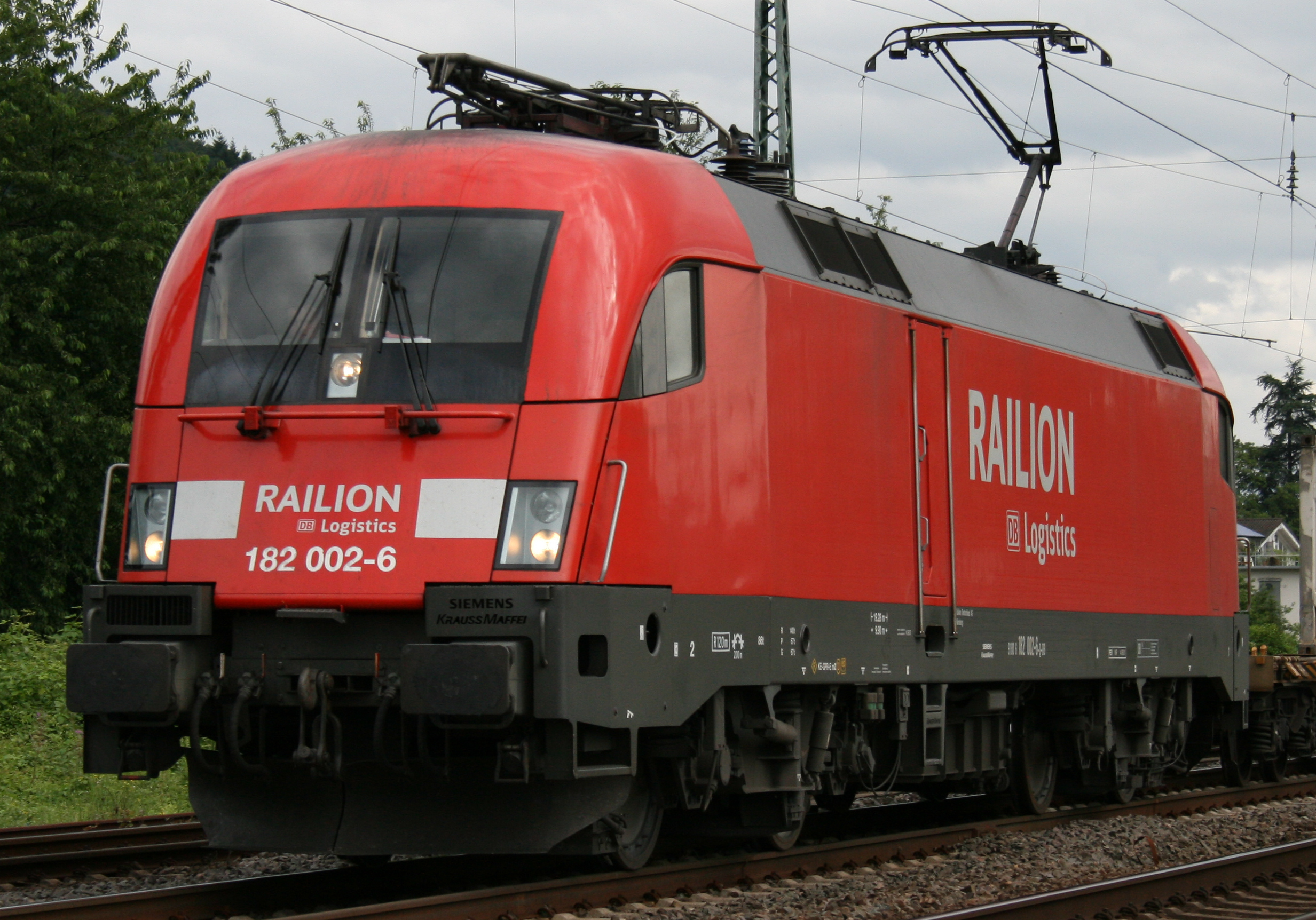
Class 182

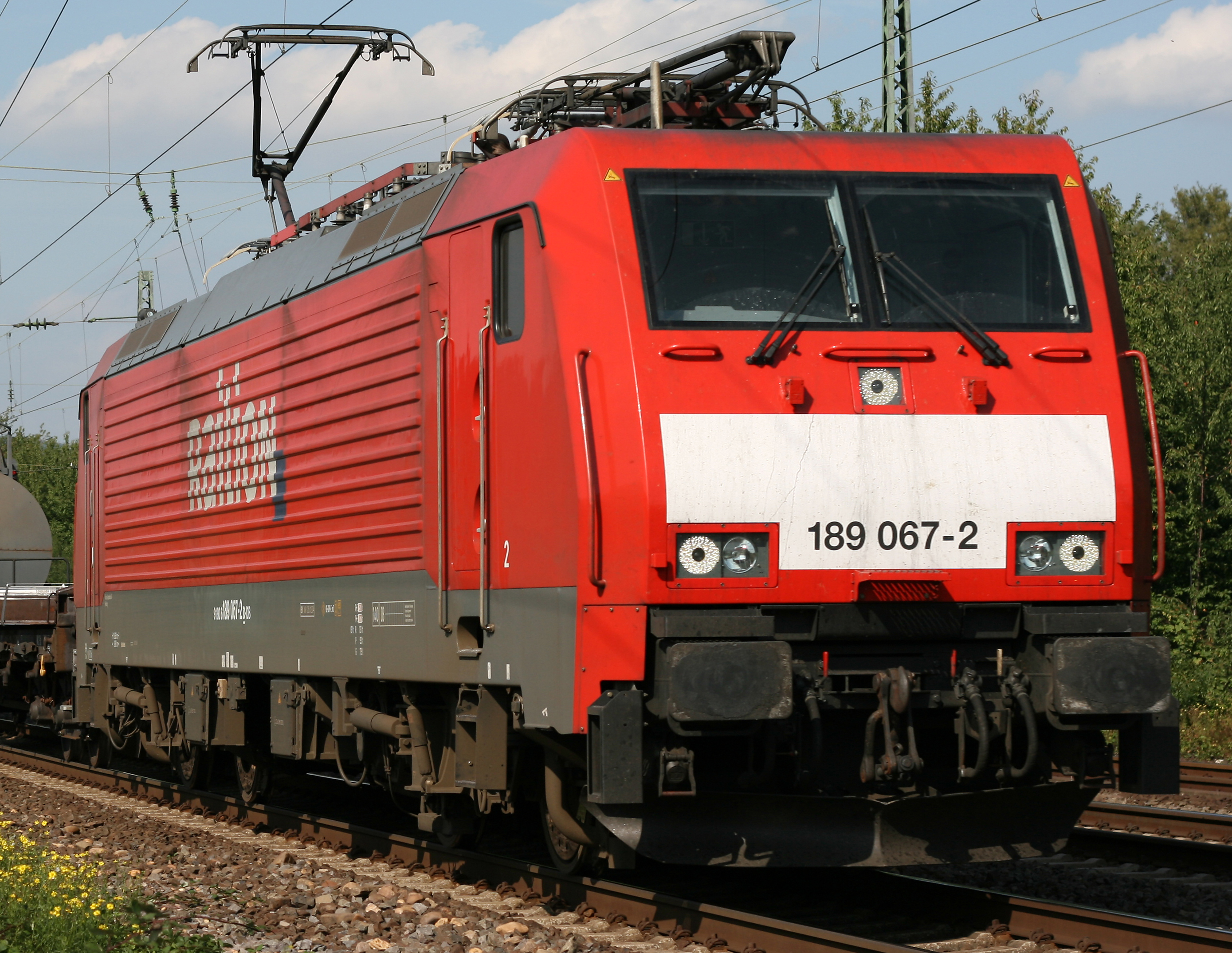
Class 189

Class	Name	Use	Remarks
101		Long-distance services	
102	Škoda 109E	Munich-Nuremberg-Express	
(103)		Long-distance services	Retired
105	Talgo Travca	Long-distance services (Talgo)	
(109)	ex DR 211		Retired
(110)	ex DB E 10	Previously used for long distances, regional services	Retired
111		Regional services, previously also S-Bahn	
(112)	ex DB E 10.12	Long-distance services	Reclassified to DB 113 or 114 respectively
112	ex DR/DB 112.1	Regional services	
(113)	ex DB 112	Regional services	Retired, High speed bogies
(114)	ex DB 112	Regional services	Converted to DB 110
114	ex DR/DB 112.0 ex DR 212.0	Regional services	
114.1; 114.3	ex DB 143 ex DR 243	Regional services	Conversion to higher velocities in planning
(115)	ex DB 110 ex DB 113	DB-Autozug (motorrail train)	Retired, Reclassified for auditorial reasons
(120)		Long-distance services	First three-phase electric power locomotive. Retired.
(127)	Siemens EuroSprinter	Prototype	No longer in stock
(128)	AEG 12X	Prototype	No longer in stock
(139)	ex DB E 40.11	Regional and goods services	Retired, DB 140 with electric brakes, partially converted DB 110
(140)	ex DB E 40	Goods services	Retired
(141)	ex DB E 41	Regional services	Retired
(142)	ex DR 242	Regional- and goods services	Retired
143	ex DR 243	S-Bahn, Regional services	
145	Bombardier TRAXX	Goods services	
146.0	Bombardier TRAXX	Regional services	
146.1	Bombardier TRAXX (P160 AC)	Regional services	
146.2	Bombardier TRAXX 2 (P160 AC2)	Regional services	
146.5	Bombardier TRAXX 2 (P160 AC2)	Long-distance services	
147	Bombardier TRAXX 3 (P160 AC3)	Long-distance and regional services	
(150)	ex DB E 50	Goods services	Retired
(151)		Goods services	
152	Siemens EuroSprinter (ES 64 F)	Goods services	
(155)	ex DR 250	Goods services	Retired
(156)	ex DR 252	Goods services	Sold to MEG
(171)	ex DR 251	Rübeland Railway	Retired, Mothballed, 25 kV 50 Hz ~ only
(180)	ex DR 230	Cross-border services (CZ, PL)	15 kV 16.7 Hz ~ and 3 kV =
(181)	ex DB E 310	Cross-border services (F, LUX)	Retired, 15 kV 16.7 Hz ~ and 25 kV 50 Hz ~
182	Siemens EuroSprinter (ES 64 U2 „Taurus“)	Regional services, Systemtechnik, Netz	15 kV 16.7 Hz ~ and 25 kV 50 Hz ~
(184)	ex DB E 410	Cross-border services (F, LUX, B, NL)	Retired, 15 kV 16.7 Hz ~, 25 kV 50 Hz ~, 1,5 kV = and 3 kV =
185.0	Bombardier TRAXX (F 140 AC)	International goods services	15 kV 16.7 Hz ~ and 25 kV 50 Hz ~
185.2	Bombardier TRAXX 2 (F 140 AC2)	International goods services	15 kV 16.7 Hz ~ and 25 kV 50 Hz ~
187	Bombardier TRAXX 3 (F 140 AC3)	Goods services	
189	Siemens EuroSprinter (ES 64 F4)	International goods services	15 kV 16.7 Hz ~, 25 kV 50 Hz ~, 1,5 kV = and 3 kV =
193	Siemens Vectron	International goods services, Systemtechnik, Regional service	partially rented from Dispolok, ELL Austria, 15 kV 16.7 Hz ~, 25 kV 50 Hz ~, 1,5 kV = and 3 kV =

== Diesel locomotives ==
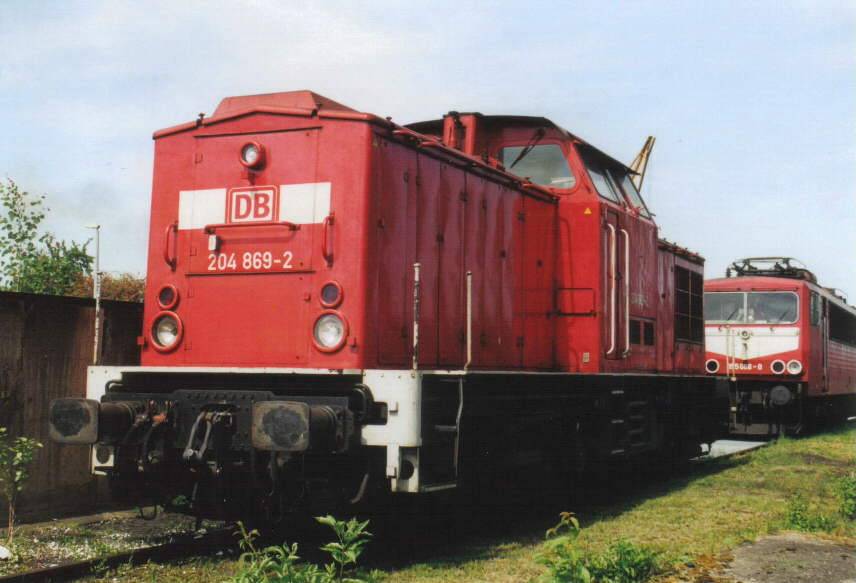
Class 204

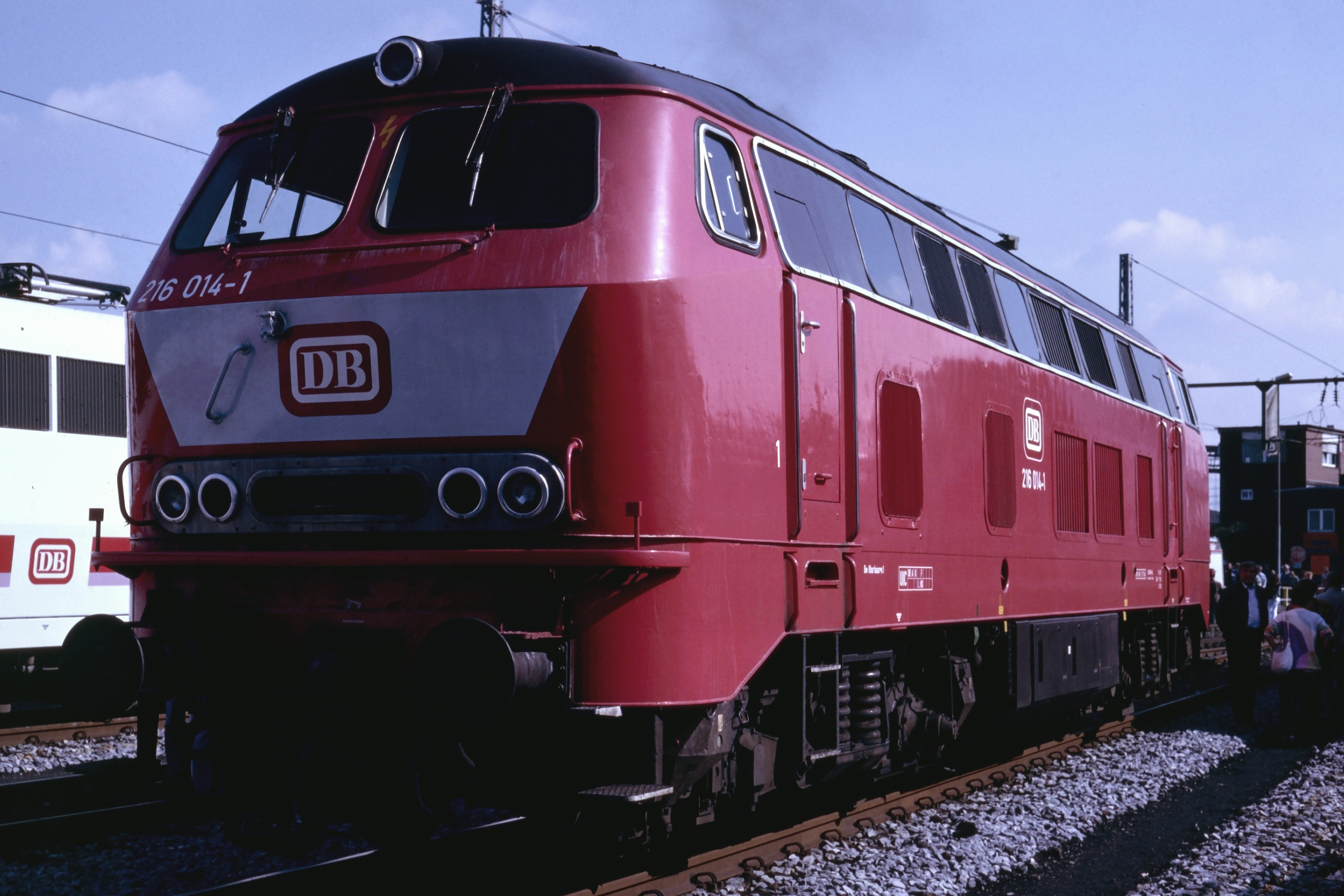
Class 216

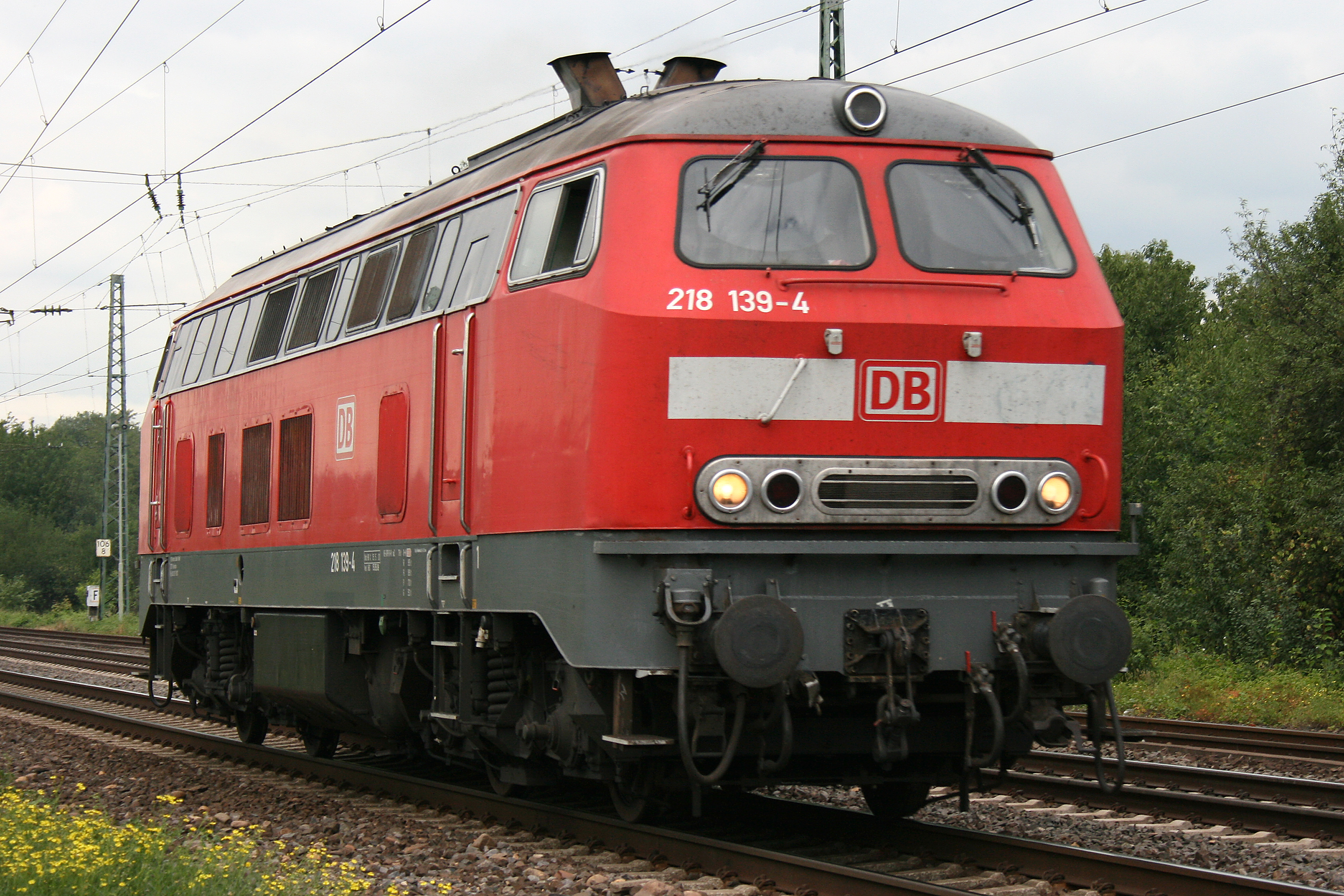
Class 218

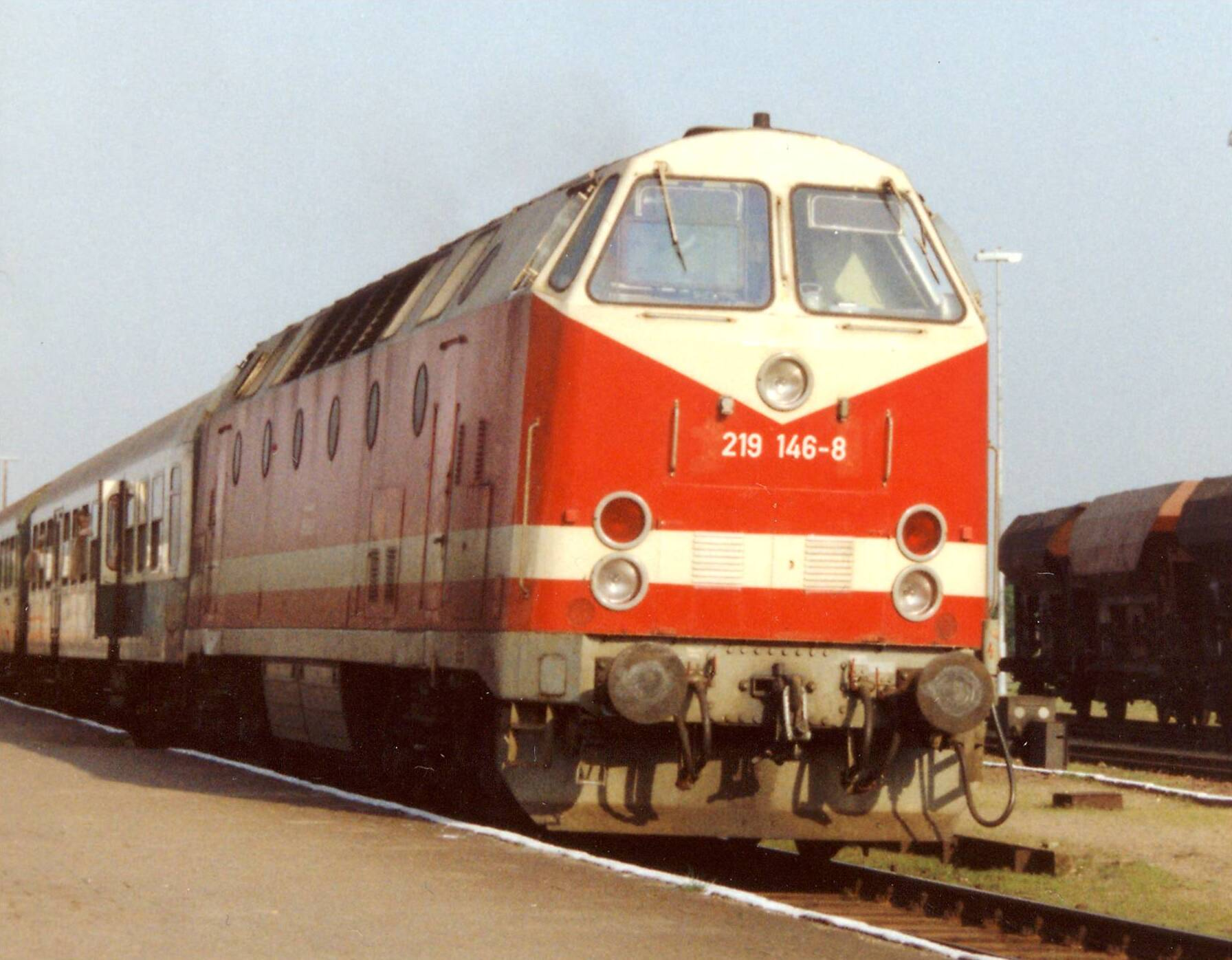
Class 219

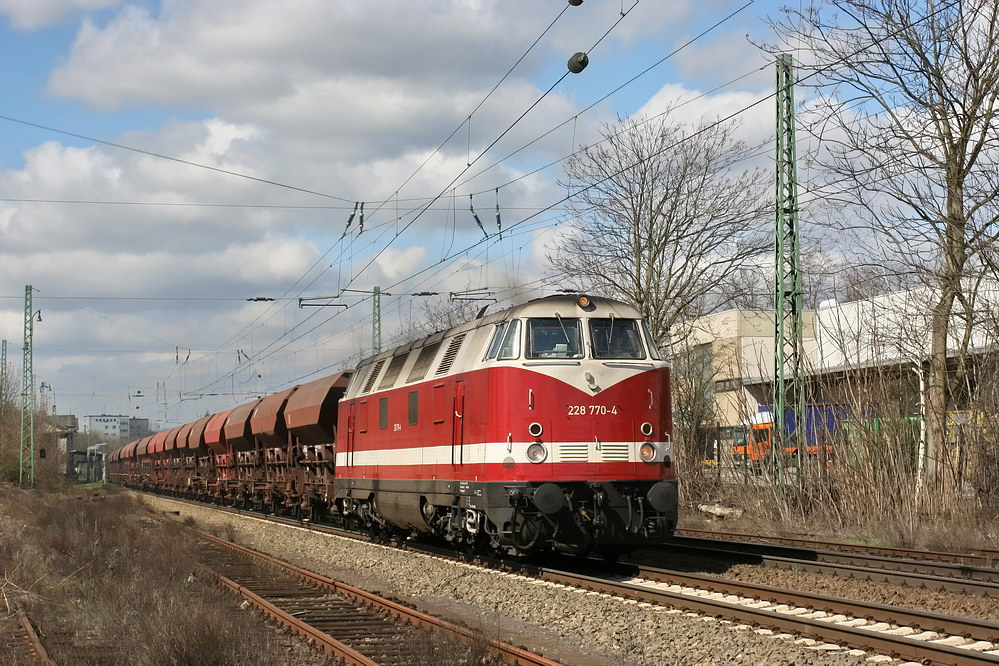
Class 228

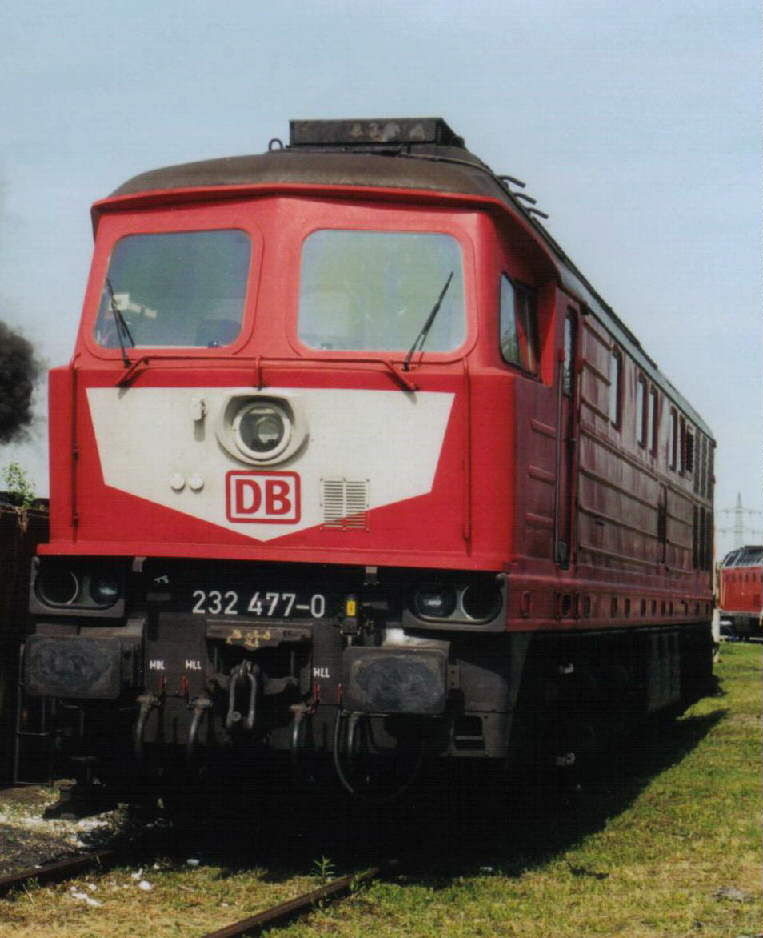
Class 232

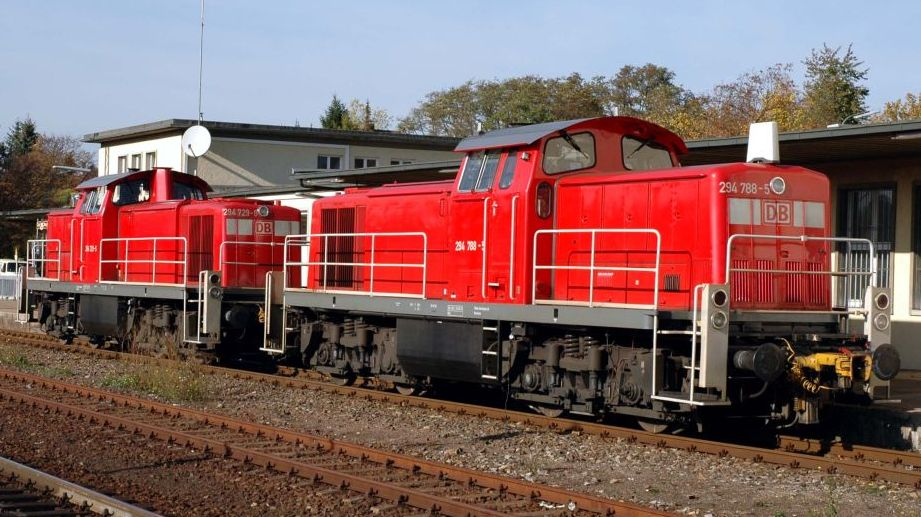
Class 294

Class	Name	Use	Remarks
(201)	ex DR V 100		Retired
(202)	ex DR V 100 ex DR 112		Retired, last No.: EB 112 646
203	ex DBAG 202	203 002 hired out: Munich S-Bahn	modernized DBAG 202
204	ex DR V 100 ex DR 114	Special services	
(211)	ex DB V 100		Retired
212	ex DB V 100.20	Construction services and on-demand trains	
(213)			Retired
(214)	ex DB 212	Tunnel assistance locomotive	Retired
215			
(216)	ex DB V 160	ICE assistance locomotive	Retired
217	ex DB V 162		
218			
(219)	ex DR 119 "U-Boot"		Retired or sold to MEG
(220)	ex DR V 200 ex DR 120 nicknamed "Taiga Drum"		Retired
225	ex DB 215	Goods services	DB 215 boiler removed
(226)		ICE assistance	Retired
(228)	ex DR V 180 ex DR 118		Retired or sold to MEG
(229)	ex DB 219		Re-engined version of BR 219, retired or to DB Netz AG
232	ex DR 132 "Ludmilla"		partly tagged for retirement, e.g. at Mukran, Dresden harbour, Halle G, Saalfeld
232.9	ex DBAG 234	Goods services	Refit variant of DBAG 234
233	ex DBAG 232		Re-engined version of DBAG 232
234	ex DBAG 232	Goods services	Modernised DBAG 232 with push-pull train equipment and V_{max} = 140 km/h
(240)	DE 1024		Retired
241	ex DBAG 232	Cross-border services to NL	Rebuilt version of DBAG 232
247	part of former ECR Euro Cargo Rail / EWS fleet	Cross-border services to FR and BE	EMD JT42CWRM, a.k.a. Class 77 in France and Class 66 in UK/NL/BE/DE/PL
260	Voith Gravita 10BB		In 2008, 130 were contracted to be built as replacements for V90
261	Vossloh G 1000 BB		Rented, not identical to reclassified V 60 engines of DB
264	MaK DE 6400		Rented from Railion NL
265	Voith Gravita 15L BB		11 built for hauling freight in the Ruhr area
266	MaK G 1206		Rented
290	ex DB V 90	Regional goods services	
291		Heavy-duty shunting	
294	ex DB 290		Rebuilt from Class 290 (radio remote control)
295	ex DB 291		Rebuilt from Class 291 (radio remote control)
296	ex DB 290		Rebuilt from Class 290 (Bergfunkfernsteuerung (mountain radio remote control) and KM-Fernsteuerung (KM remote control))
298	ex DR V100 ex DR 111		

== Hybrid- and Dual Mode locomotive ==
Class	Name	Use	Remarks
1002	Alstom Prima H3	Ranging service	Hybrid locomotive, rented from Deutsche Anlagen-Leasing
1004	CRRC Rangierlok	Ranging service	Hybrid locomotive
(1018)	Toshiba Railway HDB 800	Ranging service	Hybrid locomotive, Retired
2159	Stadler Eurodual	Goods services	Dual Mode locomotive, rented from European Loc Pool
2248	Siemens Vectron Dual Mode	ICE-Auxiliary locomotive, Talgo	Dual Mode locomotive
2249	Siemens Vectron Dual Mode Light	Goods services	Dual Mode locomotive

== Minor locomotives ==
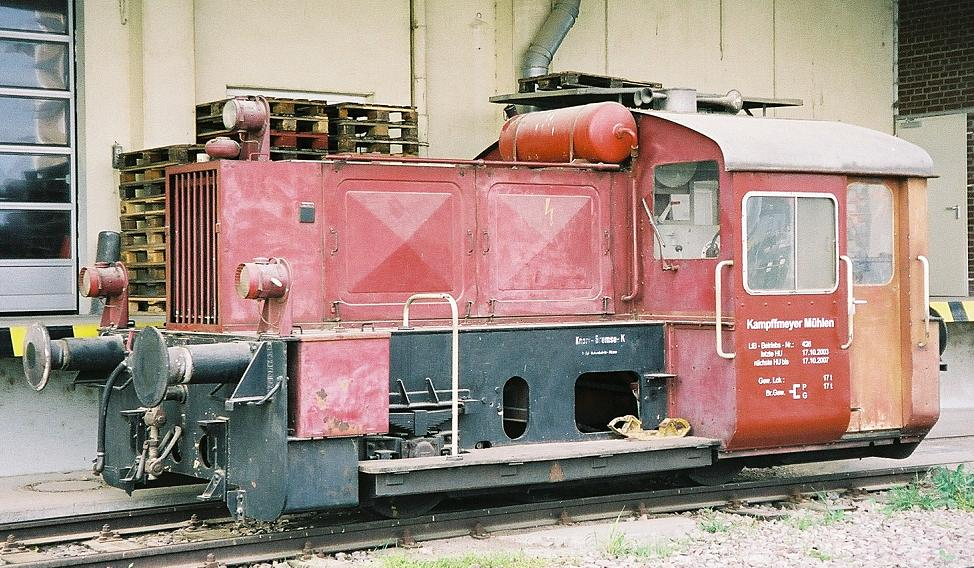
Köf II, here in Kampffmeyer Mühlen livery at Mannheim

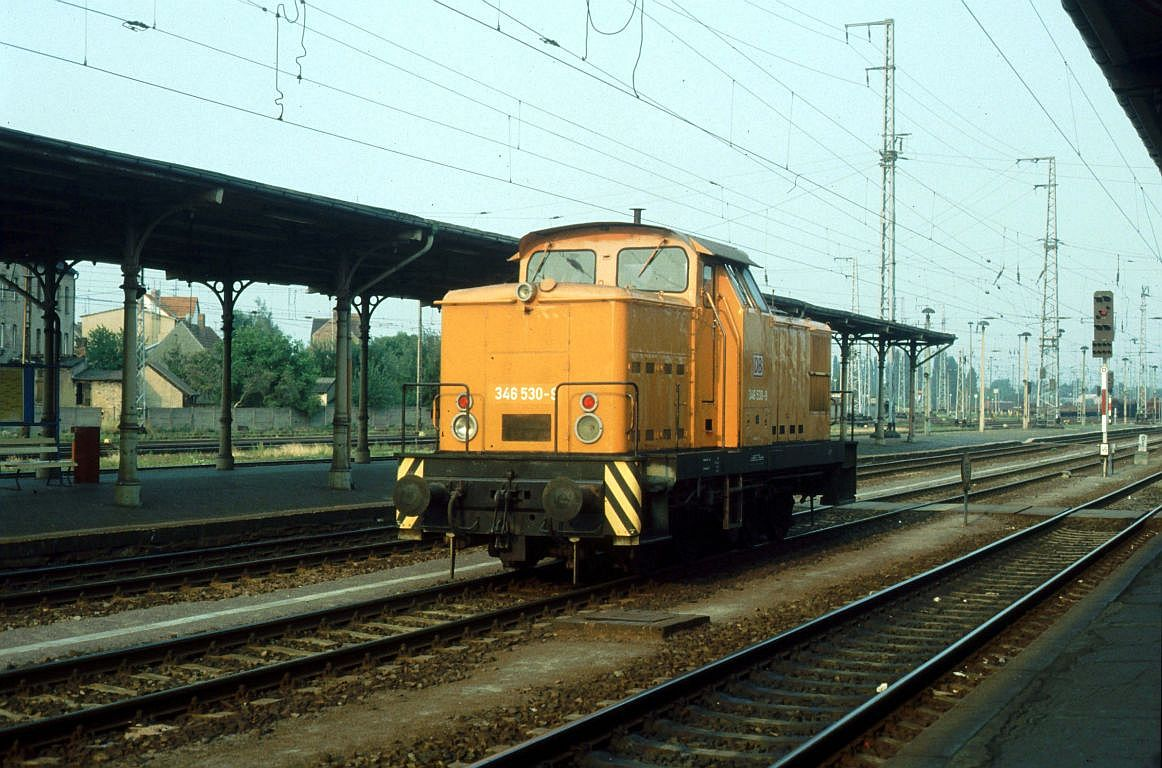
DB class 345/346

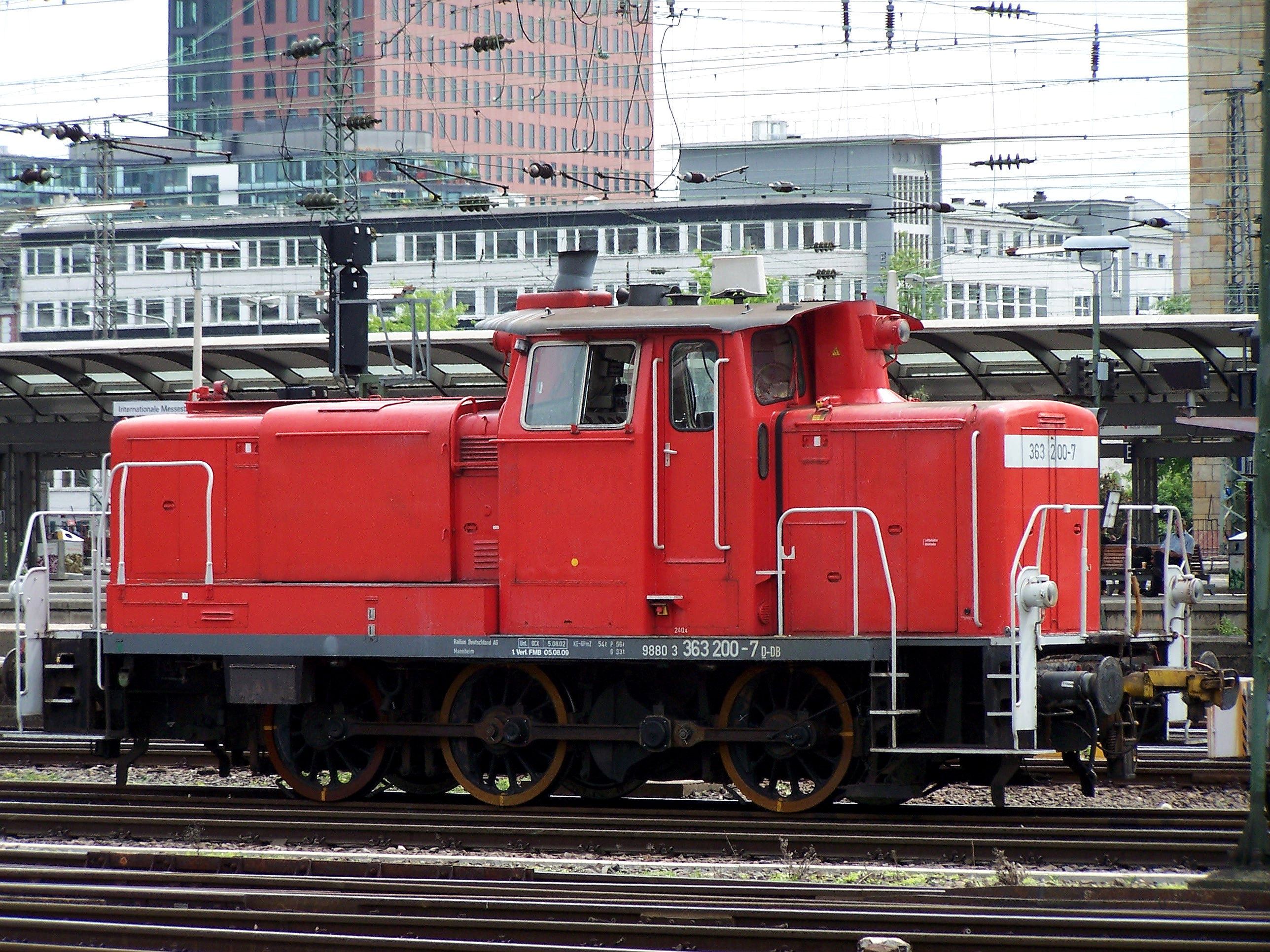
DB class 363

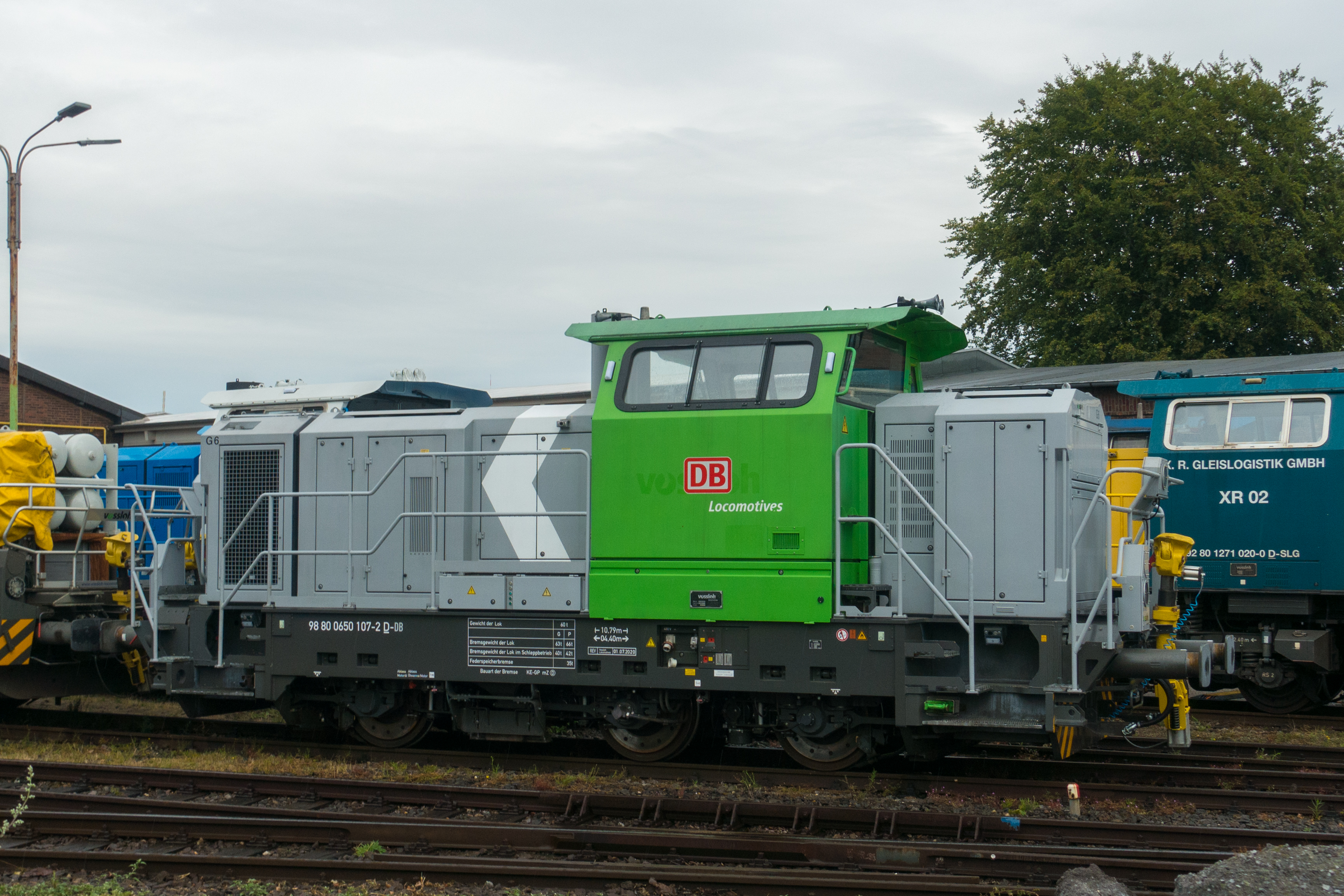
G 6

Class	Name	Use	Remarks
310	ex DR 100, Kö II		
311	ex DR V 15 ex DR 101		
312	ex DR 102		
323	Köf II		
324	Köf II		
332	Köf III		
333	Köf III		
335	Köf III		
(344)	ex DBAG 346		Rebuilt version of DBAG 346 with optimal fuel consumption engine, Retired
(345/346)	ex DR V 60 ex DR 106		Retired
347	ex DR V 60 ex DR 106	Refit for wide gauge 1524 mm, used at Mukran ferry terminal	
351		Railion Deutschland at Braunschweig shunting station	Rented from Verkehrsbetriebe Peine-Salzgitter GmbH
352	Vossloh G 400 B	DB Long-distance services	Rented from Vossloh Locomotives, Kiel
360	ex DB V 60 ex DB 260		"Leichte Version (light version)"
361	ex DB V 60 ex DB 260		"Schwere Version (heavy version)"
362	ex DBAG 364		Rebuilt from DBAG 364 (new engine)
363	ex DBAG 365		Rebuilt from DBAG 365 (new engine)
364	ex DBAG 360		Rebuilt from DBAG 360 (radio remote control)
365	ex DBAG 361 ex DBAG 364		Rebuild from DBAG 361 (radio remote control) reclassified DBAG 364
383	ex DR ASF		
399 101–104		Wangerooge Island Railway	Sold
399 105–106	L 18 H type	Wangerooge Island Railway	
399 107–108		Wangerooge Island Railway	Newly built by Schöma
(399 110–111)	Re-gauged Kö II from Industriebahn Halle		Retired
G 6	Vossloh G 6	Regional shunting services	

== Electric multiple units ==
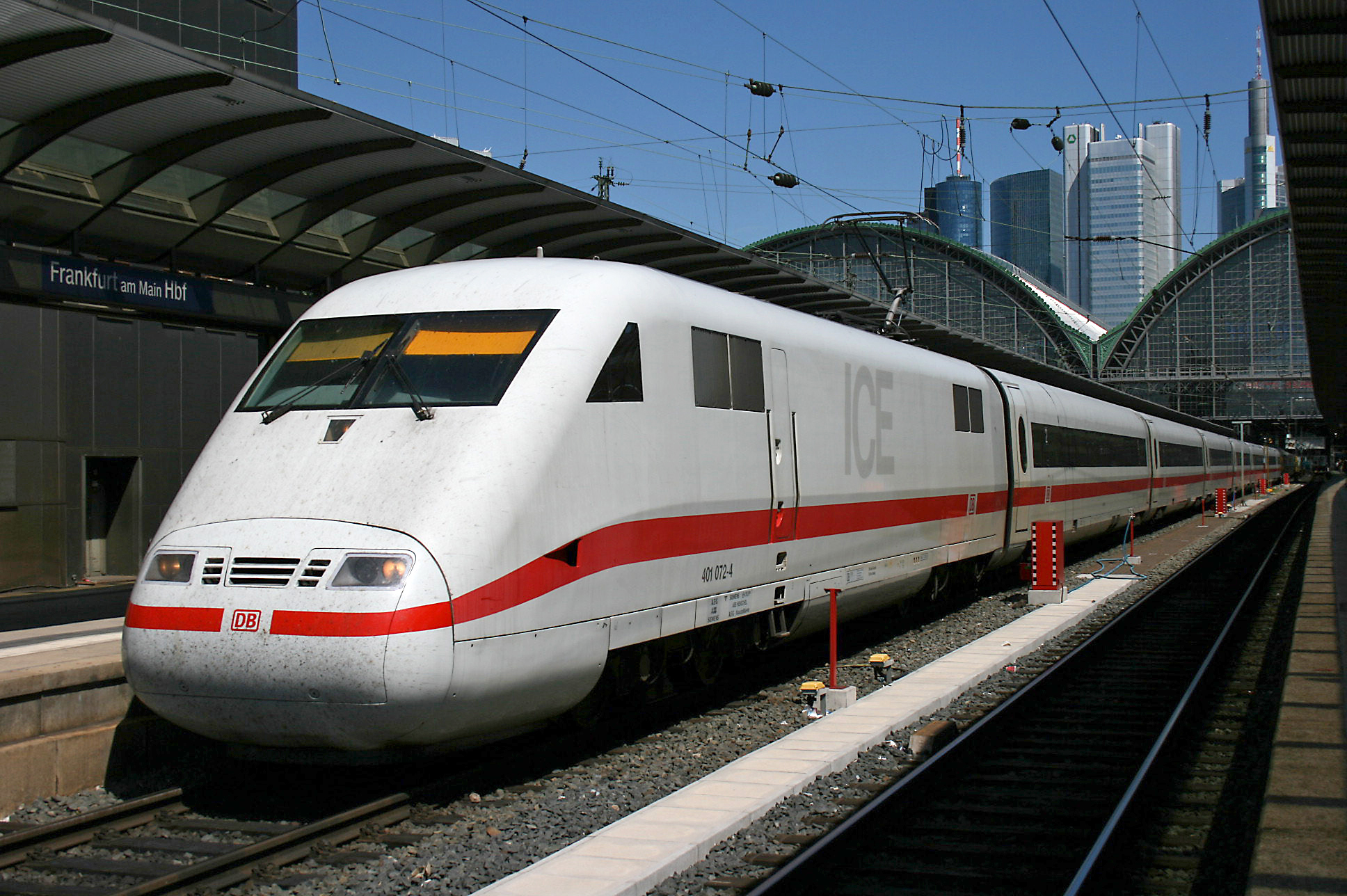
DB Class 401

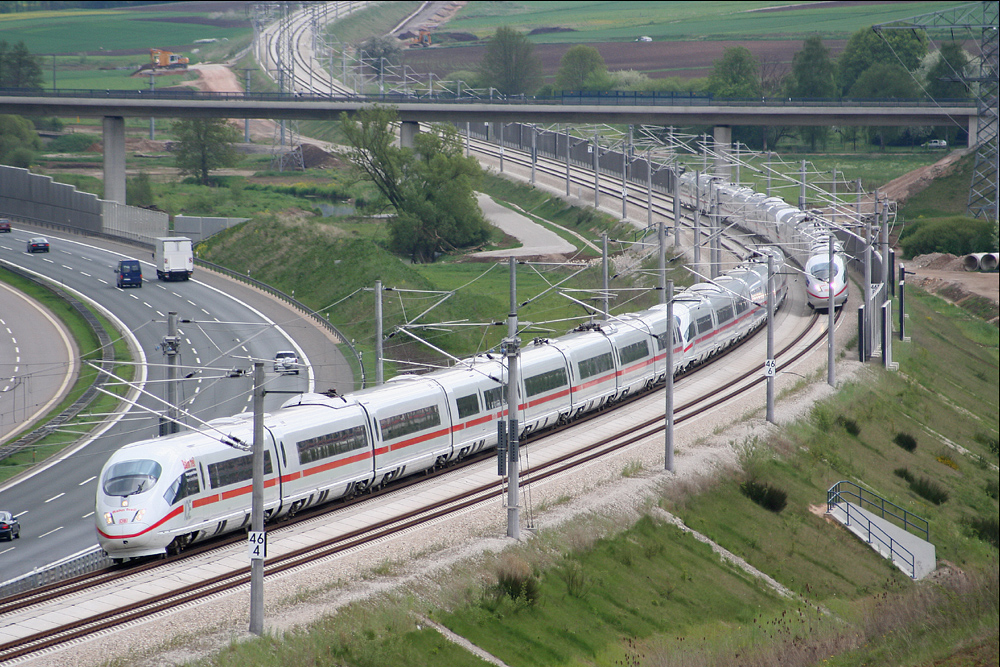
DB Class 403

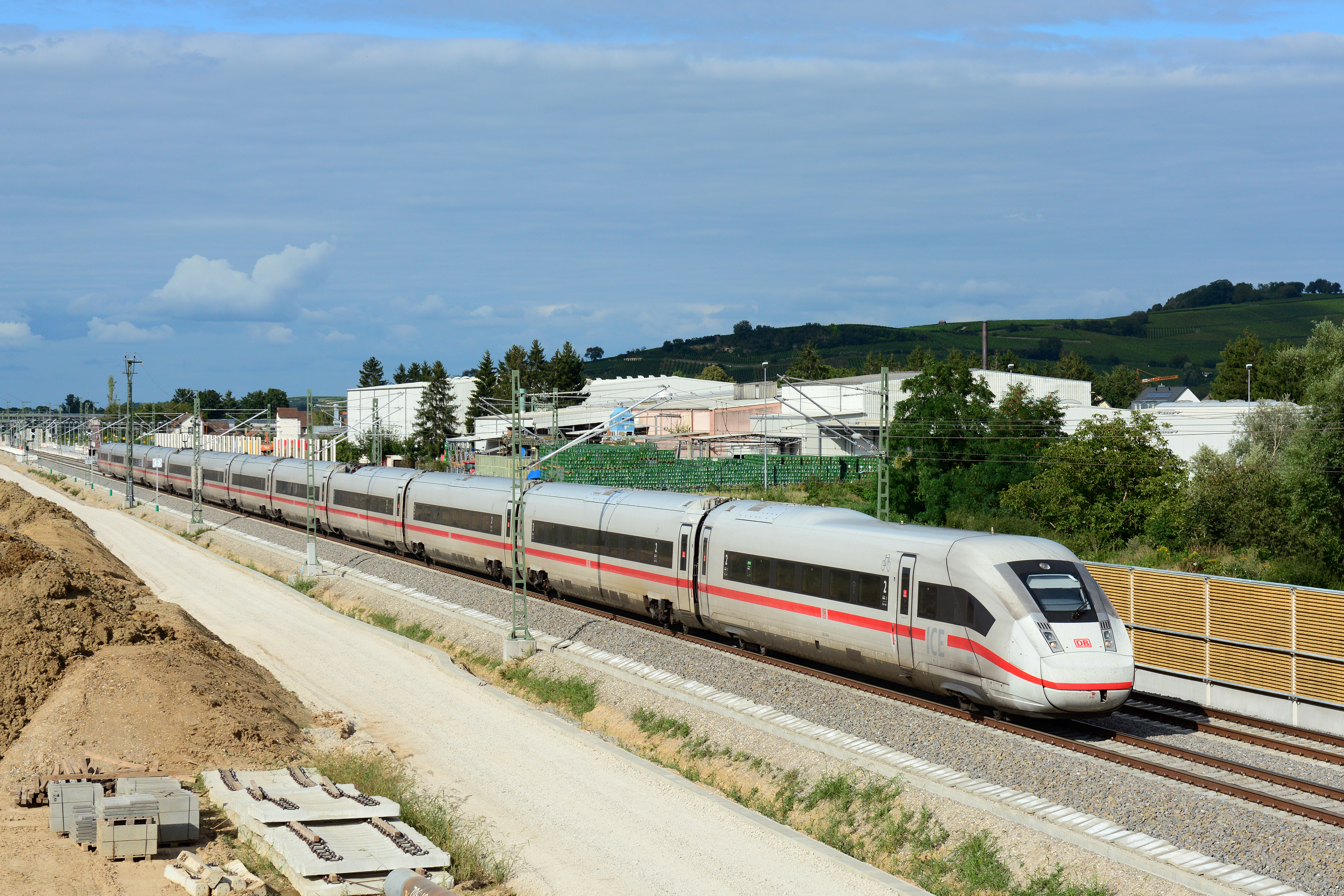
DB Class 412

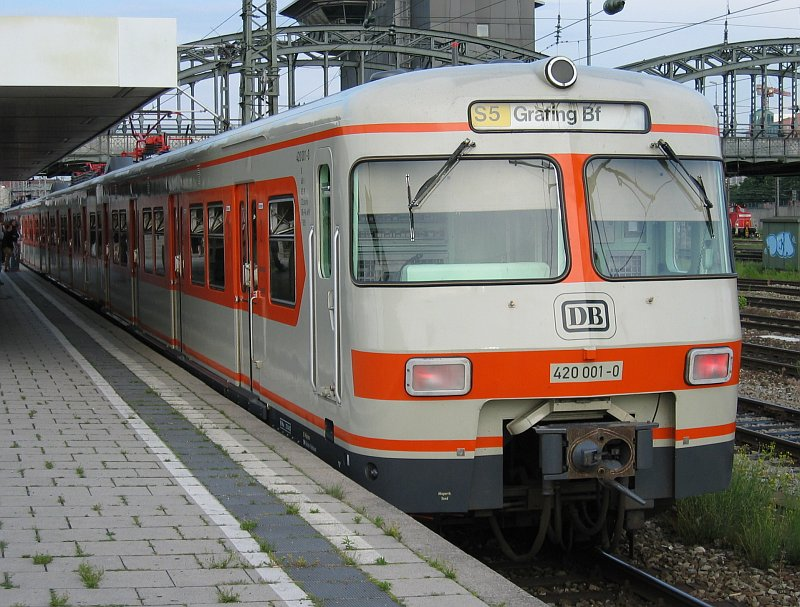
DB Class 420

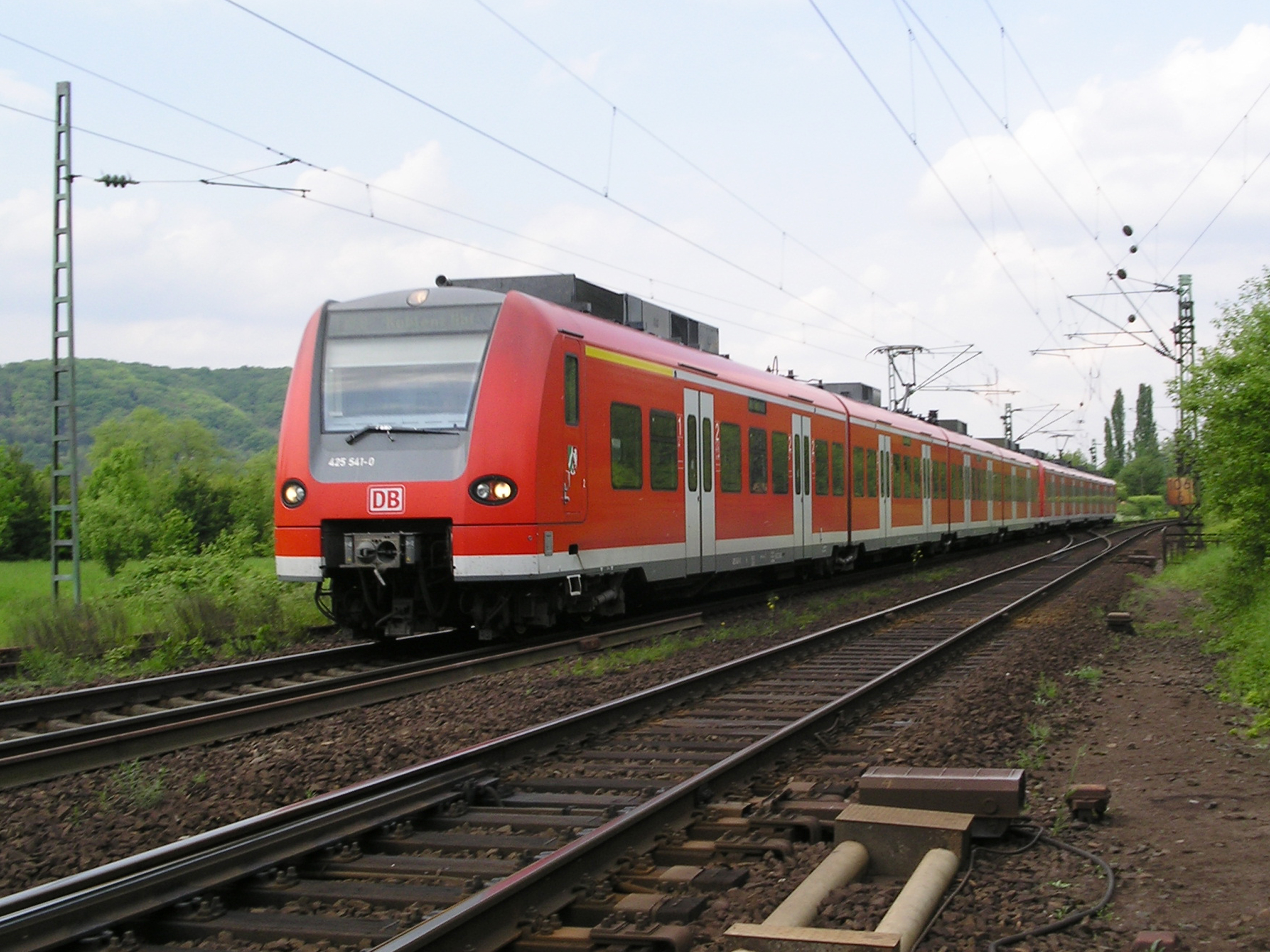
DB Class 425

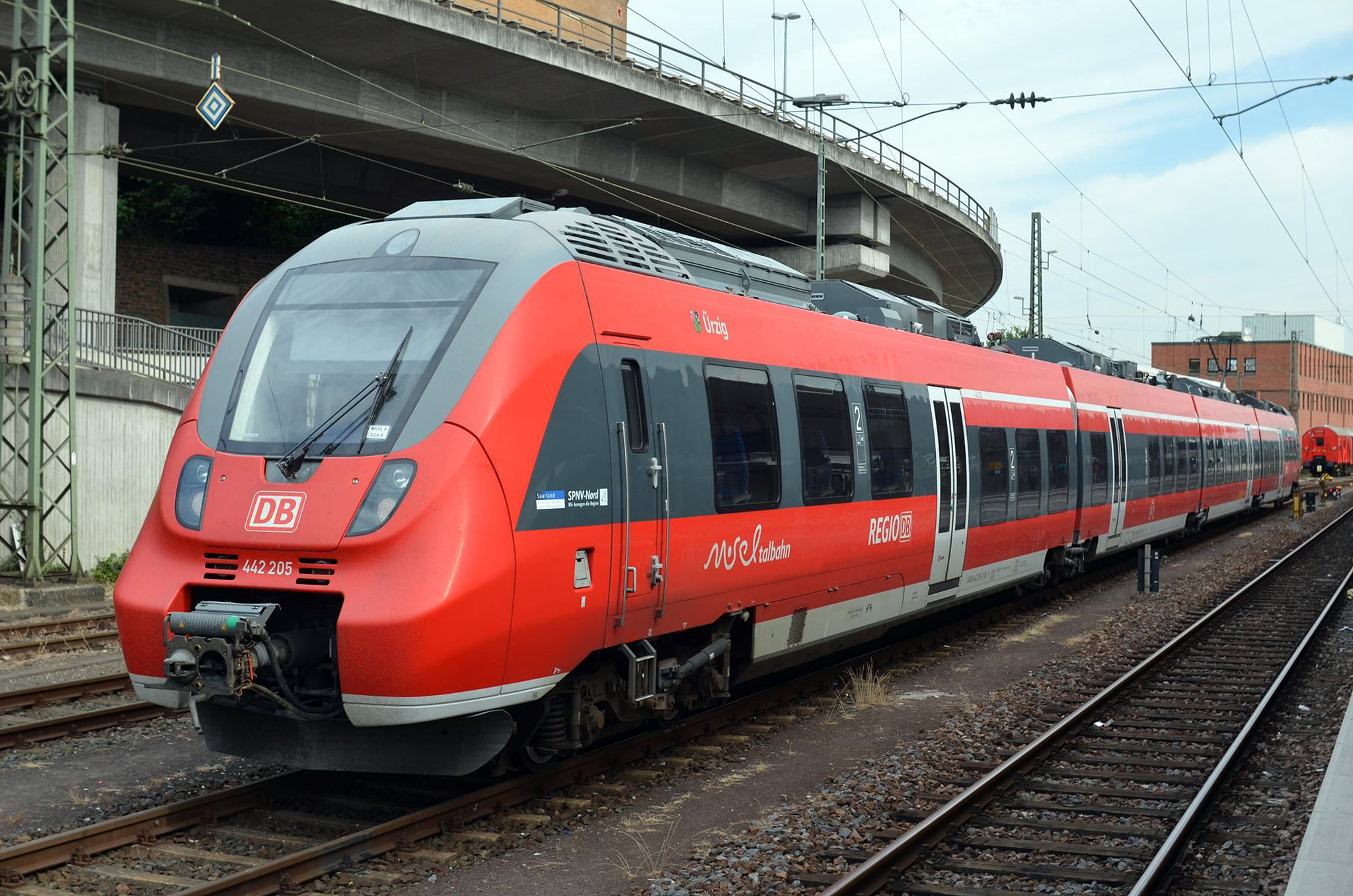
DB Class 442

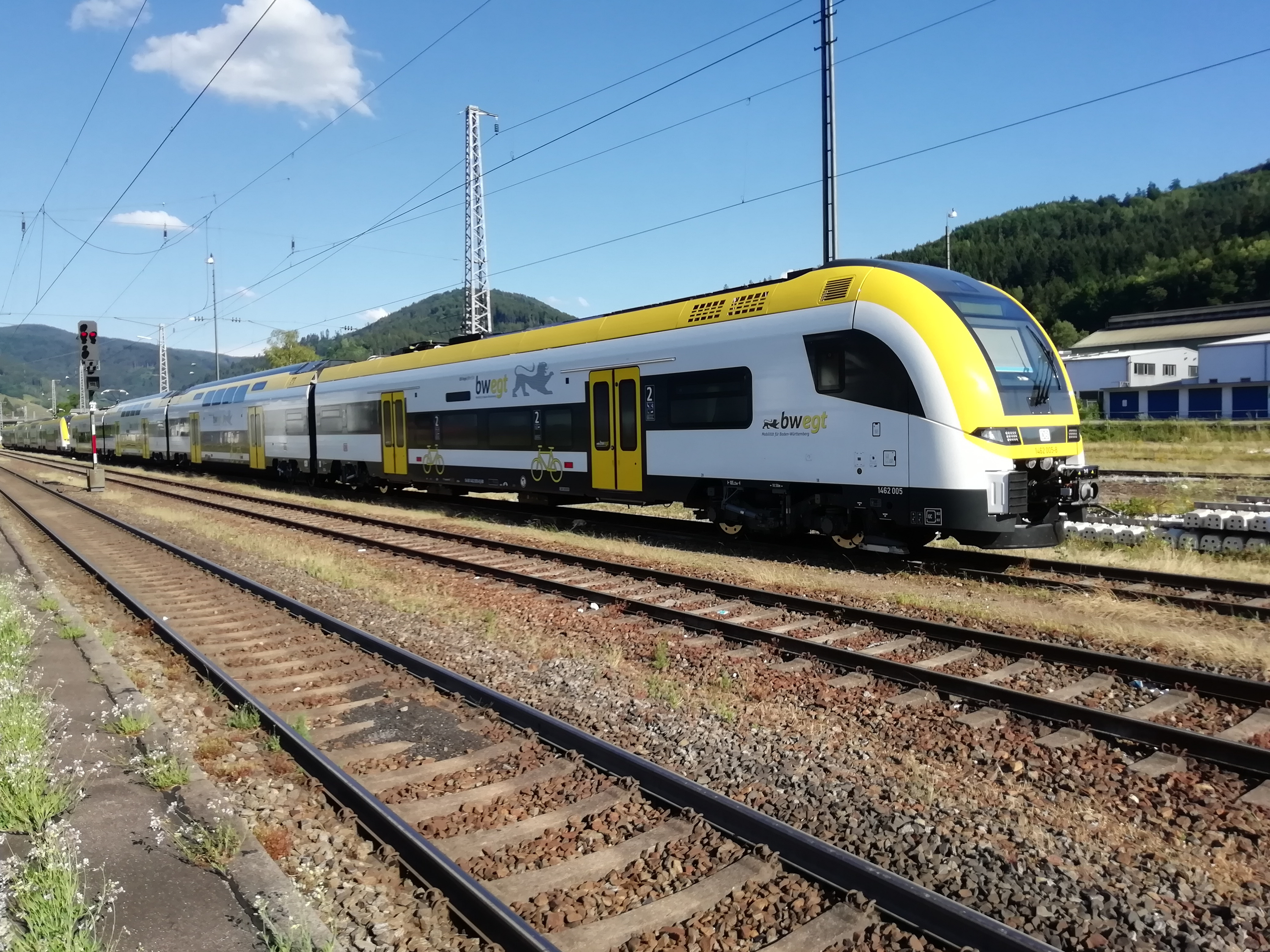
DB Class 462

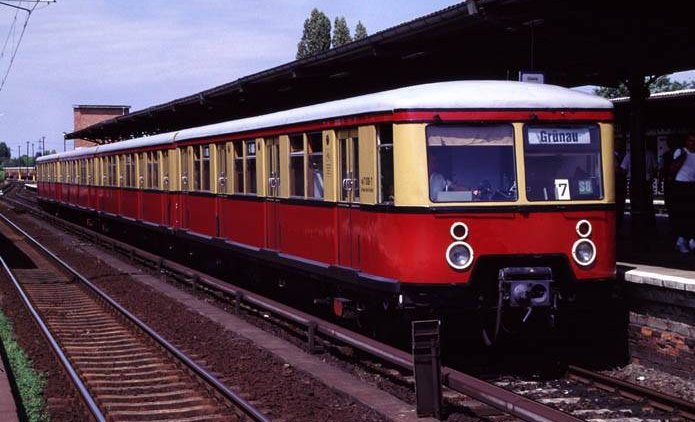
DRG Class ET 167, also known as DB Class 477

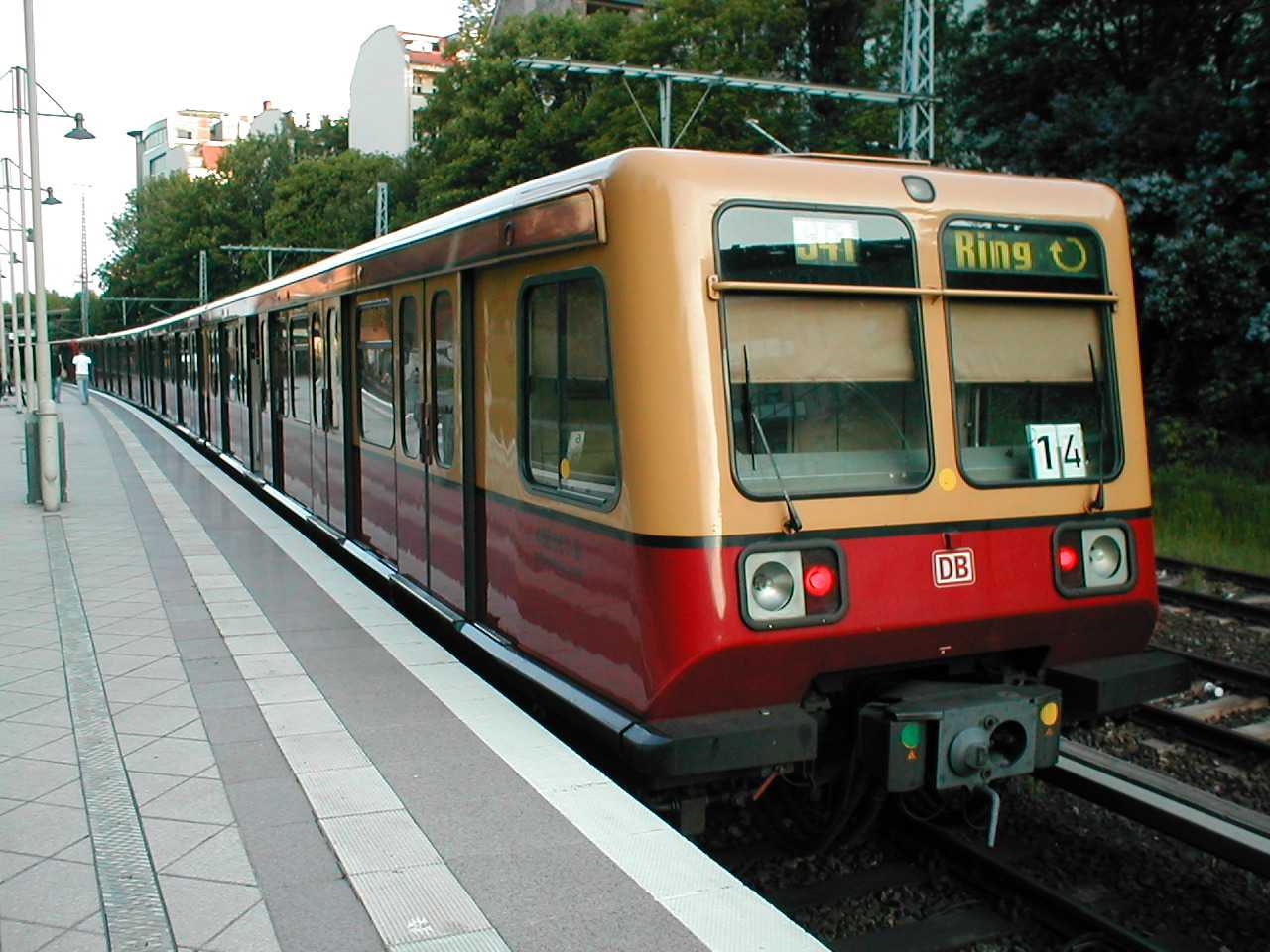
DB Class 485

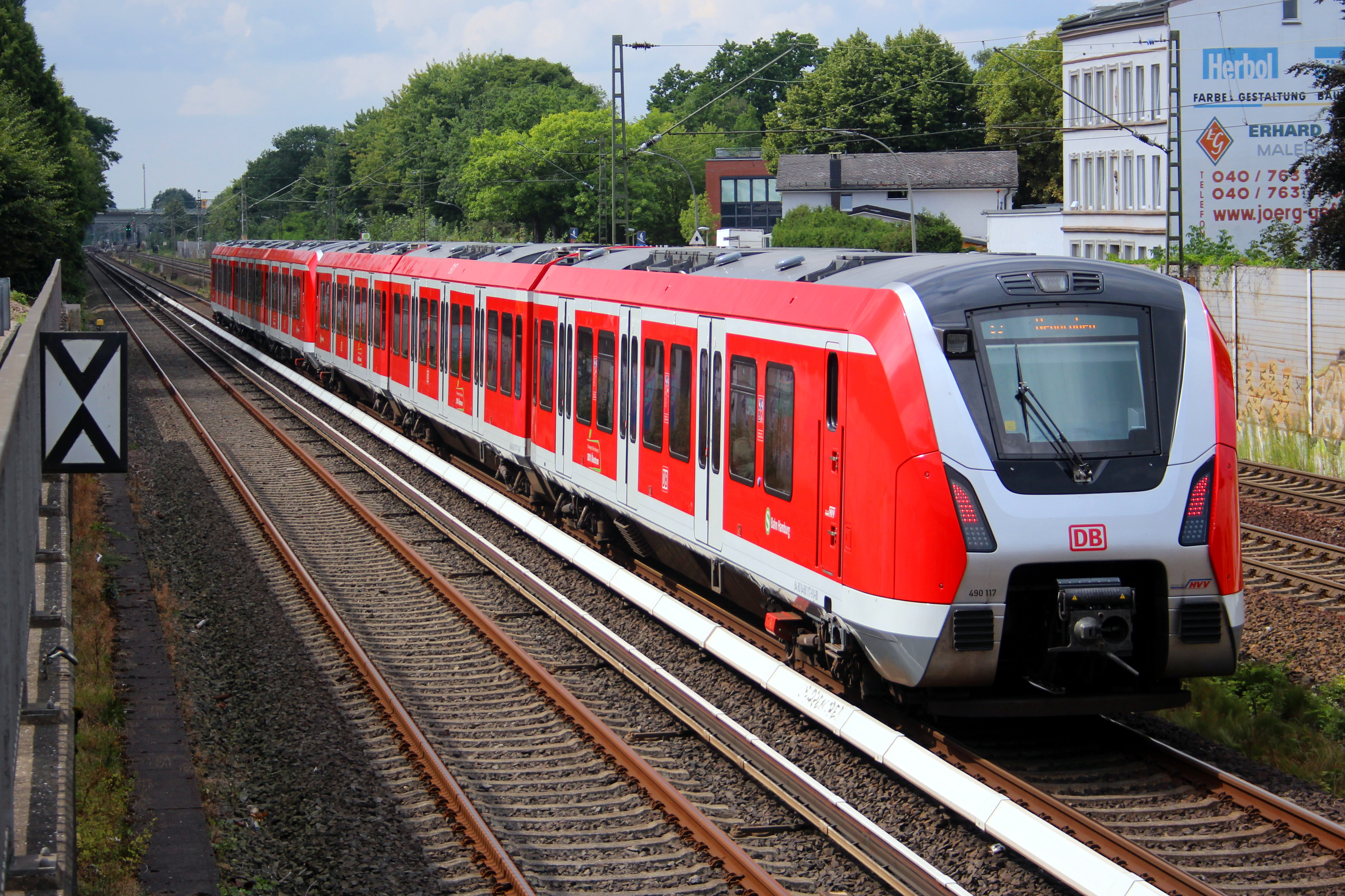
DB Class 490

Class	Name	Use	Remarks
401	ICE 1	High-speed services	
402	ICE 2	High-speed services	
403	ICE 3	High-speed services	
406	ICE 3M	International high-speed services	Multi-voltage system
407	ICE 3 (MS)/Velaro D	International high-speed services	Multi-voltage system
408	ICE 3neo/Velaro MS	International high-speed services	Multi-voltage system
409	Thalys	International high-speed services	
410	ICE V and ICE S	Measuring and test units	No passenger service
411	ICE T	High-speed services	Tilting train, seven units per train
4110	Stadler KISS	Long-distance services	Previously operated by Westbahn
412	ICE 4	High-speed services	
415	ICE T	High-speed services	Tilting train, five units per train
420; Central unit: 421		S-Bahn services: Munich, formerly Frankfurt, Stuttgart, Rhine-Ruhr, Köln	
422; Central unit: 432		S-bahn Services: Rhine-Ruhr	
423; Central unit: 433		S-Bahn Services: Rhine-Main, Munich, Stuttgart, Rhine-Ruhr	
424; Central unit: 434		S-Bahn Services: Munich, Köln, formerly Hannover	
425; Central unit: 435		S-Bahn Services: Rhine-Neckar, Mittelelbe, Rhine-Main, Regional services, formerly Nuremberg	
426		Regional services	Short train
1428	Stadler FLIRT	Regional services	Four units per train
429/429.1	Stadler FLIRT	Regional services	Five units per train
430		S-Bahn Services: Rhine-Main, Stuttgart	
440	Alstom Coradia LIREX Continental	Regional services	
1440	Alstom Coradia	S-Bahn services: Nuremberg, Breisgau, Rhein-Ruhr, Regional services	second generation
442; Central unit: 443; 1442; Central unit: 1443; 2442; Central unit: 2443; 3442; Central unit: 3443	Bombardier TALENT 2	S-Bahn Services: Nuremberg, Mitteldeutschland, Rostock, Regional services	
445/446	Bombardier TWINDEXX	Regional services	
445	Meridian	Test unit	Model unit, out of service
445	Stadler KISS	Regional services	
450	GT8-100C/2S	Stadtbahn Karlsruhe	Retired
462	Siemens Desiro HC	Regional services	
463	Siemens Mireo	S-Bahn Services: Rhine-Neckar, S-Bahn Mitteldeutschland, Regional services	
470		S-Bahn Hamburg	Retired
471		S-Bahn Hamburg	Retired
472; Central unit: 473		S-Bahn Hamburg	1200 V =, contact rail
474		S-Bahn Hamburg	Retired, 1200 V =, contact rail
475		S-Bahn Berlin	Retired
476		S-Bahn Berlin	Retired
477		S-Bahn Berlin	Retired
478		Work and service units of S-Bahn Berlin	Collective class
479.2		Oberweißbacher Bergbahn	
479.6		Buckower Kleinbahn	Sold
480		S-Bahn Berlin	750 V =, contact rail
481; Control car: 482		S-Bahn Berlin	750 V =, contact rail
483/484		S-Bahn Berlin	750 V =, contact rail
485		S-Bahn Berlin	Retired, 750 V =, contact rail
488	"Panorama S-Bahn"	S-Bahn Berlin	750 V =, contact rail
490		S-Bahn Hamburg	15 kV, 16,7 Hz~; 1200 V = (Stromschiene)
491	"Glass Train"	Recreational trips	Retired, accident

== Battery electric multiple unit ==
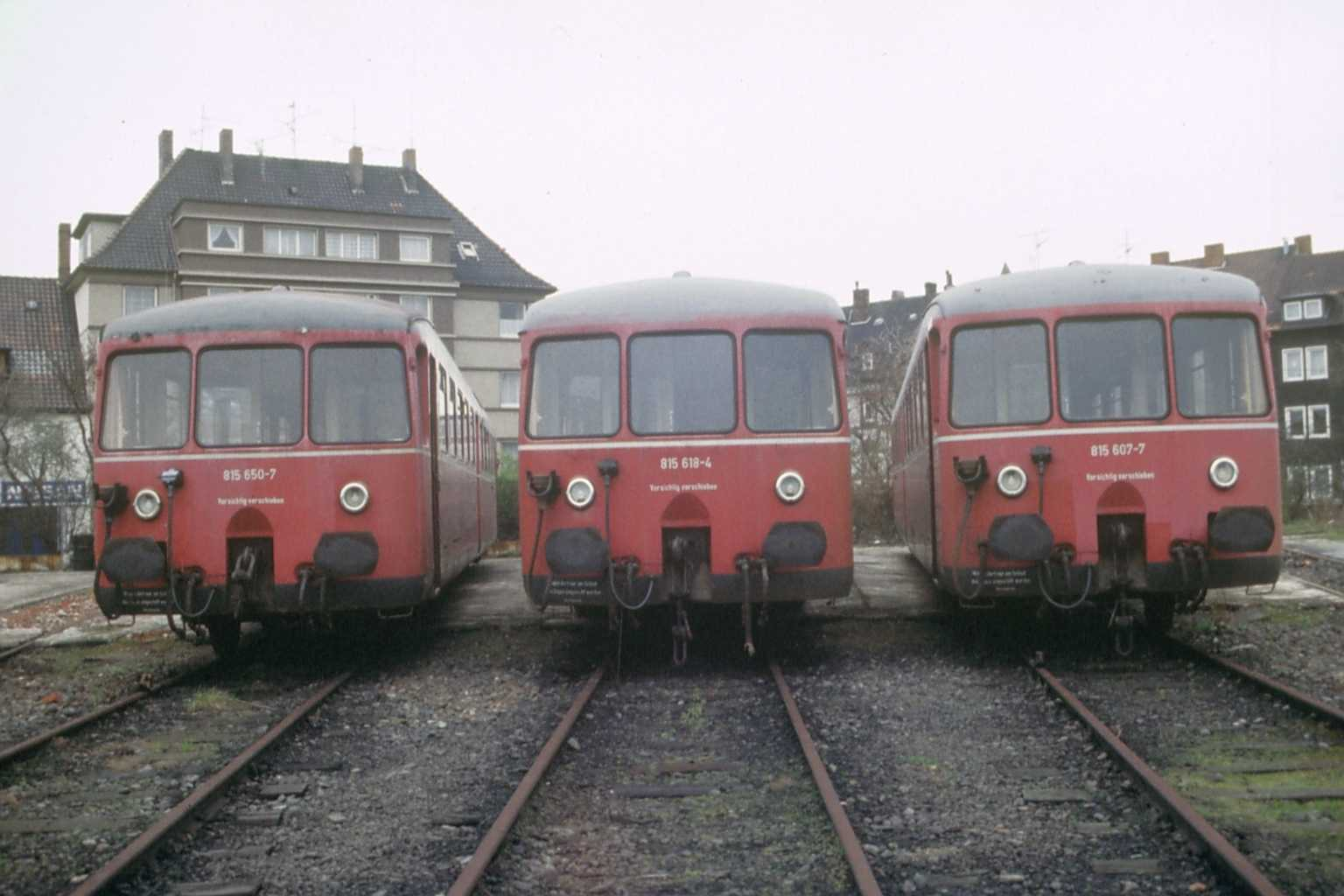
Class 515

Class	Name	Use	Remarks
515		Regional services	Retired 1995
526	Stadler FLIRT Akku	Regional services	
557	CAF Civity BEMU	Regional services	
563	Siemens Mireo Plus B	S-bahn service: Mitteldeutschland	

== Hydrogen train ==
Class	Name	Use	Remarks
554	Alstom Coradia iLint	Regional services	Start GmbH
563	Siemens Mireo Plus H	Regional services	Trial operation

== Diesel multiple units ==
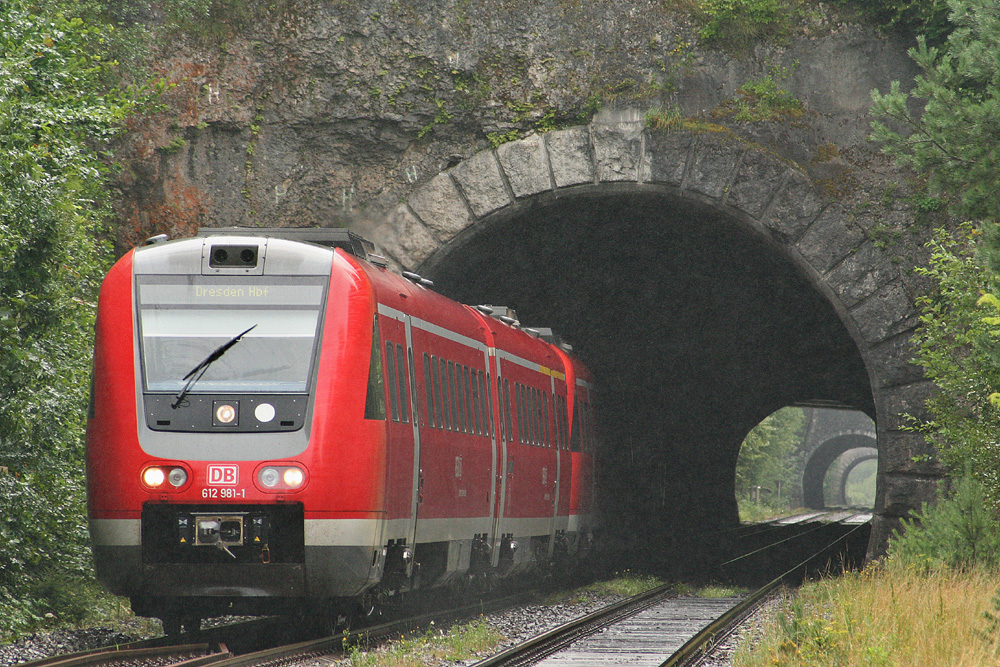
Class 612

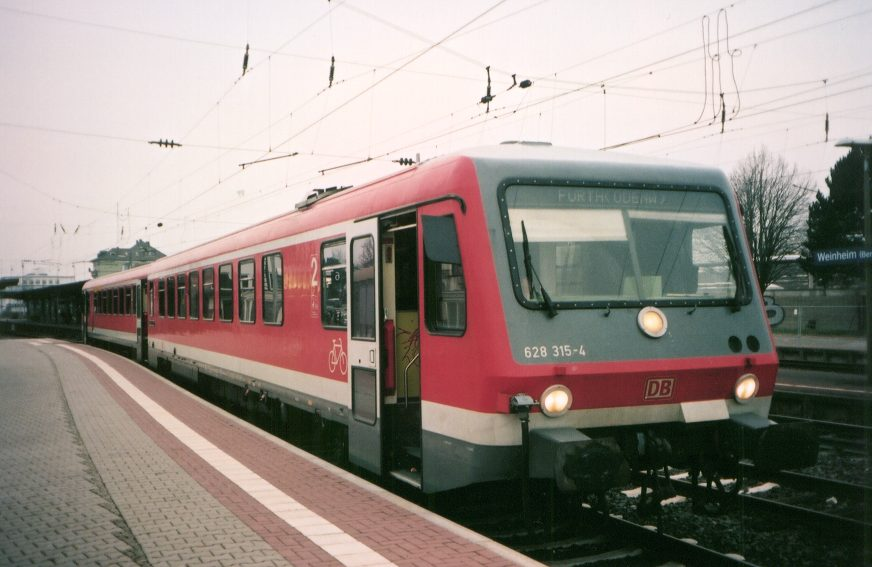
Class 628

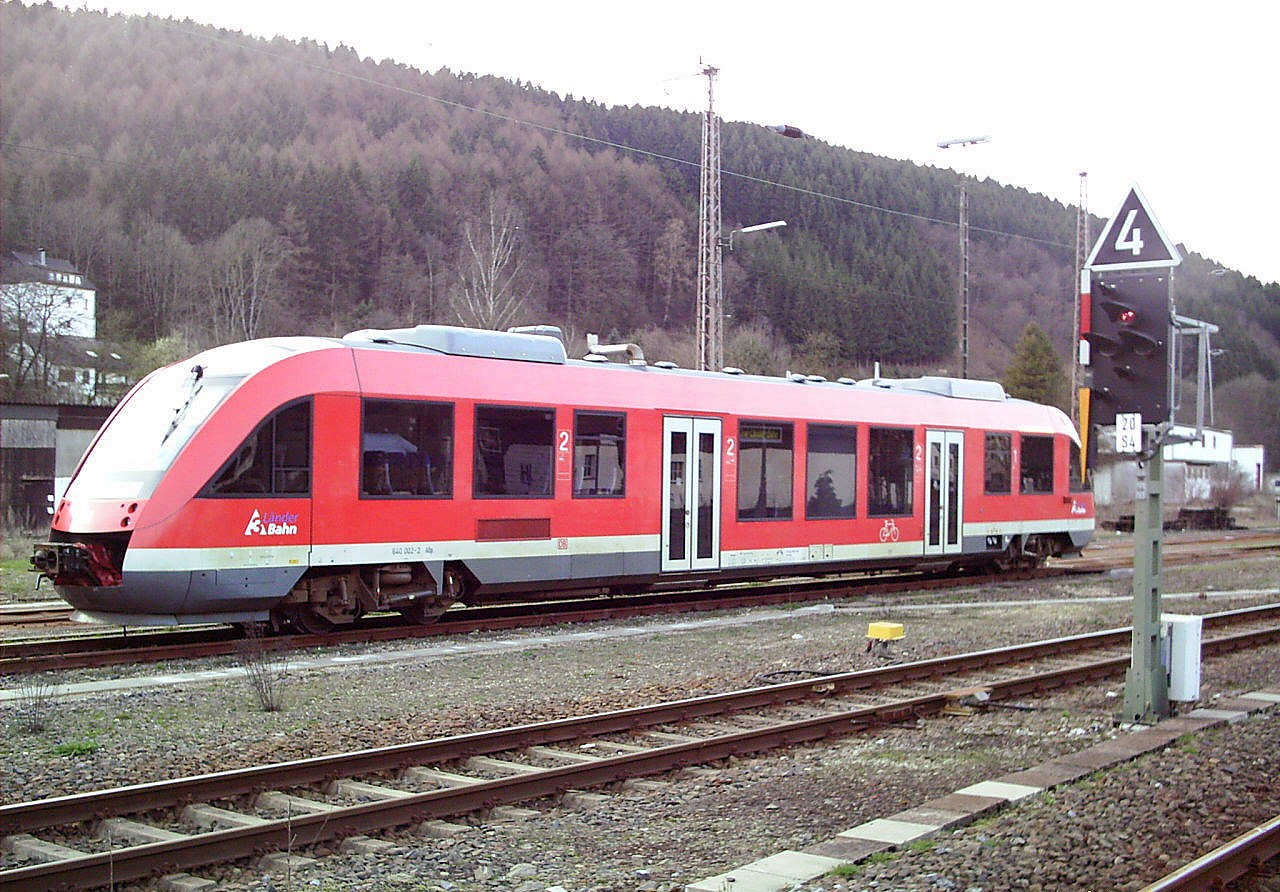
Class 640

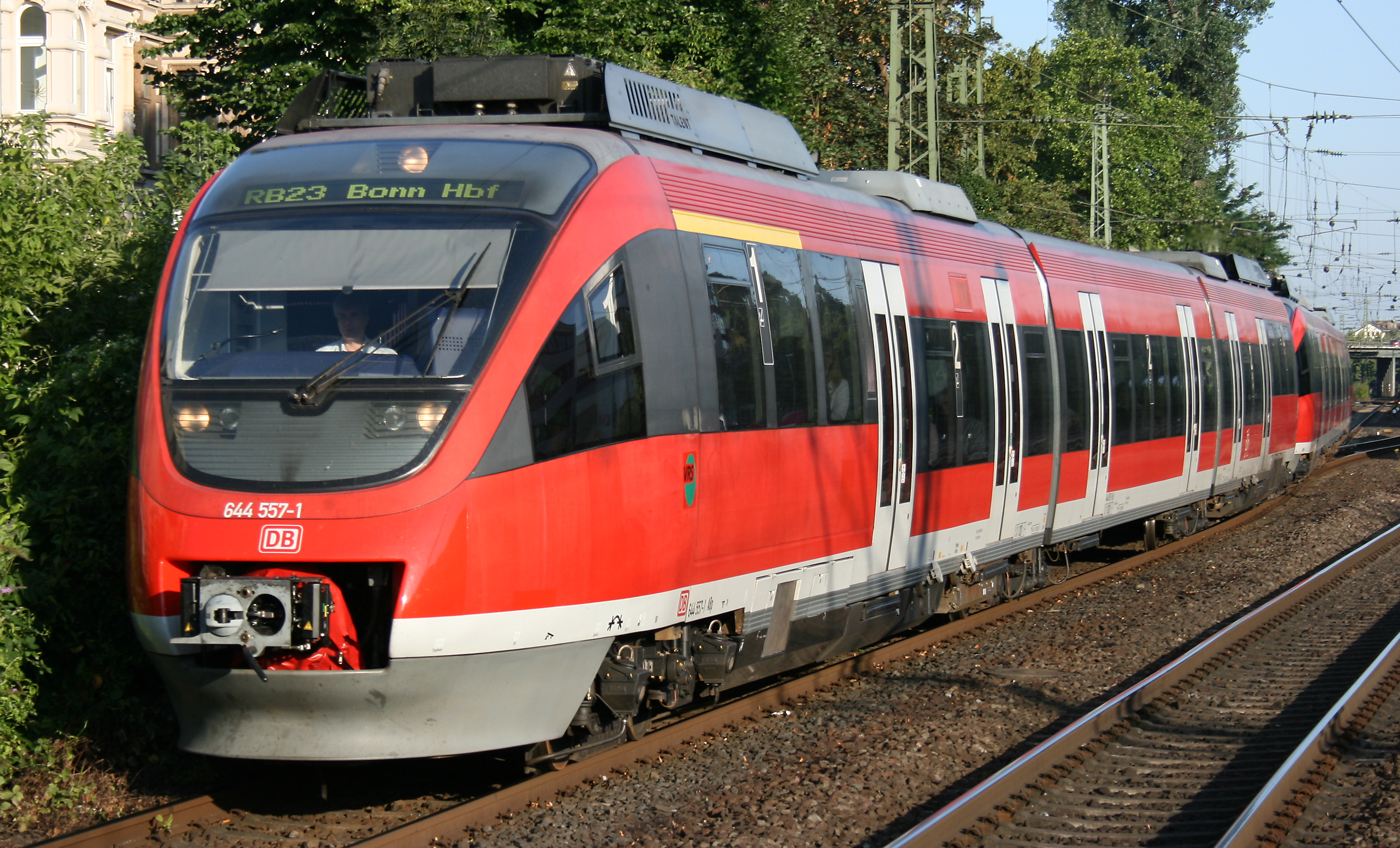
Class 644

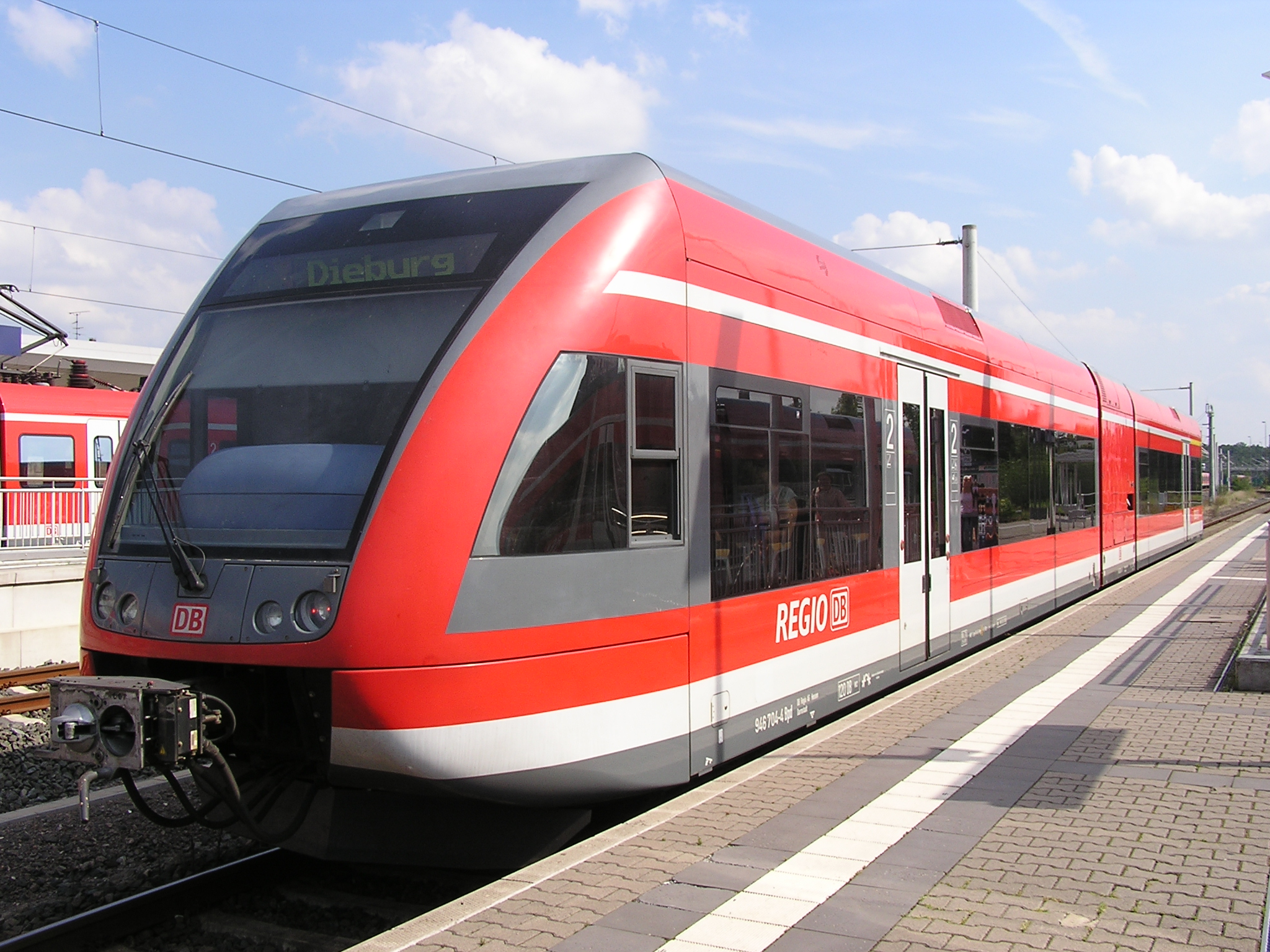
Class 646 in Rödermark-Ober Roden

Class	Name	Use	Remarks
605	ICE TD	Long-distance services	Retired
610		Regional services	Retired, Tilting technology
611		Regional services	Retired, Tilting technology
612	Regio-Swinger	Regional services	Tilting technology
614		Regional services	Retired
618	LIREX	Trials	Retired, Prototype
620	LINT 54	Regional services	
622	LINT 81	Regional services	
623	LINT 41	Regional services	new head shape
624		Regional services	Retired, rented to PKP
626/926	NE 81	WestFrankenBahn	Retired, Rented from Kahlgrund Verkehrs-GmbH
627		Regional services	Retired
628.0		Regional services	Retired, some in service with the PKP
628/629		Regional services	
631	Pesa Link I	Regional services	Retired, One unit per train
632	Pesa Link II	Regional services	Two units per train
633	Pesa Link III	Regional services	Three units per train
634		Regional services	Retired, Mothballed
640	LINT 27	Regional services (NRW)	
641		Regional services, S-Bahn Services: Mitteldeutschland	
642	Siemens Desiro	Regional services, S-Bahn Services: Dresden	
643	Talent	Regional services	Diesel-mechanical
644	Talent	Regional services	Diesel-electric
646	GTW 2/6	Regional services	
648	LINT 41	Regional services	
650	Regio-Shuttle RS1	Regional services (BW, RLP)	
(670)	Doppelstock-Schienenbus	Regional services	Retired, Sold to DWE, PEG and FBE
672	LVT/S	Burgenlandbahn	
(690)	CargoSprinter	Goods services (Container transport)	Retired
(691)	CargoSprinter	Goods services (Container transport)	Retired
(771)	ex DR VT 2.09 ex DR 171	Regional services	Retired
(772)	ex DR 172	Regional services	Retired, 2 vehicles with the Oberweißbacher Bergbahn and Schwarzatalbahn

== Railway works vehicles ==
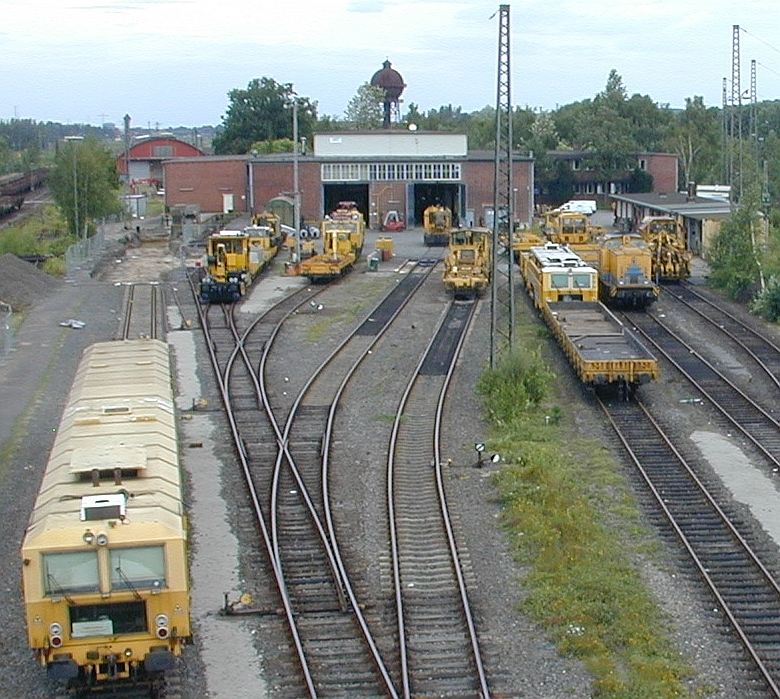
Work trains in Duisburg

Class	Name	Use	Remarks
701		Catenaries work unit	
702		Catenaries work unit	
703	IFO	Catenaries service car	
704		Catenaries work unit	
705	TIF	Tunnel service unit	
706	OMF	Catenaries construction car	
707	TTF	"Technology car"	
708		Catenaries work unit	
709		Catenaries work unit	
711.0	HIOB	Hoisting platform, catenaries service car	
711.1		Catenaries service car	
712	PROM	Track profile recording unit	
713	LIMEZ	Structure gauge measurement	Retired
714		Engine for rescue trains	
715		Engine for track grinding trains	Owned by Speno
716		Rotary snow plough	
719		Track testing unit	
723		Radar car	Retired
724		PZB measuring car	
725/726		Track measurement	
727		LZB measuring car	
728		PZB measuring car	
732		Hamburg S-Bahn de-icing car	Retired
740		Signalling car	
750		Employed on test runs	ex DB 103, DB E 03
751		Employed on test runs	ex DB 110, DB E 10
752		Employed on test runs	ex DB 120.0
753		Employed on test runs	ex DB 217, DB V 162
754.1		Employed on test runs	ex DB 230.1, DR 130.1
756		Employed for shunting	ex DB 312, DR 102
760		Employed for shunting	Powered by natural gas, ex DB 360 877; Retired

== See also ==
- Deutsche Bahn
- UIC identification marking for tractive stock
