= DB Class 724 =

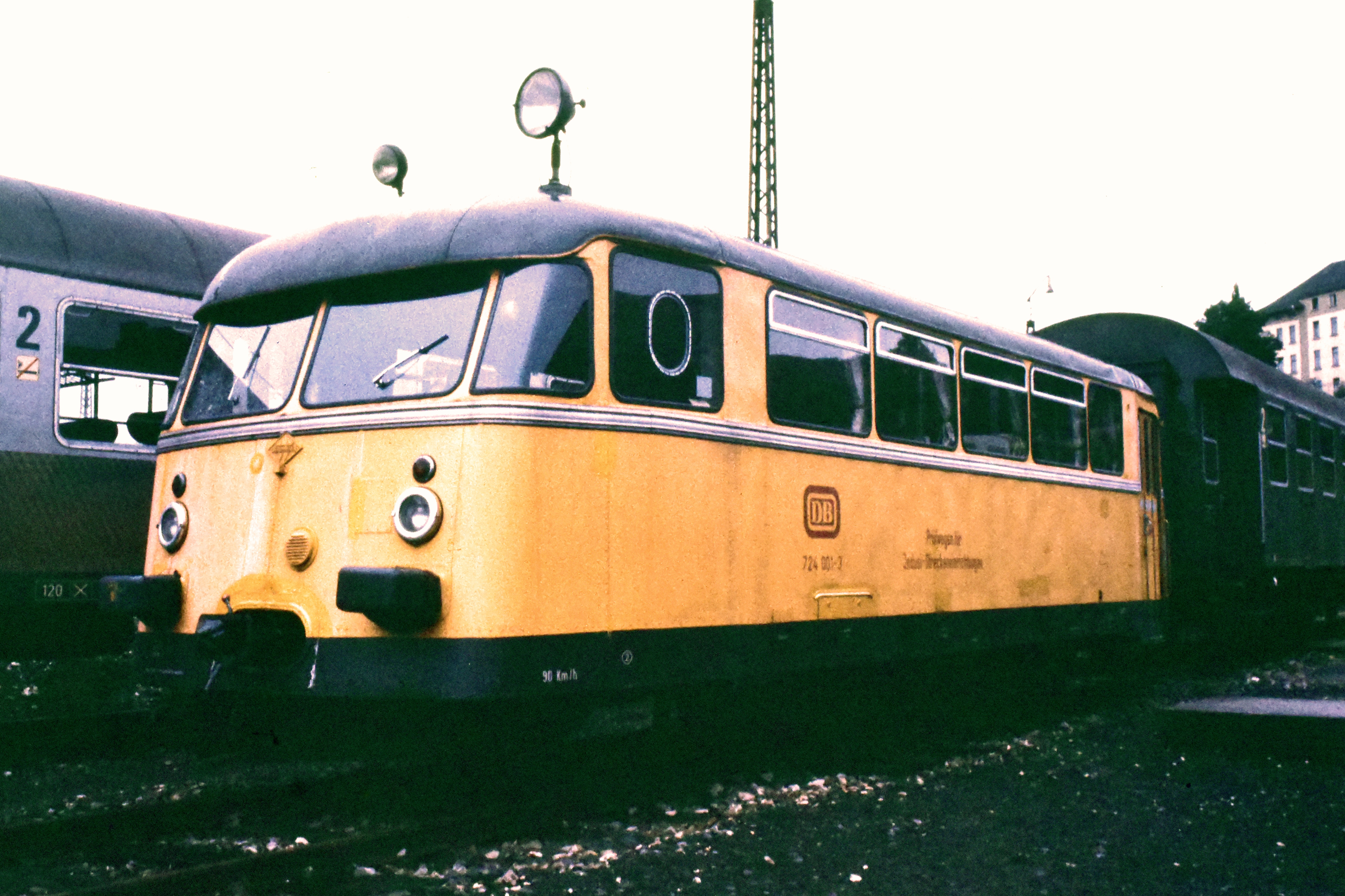
724 001 in Ulm in August 1983

The Class 724 operated by the German national railway, Deutsche Bundesbahn, was a railway department vehicle used for testing Indusi installations. Only three examples of this class existed.

== 724 001 ==
After its retirement on 21 June 1963, having clocked up 1,236,000 kilometres, the Uerdingen railbus VT 95 906, one of the original prototypes of its class, was converted in the repair shop (Ausbesserungswerk or Aw) at Kassel into a test vehicle for Indusi railway installations. Designated as 6205 Wt it began its new duties on 25 February 1964 at Bahnbetriebswerk (Bw) Wuppertal and replaced the measurement draisine previously used for this task. On 1 January 1968 it was given the number 724 001–3. The installation of testing magnets on both sides of the vehicle in 1971 considerably improved its utility, making it possible to test station entry and exit signals in one pass. Number 724 001 was retired on 18 January 1986 at Bw Heidelberg. Since then the vehicle was left by itself for many years and eventually stood in a very dilapidated state in front of Worms locomotive shed. In 2007 the railbus was bought up by the Vulkaneifelbahn and taken away to Gerolstein, where the intention is to restore it in the medium-term.

No. 724 001 is the last existing Uerdingen railbus prototype, the former Class VT 95.

- Vehicle number: 724 001-3 ex 6205 Wt; VT 95 906
- Class: 724
- Manufacturer: Uerdingen 1950 / 56752
- Conversion: 1968 AW Kassel
- Length over buffers: 10,650 mm
- Empty weight: 15 t
- Top speed: 90 km/h
- Power: 110 kW

== 724 002 and 724 003 ==
Because more and more lines were equipped with Indusi, one vehicle no longer proved sufficient. So in 1972 the retired railbuses, VT 795 144 and 471, were also converted to test vehicles, again at Aw Kassel, and numbered as 724 002-1 and 724 003–9.

== See also ==
- List of DB locomotives and railbuses
- Uerdingen railbus
