= DBAG Class 490 =

DBAG Baureihe 490
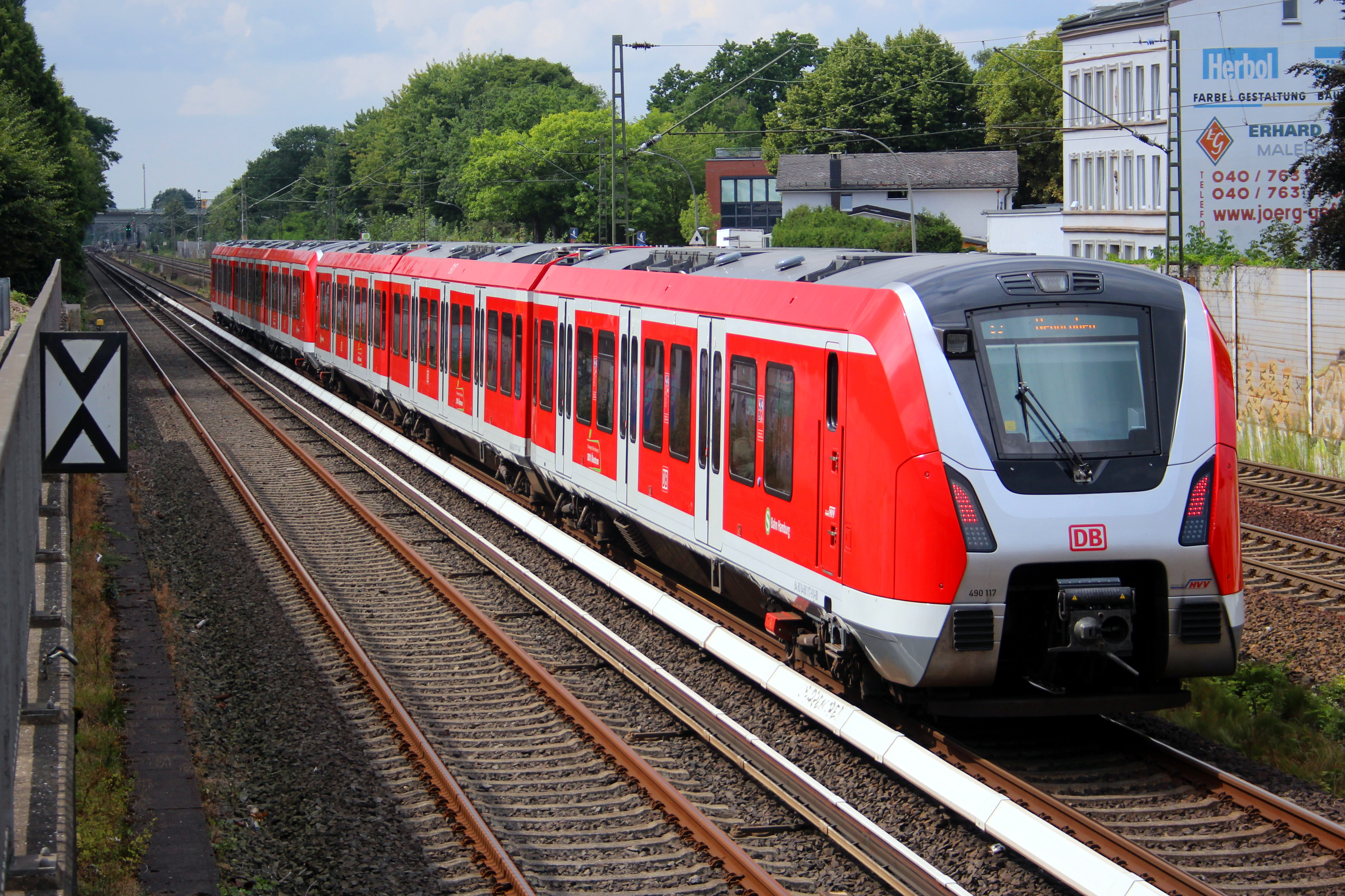
- 490117 in service near Hamburg-Harburg
- Manufacturer: Bombardier/Alstom
- Constructed: 2013–
- Operator: S-Bahn Hamburg

Specifications
- Train length: 66 m (216 ft 6 7/16 in)
- Maximum speed: 100 km/h (62 mph) (DC); 140 km/h (87 mph) (AC)
- Weight: 122 t (120 long tons; 134 short tons) (DC-only units); 130 t (128 long tons; 143 short tons) (dual-voltage units)
- Power output: 1.6 MW (2,100 hp)
- Electric systems: 1,200 V DC third rail; 15 kV 16 2/3 Hz AC overhead catenary
- Current collection: Contact shoe (DC); Pantograph (AC)
- UIC classification: 2′Bo′+Bo′Bo′+Bo′2′
- Braking systems: Electric, Air
- Safety systems: Sifa, PZB
- Track gauge: 1,435 mm (4 ft 8 1/2 in) standard gauge

The DBAG Class 490 is a three-car dual-voltage electric multiple unit train for the Hamburg S-Bahn. It was manufactured jointly by Bombardier Transportation and Alstom in 2013.

== Design ==
A single unit consists of 3 cars with the outer two having cabs. Trains can operate on the 1200 V side contact third rail and 15 kV overhead wires. It is currently the only train on the Hamburg S-Bahn with air conditioning.
