= DRG Class ET 167 =

1938–1944 train class

DR Class 167
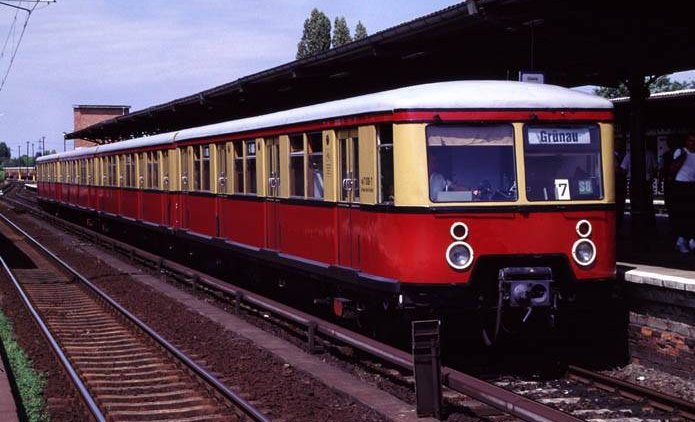
- Manufacturers: O&K, Dessauer Waggonfabrik, Wegmann – Wagenkästen; AEG, SSW – elektrischer Teil
- Constructed: 1938–1941
- Scrapped: 2003
- Number built: 283 power cars, 261 trailer cars

Specifications
- Train length: 36.2 m (118 ft 9 in)
- Maximum speed: 90 km/h (56 mph)
- Weight: 59 t (58 long tons; 65 short tons)
- Electric system: 750 V DC third rail
- Current collection: Contact shoe
- UIC classification: Bo′Bo′+2′2′
- Safety system: mechanical train stop
- Track gauge: 1,435 mm (4 ft 8 1/2 in) standard gauge

The DR Class 167 is a train class that was built in 1938–1944, during World War II and Nazi Germany times. Because of the width restrictions for the Nordsüd-S-Bahntunnel, 291 trains were delivered from 1937. Additionally, 72 trains were also delivered from 1938 to 1941, and in the end only 283 power cars were delivered.

20 percent of the trains were transported to Moscow in 1945. These trains were divided between East Berlin and West Berlin between 1961 and 1990, and after that the fleet was reformed again. All trains were deployed to the East Berlin area.

The modernisation plan calls for the replacement of Class 276.0 and 277. In November 2003, the last trains were retired, shortly after 95% of the Class 481s had entered revenue service.
