= Vossloh G6 =

Diesel shunting locomotive

Vossloh G 6
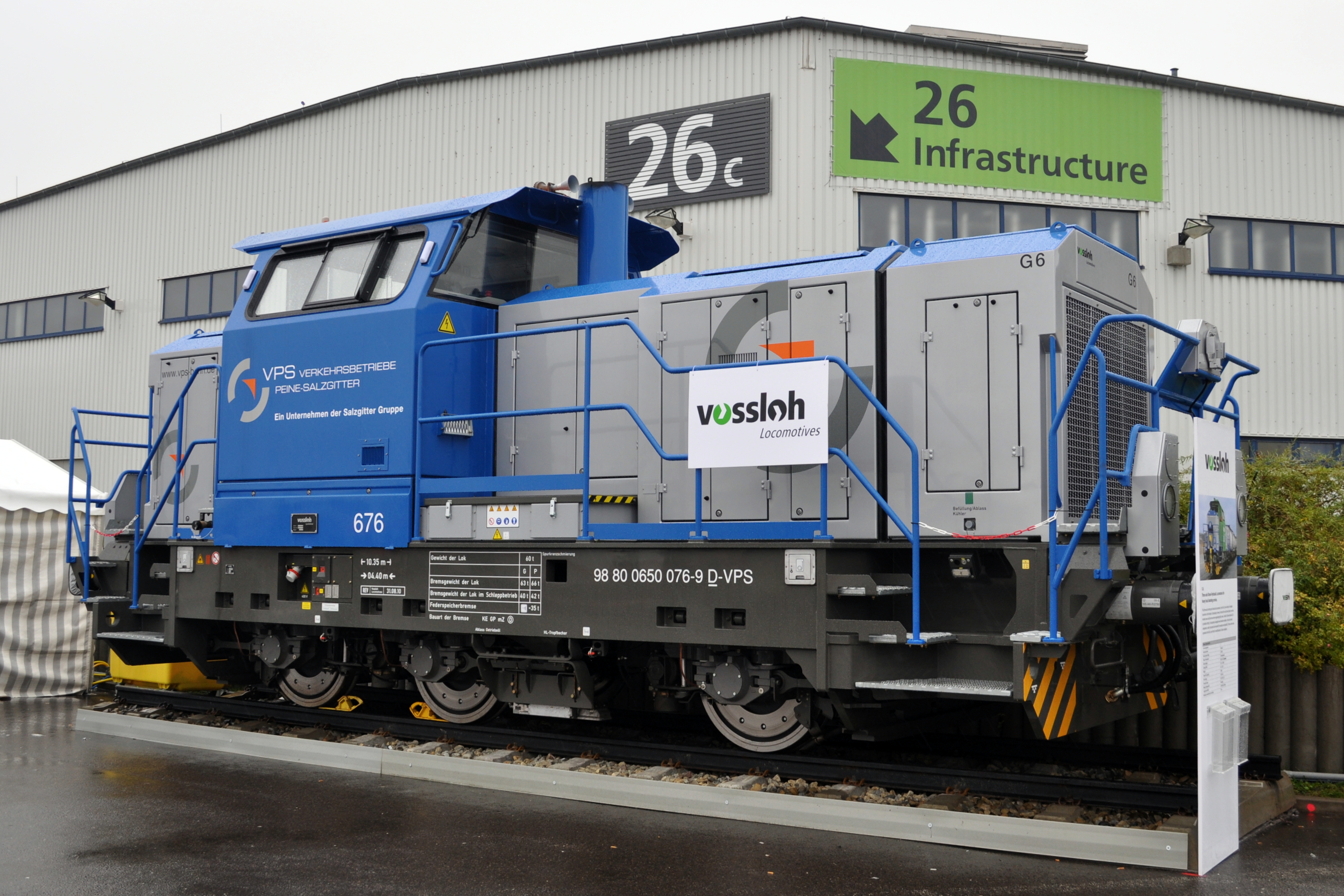
- G6 locomotive of VPS at InnoTrans 2010
Type and origin
- Power type: Diesel-hydraulic
- Builder: Vossloh, Kiel
- Build date: 2008–2017
- Total produced: G6: 133 (Note: Lok-Datenbank.de have 81 Cummins-engined and 52 MTU-engined unit in their lists. In 2017, the multi-engined G 6 ME was equipped with a Cummins QSK23-L engine, bringing the total number of Cummins-engined G6 units produced to 82. The Caterpillar engined version was not chosen by any customer, so none were produced.); G6 ME: 1
Specifications
- Configuration
  - UIC: C
- Gauge: 1,435 mm (4 ft 8 1/2 in)
- Wheel diameter: 1,000 to 920 mm (39 to 36 in) (new/worn)
- Minimum curve: 50 m (164 ft 1 in)
- Length: 10.350 or 10.790 m (33.96 or 35.40 ft) (without/with crash-absorbing buffers)
- Width: 3.080 m (10.10 ft)
- Height: 4.225 m (13.86 ft)
- Axle load: 20–22.5 t (19.7–22.1 long tons; 22.0–24.8 short tons)
- Loco weight: 60–67.5 t (59.1–66.4 long tons; 66.1–74.4 short tons)
- Fuel capacity: 1,800 L (400 imp gal; 480 US gal)
- Fuel consumption: 191–194 g/kWh (MTU) (Note: Brake-specific fuel consumption, best point +5%, with EN 590 standard diesel fuel with a calorific value of 42.8 MJ/kg); 198 g/kWh (Caterpillar)
- RPM range: 1,800–2,100 rpm
- Engine type: Cummins QSK23-L or MTU 12V 1600 R50 or Caterpillar C27
- Transmission: Voith L3r4z(s)eU2
- Loco brake: Pneumatic disc brake, hydrodynamic
- Safety systems: Zeit-Zeit-Sifa, I 60R/PZB90 SW-Vers. 2.01.10, KVB (G 6 F units only)
- Couplers: Buffers and screw, RK900 shunting coupler (option)
Performance figures
- Maximum speed: 40 or 80 km/h (25 or 50 mph) (Note: Maximum dead-in-tow speed is 100 km/h (62 mph) for units equipped with two stage transmission.)
- Power output: 671 kW (900 hp) (Cummins); 690 kW (930 hp) (MTU); 652 or 708 kW (874 or 949 hp) (Caterpillar) (Note: Although the specifications of the Caterpillar C27 engine meant to be installed in the G 6 is not known, the engine has been tuned to a rated power of 652 or 708 kW (874 or 949 hp) at 1800 min-¹ RPM for rail applications without exception. The engine is rated at 652 kW in early Newag 6Dg units and in the Orion Kolej 6Dm locomotive and 708 kW in later Newag 6Dg units, Instytut Pojazdów Szynowych Tabor 6Dh, Fablok–Instytut Pojazdów Szynowych Tabor–Pojazdy Szynowe Pesa Bydgoszcz 6Di, and in the British Rail Class 88 locomotives.)
- Tractive effort
  - Starting: 194 to 219 kN (44,000 to 49,000 lb_{f}) (Note: 60–67.5 tonnes service weight, semi-worn wheels, at a friction coefficient of 0.33 µ); 250 kN (56,000 lb_{f}) (maximum)
- Data refers to diesel hydraulic version. Source: Vossloh brochure, except where noted

The Vossloh G6 is a C diesel-hydraulic shunting locomotive, and the first locomotive of Vossloh's fifth generation programme. The G6 is the successor of the MaK/Vossloh G765, a third generation MaK locomotive still offered in the 2000s.

At Innotrans 2012, a twin 350 kW diesel-engined version with electrical transmission was shown, with additional variants proposed including single-engined, hybrid, and battery-powered versions.

== History ==
The first locomotive of the class was shown on InnoTrans 2008. Verkehrsbetriebe Peine-Salzgitter (VPS) was the launch customer and ordered 18 locomotives in April 2010, the contract was valued at approximately €25 million; the locomotives were ordered as part of a replacement program for VPS's fleet of 43 three axle diesels. The first locomotive for VPS was exhibited at InnoTrans 2010, along with the other new members of the 5th generation family, the diesel-hydraulic G12 and the diesel-electric DE 18.

In 2012, at Innotrans Vossloh displayed a multiengined diesel-electric version, the G6 ME; the design uses two 350 kW truck engines, meeting Euro 97/68 IIIB emission standards (Euro stage V) with other main specifications unchanged, utilising the same underframe, cab, brakes and controls of the diesel hydraulic version. Other potential variants of the electric transmission design included a single engined version (350 or 700 kW), and hybrid (350 kW plus electric energy storage) and a non-diesel version G6 Akku with electric battery and electrical energy storage devices.

A second major order for 16 G6 (and 4 DE12 and 2 DE18) locomotives was placed by BASF in Dec 2011. In early 2014 the first locomotive to be fitted with the new design MTU R 1600 R50 engine was put in service at BASF Ludwigshafen.

Certification for use on the French railnetwork was obtained in 2014.

=== Operators ===
Owner	Qty.	Engine type	Date of entry into service	Notes
VPS	37	Cummins	2011–2015	In 2010, Verkehrsbetriebe Peine-Salzgitter bought 18 G 6 locomotives for €25 million. VPS 601–619 were delivered between 2011 and 2013. The company ordered a further 22 locomotives in June 2011, with an option for five additional vehicles. In 2014 VPS sold 3 units to Captrain Deutschland. VPS 616 was scrapped in 2015 following an accident, a new locomotive was ordered to replace it.
Nexrail AssetCo	7	Cummins	2021–2022	In 2021, Nexrail AssetCo purchased 5 units from Vossloh, which previously operated them as rental locomotives. One of these is the originally twin-engined G 6 ME, which was also exhibited at InnoTrans 2012. This was converted to a single-engine version in 2017, the locomotive was fitted with a Cummins QSK23-L engine. In September 2022, Nexrail AssetCo bought two more locomotives from Skinest Adriatic.
Nexrail AssetCo	13	MTU	2021–2022	In 2021, Nexrail AssetCo purchased 12 units from Vossloh, which previously operated them as rental locomotives. The company bought one more unit in 2022.
BASF	13	MTU	2013–2014	In December 2011, BASF ordered 16 locomotives to serve its plants in Ludwigshafen, Schwarzheide and Antwerp. In 2016 the company sold 2 unit to Vossloh and one to Rostocker Fracht- und Fischereihafen in 2023.
CTD	11	Cummins	2015–2016, 2019	Captrain Deutschland purchased three locomotives from VPS in 2014 and ordered six new locomotives from Vossloh on July 18, 2014, which were delivered between 2015 and 2016. In 2021, Captrain Deutschland purchased 2 units from Vossloh, which previously operated them as rental locomotives. One of these was the 100th G 6 produced, which was also exhibited at InnoTrans 2014. This locomotive is officially operated by the company's subsidiary Captrain Deutschland CargoWest.
CTD	1	MTU	2021	Originally built for BASF, it was bought back by Vossloh in 2016 and operated as a rental locomotive. Captrain Deutschland bought it in 2021.
Evonik	1	Cummins	2011	Manufactured for Evonik Industries, it was transferred to its subsidiary Evonik Infracor GmbH in 2013.
Evonik	4	MTU	2015, 2018	Manufactured for Evonik Industries.
Beacon Rail	5	MTU	2021	Originally rental locomotives for Vossloh, they were purchased by Beacon Rail in 2021 and leased to Sweden-based Hector Rail.
DB Regio	4	Cummins	2016	Originally rental locomotives for Vossloh, they were purchased by DB Regio in 2016.
TKSE	4	MTU	2017	Vossloh owned the locomotives, until they were purchased by Thyssenkrupp Steel Europe in 2017.
K+S	3	Cummins	2012	They were purchased by K+S Kali GmbH for its subsidiary K+S Minerals and Agriculture GmbH, which uses them in its plants in Zielitz (Kaliwerk Zielitz), Sehnde (Kaliwerk Bergmannssegen-Hugo) and Philippsthal (Verbundbergwerk Werra).
Schweerbau	2	Cummins	2017, 2019	They were originally rental locomotives for Vossloh. Schweerbau bought its first unit in 2017 and the second in 2019.
Schweerbau	1	MTU	2018	Exhibited at InnoTrans 2018.
ZS	2	Cummins	2011	One unit was leased to Zellstoff Stendal (ZS) by Vossloh in August 2010, this locomotive was purchased by ZS in February 2011. The company bought its second unit in October 2011.
Northrail	2	Cummins	2013–2014	Rental locomotives.
InfraLeuna	2	MTU	2014–2015	Manufactured for InfraLeuna.
CFL Cargo France	2	Cummins	2017	Originally rental locomotives for Vossloh, they were purchased by CFL Cargo France in December 2017.
BSW	2	MTU	2018	Originally rental locomotives for Vossloh, they were purchased by Badische Stahlwerke in July 2018.
Gelsen-Log	2	MTU	2019	Originally rental locomotives for Vossloh, they were purchased by Gelsenkirchener Logistik-, Hafen- und Servicegesellschaft mbH in 2019 for approximately €2.5 million. The two G 6 units replaced a nearly 65-year-old Krauss-Maffei ML 440 C and a more than 30-year-old Henschel DHG 700 C. The two G 6s were later given a unique foil wrap depicting a phoenix and an octopus to raise awareness of the importance of climate protection.
EVB	2	MTU	2021	Originally rental locomotives for Vossloh, they were purchased by Eisenbahnen und Verkehrsbetriebe Elbe-Weser in 2021.
SKW	1	Cummins	2011	The first G 6 produced, exhibited at InnoTrans 2008. Stickstoffwerke Piesteritz bought it in January 2011.
Luka Koper d.d.	1	Cummins	2013	The company's first new locomotive purchased, used in the port of Koper.
Ferrotract	1	Cummins	2014	"G 6 F" version built in 2012, type-approved in France.
Alzchem	1	Cummins	2015	The locomotive was also exhibited at InnoTrans in 2010 and was operated by Vossloh as a rental locomotive between 2010 and 2015. Alzchem purchased it in October 2015.
ZPR	1	Cummins	2015	Originally a rental locomotive for Vossloh, Zellstoff- und Papierfabrik Rosenthal GmbH purchased it in 2015.
Deutsche Leasing France	1	Cummins	2016	"G 6 F" version, type-approved in France. Vossloh operated it as a rental locomotive. Deutsche Leasing France Operating SAS purchased it in June 2016.
Fels-Werke	1	Cummins	2016	Originally a rental locomotive for Vossloh, Fels-Werke bought it in 2016 to serve its Rübeland plant.
Vossloh	1	Cummins	2017	Rental locomotive.
Skinest Adriatic	1	Cummins	2017	Originally a rental locomotive for Vossloh, Skinest Adriatic purchased it in 2017 and operates it as a rental locomotive in Croatia.
Bayernoil	1	MTU	2018	Vossloh leased the locomotive to Bayernoil Raffineriegesellschaft in 2017, and the company bought it in 2018.
BES	1	MTU	2015	Built for Brandenburger Elektrostahlwerke.
RFH	1	Cummins	2019	Originally a rental locomotive for Vossloh, Rostocker Fracht- und Fischereihafen GmbH purchased it in December 2019.
RFH	1	MTU	2023	RFH purchased it from BASF in March 2023.

=== Scrapped units ===
Owner	Qty.	Engine type	Date of entry into service	Date of scrapping	Reason for scrapping
VPS	1	Cummins	2012	2015	Accident.

== See also ==
- Voith Gravita, of which the 5C variant is a direct competitor to the G6.
