= DRG Class ET 171 =

Deutsche Reichsbahn Gesellschaft Baureihe ET 171
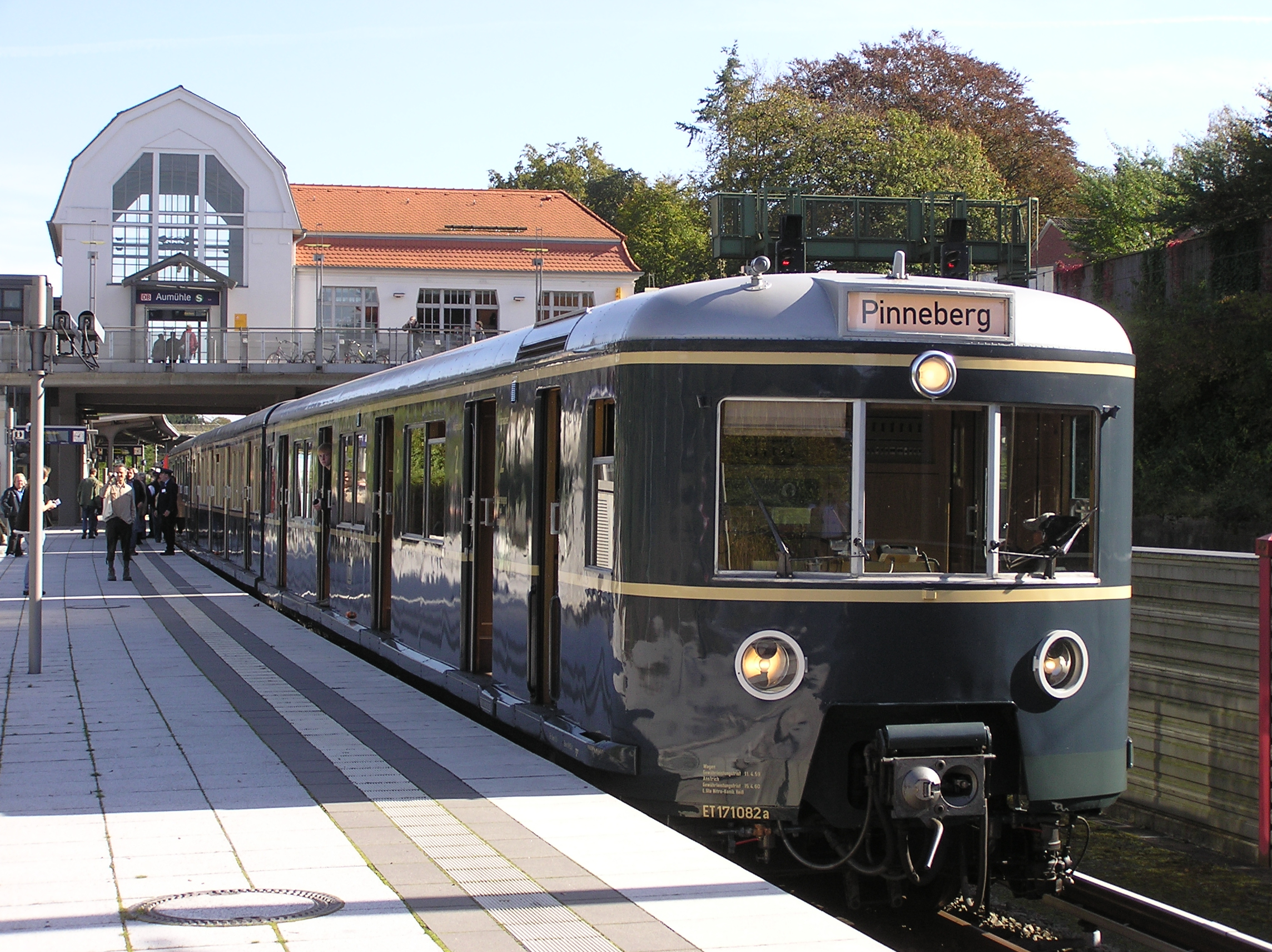
- Preserved ET 171 082 in Aumühle station
Type and origin
- Power type: Electric
- Builder: LHB, MAN, Wegmann, BBC
- Build date: 1939-1943; 1954-1955; 1958
- Total produced: 72
Specifications
- Configuration
  - UIC: Bo′Bo′+2′2′+Bo′Bo′
- Gauge: 1,435 mm (4 ft 8 1/2 in) standard gauge
- Length: 61 m (200 ft 2 in)
- Loco weight: 130 t (130 long tons; 140 short tons)
- Electric system/s: 1,2 kV DC third rail
- Current pickup: Third rail
- Train brakes: Air, electric
- Safety systems: Sifa, PZB
Performance figures
- Maximum speed: 80 km/h (50 mph)
- Power output: 1,160 kW (1,560 hp)
- Tractive effort: 170 kN (38,000 lbf)
Career
- Operators: Deutsche Reichsbahn Gesellschaft; Deutsche Bundesbahn; Deutsche Bahn AG; Hamburg S-Bahn
- Class: ET/EM 171, since 1968: 471/871
- Retired: 1989-2001

The DRG Class ET 171 (since 1968 DB Class 471/871) was a three-car electric multiple unit built for the S-Bahn Hamburg (rapid transit railway).

== History ==
The first electrically operated Hamburg S-Bahn trains had appeared on the Hamburg-Altona City and Suburban Railway in 1907. In 1937, the main-line railway operator, Deutsche Reichsbahn, decided to switch current collection from overhead catenary (AC 6,3 kV/25 Hz) to third rail (DC 1,2 kV), basically adopting the S-Bahn system established in Berlin from 1924 onwards. The new class ET 171 trains were built to replace antiquated overhead stock based on non-corridor coaches. The first ET 171 unit appeared in Hamburg in December 1939.

Between then and 1943 further 46 trainsets were built. They received a distinctive dark blue livery with a broad cream stripe on the centre car to denote the 2nd (from 1955: 1st) class. Production was halted by World War II. It was not resumed until 1954/55 when a further batch of 21 units (ET 171 061–082) were built to finally abandon overhead operation. Five additional units (ET 171 082–086) were built in 1958 to work the new line between Hamburg Central Station and Bergedorf (today line S2). From 1968 the class was designated as 471 (and the non-motorized centre cars as 871 respectively). In the 1970s and 80s, most trains received the new cream and teal livery, introduced with Class 472 in 1974.

== 1980s modernisation scheme ==
At the beginning of the 1980s the class was due for replacement. State owned train operator Deutsche Bundesbahn opted for a modernisation scheme instead, as its Stuttgart-Bad Canstatt works had abundant capacity for carrying out the task. The programme started in late 1984 and focused on body work, replacing the 1930s style windows with modern rubber sealed replacements in newly welded in sections. The scheme was soon considered uneconomic and ended prematurely in October 1987 after 22 units.

== Withdrawal and preservation ==
Four units ceased operation between 1989 and 1991 but mass-withdrawals did not start until 1997 when new class 474 units entered service. The modernized EMUs did not last longer than the non-rebuild ones. The last unit 471 062 was retired from regular service in October 2001, having accumulated 4.6 million kilometres.

One complete unit and four single coaches survive until today:

- EMU 471 082 was restored to 1950s condition as a heritage train and saw service until March 2015. It is now awaiting overhaul.
- One motor car from the very first train, now 471 401, is preserved in Aumühle train museum near Hamburg. It still has the wooden benches this coach had retained until withdrawal.
- The centre car of unit 471 039 is privately owned.
- Motor car 471 144 is in the Alstom company museum at Salzgitter and not accessible to the public.
- Motor coach 471 462 from the last unit in service is on display at the German Museum of Technology's permanent exhibition. Previously it had been restored to 1990s condition at S-Bahn Hamburg's Ohlsdorf works. Running on its own wheels it had been moved to Berlin in May 2019.

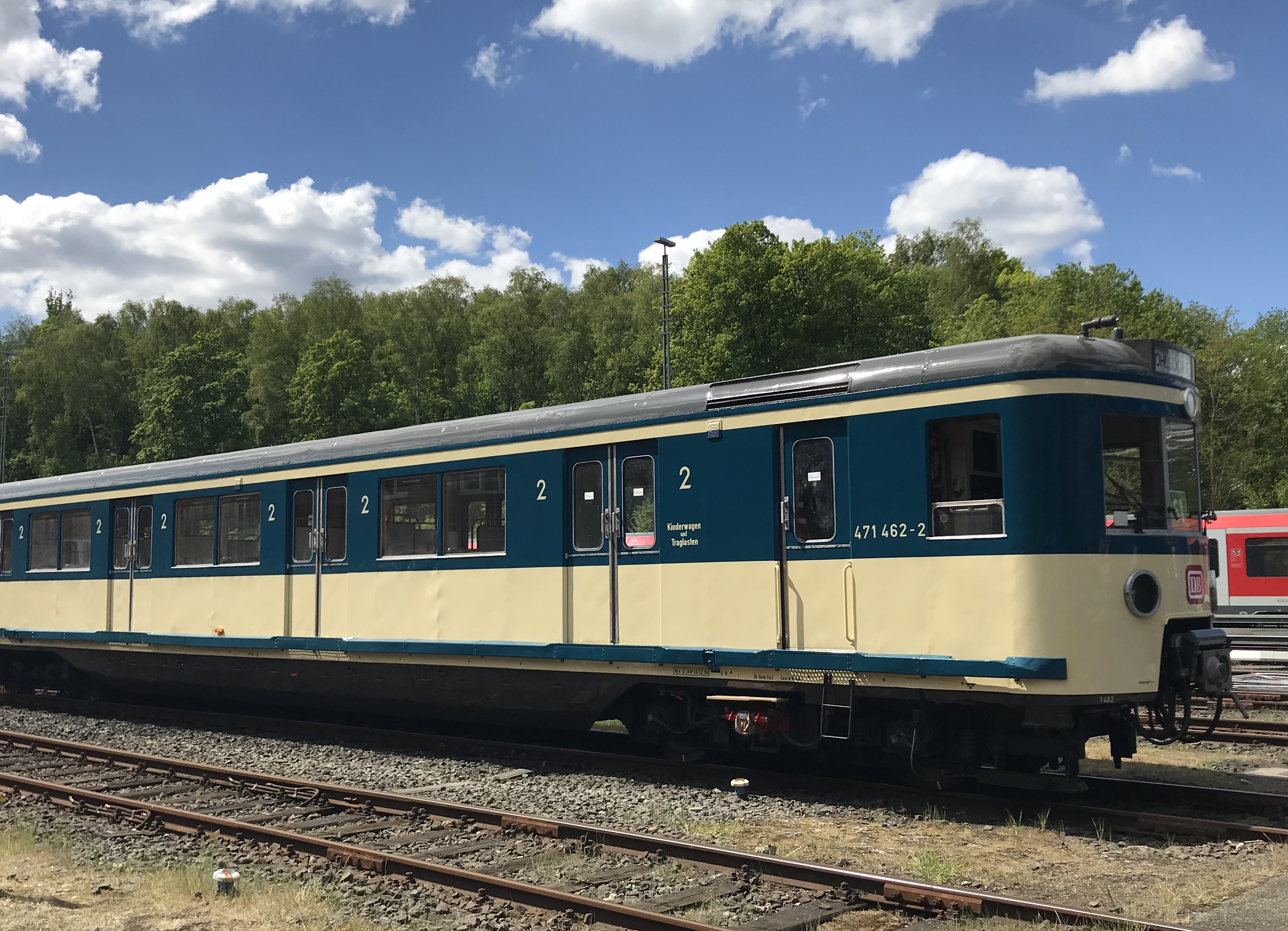
Preserved driving car 471 462 at Hamburg-Ohlsdorf S-Bahn works.

== Technical equipment ==
The ET 171 were among the first German light-weight steel constructions for railways. The coaches were designed as self-sustained bodies. The prewar units had block brakes while those built in the 1950s used disc brakes. All doors could be automatically closed from the driver's cab but could be opened again after a short time. This was possible until the 1970s due to safety reasons. All trains had two 2nd class end coaches and a 1st class centre coach. The first class service was removed from all Hamburg S-Bahn trains in November 2000. Lighting was provided by uncovered light bulbs. All trains were equipped with Sifa. Only the last unit 471 062 was equipped with the PZB train safety system when used for excursions between 2001 and 2004.

== Gallery ==
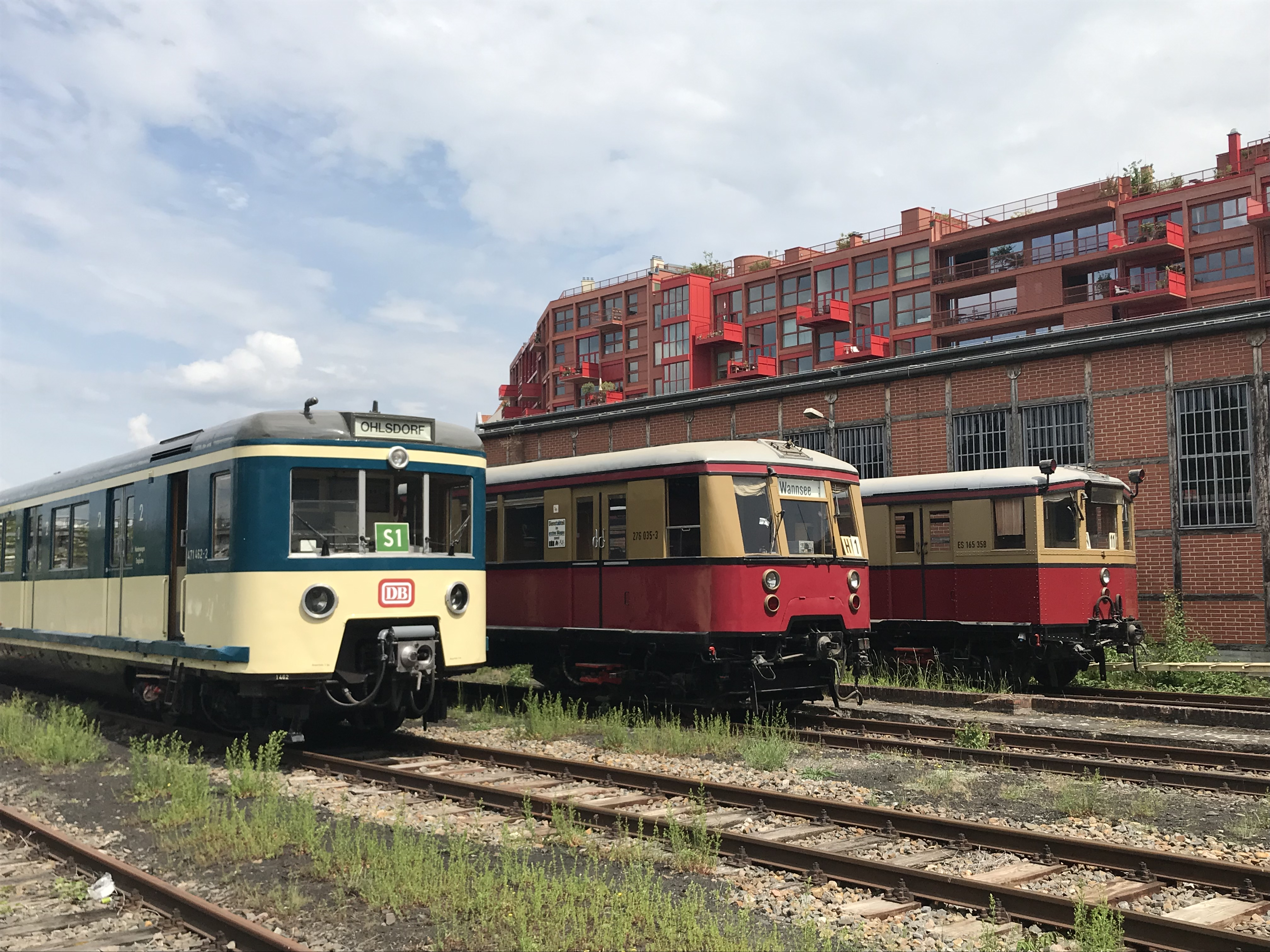
Upon its arrival at the German Museum of Techchnology Railcar 471 462 from Hamburg was placed next to its Berlin siblings ("Banker's train" coach ET 125 001 - center - from 1935 and two-coach "Stadtbahn" unit ET/ES 165 358 built in the 1920s).
