= DBAG Class 474 =

1996 German electric train class

DBAG Baureihe 474/874
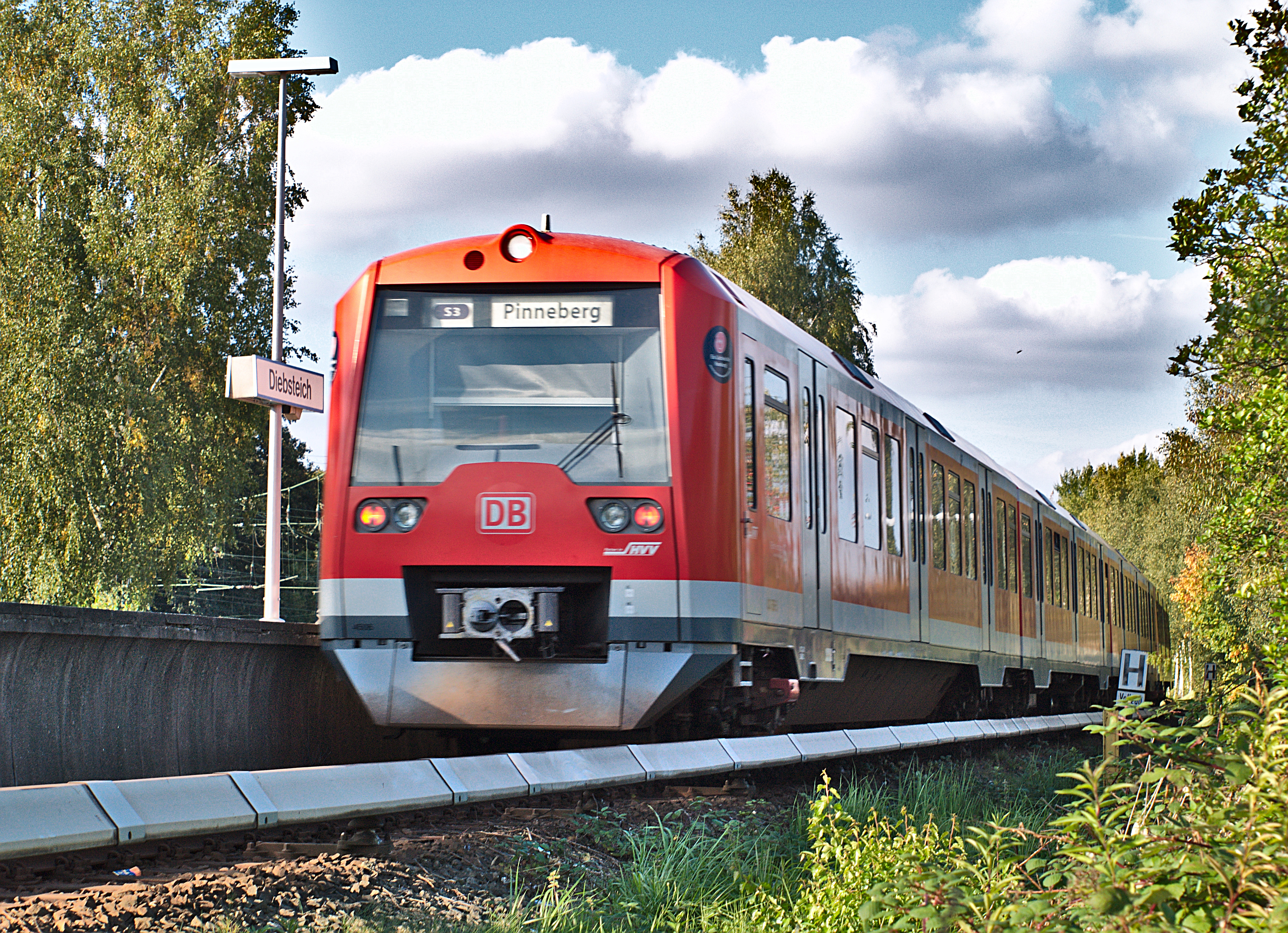
- DBAG Class 474 in Diebsteich station
- Stock type: Electric multiple unit
- Manufacturers: LHB, Bombardier
- Constructed: 1996–1998; 1999–2001; 2006–2007
- Number built: Total: 112; 474.1: 45; 474.2: 25 (not refurbished); 474.3: 9 (new trains) and 33 (refurbished from 474.2)
- Operators: Deutsche Bahn AG; Hamburg S-Bahn

Specifications
- Train length: 66 m (216 ft 6 in)
- Maximum speed: 100 km/h (62 mph)
- Weight: 102 t (100 long tons; 112 short tons) (474.2); 94 t (93 long tons; 104 short tons) (474.2); 106 t (104 long tons; 117 short tons) (474.3)
- Power output: 920 kW (1,230 bhp)
- Tractive effort: 144 kN (32,000 lb_{f})
- Electric systems: 1.2 kV DC (474.1-3); Third rail 15 kV AC 16.7 Hz (474.3) catenary
- Current collection: Contact shoe DC, pantograph AC
- UIC classification: Bo′Bo′+2′2′+Bo′Bo′
- Braking systems: Electric, Air
- Safety systems: Sifa, PZB
- Track gauge: 1,435 mm (4 ft 8 1/2 in) standard gauge

The DBAG Class 474/874 is a three-car electric multiple unit train for the Hamburg S-Bahn. The class 474 were built to replace the nearly-60-year-old class 471 trains. Some units have a pantograph (474.3) to service the 2007 opened line to Stade on an overhead catenary track.

== History ==
The first series of 45 vehicles were ordered in 1994 from Linke-Hofmann-Busch as consortium leader of the Linke-Hofmann-Busch consortium and the then ABB Henschel in Salzgitter. Delivery started in 1996 and the first train was presented to the press in 1997. The second series of 58 vehicles were ordered in 1996 and delivered to Bw Hamburg-Ohlsdorf by 2001. In 2016, the first 474s were converted to 474-Plus railcars. The conversion was completed on December 20, 2021.

== Technology ==
The class 474 represents a generation change in vehicles at the Hamburger S-Bahn. As before, the power is fed in via a third rail on the side of the track. The vehicles are supplied with direct current at 1,200 Volts. For the first time, liquid-cooled three-phase asynchronous machines connected to the axles via a two-stage gearbox and a cardan shaft drive were used as drives. Liquid-cooled GTO inverters are used to operate the asynchronous machines on the direct current grid. The vehicles of the 474 series are approved for a maximum speed of 100 km/h. In contrast to the predecessor series 472, the center car is non-motorized, as was common before the series 472. The railcars are controlled throughout by computers, which replaced the conventional control system previously prevalent in the older 470 and 472 series. The control data is no longer transmitted via individual lines but via serial bus systems (vehicle bus is DVB, train bus is WTB). It is therefore not possible to run the vehicles of the older series in mixed units with those of the 474 series. Like their predecessors, the vehicles are equipped with a Scharfenberg coupler, which is designed in such a way that there is a mechanical coupling option (for towing operations, for example) with the predecessor series.

In 1997 and 1998, there were significant problems with the 474 vehicles. Following severe vibrations, there were deficiencies in the ventilation system, the door opening mechanism and the engine, which led to an acceptance stop. The press attributed this to ordering without testing prototypes.

== Dual-system design 474.3 ==
In 2006 and 2007, the 474.3 series was put into service. These dual-system vehicles are made up of nine new vehicles and 33 conversions of existing second-series vehicles. The vehicles are additionally equipped for overhead line operation with a current of 15 kV at 16.7 Hz. The center cars have a pantograph for the overhead line and all the high-voltage equipment. They also have four-quadrant controllers that generate the direct current required for traction operation from the down-transformed alternating current of the contact wire. This also allows energy to be fed back into the traction current network when braking.

The class 474.3 multiple units have been in scheduled service since December 2007 as the S3 from Pinneberg via the “City Tunnel“ and the Niederelbebahn to the S-Bahn terminus at Stade. Here, they have replaced the regional rail trains previously operated with locomotives. From the former S-Bahn terminus at Hamburg-Neugraben, power is supplied via the overhead line.

== 474 Plus ==
Under this name, the S-Bahn Hamburg GmbH is implementing the modernization of all class 474 vehicles. The vehicles were thoroughly refurbished. Passages were created between the individual cars and new passenger information systems were installed. A multi-purpose area was installed in the center car and the door area was fitted with a new anti-trap switch strip and a light grid. Furthermore, the vehicles have been repainted. Originally, the trains were also to be equipped with air conditioning. Train 4012 was presented to the press in July 2011 at the Ohlsdorf depot as the first prototype for the conversions. Modernization of the remaining vehicles was initially expected to begin in 2012. However, due to technical difficulties (including excessive weight of the air-conditioning system), the conversion prototype could not be approved. Some test components were removed again.

For technical reasons and in order to avoid a new approval procedure, the installation of an air conditioning system was dispensed within the further planning. On Friday, January 9, 2015, the 4012 conversion prototype, now without the air conditioning system, was presented as the first modernized series train, which went into service soon after. At a cost of 70 million euros, all remaining 111 trains were also converted accordingly by 2021. The work was carried out in accordance with the transport contract between Hamburg and DB Regio (parent company of S-Bahn Hamburg GmbH), which applies as of 2018.

In May 2019, half of the planned conversions had been carried out, and the modernization of the entire fleet was scheduled for the end of 2021. On December 20, 2021, the completion of the modernization was announced.

== ATO trial operation ==
Four railcars 4046, 4047, 4048 and 4051 (474.4) were equipped with ETCS and ATO in 2020 in order to initially be able to undertake test runs without passengers on the Berliner Tor - Aumühle line section, which will be equipped with ETCS by August 2020. During the ITS Congress in October 2021, automatic train operation with passengers will be demonstrated on this line. Since then, they have become the official class 474.4.

All four vehicles have now been put into service with ETCS, ATO, and AVVO.

== Gallery ==
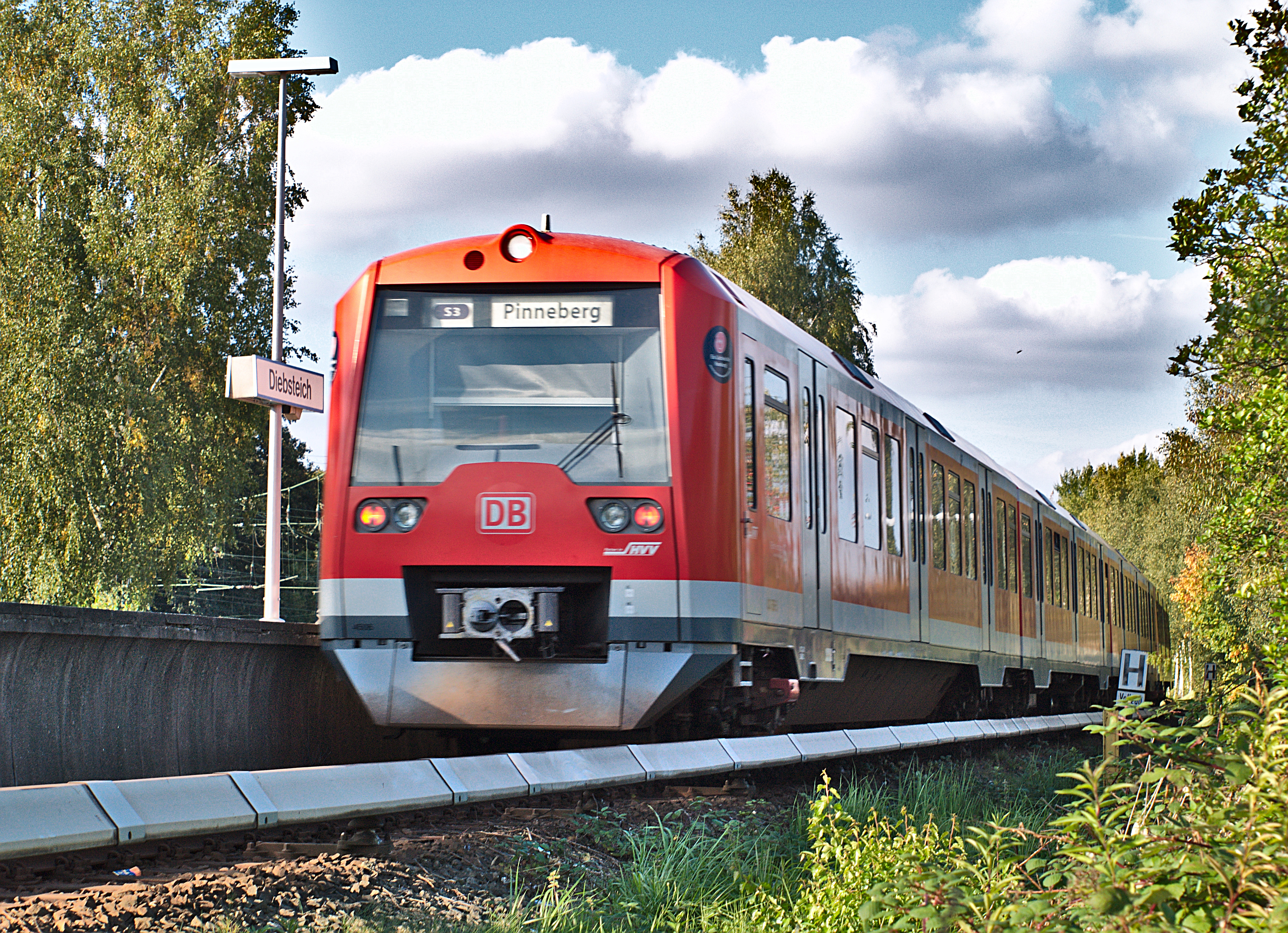
Class 474 at Hamburg Diebsteich station

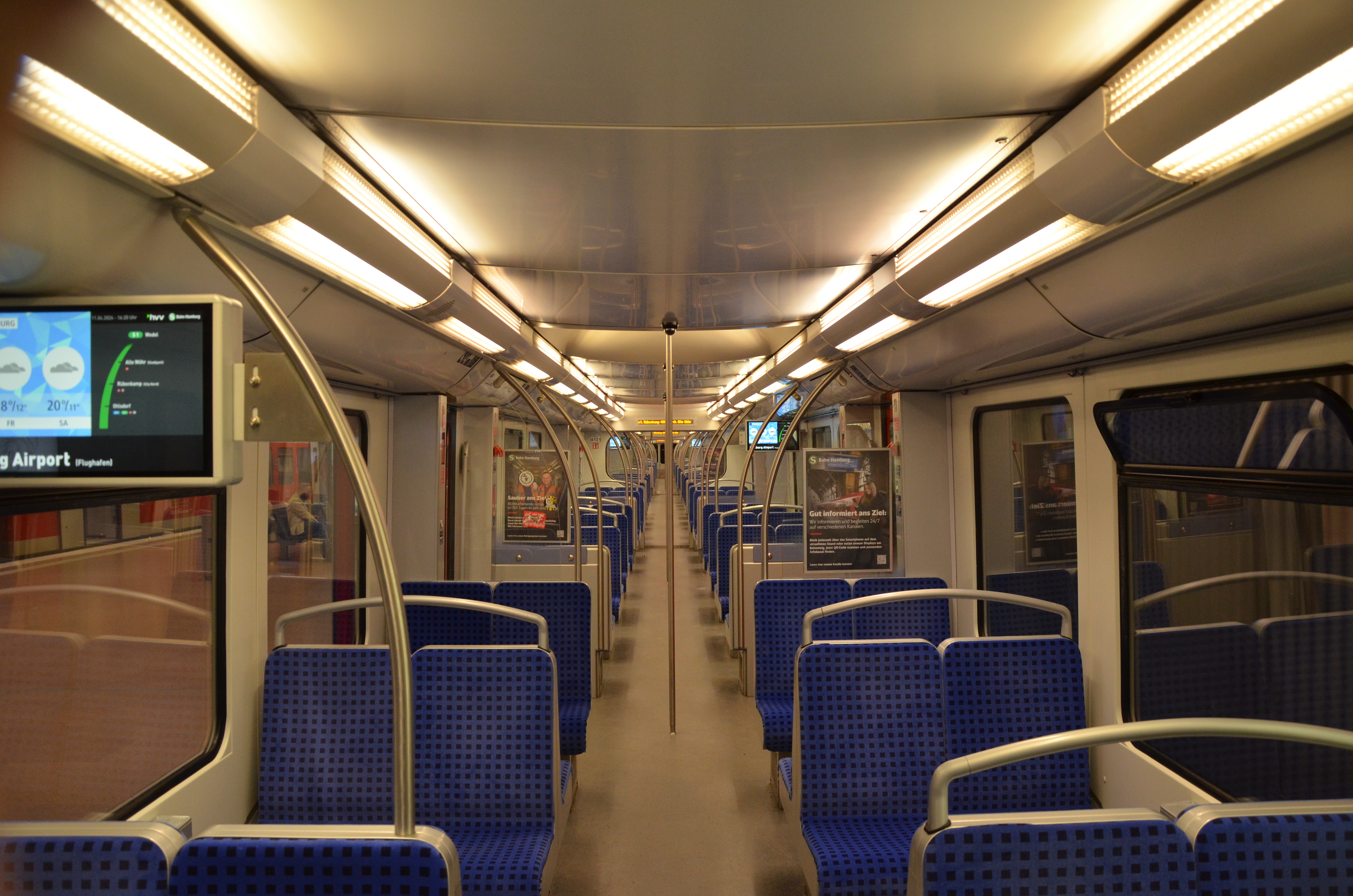
Passenger compartment after modernisation (474 Plus)

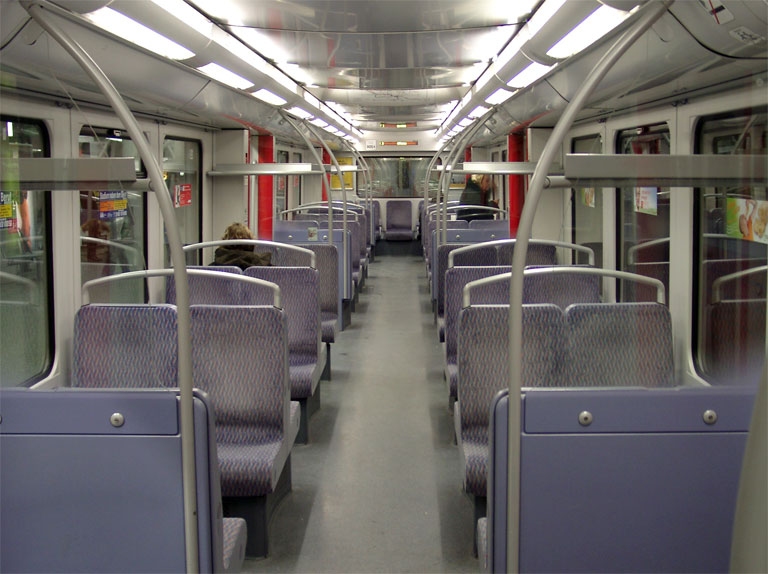
Passenger compartment (pre modernisation)

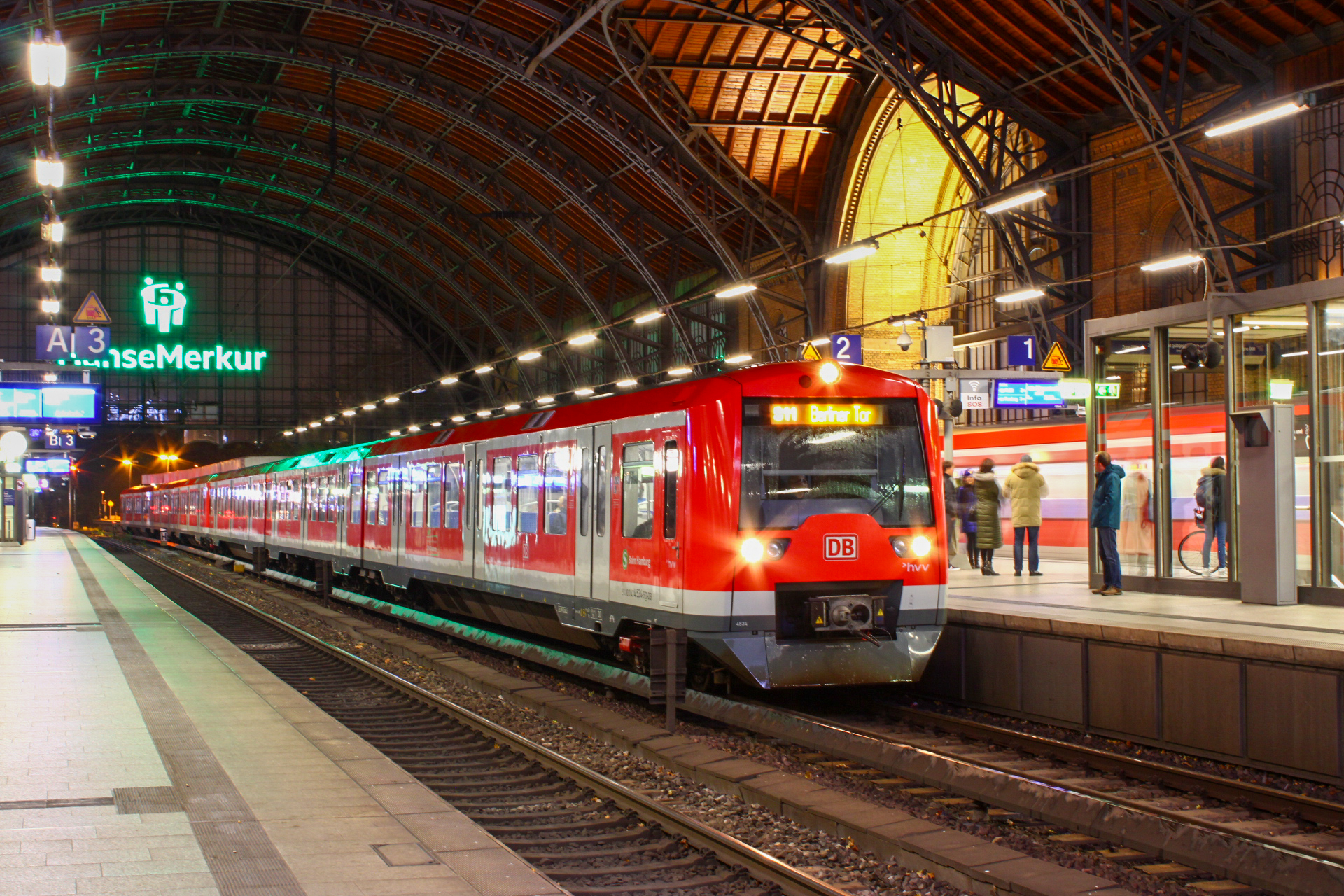
A 474 at Hamburg Dammtor station

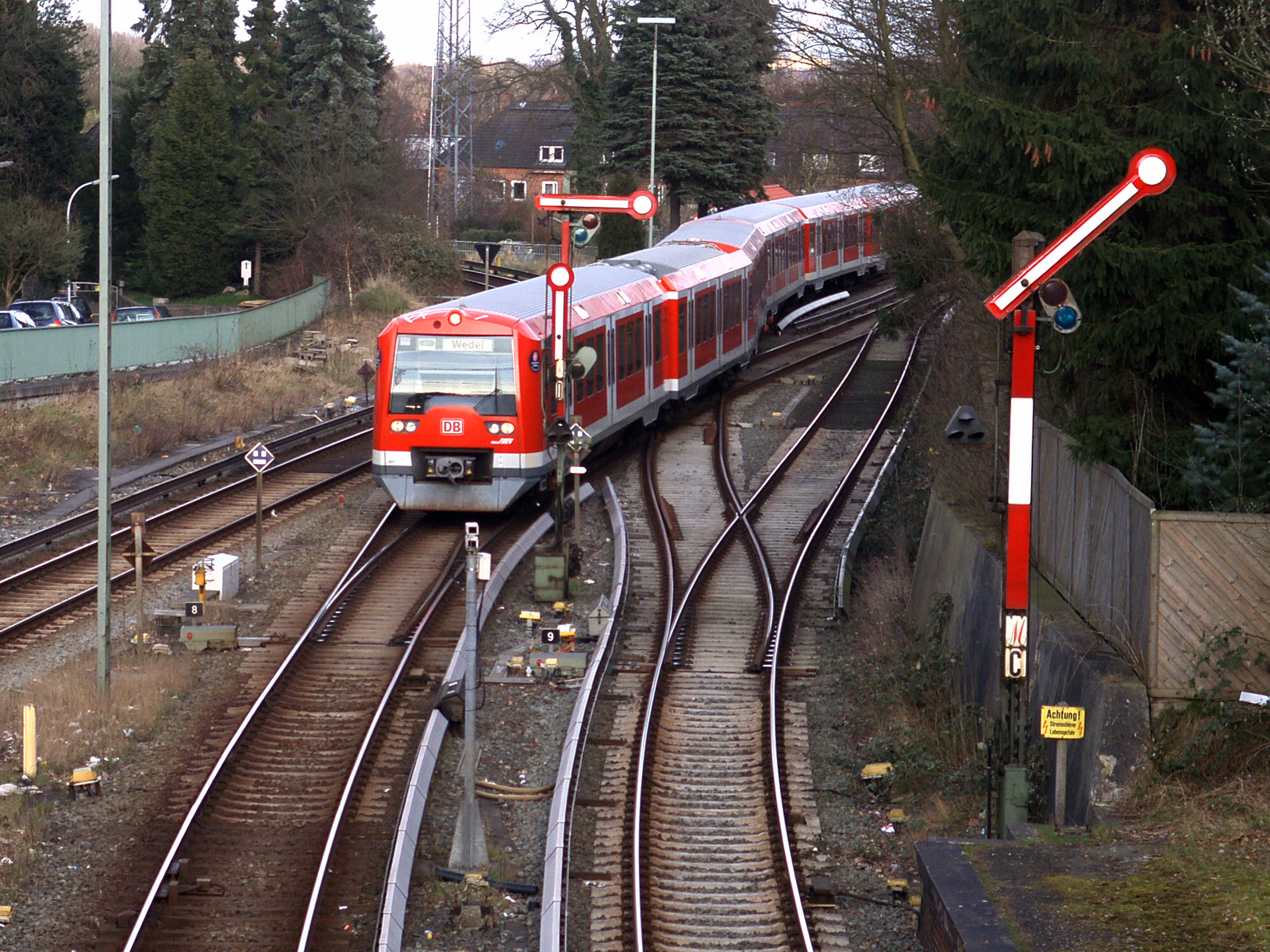
474 entering Blankenese station

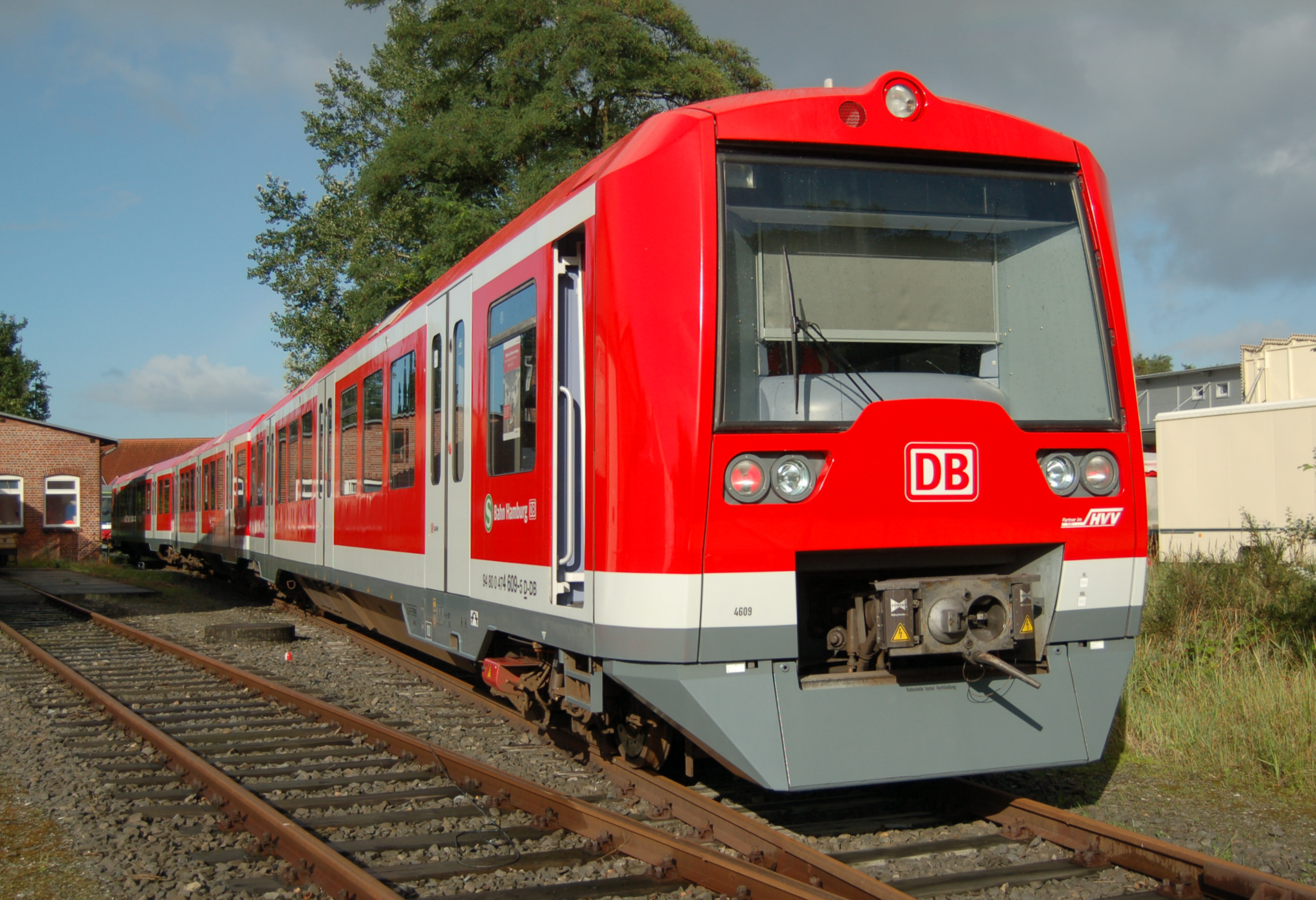
Dual-system Design 474.3

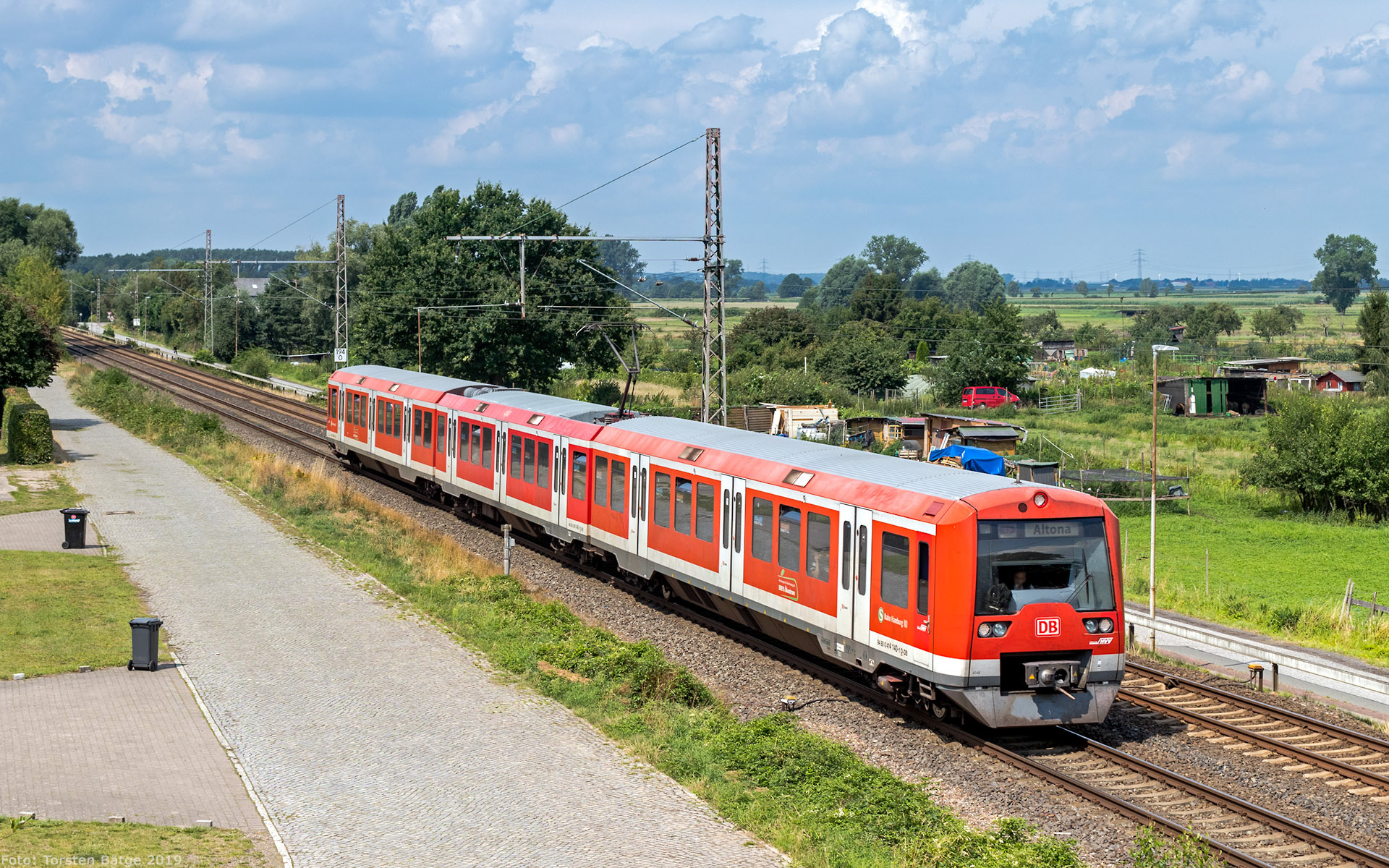
Dual-system Design on the Niederelbebahn

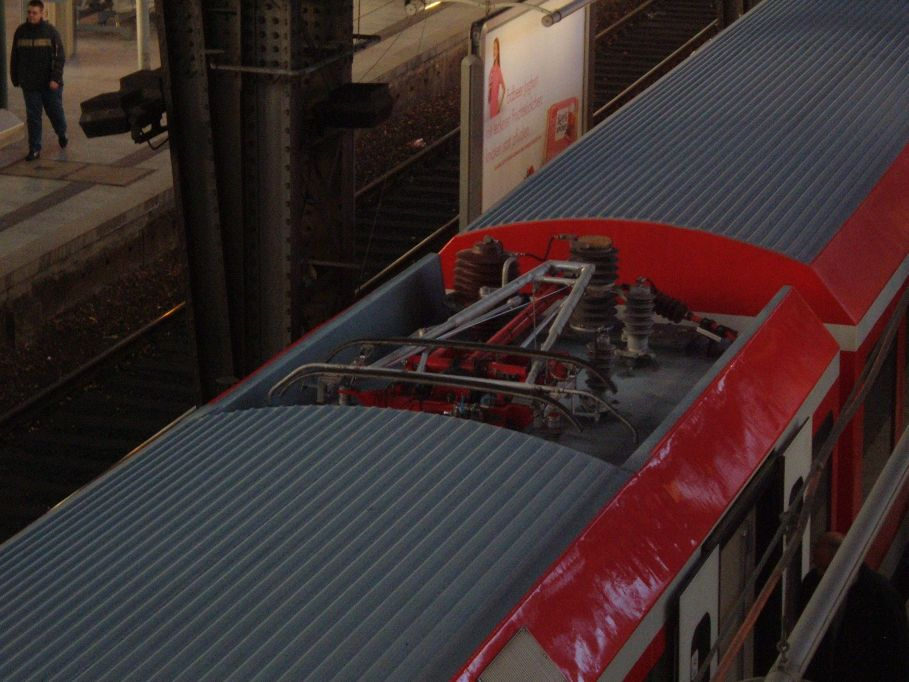
Pantograph of a 474.3 (Dual-system design)
