= Billwerder =

- Quarter of Hamburg
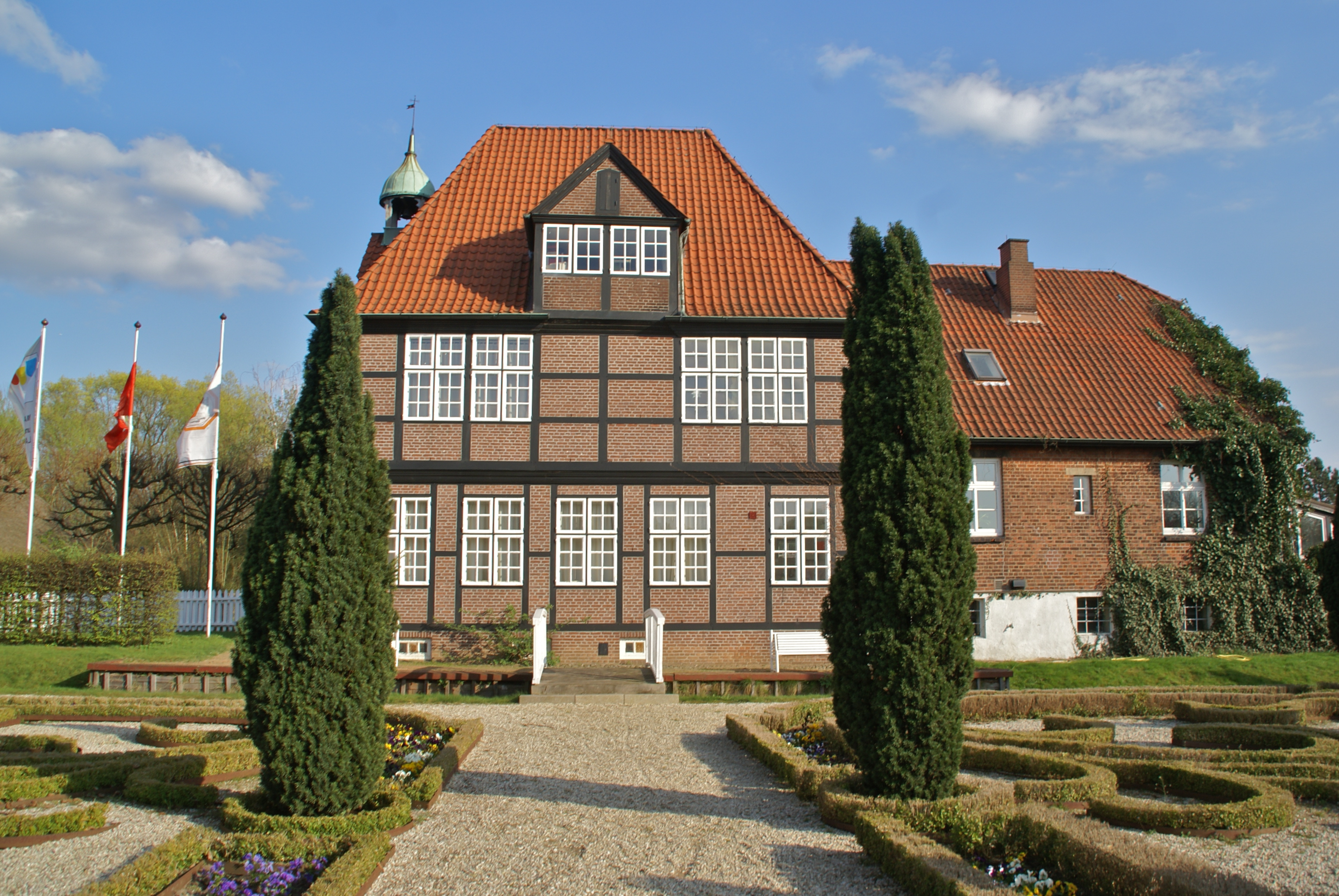
- The "Glockenhaus"

- Location of Billwerder in Hamburg
- Interactive map of Billwerder
- Location within Germany Location within Hamburg
- Coordinates: 53.499°N 10.134°E
- Country: Germany
- State: Hamburg
- City: Hamburg
- Borough: Hamburg-Bergedorf

Area
  - Total: 9.5 km^{2} (3.7 sq mi)

Population (2024-12-31)
  - Total: 4,117
  - Density: 430/km^{2} (1,100/sq mi)
- Time zone: UTC+01:00 (CET)
  - Summer (DST): UTC+02:00 (CEST)
- Dialling codes: 040
- Vehicle registration: HH

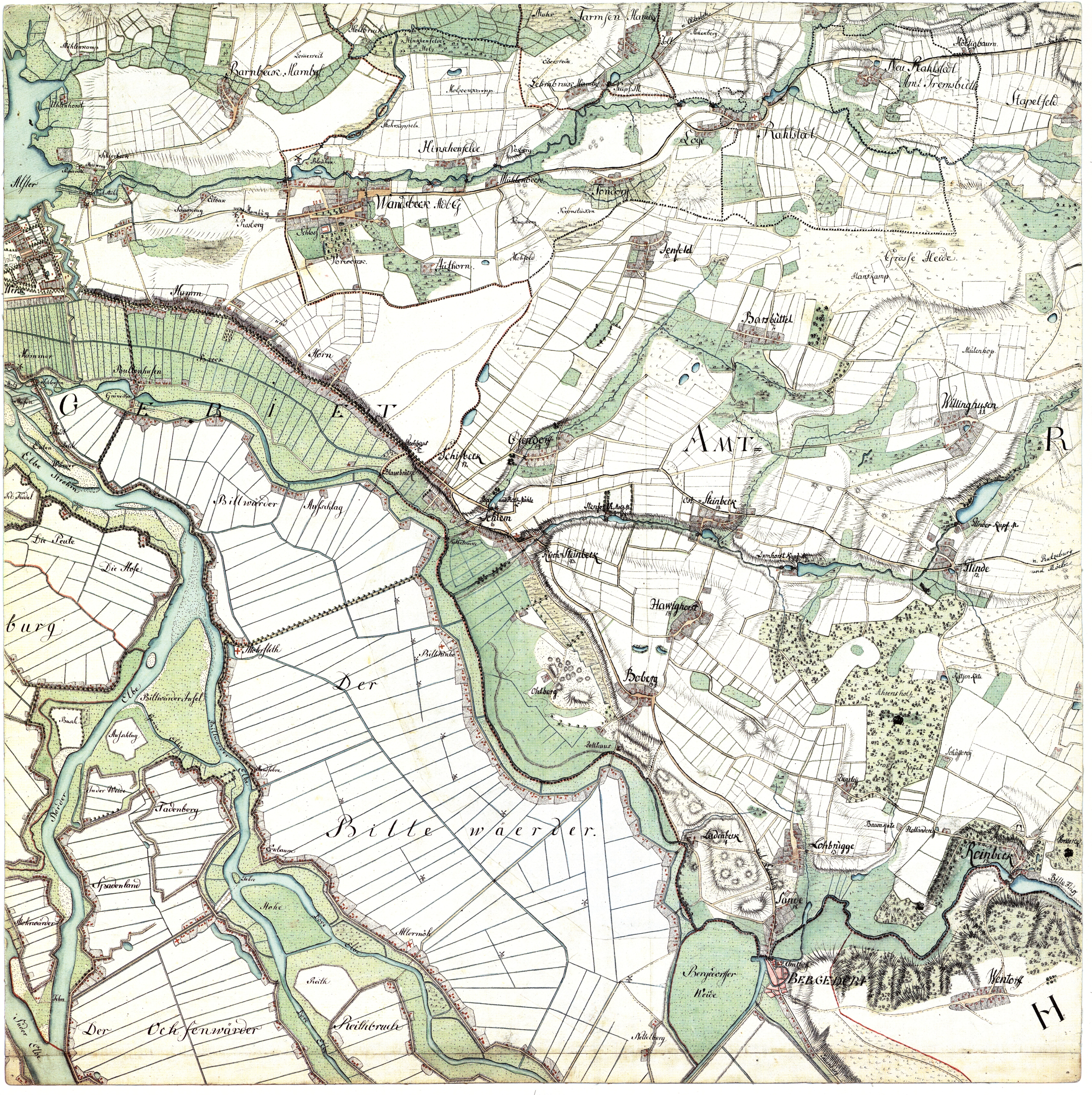
The area of Billwerder in 1790

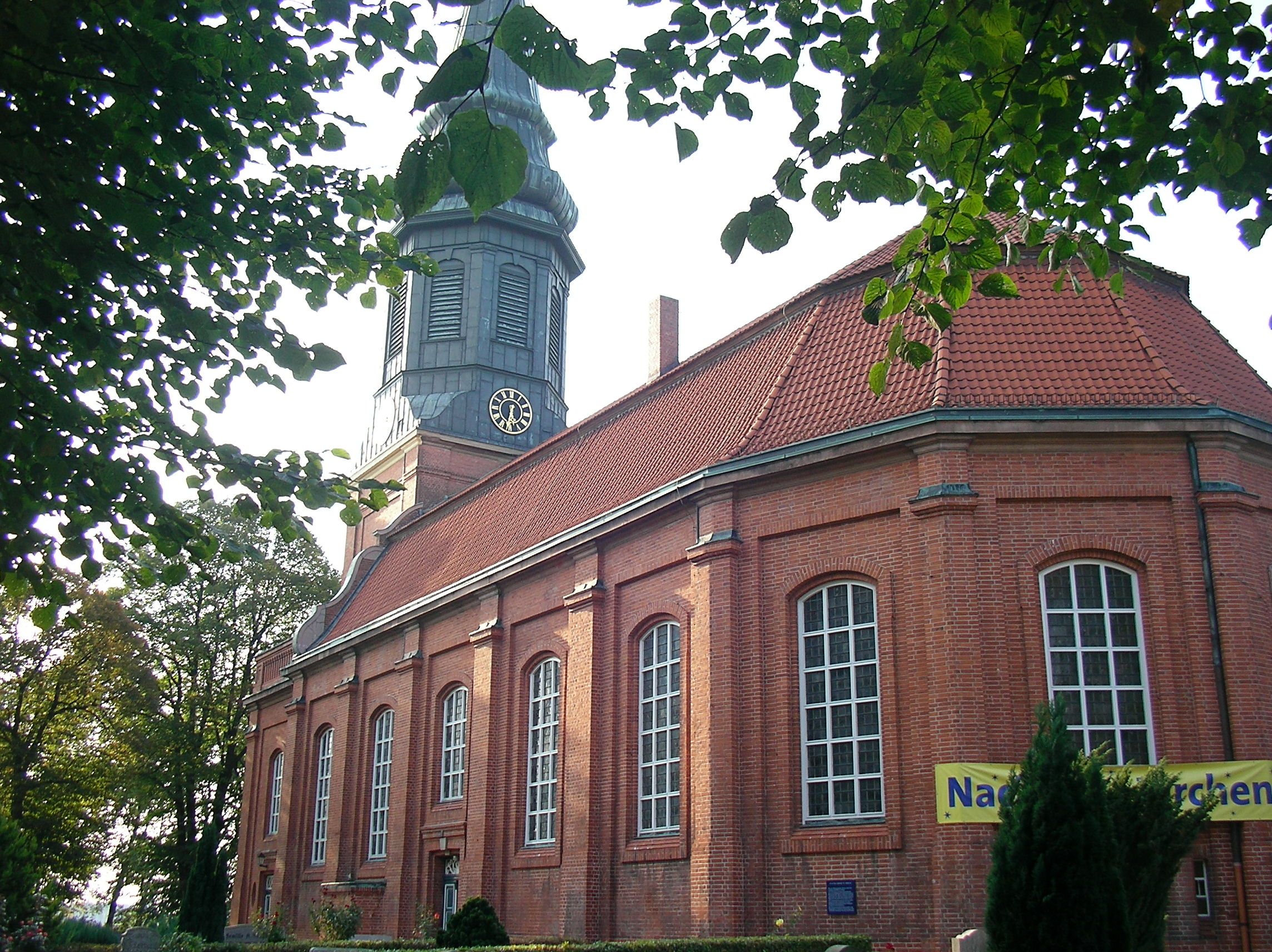
Church of St. Nicholas Billwerder, built in 1737. Earlier church buildings at this place were first recorded in the 13th century

Billwerder (German pronunciation: [bɪlˈvɛʁdɐ]) is a quarter of Hamburg, Germany, in the borough of Bergedorf. It is located on the northwestern border of the borough adjacent to the borough of Hamburg-Mitte. At the same time Billwerder means a greater area south of the river Bille.

== Name ==
The name derives from Bilnawerthere, meaning island in the Bille. A Werder is an island between rivers or other bodies of water, in this case Bille and Elbe/Dove Elbe rivers. Until 1949 Billwerder was also named Billwärder an der Elbe.

== Geography ==
Billwerder borders the quarters of Lohbrügge, Bergedorf, Neuallermöhe, Allermöhe, Moorfleet, Billbrook, and Billstedt.

Billwerder is part of the Marschlande (marshlands) area in Hamburg, which is known for its wet and muddy grounds. It is sparsely populated. Billwerder's landscape is formed by the transition of rural Vierlande into the industrial and commercial areas near the Port of Hamburg, such as nearby Billbrook. Billwerder is largely characterized by horticulture and agriculture, on the other hand, however, commercial environments, the Federal Highway 1, and the Hamburg-Bergedorf railway line, the first railway line in Northern Germany, are also part of the quarter.

In 2017 the city of Hamburg started planning the new quarter Oberbillwerder which is located at the Allermöhe station.

== Politics ==
These are the results of Billwerder in the Hamburg state election:

Election	SPD	CDU	AfD	Left	Greens	FDP	Others
2020	25,9 %	25,8 %	12,8 %	12,0 %	9,6 %	2,6 %	11,3 %
2015	55,5 %	10,3 %	8,7 %	9,1 %	7,2 %	5,6 %	3,6 %
2011	52,6 %	22,9 %	–	5,8 %	8,6 %	5,6 %	4,5 %
2008	32,6 %	43,5 %	–	7,8 %	8,0 %	5,2 %	2,9 %

== Transportation ==
The S-Bahn stations of Billwerder-Moorfleet and Mittlerer Landweg are located in the quarter.
