= Tiefstack station =

Railway station in Hamburg, Germany

Tiefstack
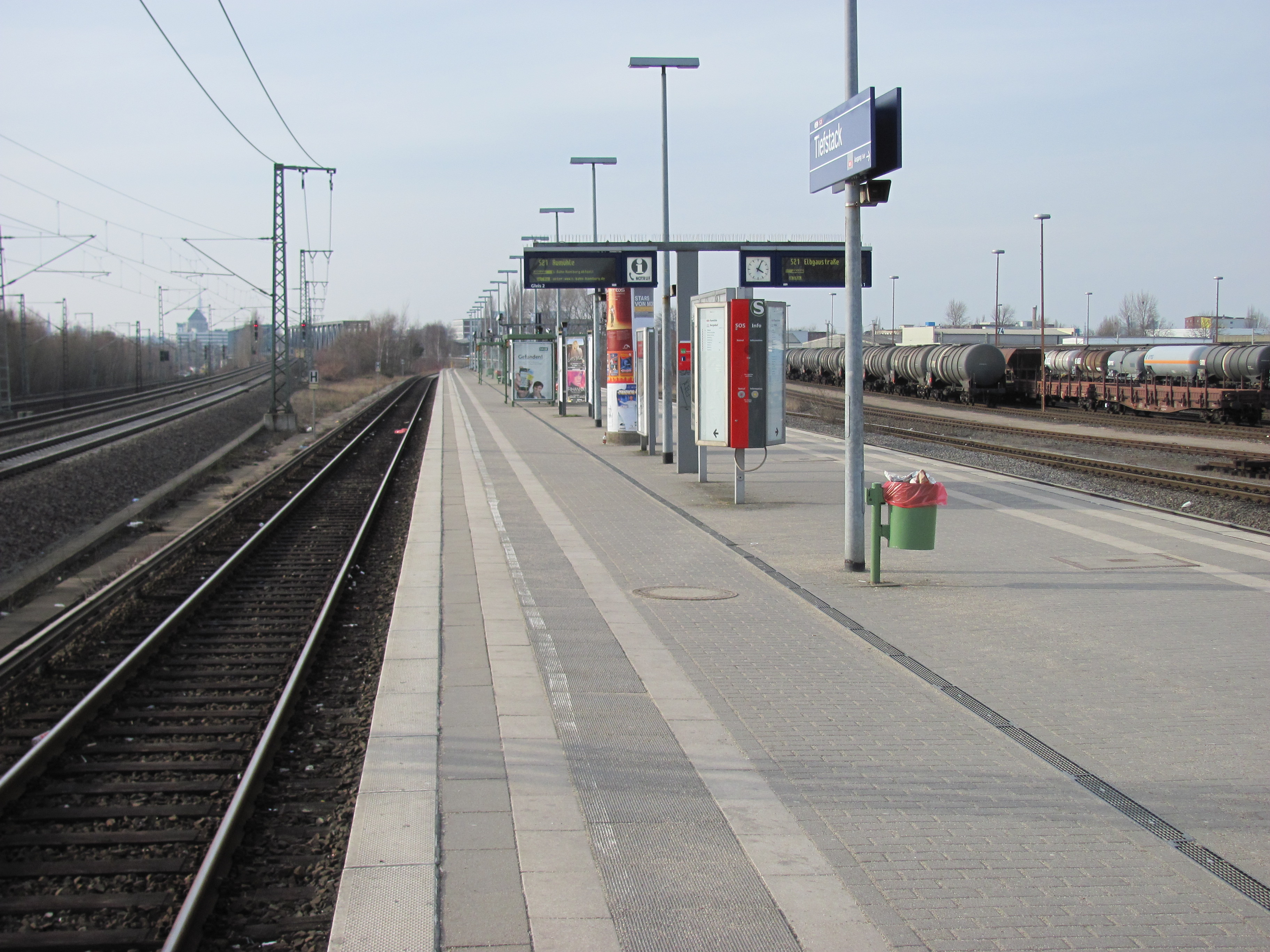

General information
- Location: Ausschläger Allee 140; 20539 Hamburg; Germany
- Coordinates: 53°31′52″N 10°03′57″E
- Operator: S-Bahn Hamburg GmbH
- Line: S2
- Platforms: 1 island platform
- Tracks: 2
- Connections: Bus

Construction
- Structure type: At grade

Other information
- Station code: ds100: ATK; DB: 6215
- Fare zone: HVV: A/106 and 206

History
- Opened: 7 May 1842; 184 years ago
- Electrified: 1 June 1958; 68 years ago

Services
Preceding station	Hamburg S-Bahn	Following station
Rothenburgsort towards Hamburg-Altona	S2	Billwerder-Moorfleet towards Aumühle
Location
- Location within Hamburg Location within Schleswig-Holstein Location within Germany Location within Europe

Tiefstack is a station on the Berlin-Hamburg railway line and served by the trains of Hamburg S-Bahn line S2. The station was originally opened in 1842 and is located in the Hamburg district of Rothenburgsort, Germany. Rothenburgsort is part of the borough of Hamburg-Mitte.

== History ==
The station was originally opened by the Hamburg-Bergedorf Railway Company in 1842 to serve the commuter rail in Hamburg's south-eastern quarters. In 1958 Tiefstack station was electrified and integrated into the Hamburg S-Bahn network.

== Service ==
The line S2 of Hamburg S-Bahn call at Tiefstack station.

== See also ==
- Hamburger Verkehrsverbund (HVV)
- List of Hamburg S-Bahn stations
