= DB Class 472 =

Deutsche Bundesbahn Baureihe 472/473
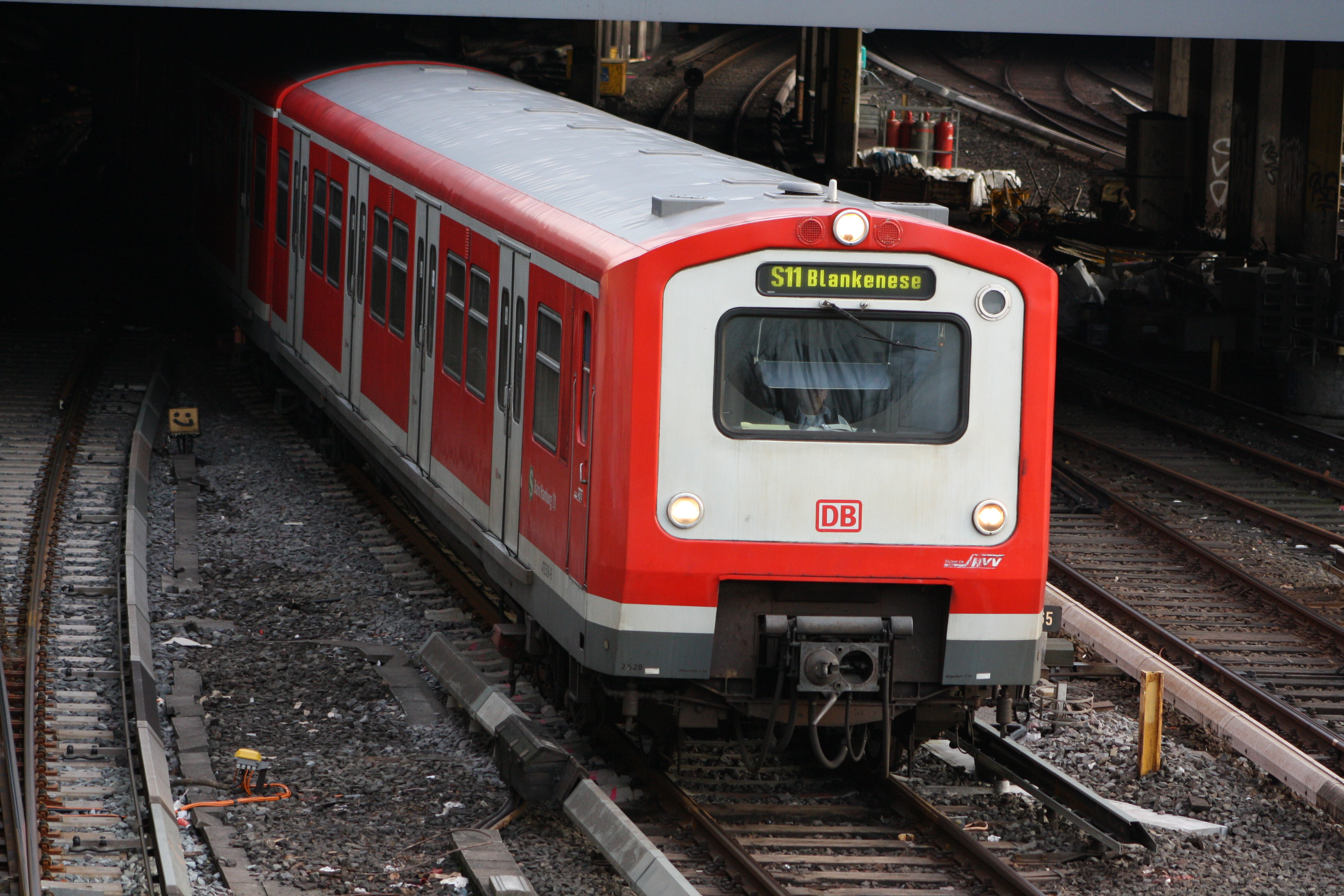
- DB Class 472 leaving Hamburg central station
Type and origin
- Power type: Electric
- Builder: LHB, MBB, WMD, SSD,
- Build date: 1974-1975; 1983-1984
- Total produced: 62
Specifications
- Configuration
  - UIC: Bo′Bo′+Bo′Bo′+Bo′Bo′
- Gauge: 1,435 mm (4 ft 8 1/2 in) standard gauge
- Length: 65.820 m (215 ft 11 5/16 in)
- Loco weight: 114.4 t (112.6 long tons; 126.1 short tons)
- Electric system/s: 1200 V DC Third rail
- Current pickup(s): Bottom contact Contact shoe
- Train brakes: Air, electric
- Safety systems: Sifa, PZB
Performance figures
- Maximum speed: 100 km/h (62 mph)
- Power output: 1,520 kW (2,040 hp)
Career
- Operators: Deutsche Bundesbahn; Deutsche Bahn AG; Hamburg S-Bahn
- Class: 472/473

The DB Class 472/473 is a three-car electric multiple unit train for the Hamburg S-Bahn. They were built to service the new lines through the city tunnel (opened 1975), to Harburg (opened 1983) and to Neugraben (opened 1984). The livery was beige blue at first, but it was changed to verkehrsrot (traffic-red) in 1997. The Class 473 is the centre carriage of the Class 472, it differs from the predecessor (470 and 471) centre carriages in its own electric motors and they have three door pairs instead of four.

In 2012, 52 units survived from a total of 62 built. Replacement units are on order as part of the January 2012 tendering of the S-Bahn network, due to run from 2018 until 2033. The last remaining trains were retired on 4 March 2022 with a last round-trip through the S-Bahn-system of Hamburg, one very last service of one train was noticed on 14 March 2022.

The youngest train of the generation has been chosen to be kept as a museum train. It will be re-designed and -painted to the original look which it had when it was brought into service in 1984.
