= Rothenburgsort station =

Railway station in Hamburg, Germany

Rothenburgsort
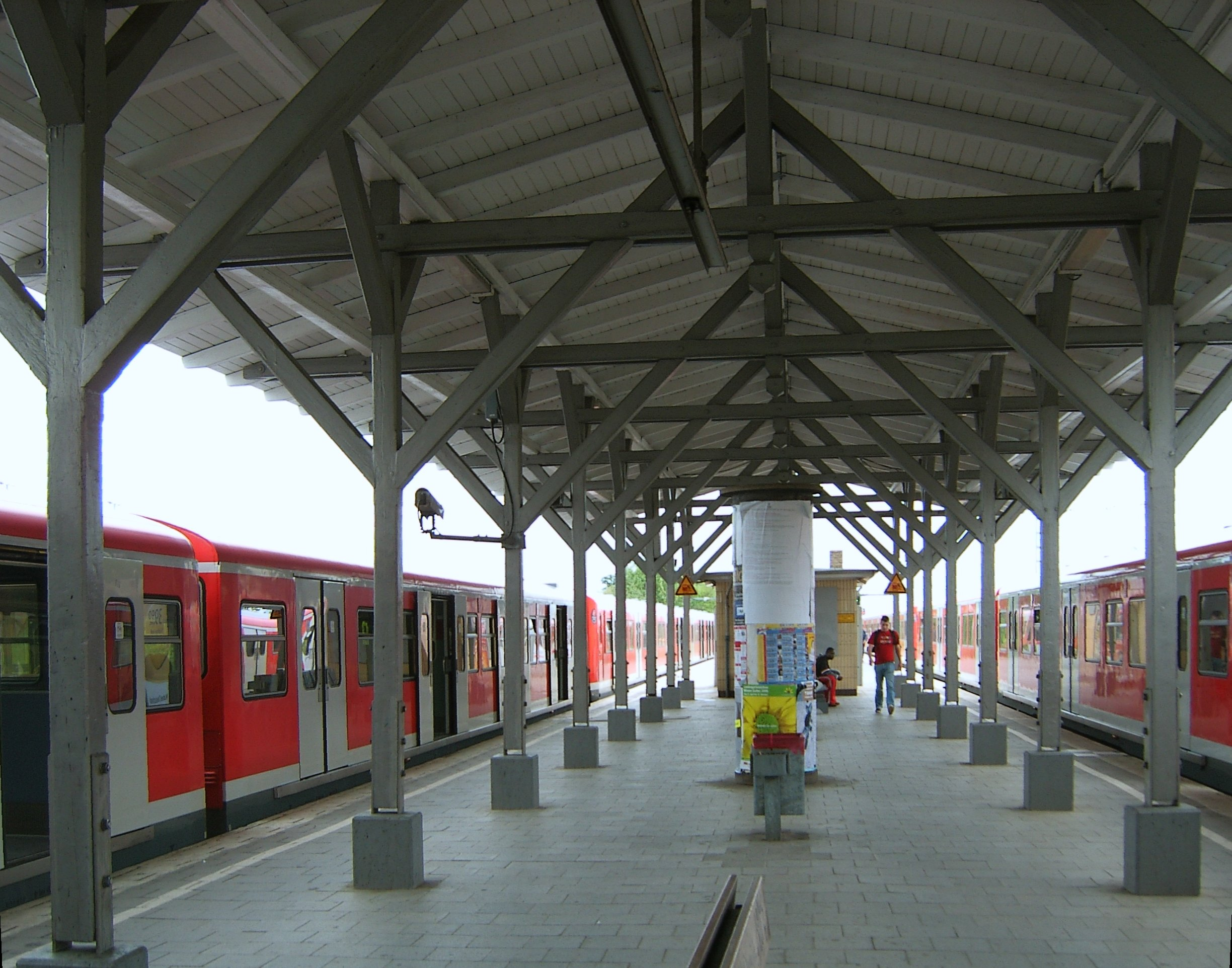

General information
- Location: Billhorner Deich 77; 20539 Hamburg; Germany
- Coordinates: 53°32′19″N 10°02′36″E
- Operator: S-Bahn Hamburg GmbH
- Line: S2
- Platforms: 1 island platform
- Tracks: 2
- Connections: Bus

Construction
- Structure type: Elevated

Other information
- Station code: ds100: AROP; DB: 5394
- Fare zone: HVV: A/106

History
- Opened: 1 May 1907; 119 years ago 27 July 1915
- Closed: 27 July 1943; 83 years ago
- Electrified: at opening 1 June 1958; 68 years ago

Services
Preceding station	Hamburg S-Bahn	Following station
Berliner Tor towards Hamburg-Altona	S2	Tiefstack towards Aumühle
Location
- Location within Hamburg Location within Schleswig-Holstein Location within Germany Location within Europe

Rothenburgsort is a S-Bahn and former U-Bahn station on the Berlin-Hamburg railway line and served by the trains of Hamburg S-Bahn line S2. The station was opened in 1907 and is located in the Hamburg district of Rothenburgsort, Germany. Rothenburgsort is part of the borough of Hamburg-Mitte.

== History ==
The station was opened in 1907 to serve the commuter rail in Hamburg's south-eastern quarters. In 1958 Rothenburgsort station was electrified and integrated into the Hamburg S-Bahn network.

From 1915 until 1943, Rothenburgsort also served as the terminus of a Hochbahn (metro) branch with its tracks and platform located directly to the north of the S-Bahn premises. The metro line was destroyed during World War II and never rebuilt.

== Station layout ==
Rothenburgsort station is located on the eastern side of Billhorner Deich, the elevated rail tracks cross the street on an iron bridge. The only entrance to the one island platform is located at this bridge. The station is going to be reconstructed until December 2022, including new bridges over Billhorner Deich. The historical charm will be refurbished, but be brought to the 21st century, including an elevator and a convenience store on platform.

== Service ==
The line S2 of Hamburg S-Bahn call at Rothenburgsort station.

== Gallery ==
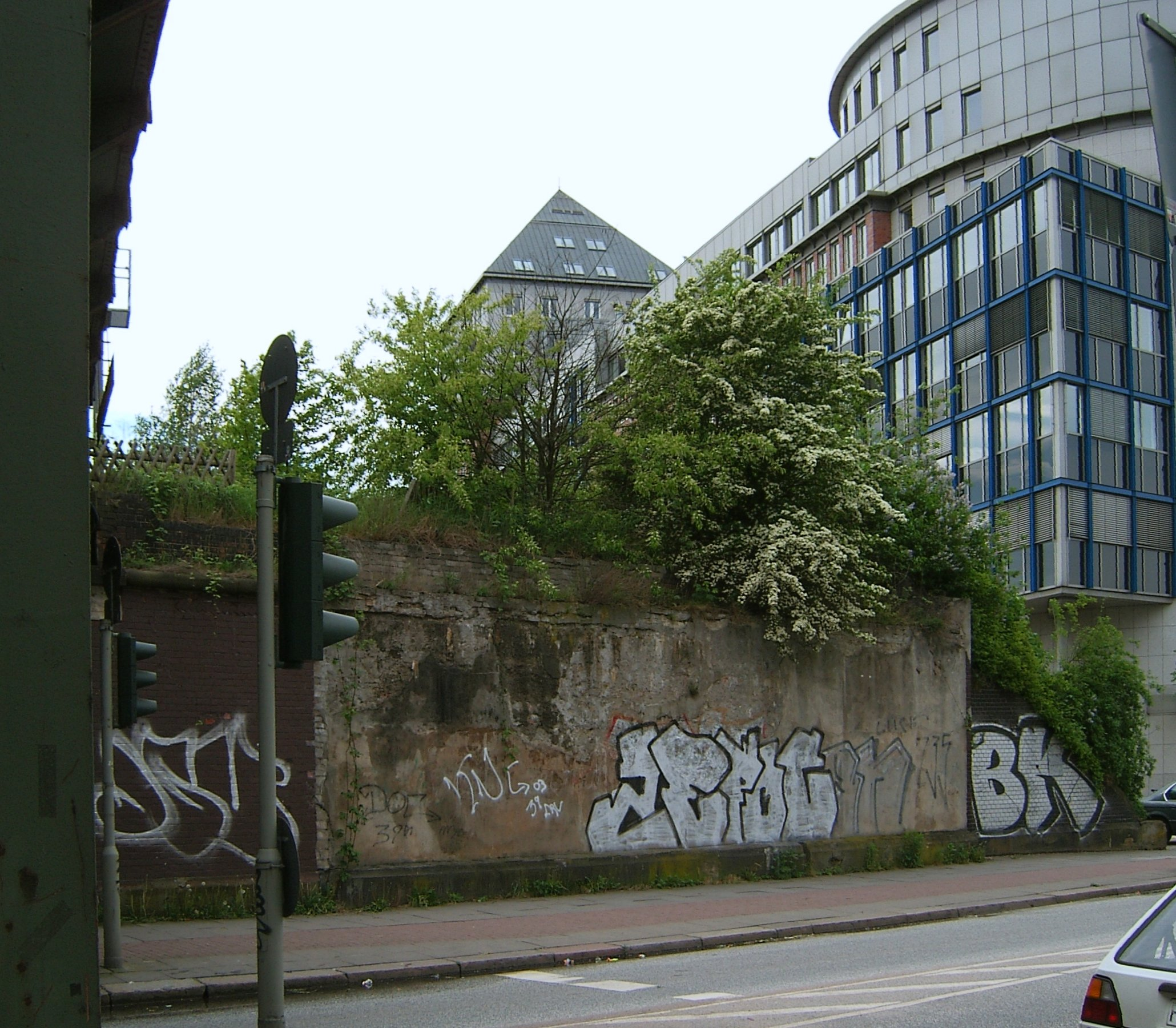
The socle level of the former U-Bahn station next to the remaining S-Bahn station

== See also ==
- Hamburger Verkehrsverbund (HVV)
- List of Hamburg S-Bahn stations
