= Mittlerer Landweg station =

Railway station in Hamburg, Germany

Mittlerer Landweg
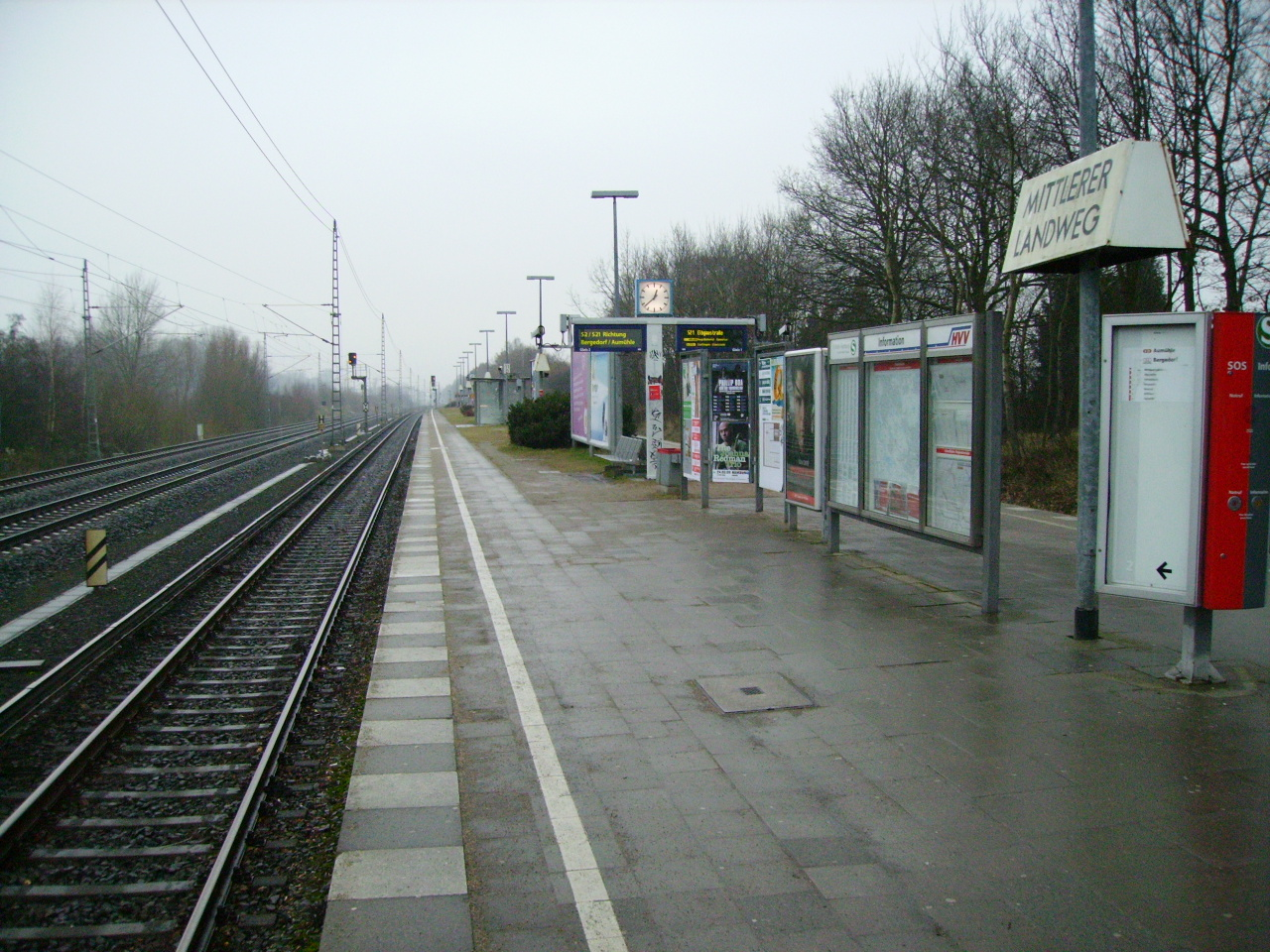

General information
- Location: Mittlerer Landweg 63; 21033 Hamburg; Germany
- Coordinates: 53°29′52″N 10°07′54″E
- Operator: S-Bahn Hamburg GmbH
- Line: S2
- Platforms: 1 island platform
- Tracks: 2
- Connections: Bus

Construction
- Structure type: At grade
- Parking: Park and Ride (90 slots)

Other information
- Station code: ds100: AML; DB: 4139
- Fare zone: HVV: B/306, 307, 406, and 407

History
- Opened: 7 May 1842; 184 years ago
- Electrified: 1 June 1958; 68 years ago

Services
Preceding station	Hamburg S-Bahn	Following station
Billwerder-Moorfleet towards Hamburg-Altona	S2	Allermöhe towards Aumühle
Location
- Location within Hamburg Location within Schleswig-Holstein Location within Germany Location within Europe

Mittlerer Landweg is a station on the Berlin-Hamburg railway line and served by the trains of Hamburg S-Bahn line S2. The station was originally opened in 1842 and is located in the Hamburg district of Billwerder, Germany. Billwerder is part of the Hamburg borough of Bergedorf.

== History ==
The station was opened by the Hamburg-Bergedorf Railway Company in 1842 to serve the commuter rail in Hamburg's south-eastern quarters. In 1958 Mittlerer Landweg station was electrified and integrated into the Hamburg S-Bahn network.

== Service ==
The line S2 of Hamburg S-Bahn call at Mittlerer Landweg station. The travel time to Hamburg Hauptbahnhof is about 14 minutes.

== See also ==
- Hamburger Verkehrsverbund (HVV)
- List of Hamburg S-Bahn stations
