= Billwerder-Moorfleet station =

Railway station in Hamburg, Germany

Billwerder-Moorfleet
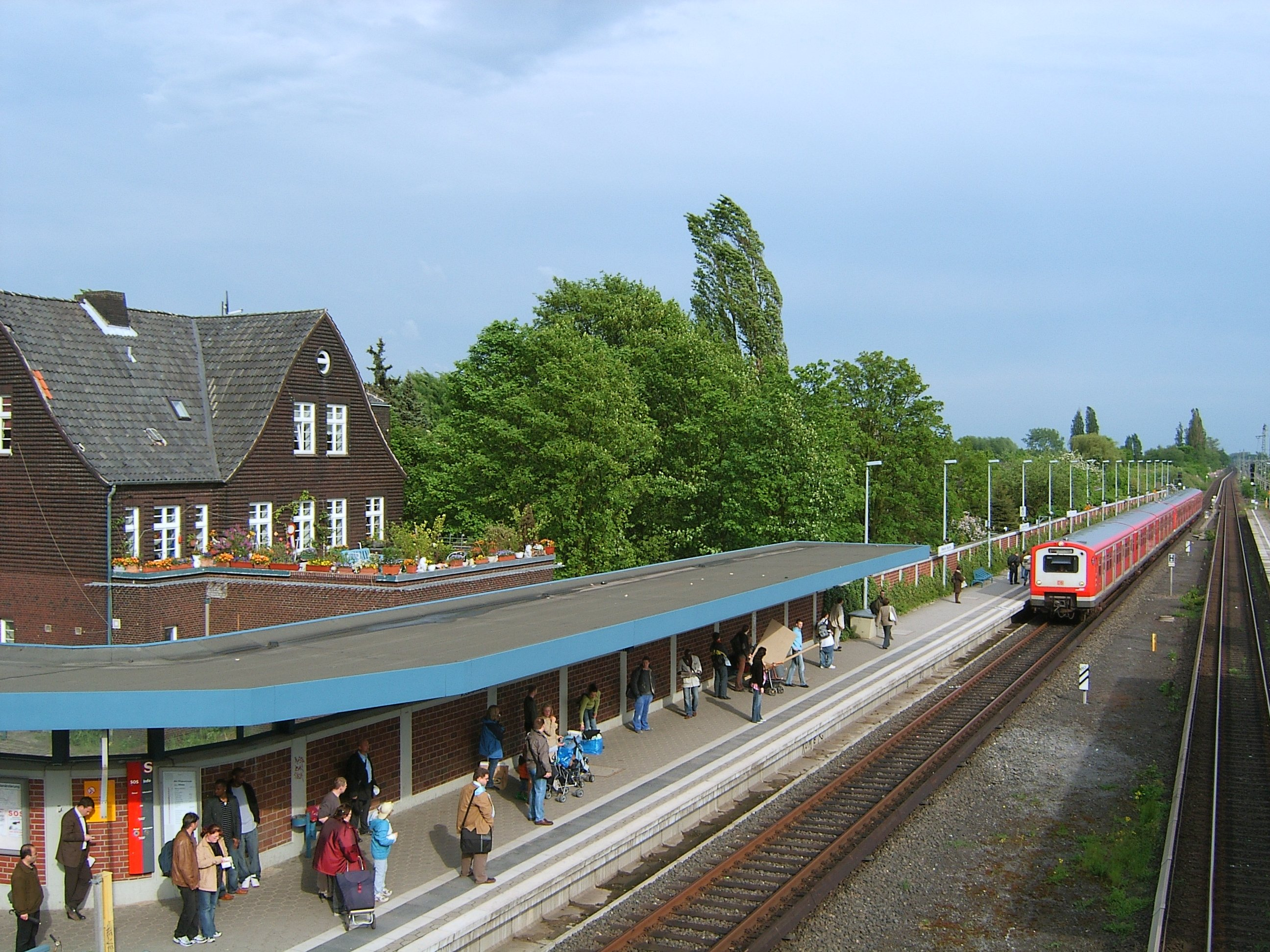

General information
- Location: Alter Landweg 44; 22113 Hamburg, Germany
- Coordinates: 53°30′57″N 10°05′47″E
- System: Hamburg S-Bahn station
- Operator: S-Bahn Hamburg GmbH
- Line: S2
- Platforms: 2 side platforms
- Tracks: 2
- Connections: Bus

Construction
- Structure type: At grade

Other information
- Station code: ds100: ABWM; DB: 644
- Fare zone: HVV: A and B/206, 306, and 307

History
- Opened: 7 May 1842; 184 years ago
- Electrified: 1 June 1958; 68 years ago

Services
Preceding station	Hamburg S-Bahn	Following station
Tiefstack towards Hamburg-Altona	S2	Mittlerer Landweg towards Aumühle
Location
- Location within Hamburg Location within Schleswig-Holstein Location within Germany Location within Europe

Billwerder-Moorfleet is a station on the Berlin-Hamburg railway line and served by the trains of Hamburg S-Bahn line S2. The station was originally opened in 1842 and is located in the Hamburg district of Billwerder, Germany. Billwerder is part of the Hamburg borough of Bergedorf.

== History ==
The station was opened by the Hamburg-Bergedorf Railway Company in 1842 to serve the commuter rail in Hamburg's south-eastern quarters. On 1 June 1958 Billwerder-Moorfleet station was electrified and integrated into the Hamburg S-Bahn network.

Before the Berlin-Hamburg railway was re-built at the beginning of the 1990s, the station had an island platform. One side of it was cut off, because the space was needed for the railway line and a new container terminal, and the rest was changed into a side platform. On the other side of the S-Bahn track, in front of the station building, a new side platform was built as a replacement, so today the station has two side platforms. Also there was a signal box, which was demolished along with the island platform.

== Station layout ==
Billwerder-Moorfleet is an at-level station with 2 side platforms and 2 tracks. The station is unstaffed but an SOS and information telephone is available. There are some places to lock a bicycle and some parking spots. Only the platform in Hamburg city direction is fully accessible for handicapped persons, as there is no lift at the footbridge leading to the platform in Bergedorf direction. There are no lockers.

== Service ==
The line S2 of Hamburg S-Bahn call at Billwerder-Moorfleet station. Also the bus line 230 stops here.

== See also ==
- Hamburger Verkehrsverbund (HVV)
- List of Hamburg S-Bahn stations
