= Hamburg S-Bahn =

Suburban commuter railway network in Germany

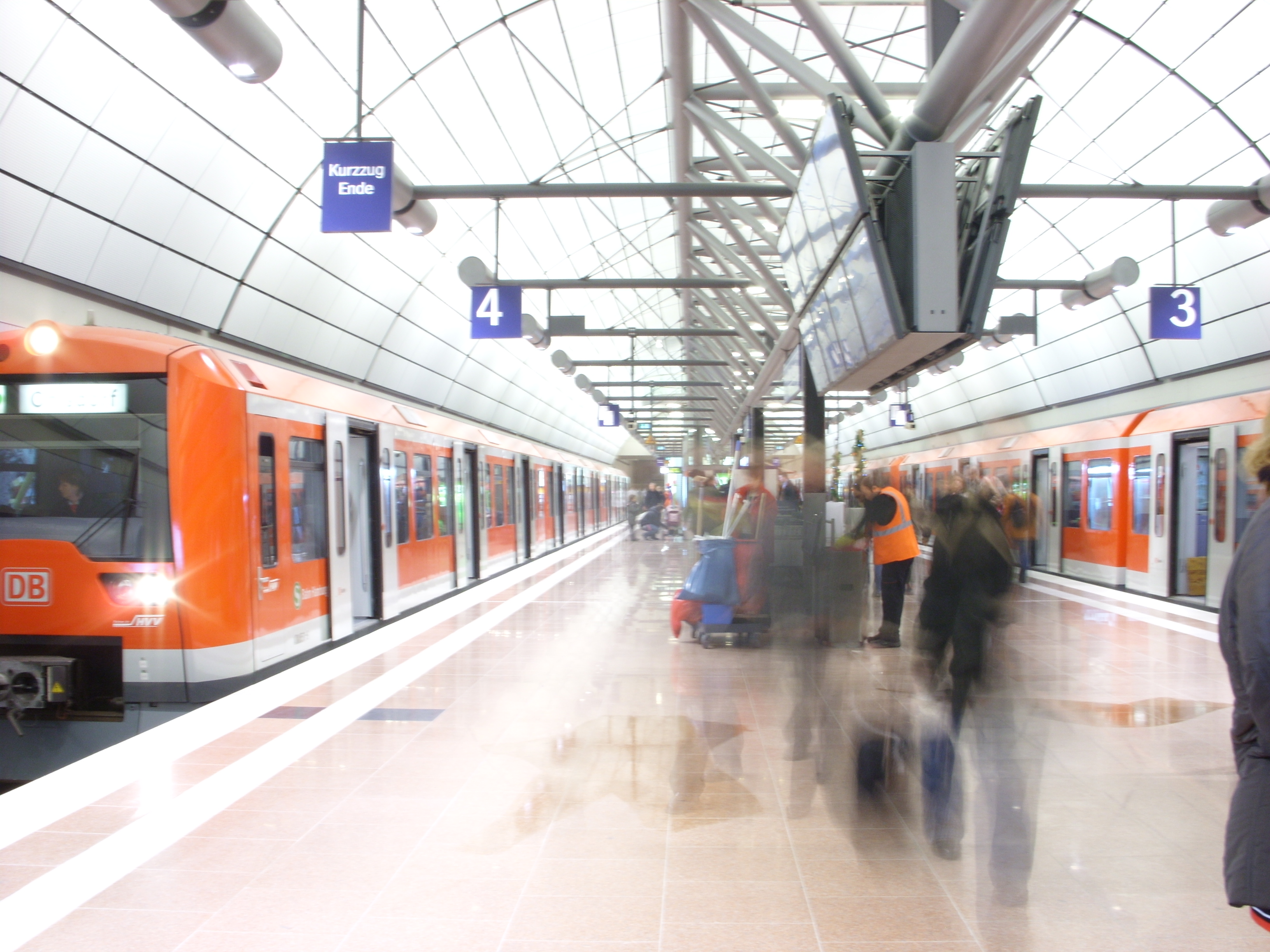
- S-Bahn-Station "Hamburg Airport (Flughafen)"

Overview
- Locale: Hamburg
- Transit type: S-trains, Commuter rail
- Number of lines: 5 (S Bahn Lines)
- Number of stations: 68 (11 underground & 4 DB)
- Annual ridership: 227,000,000 (2016)
- Website: S-Bahn Hamburg

Operation
- Began operation: 1906
- Operator: S-Bahn Hamburg GmbH

Technical
- System length: 147 km (91 mi)
- Track gauge: 1,435 mm (4 ft 8 1/2 in) standard gauge
- Electrification: 1,200 V DC third rail, 15 kV 16 2/3 Hz AC overhead lines for the extension to Stade
System map

The Hamburg S-Bahn is a rapid transit system in the Hamburg Metropolitan Region. Together, the S-Bahn, the Hamburg U-Bahn, the AKN railway and the regional railway form the backbone of railway public transport in the city and the surrounding area. The network has operated since 1907 as a commuter rail system, under the direction of the state railway, and is a member of the Hamburger Verkehrsverbund (HVV; Hamburg Transport Association). There are four lines, serving 68 stations, on 147 kilometres (91 mi) of route. On an average working day the S-Bahn transports about 590,000 passengers; in 2010 about 221 million people used the S-Bahn.

The S-Bahn is the only railway in Germany that uses both 1,200 V DC supplied by a third rail and 15 kV 16 2/3 Hz AC supplied by overhead lines. Sections of track electrified by third rail are separated from other traffic. On the Neugraben - Stade portion, the S-Bahn runs on mainline tracks in mixed traffic. The S-Bahn is operated by S-Bahn Hamburg GmbH, a subsidiary of DB Regio.

Similarly to Berlin but unlike Hanover, the S-Bahn is an important part of public transport within the city due to its dense schedule and good coverage of the metropolitan region. Unlike both Berlin and Hanover, the S-Bahn is of little importance for regional traffic since the network lies mostly within the city, though in 2007 the southwestern S3 line was extended about 32 km (20 mi) into the state of Lower Saxony (the Neugraben - Stade portion, which included seven stations).

== History ==
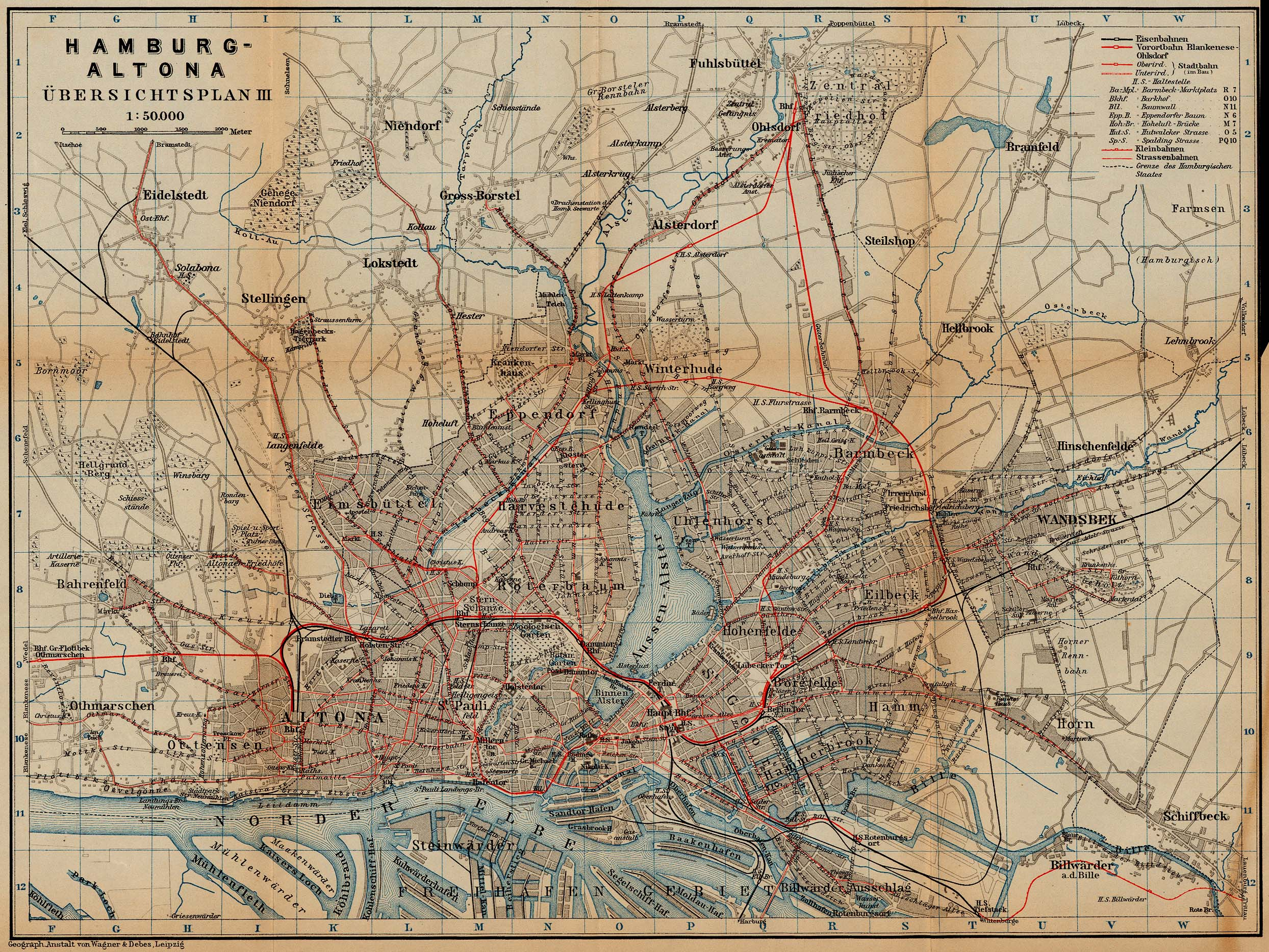
Railway and tramway map of Hamburg and Altona, about 1910.

=== 1906: Opening ===
On 5 December 1906, under the description Hamburg-Altonaer Stadt- und Vorortbahn, the Prussian Eisenbahndirektion (railway division) of Altona opened with steam trains between Blankenese, Altona (Elbe) and Hamburg.

The Stadt- und Vorortbahn (City and Suburban railway) included the Altona-Blankenese line (Altona-Blankeneser Bahn, opened in 1867), the local tracks of the Hamburg-Altona link line (Verbindungsbahn, opened in 1866) and a new section to Ohlsdorf.

The Verbindungsbahn had been extended from one track to four and level crossings eliminated between 1893 and 1903. The new double-track line adjoining it was completed in the summer of 1906 after an eight-year construction period. It ran alongside the Lübeck–Hamburg line of the Lübeck-Büchen Railway Company as far as Hasselbrook and then on its own tracks as far as the new Ohlsdorf cemetery. A new main cemetery with good transit connections was necessary in part due to the extension of the central railway lines, which had reduced the area of the existing already strained cemeteries near the city's medieval fortifications.

=== 1907: First electric operation ===
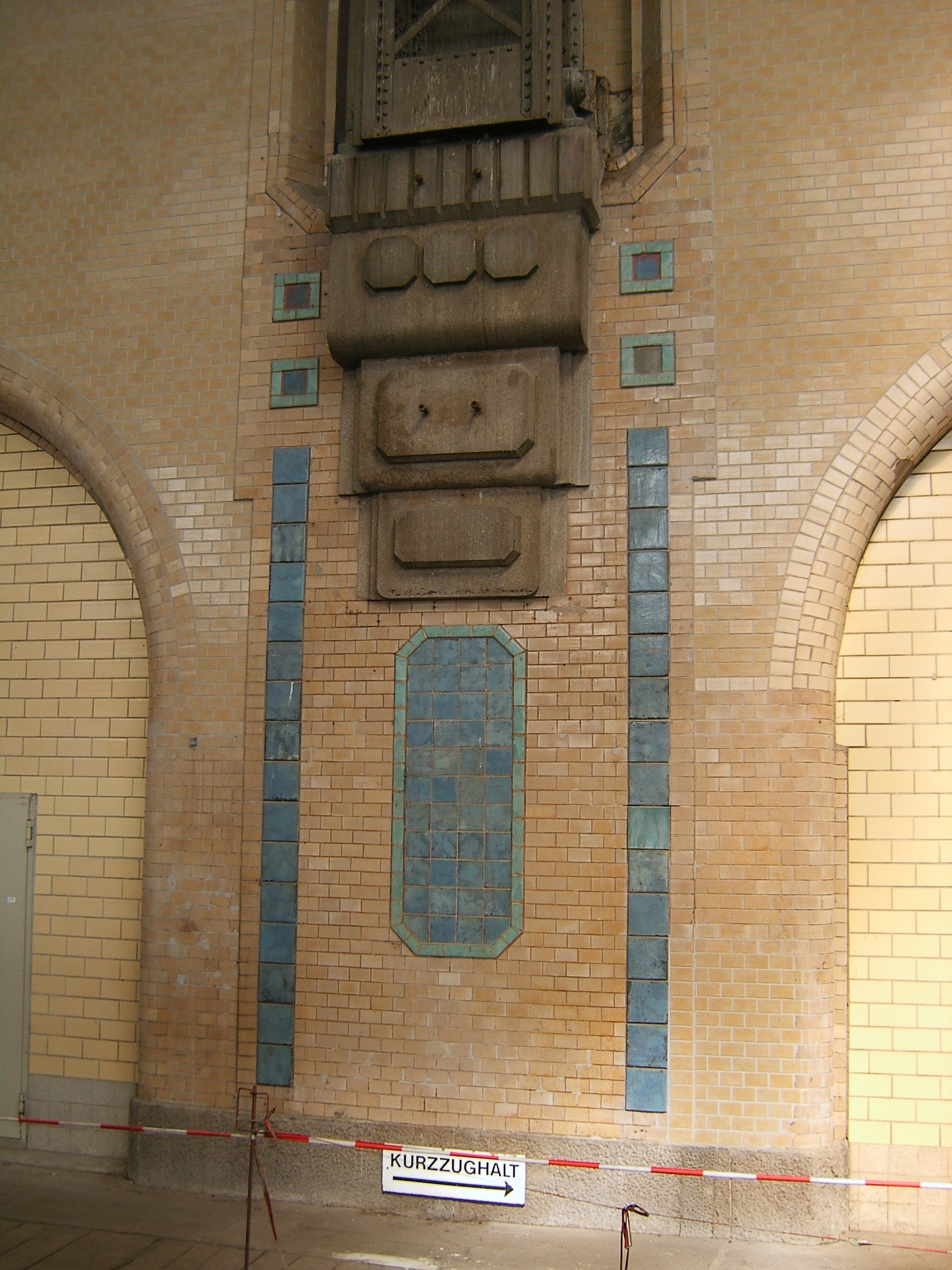
Detail of part of a wall in Hamburg Hauptbahnhof: bolts used to attach a mast for the overhead power lines.

The line was electrified with overhead lines supplying 6,600 V alternating current at 25 Hz. The electricity came from a coal-fired power station in Leverkusenstraße in Bahrenfeld, which also provided power to the Altona harbour railway.

The first electric trains ran on 1 October 1907, and from 29 January 1908 the line from Blankenese to Ohlsdorf was served exclusively by electric trains. These dates are considered the birthdates of the S-Bahn.

The basic unit of an AC train consisted of two articulated compartment carriages on six axles with motorised two-axle bogies under each cab end and a Jacobs bogie in the middle. The carriages, with doors on each side of the compartments, took their design and functionality from Prussian compartment carriages.

=== 1924: Network expansion along the Alster valley railway ===
A railway line constructed and operated by a local company in 1914 and taken over by the district of Stormarn after bankruptcy, led from Ohlsdorf to Poppenbüttel in Prussia, with the goal of connecting neighbouring settlements along the Alster river. It was known as the Alster Valley Railway. It opened in 1918 with petrol-powered trains. The district of Stormarn gave the line to the German Imperial railway company, which electrified it and provided the extension of the Hamburg-Altona City and Suburban railway to Poppenbüttel in 1924.

=== 1934: Designation as an S-Bahn ===
The term S-Bahn was first coined and used in Berlin from 1930, where a similar system on the City, Ring and Suburban lines had been operated since 1924; it was first used by the German Imperial railway with reference to its Hamburg-Altona City and Suburban railway in 1934. The term was also used to describe non-electric services on lines within the local suburban tariff: the steam-powered lines from Blankenese to Wedel, from Altona to Elmshorn, from Hamburg to Friedrichsruh and to Harburg. Since 2002, lines not served by S-Bahn have been designated "Regional railway lines".

=== 1939/40: Moving to the DC system ===
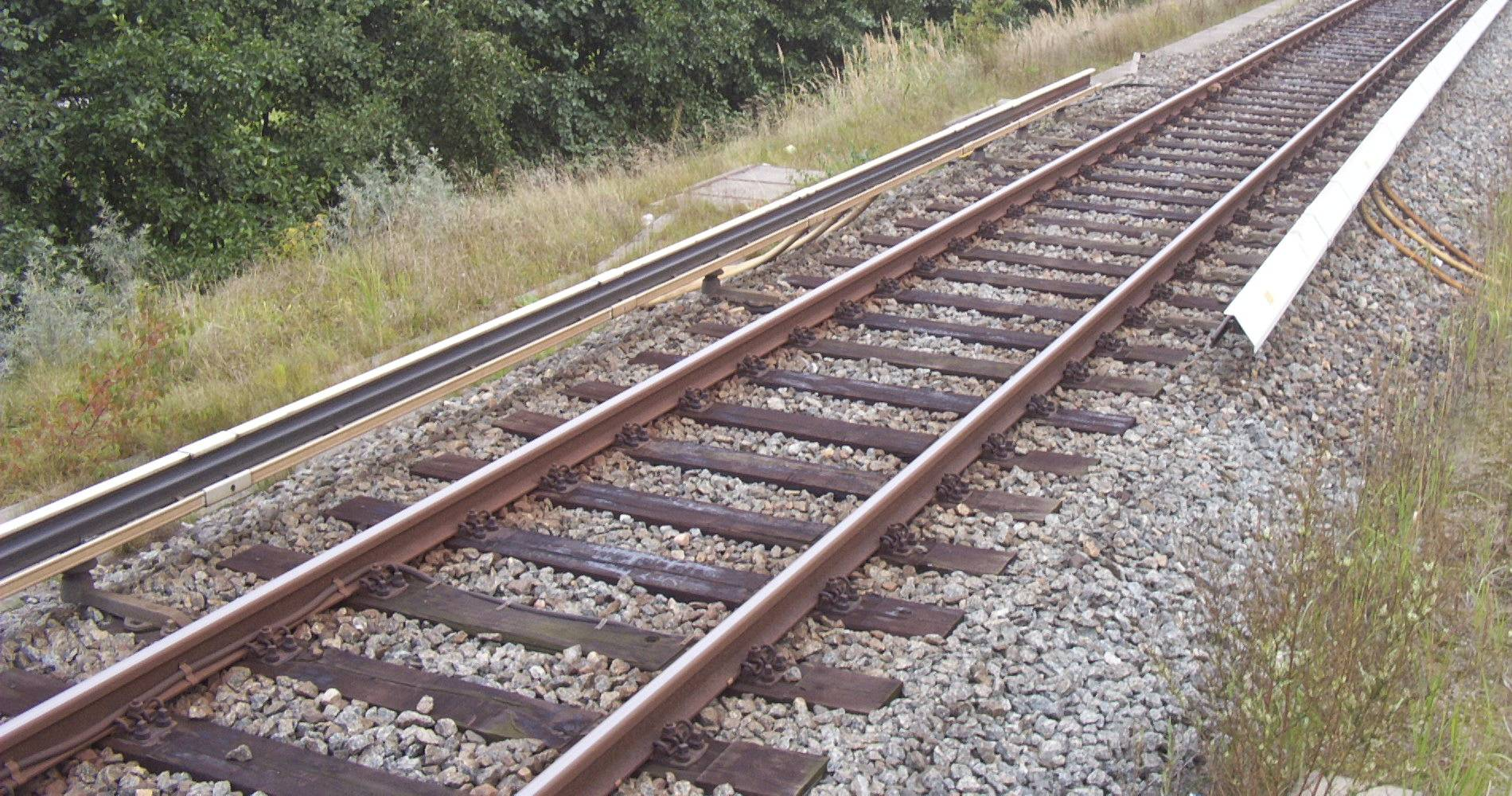
Third rail on the Hamburg S-Bahn, here with a plastic cover

In the 1930s, after almost 30 years of service, the necessity to renew the trains and infrastructure had become apparent. Since the DC system had proved itself over more than a decade with the Berlin S-Bahn, where the 750 volt DC power was supplied by a third rail, the German Imperial Railway decided to adopt the same system for Hamburg in 1937 and to abandon overhead AC. In order to allow improved acceleration, the S-Bahn uses 1200 volts: as a consequence, Berlin and Hamburg rolling stock are not compatible with each other. The first DC trains, of the type ET 171, were delivered in 1939; daily service began in July 1940 alongside the AC trains. Due to the Second World War and the post-war years with their shortages, mixed usage lasted until 1955.

The basic DC train unit consisted of three four-axle carriages, each with four sliding double doors per side. The middle carriages had upholstered seats for second class, while the motorised end carriages had third-class wooden seats.

=== Network extensions from 1950 to 1965 ===
The DC S-Bahn was extended along the single-track suburban line from Blankenese to Sülldorf in 1950 and to Wedel in 1954. A section of the mainline railway between Hamburg and Berlin, which, due to the division of Germany, had very little traffic, between Haupbahnhof and Bergedorf was added to the network in 1959 by the addition of the third rail. This was the first section where S-Bahn and mainline trains (the number of the latter remained small until 1990) shared tracks. It was the second S-Bahn line, from Bergedorf via Berliner Tor to Altona. In 1962 a connecting curve was constructed from the Verbindungsbahn at Holstenstraße to the Altona-Kaltenkirchen railway (AKN), whose terminus was relocated to Langenfelde. The S-Bahn was extended in 1965 along the AKN to Eidelstedt and from there along the mainline tracks towards Kiel as far as Elbgaustraße.

=== HVV and a line numbering system ===
In 1965, the German Railway, along with two local transport companies, founded the Hamburger Verkehrsverbund (HVV), a common tariff system for U-Bahn, bus lines, and harbour ferries. The S-Bahn joined in December 1966. From January 1967, the S-Bahn lines were designated S1−S6 (see Network). Line designations with a leading letter "S" have since been adopted for other S-Bahn systems in the German-speaking world. Analogically, U-Bahn lines got the leading letter "U".

=== Network extension after 1967 ===
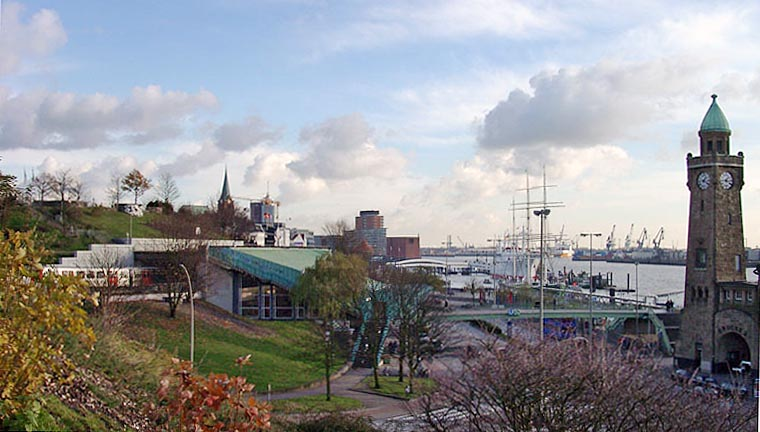
S- & U-Bahn Station Landungsbrücken (left)

Extensions were made in 1967 on separate tracks from Elbgaustraße to Pinneberg, and in 1969 on existing mainline tracks from Bergedorf to Aumühle.

To ease the strain on the central Verbindungsbahn ("connection railway"), a second main connection was constructed, the City S-Bahn, which traverses the city centre in a tunnel. The first section was opened in 1975 between Hauptbahnhof and Landungsbrücken, the extension to Altona in 1979 and was completed in 1981 with the connection above ground to Diebsteich. 1983 saw the opening of the line via Wilhelmsburg to Harburg Rathaus, a long stretch of which runs along the existing mainline. Through Hammerbrook the trains run on a concrete viaduct and in a tunnel under the centre of Harburg. The line was extended in 1984 along the Niederelbebahn to Neugraben.

The line to Bergedorf was placed on separate tracks due to increased traffic on the main line during the 1990s as a result of German reunification. For the same reason, S-Bahn service between Bergedorf and Aumühle was suspended in 1994. The section to Reinbek was reopened in 1997; completion to Aumühle was delayed until 2002 due to court challenges from local residents. In 1999, Allermöhe station (between Mittlerer Landweg and Nettelnburg) opened in the new housing development of Neuallermöhe-West.

Since December 2007, the S3 has served stations between Neugraben and Stade.

The groundbreaking for a 3.3 km (2.1 mi) long line from Ohlsdorf to the airport took place in 1991, and again in 2001; the line was opened on 11 December 2008 and has been fully operational since 12 December 2008. Northbound S1 trains split at Ohlsdorf, the front section runs to the airport, the rear section continues to Poppenbüttel.

== Operating company ==
The S-Bahn is operated by S-Bahn Hamburg GmbH, a subsidiary of Deutsche Bahn AG. The company is answerable to DB Regio Nord and was formed in 1997.

The S-Bahn is represented in German cities with a logo consisting of a white "S" in a green circle. In Hamburg the same logo with a red background was used for a few years before November 2007.

The company currently employs approximately 1200 personnel in the driving, maintenance, train departure and resource management divisions. Another 300 employees are responsible for security and cleaning, through subsidiaries.

== Lines ==
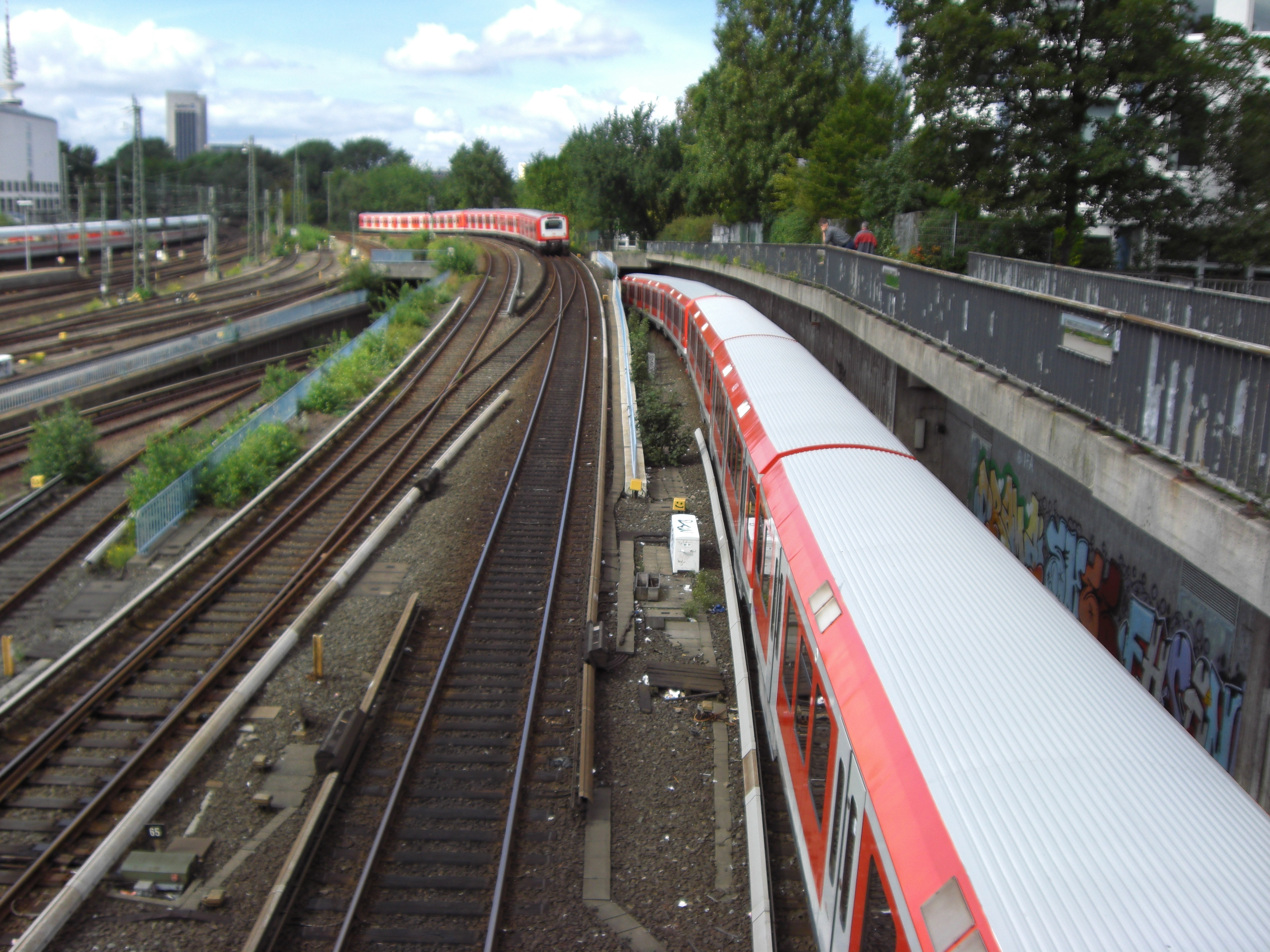
EMUs on the Verbindungsbahn (lefthand side) and on the tunnel ramp of the City S-Bahn (righthand side)

The network covers about 147 kilometres (91 mi), and serves 68 stations. It consists of two trunk routes crossing the city in an east-west direction – the northern Hamburg-Altona link line and the southern City S-Bahn – and six connecting routes (two in the western part of the city and four in the eastern part). The trunk routes connect at Altona and Hauptbahnhof. 113.2 km (70.3 mi) are separated from other rail services, 31.9 km (19.8 mi) are shared with regional and cargo traffic. About 12.5 km (7.8 mi) is in tunnel, 7.9 km (4.9 mi) are single track.

There are five main lines (S1, S2, S3, S5, S7). S1, S3, and westbound S7 trains use the "City-S-Bahn" via Jungfernstieg, S2, S5, and eastbound S7 trains use the Verbindungsbahn via Dammtor.

Until 2002, some Regionalbahn services were given S-Bahn numbers. Locomotive-hauled service between Hauptbahnhof and Ahrensburg was S4 (now RB 81); between Altona and Elmshorn was S5 (now RE 6 and RB 71); and, before the extension of electric services to Aumühle in 1969, the service between Bergedorf and Friedrichsruh was S6 (now RB 11 and RE 1). S3 was used for Regionalbahn services between Hauptbahnhof and Maschen and Neugraben (now RB 31 and RE 5) until the opening of the Harburg S-Bahn in 1983/1984.

(Stations with names bold in the following table offer a turning option)

Line	Start – End	Stations
S1	Wedel – Blankenese – Hamburg Airport / – Poppenbüttel	Wedel; Rissen; Sülldorf; Iserbrook; Blankenese; Hochkamp; Klein Flottbek (Botanischer Garten); Othmarschen; Bahrenfeld; Altona; Königstraße; Reeperbahn; Landungsbrücken; Stadthausbrücke; Jungfernstieg; Hauptbahnhof; Berliner Tor; Landwehr; Hasselbrook; Wandsbeker Chaussee; Friedrichsberg; Barmbek; Alte Wöhr (Stadtpark); Rübenkamp (City Nord); Ohlsdorf; first three cars: Hamburg Airport (Flughafen) / last three cars: Kornweg (Klein Borstel); Hoheneichen; Wellingsbüttel; Poppenbüttel
S2	Altona – Bergedorf (– Aumühle)	Diebsteich; / Altona (nights only); Holstenstraße; Sternschanze; Dammtor; Hauptbahnhof; Berliner Tor; Rothenburgsort; Tiefstack; Billwerder-Moorfleet; Mittlerer Landweg; Allermöhe; Nettelnburg; Bergedorf; Reinbek (weekend nights only); Wohltorf (weekend nights only); Aumühle (weekend nights only)
S3	Pinneberg – Neugraben (– Stade)	Pinneberg; Thesdorf; Halstenbek; Krupunder; Elbgaustraße; Eidelstedt; Stellingen; Langenfelde; Diebsteich; Altona; Königstraße; Reeperbahn; Landungsbrücken; Stadthausbrücke; Jungfernstieg; Hauptbahnhof; Hammerbrook (City Süd); Elbbrücken; Veddel (BallinStadt); Wilhelmsburg; Harburg; Harburg Rathaus; Heimfeld; Neuwiedenthal; Neugraben; Fischbek (weekend nights only); Neu Wulmstorf (weekend nights only); Buxtehude (weekend nights only); Neukloster (weekend nights only); Horneburg (weekend nights only); Dollern (weekend nights only); Agathenburg (weekend nights only); Stade (weekend nights only)
S5	Elbgaustraße (– Berliner Tor) / – Buxtehude – Stade	Elbgaustraße; Eidelstedt; Stellingen; Langenfelde; Diebsteich; Holstenstraße; Sternschanze; Dammtor; Hauptbahnhof; Berliner Tor / Hammerbrook; Elbbrücken; Veddel (BallinStadt); Wilhelmsburg; Harburg; Harburg Rathaus; Heimfeld; Neuwiedenthal; Neugraben; Fischbek; Neu Wulmstorf; Buxtehude; Neukloster; Horneburg; Dollern; Agathenburg; Stade
S7	Altona – Aumühle	Hauptbahnhof; Jungfernstieg; Stadthausbrücke; Landungsbrücken; Reeperbahn; Königstraße; Altona; Holstenstraße; Sternschanze; Dammtor; Stadthausbrücke; Jungfernstieg; Hauptbahnhof; Berliner Tor; Rothenburgsort; Tiefstack; Billwerder-Moorfleet; Mittlerer Landweg; Allermöhe; Nettelnburg; Bergedorf; Reinbek; Wohltorf; Aumühle

== Projected extensions ==
Plans, currently shelved, would have the S-Bahn network dramatically increased. S-Bahn trains would go as far as Kaltenkirchen (the private AKN Eisenbahn currently connects to Kaltenkirchen from Eidelstedt).

=== S4 Hamburg – Bad Oldesloe ===
An expansion plan which is in proposal, is the opening (or reopening) of a line S4. Plans for this have been around since the 1960s. Whilst planning the City S-Bahn and network extensions of the 1960s, the German railway thought of building an S-Bahn line S4. This line will Altona in a north westerly direction towards Itzehoe via Elmshorn, being an express line until Pinneberg. To the east of the city, the trains of the new line would run with the current S1 to Hasselbrook and from there further to the northeast direction via Rahlstedt to Ahrensburg along the existing regional train line.

Only the eastern part of the line from Hauptbahnhof was implemented, as a regional railway line, which was designated a S-Bahn line, since the HVV did not offer travel with regional railways at the time, but wanted its fare system to be valid on the line.

Since September 2000, a popular initiative in Stormarn has been working for the improvement of the S4, today the RB 81. The initiative is currently basing their arguments on a feasibility study which was ordered by S-Bahn Hamburg GmbH in the year 2002, and in principle dusted off the plans from the 1960s. According to the study, the extension involves upgrading the line to proper S-Bahn standards, served by EMUs and the addition of extra stations. The first step would be the improvement of the line as far as Ahrensburg, with a further intended step being the continuation to Bad Oldesloe. Dual-system trains would be necessary for the new line like those used on the extension to Stade. A third rail would be built as far as Wandsbek, from where the trains would use overhead lines.

As of November 2019, those plans are already approved, with the construction of the line scheduled for 2020.

==== Route and Stations ====
The route will be removed from the existing network at the Hasselbrook S and regional train stop and along the Lübeck – Hamburg route via Rahlstedt to Ahrensburg and Bad Oldesloe run. The route corresponds to the course of the regional train line RB 81, which between 1966 and 2002 was already tariffed as an S-Bahn to Ahrensburg and operated under the name S4, but served by locomotive-hauled push-pull trains. For the expansion of the line, a double-track S-Bahn line will be created between Hasselbrook and Ahrensburg, and a single-track S-Bahn line to Gartenholz, then the S-Bahn trains will switch to the long-distance network and cross over this Bad Oldesloe. The new line has a length of around 20 km (12 mi), the total length of the route between Hasselbrook and Bad Oldesloe is 35.9 km (22.3 mi). The route's planning is divided into the four sections Hasselbrook – Luetkensallee, Luetkensallee – state border Hamburg / Schleswig-Holstein, state border – Gartenholz and Gartenholz – Bad Oldesloe. The first three are also the sections that have been or will be individually plan approval. No separate approval procedure is required for the fourth section, as no construction work is planned for it.

In the Hamburg area, the four new stops Wandsbek Rathaus, Bovestraße, Holstenhofweg and Am Pulverhof are being built, the existing regional train station Wandsbek will be replaced by Wandsbek Rathaus and Bovestrasse replaced. In Schleswig-Holstein, the establishment of an additional stopping point near the existing U-Bahn station Ahrensburg West is planned. The platforms of the existing stations will be adjusted in height and length for S-Bahn operations; In Tonndorf, Ahrensburg, Kupfermühle and Bad Oldesloe the existing systems can be raised to the height of 96 cm customary in the S-Bahn network, in Rahlstedt, Gartenholz and Bargteheide this requires a completely new building. In the first step, all platforms will be built with a length of at least 140 m, a later expansion to serve the route with long trains was taken into account in the planning. Furthermore, the existing level crossings with other types of traffic along the route eliminated. For nature conservation reasons, complex structures are sometimes required, such as a wide-span new bridge in the nature reserve Stellmoor-Ahrensburger Tunneltal, which in the context of the planning process leads to delays and more costs resulted.

=== New S-Bahn Network (from the end of 2023) ===
In June 2022, the S-Bahn Hamburg GmbH announced a new network system which will be in effect starting December 2023 on the nationwide schedule switch. The new network also introduced the 5-minute interval waiting times, replacing its original 10-minute intervals on the majority of train lines.

The S1 travels from its original line track of Airport/Poppenbüttel to Blankenese/Wedel and vice versa with the addition of Ottensen S-Bahn station in between Altona and Bahrenfeld.

The S2, however replaces all trains such as S11, S21, and S31 that passes by „Verbindungsbahn“ (via Dammtor, Sternschanze and Holstenstrasse) since the track runs from Aumühle to Altona via Dammtor and back.

The S3 still runs up from Pinneberg, however only ends until Neugraben and vice versa via the Citytunnel. In light of the track shorting for the S3,

The S5 is introduced and runs between Elbgaustraße and Stade vice versa via the Verbindungsbahn, without stop in Altona. The S6 is still being planned but is rumored to extend from Kaltenkirchen to Neugraben via the Citytunnel.

== Rolling stock ==
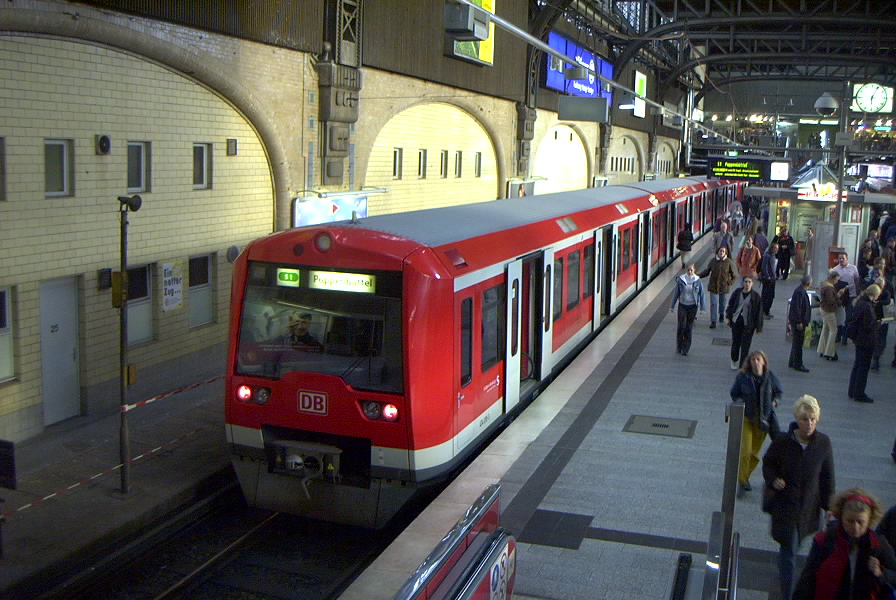
A class 474 train at Hauptbahnhof

The S-Bahn uses three-car electrical multiple units (EMUs), 447 vehicles of the following types:

- Type 470, built from 1959 until 1970, in service until 2002 (central carriage of type 870)
- Type 471, built from 1939 until 1958, in service until 2001 (central carriage of type 871)
- Type 472, built from 1974 until 1984, in service until 2022 (central carriage of type 473)
- Type 474, built from 1996 until 2007 (central carriage of type 874)
- Type 490, built from 2013

Single three-carriage trains are designated short trains. Units can be combined to form a full train with six carriages (2 units) or a long train with nine carriages (3 units).

Until 2001, the S-Bahn was one of very few suburban railway systems to offer two classes of service. A quieter and more comfortable first class was available for a 50% supplement.

Only type 474 and type 490 trains are now in regular service. The last remaining type 470 and type 471 trains were removed from service in 2002 and 2001 respectively and the 472 trains in 2022. The type 474 trains primarily serve lines S1, S2 and S5, type 490 lines S2, S3, S5, and S7.

With the extension of the S-Bahn to Stade, new dual-system trains have been deployed. These are identical to the type 474 units but with a pantograph on the central carriage to collect 15 kV alternate current from overhead lines.

With the introduction of type 474, the colour scheme of ivory and teal was replaced by a colour called "Traffic Red" (RAL 3020). External advertising covering the entire bodies of trains was abandoned at this time. The implementation of a consistent corporate design led to type 472 trains being updated with the new colour scheme. This had left the Berlin S-Bahn as the only German S-Bahn train types with an individual design.

Type 474 trains were initially in the same colour scheme as the than new type DT4 trains of the Hamburg U-Bahn (white, grey, red). This early experiment was quickly given up.

In 2013, 60 trains were ordered from Bombardier for 327 million euros. The trains are being delivered since 2016. These trains were at first, and to a lesser extent still are, notorious for their sensitive doors, making them more prone to delays.

There are three preserved trains, number 170 082 known as a 'museum train' and numbers 470 128 with 471 082 known as 'traditional trains'. These trains were used for different events throughout the year and in particular in the lead up to Christmas.

== Stations ==
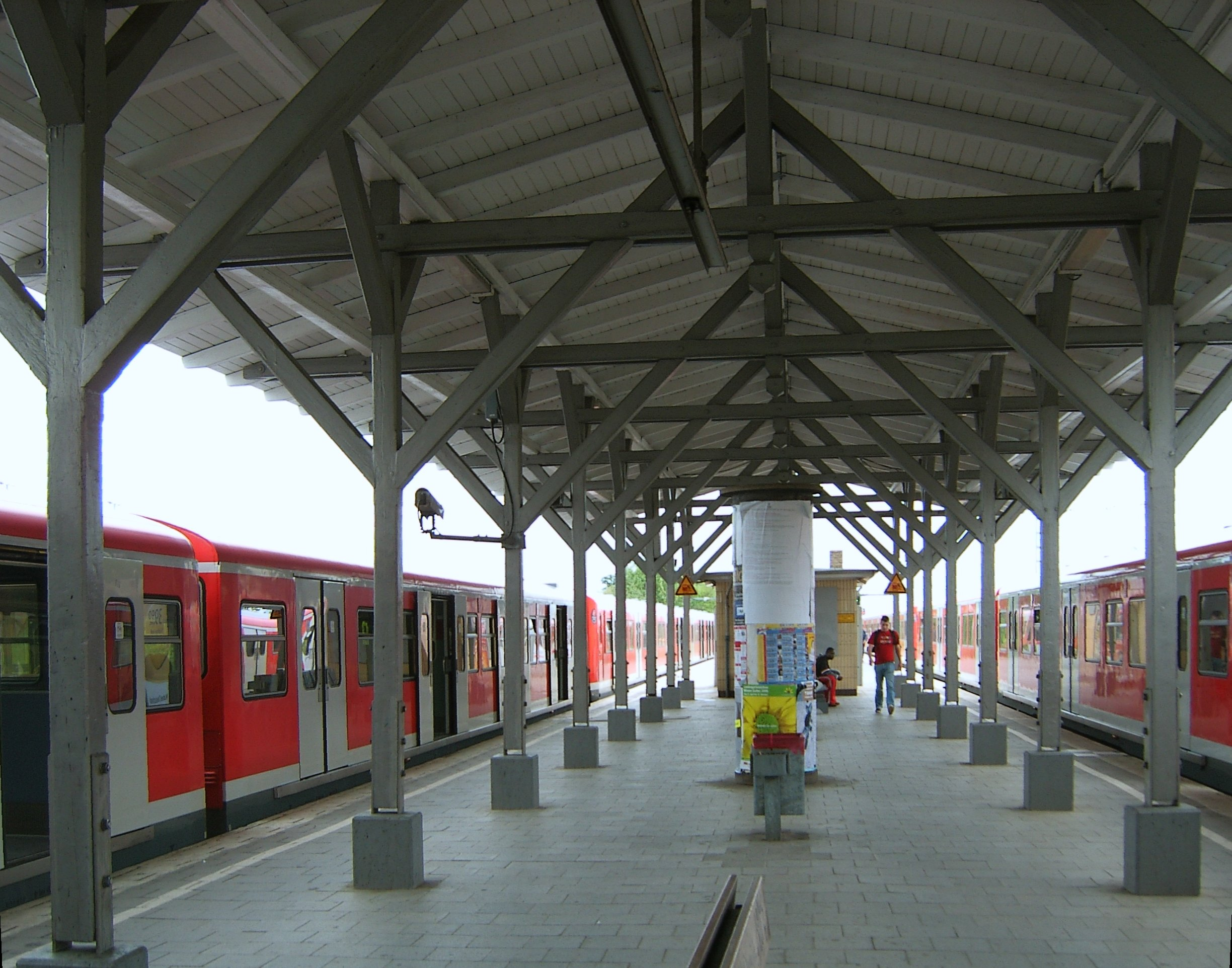
Platform at Rothenburgsort station

The S-Bahn system has 68 stations, of which ten are fully underground. These are the five stations along the City-S-Bahn (Jungfernstieg, Stadthausbrücke, Landungsbrücken, Reeperbahn and Königstraße), the S-Bahn area of Altona station, the three stations in the centre of Harburg (Harburg, Harburg Rathaus and Heimfeld) and at Hamburg Airport. At the Hauptbahnhof, the two track westbound platform is also in tunnel.

Most stations consist of a single island platform. At the interchange stations Hauptbahnhof and Altona there are two island platforms, one for trains to the city centre and one for the other direction. At Neugraben and Pinneberg termini the two S-Bahn tracks are between a side platform and an island platform, on the other side of which regional rail trains stop. Side platforms are at the triple-track stations at Bergedorf, Berliner Tor (lower level), Blankenese and Harburg Rathaus, the twin-track station at Billwerder-Moorfleet and at the only single-track station, Iserbrook.

All stations have electronic passenger information systems showing information about the line, destination, route, length and stopping position of the next train, missed connections and temporary disturbances to service.

Some stations, for example Landungsbrücken and Harburg Rathaus, are designed as civilian shelters. The heavy protective entrance doors are the only sign of this dual use.

== Service time and intervals ==
Trains run daily from about 04:30 to 01:00. There is an all-night service within the Hamburg section on the nights before Saturdays, Sundays, and public holidays in Germany.

The base frequency for lines S1, S2, S3, S5, and S7 during the day is 10 minutes; before 06:00, after 23:00 and during weekend night service, the frequency is 20 minutes. The S1 and multiple lines running on the same tracks, mainly through the city centre but also along the routes served by the S2/S7 and the S3/S5, have shorter intervals. Peak-time line S2 decrease intervals in the morning and afternoon.

== See also ==
- List of Hamburg S-Bahn stations
- Hamburg U-Bahn
- AKN Eisenbahn
- List of metro systems
- Rail transport in Germany

== Literature ==
- Erich Staisch: Die Hamburger S-Bahn. Chronik eines modernen Verkehrsmittels., Hamburg 1984, ISBN 3-455-08874-0 (German)
- Erich Staisch (Hrsg.): Die Hamburger S-Bahn. Geschichte und Zukunft., Hamburg 1996, ISBN 3-89234-694-1 (German)
- Wolfgang Pischek, Jan Borchers, Martin Heimann: Die Hamburger S-Bahn. Mit Gleichstrom durch die Hansestadt., Munich 2002, ISBN 3-7654-7191-7 (German)
- Michael Braun: "Hamburg lernt von Berlin. Punktsieg für Gleichstrom", in: LOK MAGAZIN Nr. 259, Munich 2003, p. 68–77, ISSN 0458-1822 (German)
