= Sifa =

Dead-man's vigilance device used in trains

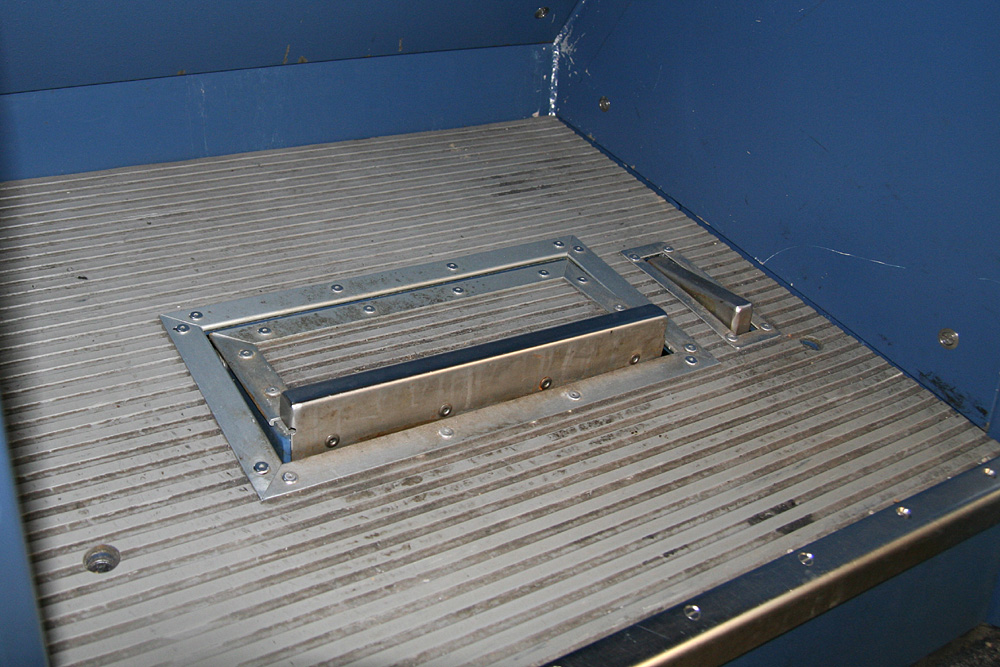
A Sifa pedal in an Intercity Express ICE 1 power car. To the right of the Sifa pedal is the foot-operated button for the train horn

Sifa is a type of deadman's control system used on German-influenced European railways. Although deadman's pedals are commonly used on railways worldwide, Sifa systems are specifically those codified by German Industrial Norms VDE 0119-207-5.

In Switzerland the equivalent system is called 'safety control' (Sicherheitssteuerung).

== Description ==
Sifa is short for Sicherheitsfahrschaltung, German for "safety driving circuit". It is usually a pedal and/or large press button, which monitors the alertness of the driver. The driver has to repeatedly press a button after a fixed interval; if they fail to do so, the train will carry out an emergency stop. It complements the external train safety systems: PZB, LZB and ETCS.

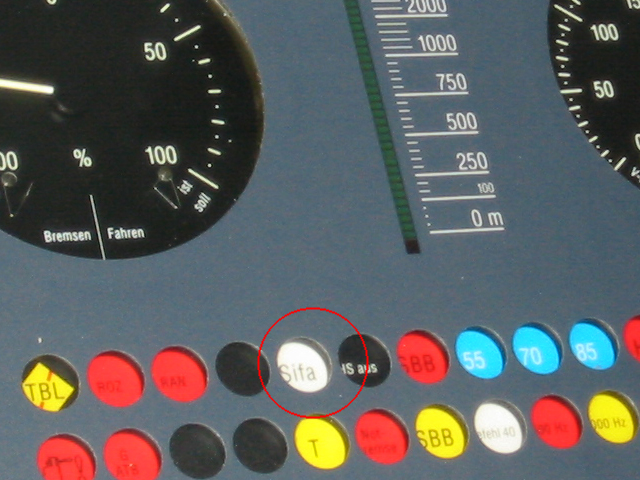
The Sifa control display in the ICE 3

In Europe the Zeit-Zeit-Sifa (time-time Sifa) is common. In this system, the engine driver holds a pedal or button down for 30 seconds and must then briefly release the pressure. Thus the system can confirm that the driver is still able to react. If the driver does not react after 30 seconds, the system warns the driver, at first optically, then for a few seconds acoustically. After a further short period of time without any reaction the train is automatically stopped. The Zeit-Weg-Sifa (time-distance Sifa) system takes account of the distance travelled, as well as time, since the last activation.

In electric trains such as those working on U- and S-Bahn lines the Sifa has for a long time been combined with the driving switch. This is where the concept of the dead man's switch first arose. If the button was released (due to the driver becoming incapacitated) the train was automatically stopped.

Drivers must carry out a Sifa test before using a train, to check that the automatic braking is functioning correctly.

Following some serious accidents in which drivers fell asleep but somehow the pedal was still being activated, the Deutsche Reichsbahn in East Germany introduced a special type of Sifa (Sifa86). Here the driver has to acknowledge, by pressing a button, an optical signal given at random times and distances.

== See also ==
- Automatic train protection (ATP)
- Dead man's switch
- Dead-man's vigilance device
- Train protection system
- Watchdog timer
- Emergency brake
- Hand brake
