= Hamburg-Bergedorf station =

Railway station in Hamburg, Germany

Hamburg Bergedorf
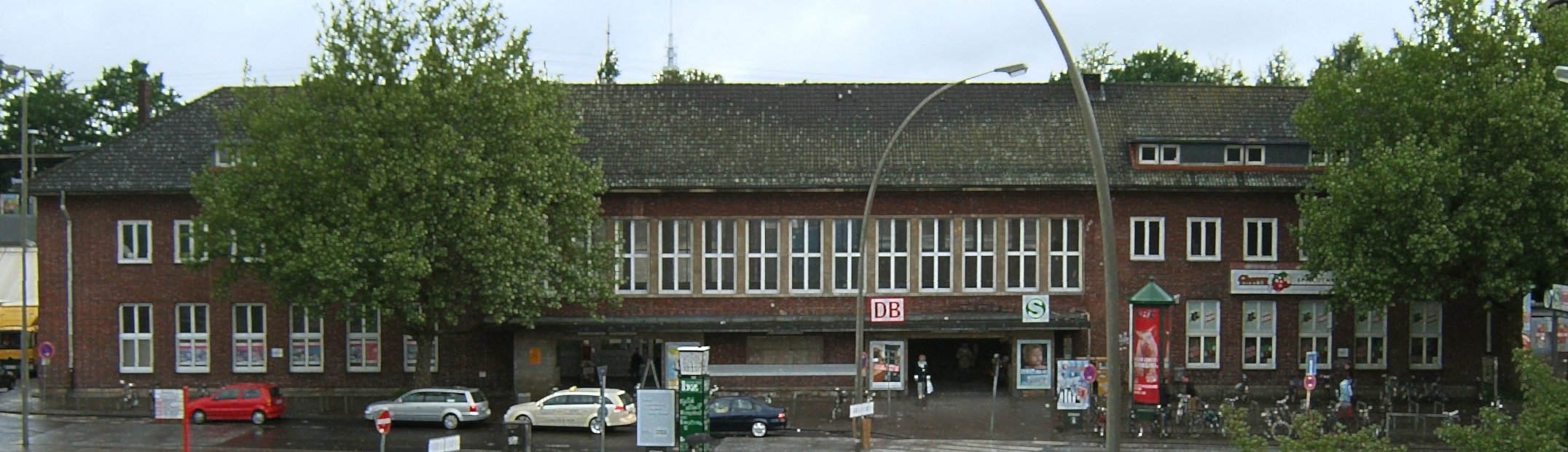
- The demolished, former station building

General information
- Location: Weidenbaumsweg 14, Bergedorf, Hamburg; Germany
- Coordinates: 53°29′22″N 10°12′23″E
- Line: Berlin–Hamburg
- Platforms: 4

Construction
- Structure type: Elevated (since 1936)
- Accessible: Yes

Other information
- Station code: 2518
- DS100 code: ABG
- IBNR: 8002554
- Category: 3
- Fare zone: HVV: B/506
- Website: www.bahnhof.de

History
- Opened: 16 May 1842; 184 years ago
- Electrified: 1 June 1958; 68 years ago, 1.2 kV DC system (3rd rail); 29 September 1996; 29 years ago, 15 kV 16 2/3 Hz AC system (overhead)
- Former names: 1842-1938 Bergedorf

Services
Preceding station	DB Fernverkehr	Following station
Hamburg Hbf towards Hamburg-Altona	ICE 26	Büchen One-way operation
Hamburg Hbf towards Hamburg-Altona	ICE 27	Büchen One-way operation
Hamburg Hbf towards Hamburg-Altona	RJ 27	Büchen towards Praha hl.n., Budapest Nyugati or Wien Hbf
Preceding station	DB Regio Nordost	Following station
Hamburg Hbf Terminus	RE 1	Schwarzenbek towards Rostock Hbf
Preceding station	Hamburg S-Bahn	Following station
Nettelnburg towards Hamburg-Altona	S2	Reinbek towards Aumühle
Location

Hamburg-Bergedorf station is a station in the municipality of same name in the German city of Hamburg. It is located between the districts of Bergedorf and Lohbrügge near the Bergedorf inner city and the City-Center Bergedorf shopping mall.

The station is served by Hamburg S-Bahn line S2 and regional services to Schwerin and Rostock as well as of individual long-distance services from or to Berlin and Mecklenburg-Vorpommern.

The associated central bus station is the busiest in southeastern Hamburg and serves inter alia bus routes connecting Vierlande, Geesthacht and the immediate surrounding region with the Hamburg S-Bahn network.

== History ==
Hamburg-Bergedorf station was put into operation with the Berlin–Hamburg railway on 15 December 1846. It was required because the old Bergedorf station was built on the originally planned route to Berlin but was not on the new alignment when plans changed.

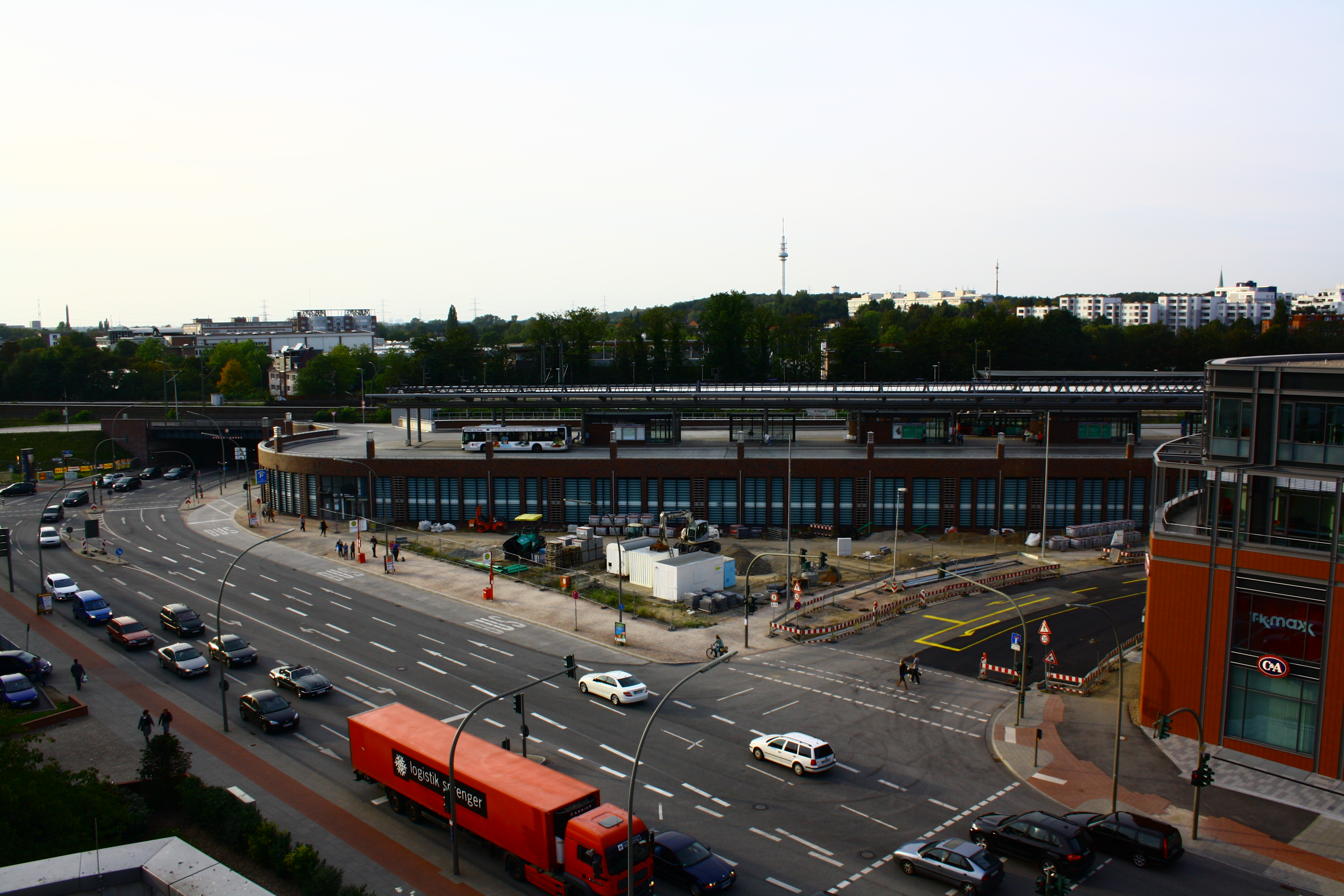
The new bus station a few days after its opening

When the level of the line to Berlin was raised in the Bergedorf area in the 1930s, a new station building was built in 1936-37, from which the trains of the Hamburg-Bergedorf Railway branched off. As this line was closed in the 1950s and the connecting track between Bergedorf-Süd and Bergedorf station was dismantled, some of the unused railway property was developed as a park-and-ride area in the early 1990s. During this time there was no platform track 1. After the Second World War, the importance of the line for long-distance traffic to Berlin fell sharply as a result of the division of Germany, so that in 1958 the S-Bahn was extended to Bergedorf station. In 1969, the S-Bahn was extended to Aumühle and Bergedorf became a through station. However, many S-Bahn services still terminate in Bergedorf.

After German reunification, long-distance passenger and freight traffic on the Berlin line grew strongly, so that as part of German Unity Transport Project (Verkehrsprojekt Deutsche Einheit) number 2, the long-distance and S-Bahn tracks were separated. At the same time the previous platform on track 2 was demolished and a new island platform was built for long-distance and regional traffic. A dispatcher's signal box (code named Bfs) was built at the eastern end of the station; S-Bahn operations between Rothenburgsort and Aumühle are controlled from it. The mainline tracks are equipped with the Linienzugbeeinflussung cab signalling and train protection system.

To improve the station environment in Bergedorf, the station building was demolished in 2008 and replaced by a new building–the third at this location.

== Remodeling ==
The station was rebuilt from April 2008 to April 2012 with a new station building and a new central bus station. The old station building, the old central bus station and the houses along the railway embankment were demolished. As a result of the land released, the new central bus station was moved closer to the tracks, which accommodated an extension to the CCB shopping centre. Due to poor weather conditions and time-consuming planning of its roof, its opening was delayed from mid-December 2010 to 17 September 2011.

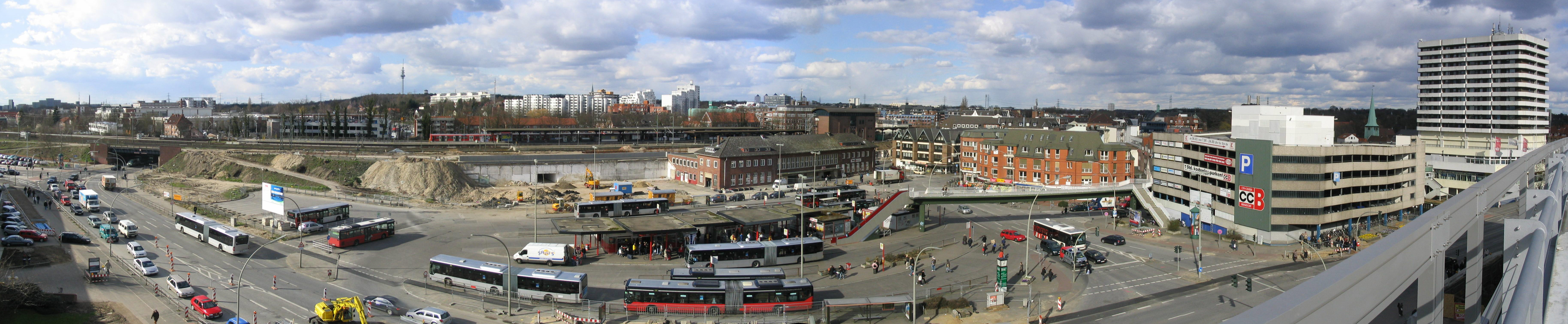
Panoramic photo of Bergedorf station at the beginning of the renovation work

== Platform usage ==
S-Bahn traffic is handled on platform tracks 3 and 4 (island platform) and on track 5 (side platform). The trains to Aumühle mostly stop on track 5, while the trains to Aumühle run from track 3, the S-Bahn trains that begin or end in Bergedorf regularly use track 4. The station precinct has a small parking area for S-Bahn trains towards Aumühle.

Platform tracks 1 and 2 (island platform) now serve regional services to Schwerin and Rostock and individual long-distance services from or to Berlin and Mecklenburg-Vorpommern. At the beginning of the first decade of the 2000s, Hamburg-Bergedorf was regular served by InterRegio services—and after the conversion of InterRegio services into intercity lines—intercity services.

== Local and long distance transport ==
=== Local services ===
Line	Route	Frequency
S2	Altona – Holstenstraße – Sternschanze – Dammtor – Hauptbahnhof – Berliner Tor – Rothenburgsort – Tiefstack – Billwerder-Moorfleet – Mittlerer Landweg – Allermöhe – Nettelnburg – Bergedorf – Reinbek – Wohltorf – Aumühle	10 min / 5 min
RE 1	Hamburg Hbf – Hamburg-Bergedorf — Schwerin – Rostock – Stralsund	2 h

=== Long-distance traffic ===
The station is served by two IC / EC services.

Line	Route	Frequency
ICE 26	Hamburg-Altona – Hamburg-Bergedorf – Schwerin – Bad Kleinen – Bützow – Rostock	Individual services
ICE 27	Hamburg-Altona – Hamburg-Bergedorf – Berlin – Dresden	Individual services
RJ 27	Hamburg-Altona – Hamburg Hbf – Hamburg-Bergedorf – Berlin Hbf – Dresden Hbf – Prague (– Budapest)	Individual services
