= Nettelnburg station =

Railway station in Hamburg, Germany

Nettelnburg
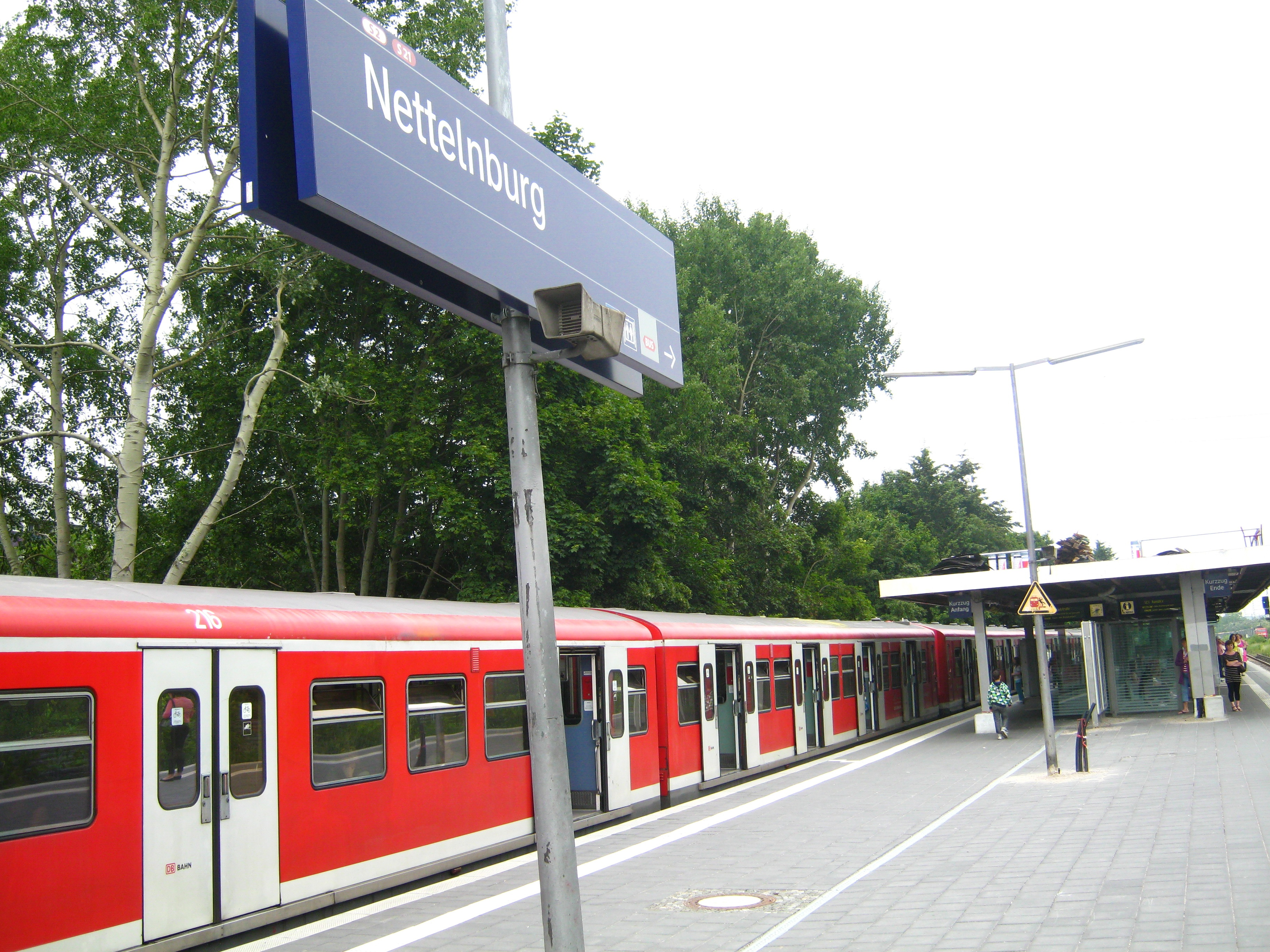

General information
- Location: Edith-Stein-Platz 1; 21035 Hamburg; Germany
- Coordinates: 53°29′16″N 10°10′52″E
- Operator: S-Bahn Hamburg GmbH
- Line: S2
- Platforms: 1 island platform
- Tracks: 2
- Connections: Bus

Construction
- Structure type: At grade
- Parking: Park and Ride (613 slots)
- Accessible: Yes

Other information
- Station code: ds100: ANTB; DB: 4345
- Fare zone: HVV: B/406, 407, and 506

History
- Opened: 28 May 1970; 56 years ago
- Electrified: at opening

Services
Preceding station	Hamburg S-Bahn	Following station
Allermöhe towards Hamburg-Altona	S2	Bergedorf towards Aumühle
Location
- Location within Hamburg Location within Schleswig-Holstein Location within Germany Location within Europe

Nettelnburg is a station on the Berlin-Hamburg railway line and served by the trains of Hamburg S-Bahn lines S2. The station was opened in 1970 and is located in the Hamburg suburb of Nettelnburg, Germany. Nettelnburg is part of the Hamburg borough of Bergedorf.

== History ==
The station was opened on 28 May 1970, after a major residential area of Nettelnburg north of the track had been built in the 1960s. From 1982 to 1994 the large residential area of Eastern Neuallermöhe south of the track was added, which is also connected by the station.

== Service ==
The line S2 of Hamburg S-Bahn call at Nettelnburg station. The travel time to Hamburg Hauptbahnhof is about 18 minutes.

== See also ==
- Hamburger Verkehrsverbund (HVV)
- List of Hamburg S-Bahn stations
