= Hamburg Berliner Bahnhof =

Former railway station in Germany

Coordinates: 53°32′49″N 10°0′32″E

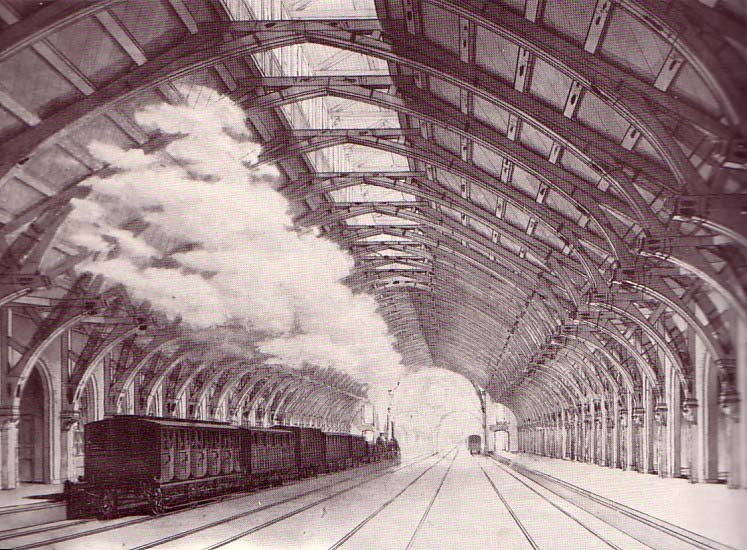
The wooden train shed

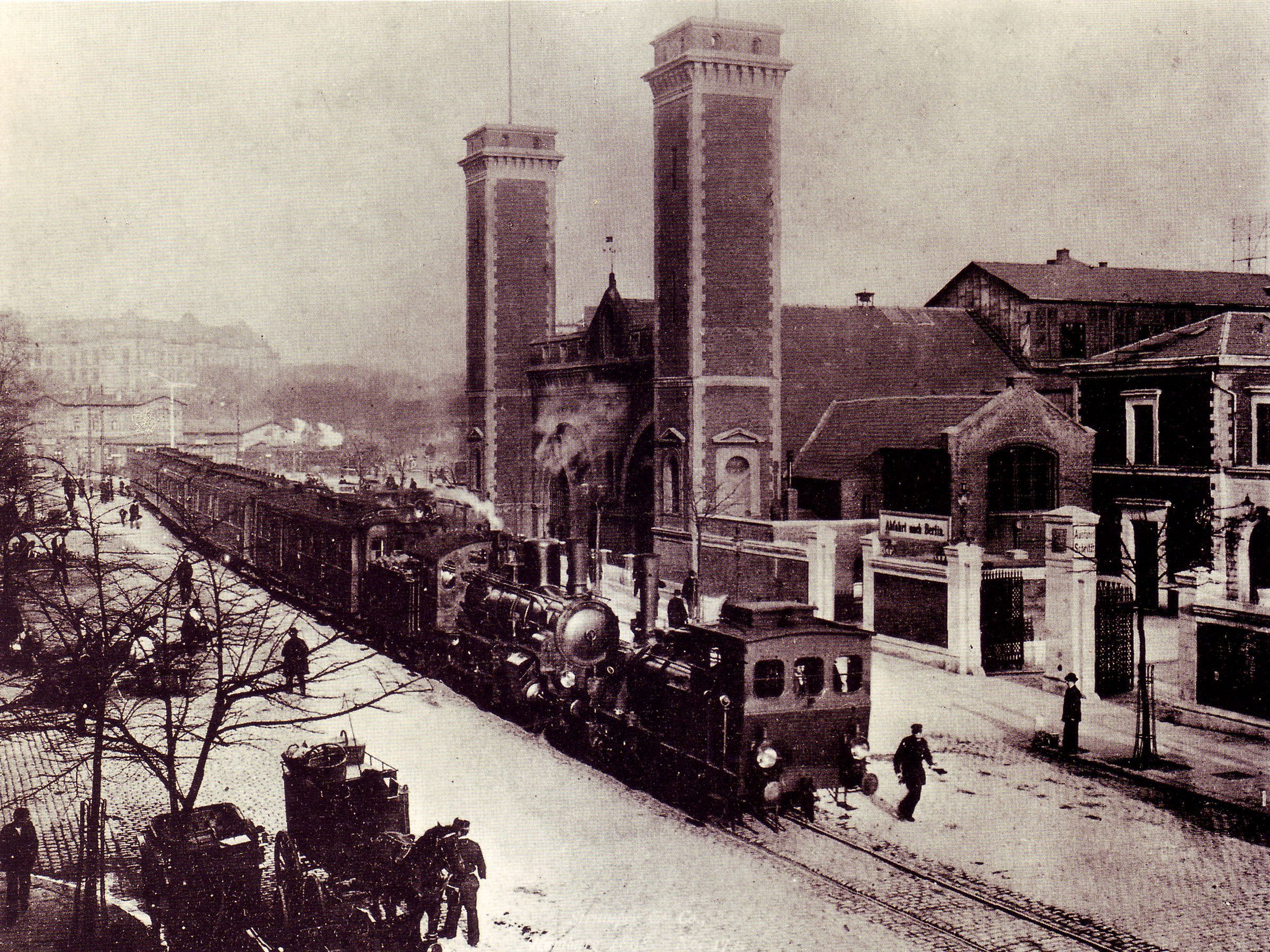
Entrance hall of the Berliner Bahnhof

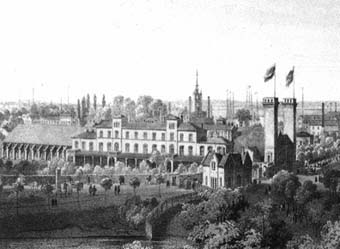
Panoramic view

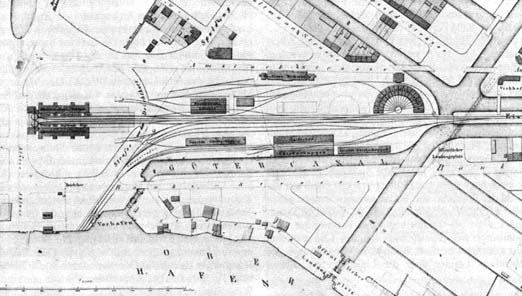
Track plan

The Berliner Bahnhof (Berlin line station) in the German city of Hamburg was the western terminus of the Berlin-Hamburg railway opened in 1846. It was previously the site of the station built in 1844 to a design by Alexis de Chateauneuf for the Hamburg-Bergedorf Railway. Berliner Bahnhof was completed in 1857 and closed in 1903.

== Structural features ==
The former Bergedorfer Bahnhof was extended for the needs of the Berlin-Hamburg railway using red brick with plastered cornices and provided with a 148-meter-long and 23.5 m-high wooden train shed with four tracks. This train shed was considered at the time to be the most substantial wooden structure in Germany. The station building was divided into departure and arrival areas with a baggage check-in and check-out and waiting rooms of different classes. It also had a ladies room.

The commissioning took place on 15 December 1846, but the renovation and construction of the 173 m-long building complex, the freight tracks and the roundhouse were not completed until 1857. The station had two high towers for an optical telegraph connection, but since an effective electrical telegraph had already been invented, they were purely decorative. The entrance building also had two turntables for locomotives. These were detached from the train and turned on the turntables so that they could pull the train in the opposite direction. The station precincts, which included a freight yard and a semi-circular engine shed, were about three times as long as the station.

== Location of other stations ==
The station was located on the south-eastern edge of the Wallring, in the area of the modern Deichtorhallen. Present-day Hamburg Hauptbahnhof lies a few hundred meters to the north, the Oberhafen (upper port) to the south. In 1865, the Lübecker Bahnhof (Lübeck line station) was built about 600 metres to the east at the end of the Lübeck–Hamburg railway and, in 1866, Hamburg Klosterthor station was built at the end of the Hamburg-Altona link line about 200 metres to the north. From this, a connecting track was later laid to the entrance of Hamburg Hauptbahnhof. The establishment of the first Hamburg Elbe bridge, which was usable only by the railways, connected to the Hannoverscher Bahnhof (Hanovarian station) on Grasbrook island, which lies opposite at the end of the line from the Ruhr, opened in 1874, and the line from Hanover, opened in 1847 from Celle to Harburg. Operations at the Hannoverscher Bahnhof began in 1872.

== End of operations ==
As part of the preparations for the construction of the Hamburg Hauptbahnhof, the Berliner Bahnhof was closed on 1 May 1903 and a temporary station was built on Lippeltstraße.

Map of the former stations, the new Hauptbahnhof and links

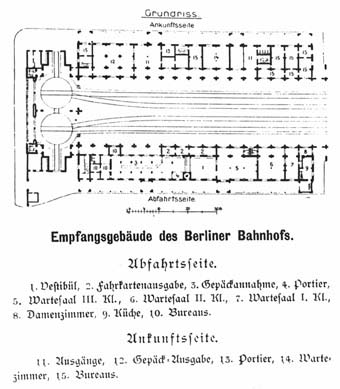
Floor plan of the entrance building
