= Reinbek station =

Railway station in Reinbek, Germany

Coordinates: 53.5083°N 10.2528°E

Reinbek
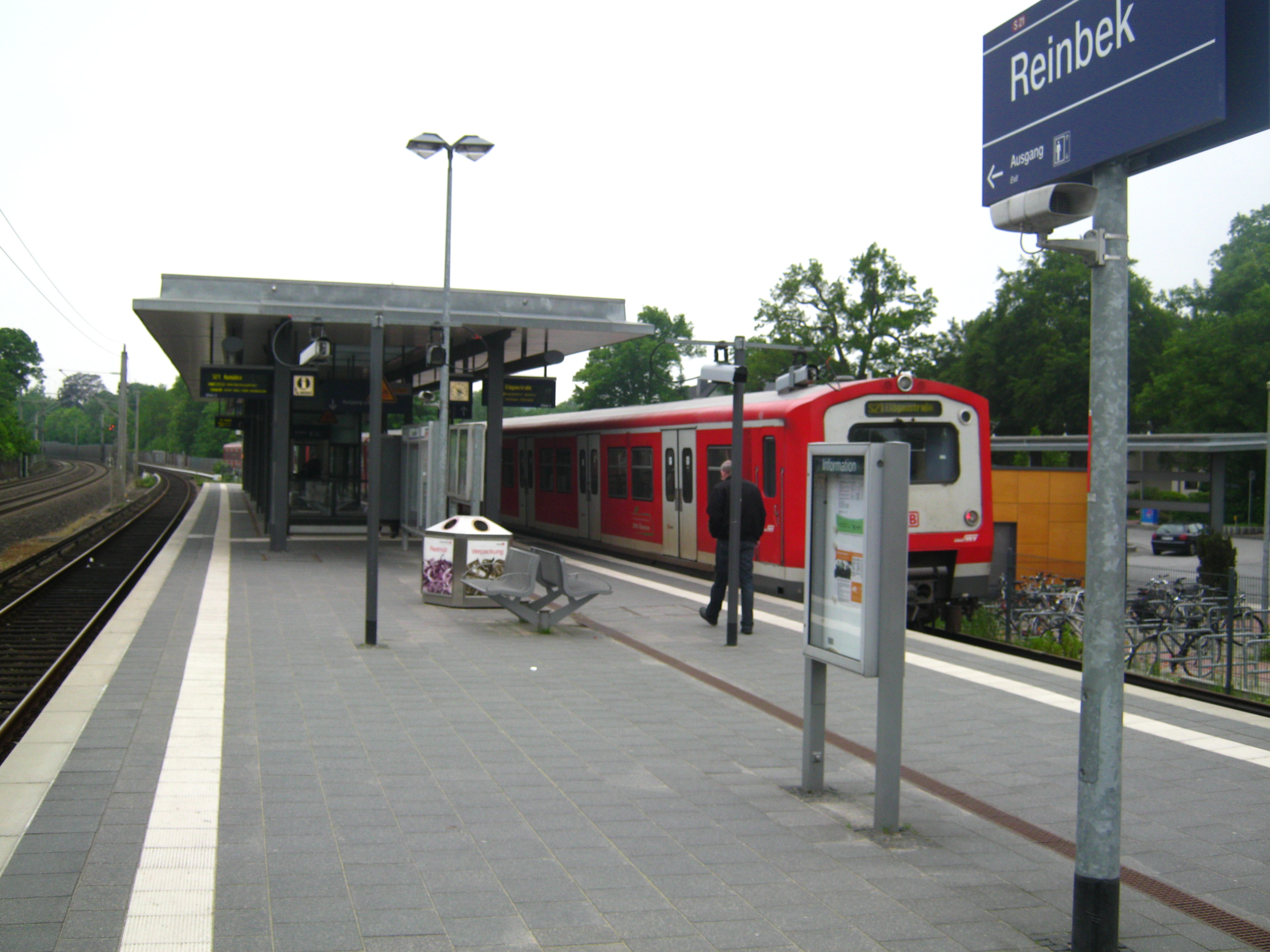
- Platform at Reinbek station

General information
- Location: Sophienstrasse 11; 21465 Reinbek; Germany
- Operator: S-Bahn Hamburg GmbH
- Line: S2
- Platforms: 1 island platform
- Tracks: 2
- Connections: Bus

Construction
- Structure type: At grade
- Parking: Park and Ride (176 slots)
- Accessible: Yes

Other information
- Station code: ds100: ARBK; DB: 5200
- Fare zone: HVV: B/506

History
- Opened: 15 December 1846; 179 years ago
- Electrified: 1 June 1969; 57 years ago

Services
Preceding station	Hamburg S-Bahn	Following station
Bergedorf towards Hamburg-Altona	S2	Wohltorf towards Aumühle
Location

Reinbek is a station on the Berlin-Hamburg railway line and served by the trains of Hamburg S-Bahn line S2. The station was originally opened in 1846 and is located in the town of Reinbek, near Hamburg, Germany.

== History ==
The station was originally opened on 15 December 1846 on the steam railway line to Berlin. Before 29 September 1968, steam trains served the station, which were originally called the S6 line of the HVV network. They were replaced by diesel locomotives for a few months, but already on 1 June 1969 the electrical S-Bahn was extended to Aumühle station.

From 24 May 1994 to 1 June 1997 S-Bahn operation rested behind Bergedorf - the separation of S-Bahn and railway tracks had been completed. For the following five years Reinbek was the terminus of the trains of the S21. On 26 May 2002 the S-Bahn to Aumühle was reopened. Before renovation track 1 (to Hamburg city) was located between two platforms, the northernmost of which was blocked by a fence for several years. Reinbek station was fully renovated afterwards at cost of around €6 million and re-opened on 29 March 2007. 2 lifts are in operation since then.

== Station layout ==
Reinbek is an at-level station with an island platform and 2 tracks. The station is unstaffed but an SOS and information telephone is available. There are some places to lock a bicycle and parking spots at a Park and Ride facility. The station is fully accessible for handicapped persons, as there are 2 lifts. Several shops are located at the station, as well as a taxi stand and a public toilet. There are no lockers.

== Service ==
The line S2 of Hamburg S-Bahn serves Reinbek station. The bus lines 136, 235, 236, 237, 436, and 736 as well as the night bus line 649 have a stop here.

== See also ==
- Hamburger Verkehrsverbund (HVV)
- List of Hamburg S-Bahn stations
