= Nettelnburg =

- Part of Hamburg
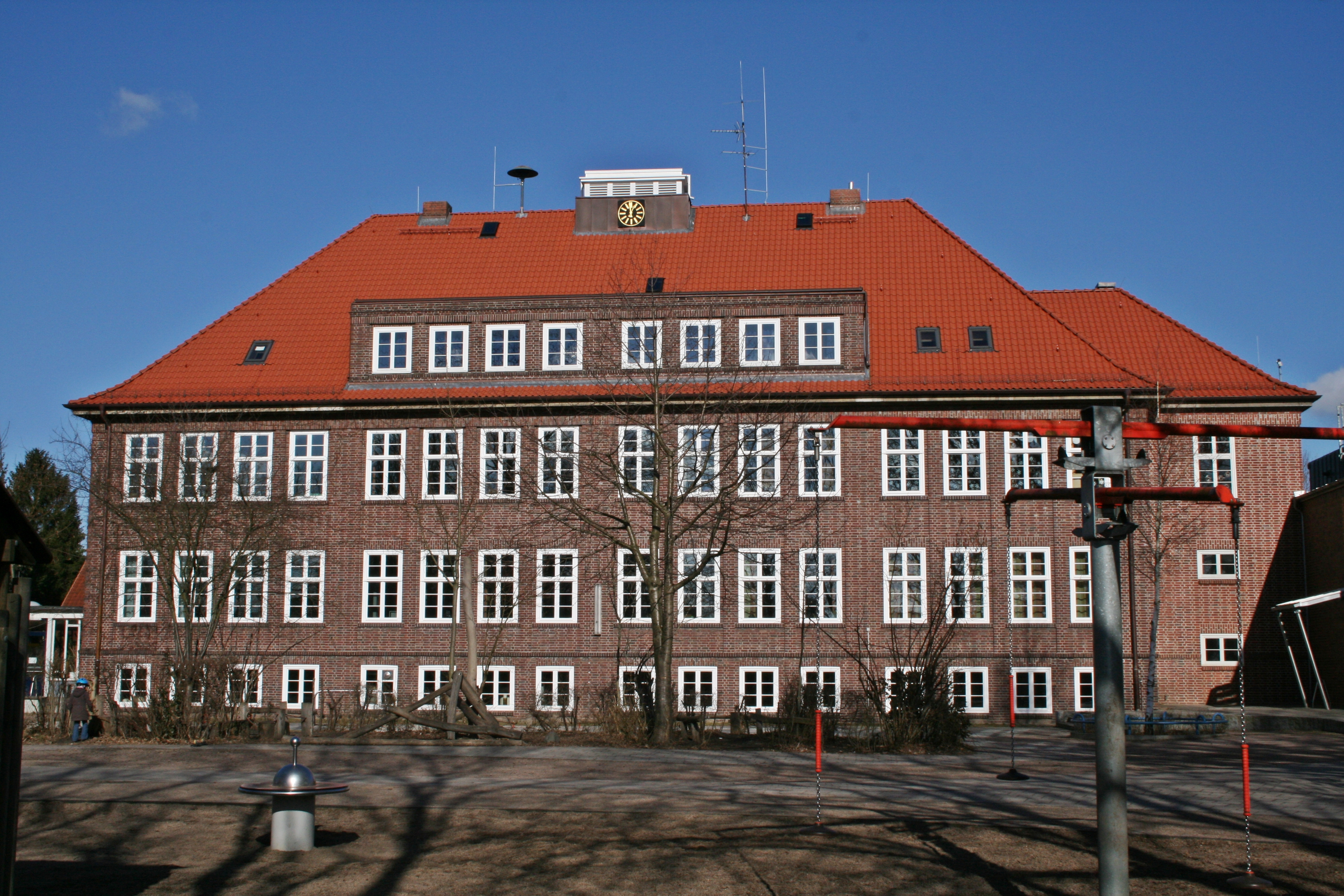
- School Fiddigshagen in Nettelnburg
- Interactive map of Nettelnburg
- Location within Germany Location within Hamburg
- Coordinates: 53°28′39.2″N 10°11′34.5″E
- Country: Germany
- State: Hamburg
- City: Hamburg
- Borough: Bergedorf
- Time zone: UTC+01:00 (CET)
  - Summer (DST): UTC+02:00 (CEST)
- Dialling codes: 040
- Vehicle registration: HH

"Nettelnburg" (Low German: "Nettelnborg") is a district of Hamburg-Bergedorf, bordering Allermöhe and Neuallermöhe, situated in the western marshes along the Elbe River. Nettelnburg is not an independent district but a part of the Bergedorf quarter. In the 1920s, Old-Nettelnburg was built under the supervision of architect Fritz Winterfeldt.

== History ==
According to a legend passed down by Amalie Schoppe, during the time of the Crusades, a branch of the Schauenburg family lived in a place called "Nettelburg." Historically, it is documented that the area of Nettelnburg belonged to the Schauenburgers and Stormarn until 1307. The name could be explained by the fact that the Schauenburgers had a nettle or "Nettelblatt" (nettle leaf) in their coat of arms.

Nettelnburg was first mentioned in a document in the year 1208 when a person named Wernherus von Netelenburg appeared as a witness during a property transfer. This confirms the existence of an early rural fiefdom. In a sales document from 1307, the Schauenburgers transferred their "gutere Nettelenburg" to the monastery "Reinebeck." However, no traces of such a castle have been found.

From 1609, two tenant farms are documented, which changed owners and overlords several times. After a major fire in October 1894, a mansion was built from 1895 onwards, serving as a villa in the Gründerzeit style. The building was purchased by the construction entrepreneur Philipp Holzmann in 1899. Despite protests from the Nettelnburg community, this historical structure, which was last used as a restaurant and hotel, was demolished in 2011.

=== Expansion of Old-Nettelnburg ===
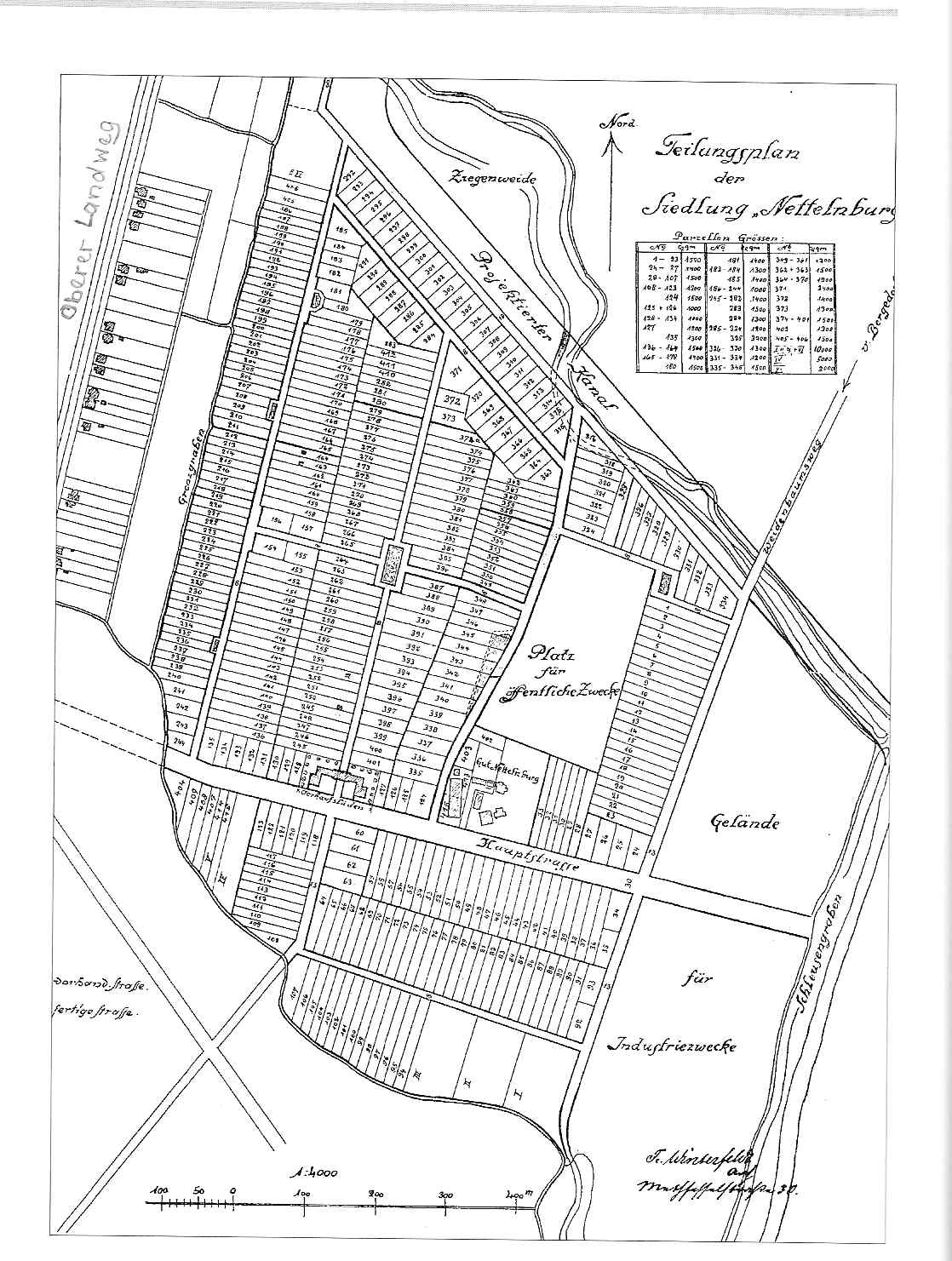
Partition plan 1921

In the first phase of construction, several villas were built around 1900 on Oberen Landweg.

After World War I, in 1919, due to the housing shortage, there were initial plans to establish a settlement community. The choice fell on the lands around Nettelnburg Manor, which had passed into the possession of the Industrial Land Company Nettelnburg due to the previous owners' insolvency. On March 13, 1921, the newly founded Gemeinnützige Siedlungsgenossenschaft Nettelnburg (Nonprofit Settlement Cooperative Nettelnburg) was able to acquire the area despite the high mortgage burden.

The settlement east of Oberen Landweg and west of Weidenbaumsweg, was established between 1921 and 1930 as a planned city under the direction of Hamburg architect Fritz Winterfeld. Initially, drainage ditches were dug in the heavy marshland soil as part of the community effort before the land was divided into plots larger than 1000 square meters. This delayed the start of construction until the spring of 1922.

Characterized by brick-built single or double houses with mansard roofs and hipped gables, the main entrance was located on what is now considered the first floor, while utility and cellar rooms were on the ground floor due to the high groundwater level and the risk of flooding. Most houses had a stable attached for small livestock. Each settlement house had a large vegetable garden bordered by drainage ditches. By August 1927, 235 houses were already occupied.

The settlement included shops, a fire station, a school, a pub, a public meeting place with sports facilities and a soccer field, but no church. Most settlers were workers or craftsmen affiliated with the SPD.

In late autumn 1930, there was a dike breach, causing many of the newly built settlement houses to be affected.

=== Era of National Socialism ===
Nettelnburg was colloquially known as the "Red Settlement." In the last free Reichstag elections on March 5, 1933, the SPD still received 65.00% of the votes, the KPD received 13.20%, while the NSDAP only got 16.37%. From April 1933, the Gleichschaltung (forcible coordination) began. The community chairman was removed from office, the local magazine, the "Nettelnburger Siedler," was renamed, and the editorial team was replaced. Even the members of the Volunteer Fire Department were replaced by loyal party comrades, which, however, did not prove successful. The school principal was dismissed. From January 1938, a Hitler Youth center was established at Oberen Landweg 10. In the same year, Nettelburg was released from its affiliation with Billwerder and annexed to the Bergedorf district. Nettelnburg largely escaped bombing during World War II.

=== Post-War Reconstruction ===
After the war, the settlement was expanded by building additional single and two-family houses following infrastructure development. The first rental building in Nettelnburg was constructed in 1954 as a commercial building with 4 shops and 17 apartments above.

Since 1970, single-family houses, some as terraced houses, were built again in Nettelnburg-SOuth, Oberer Landweg, and Old-Nettelnburg. These are integrated into a planned landscape of fleets (controlled or constructed watercourses) and green spaces. Today, Nettelnburg presents itself as a garden city, with the Old-Nettelnburg settlement considered an important architectural monument of the 1920s due to its uniform appearance.

== Transportation ==
Since 1970, Nettelnburg has had an S-Bahn station on the S2 line from Hauptbahnhof (central station) to Bergedorf and Aumühle, which also serves the large residential area of Bergedorf-West located north of the S-Bahn line.
