= Wohltorf station =

Railway station in Wohltorf, Germany

Coordinates: 53.5207°N 10.2781°E

Wohltorf
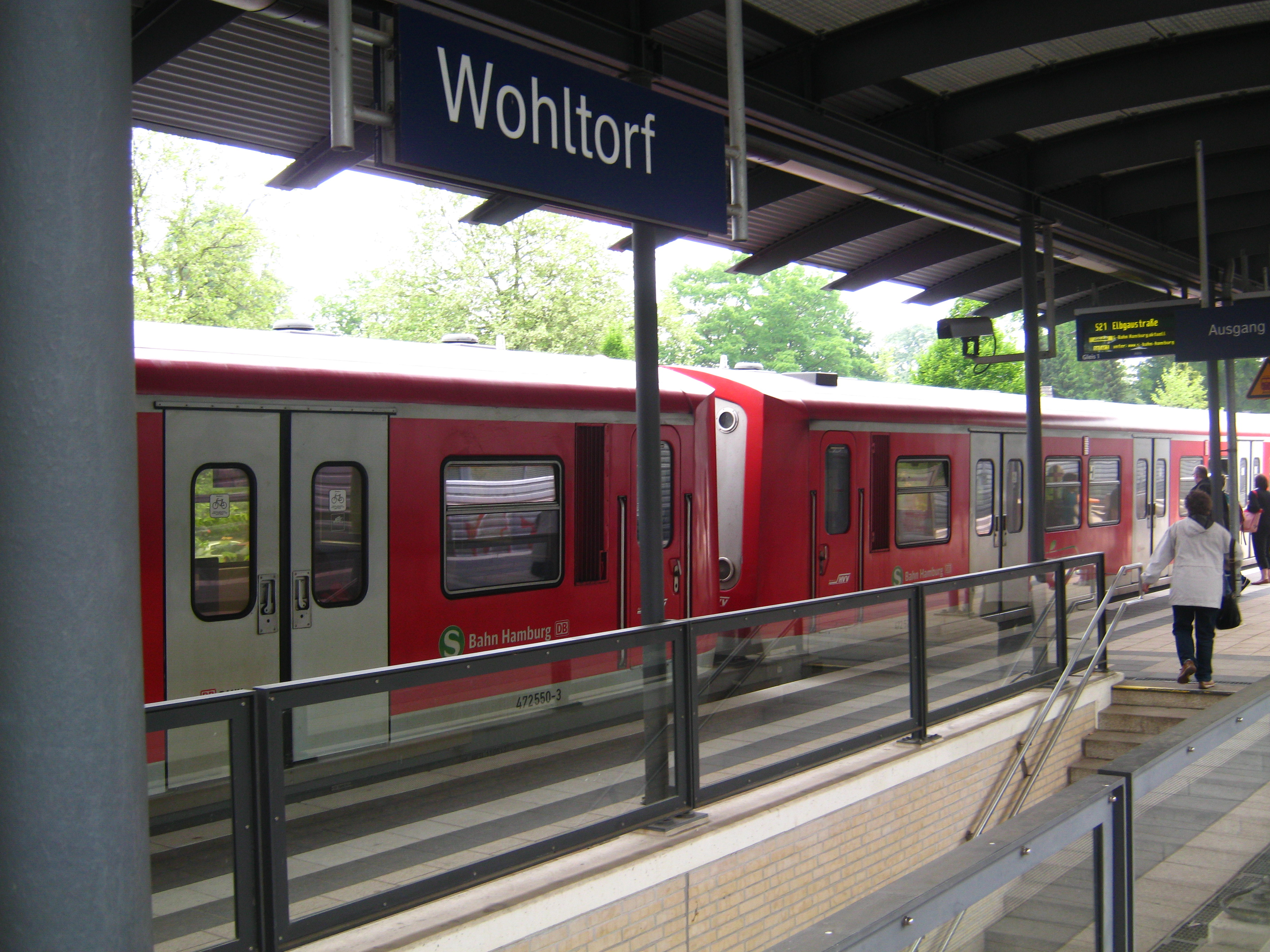
- Platform at Wohltorf station

General information
- Location: Kastanienallee; 21521 Wohltorf; Germany
- Operator: S-Bahn Hamburg GmbH
- Line: S2
- Platforms: 1 island platform
- Tracks: 2

Construction
- Structure type: At grade
- Parking: Park and Ride (80 slots)
- Accessible: Yes

Other information
- Station code: ds100: AWLF; DB: 6845
- Fare zone: HVV: C/606 and 625

History
- Opened: 15 December 1846; 179 years ago
- Rebuilt: 26 May 2002
- Electrified: 1 June 1969; 57 years ago

Services
Preceding station	Hamburg S-Bahn	Following station
Reinbek towards Hamburg-Altona	S2	Aumühle Terminus
Location

Wohltorf is a station on the Berlin-Hamburg railway line and served by the trains of Hamburg S-Bahn line S2. The station is located in the village of Wohltorf, near Hamburg, Germany.

== History ==
The station was originally opened on steam railway line to Berlin. Before 29 September 1968, steam trains served the station, which were originally called the S6 line of the HVV network. They were replaced by diesel locomotives for a few months, but already on 1 June 1969 the electrical S-Bahn was extended to Aumühle station.

From 24 May 1994 to 1 June 1997 S-Bahn operation rested behind Bergedorf - the separation of S-Bahn and railway tracks had been completed. For the following five years preceding station Reinbek was the terminus of the trains of the S21, so again there was no S-Bahn service in Wohltorf. On 26 May 2002 the S-Bahn to Aumühle and also the completely re-built station in Wohltorf, now surrounded by noise barriers, were reopened.

== Station layout ==
Wohltorf is an at-level station with an island platform and 2 tracks. The station is unstaffed but an SOS and information telephone is available. There are some places to lock a bicycle and parking spots at a Park and Ride facility. The station is fully accessible for handicapped persons, as there is a lift. There are no lockers.

== Service ==
The line S2 of Hamburg S-Bahn serves Wohltorf station.

== See also ==
- Hamburger Verkehrsverbund (HVV)
- List of Hamburg S-Bahn stations
