= Aumühle station =

Railway station in Schleswig-Holstein (Germany)

Aumühle
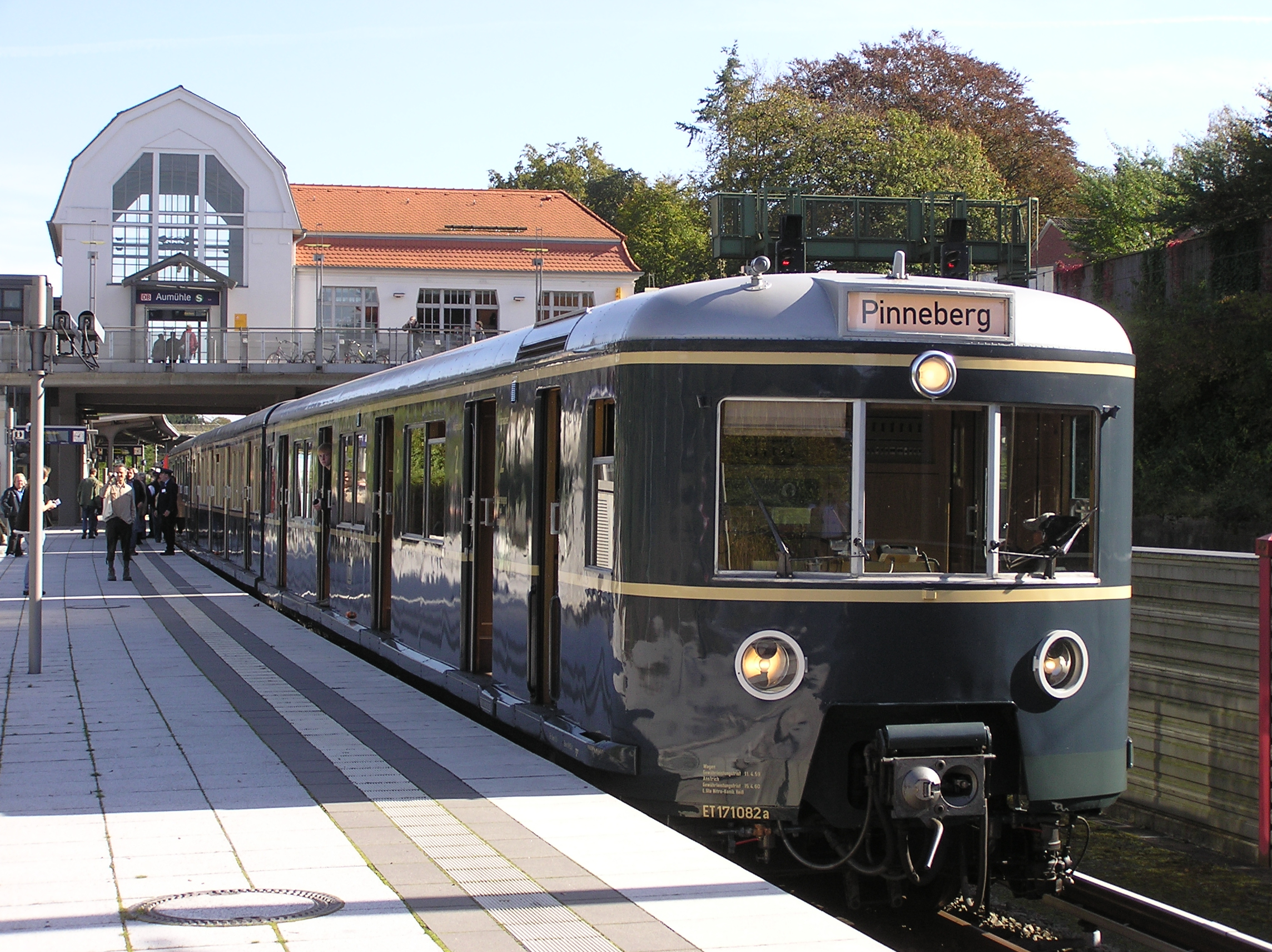

General information
- Location: Bahnhofstraße 1; 21521 Aumühle, Germany
- Coordinates: 53°31′47″N 10°18′51″E
- Operator: DB Station&Service AG
- Line: S2
- Platforms: 1 island platform
- Tracks: 2
- Connections: Bus

Construction
- Structure type: At grade
- Parking: Park and Ride (80 slots)
- Accessible: Yes

Other information
- Station code: DB: 0229
- Fare zone: HVV: C/606 and 625

History
- Opened: 1884; 142 years ago
- Electrified: 1 June 1969; 57 years ago 1200 volts DC system (3rd rail); 29 September 1996; 29 years ago 15 kV 16 2/3 Hz AC system (overhead)

Services
Preceding station	Hamburg S-Bahn	Following station
Wohltorf towards Hamburg-Altona	S2	Terminus
Location

Aumühle is a station on the Berlin-Hamburg railway line, just outside the Free and Hanseatic City of Hamburg. Aumühle is served by the rapid transit trains of Hamburg S-Bahn line S2, for which it is also the eastern terminus station. The station was opened in 1884 and is located in Aumühle, a municipality in the German state of Schleswig-Holstein.

== History ==
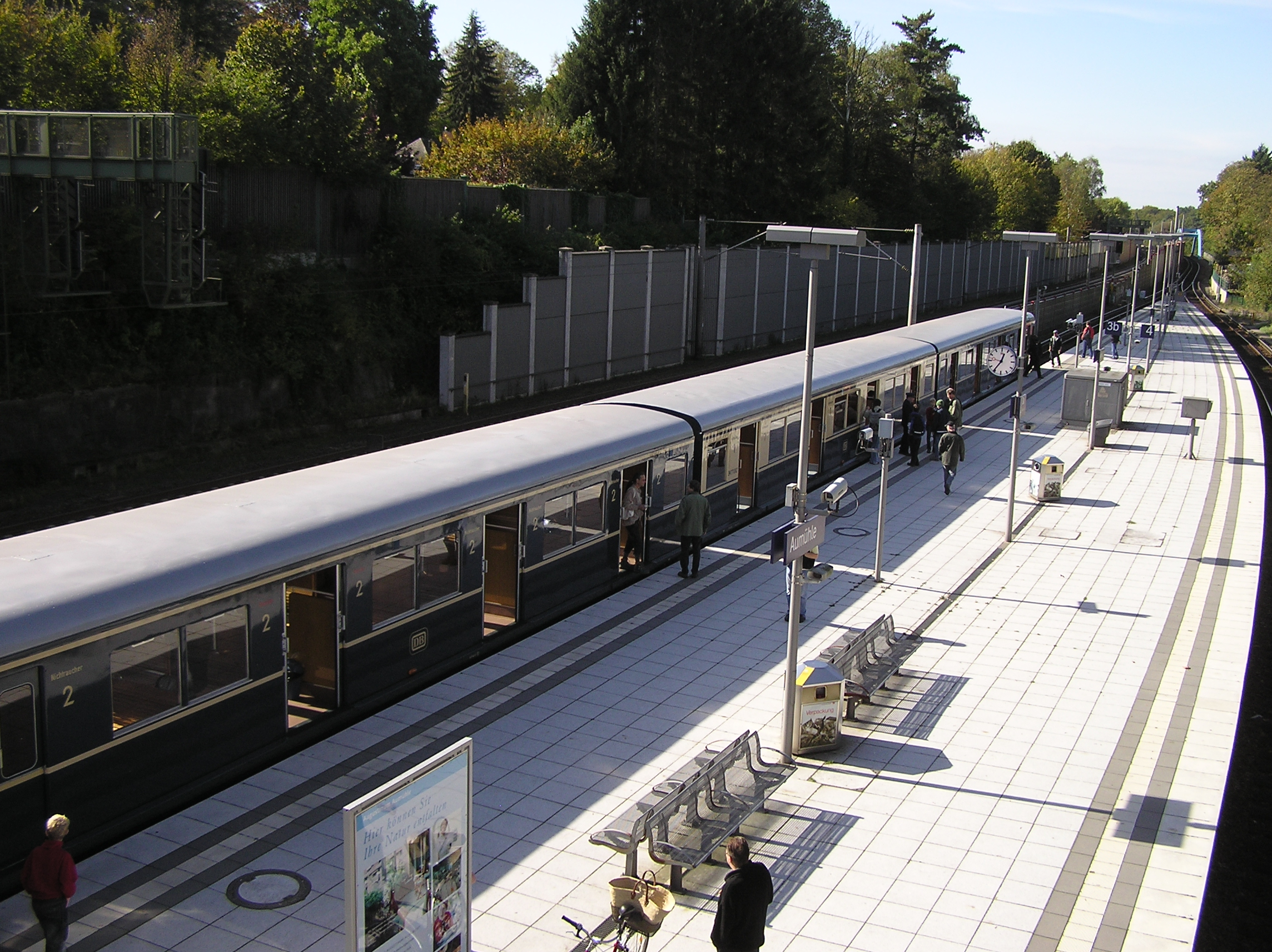
The platform seen from the station building

Aumühle station was opened in 1884 with two side platforms and a pedestrian bridge. In 1910 the station was expanded to four tracks and complemented with today's listed station building. In 1969 Aumühle station was electrified and integrated into the Hamburg S-Bahn network.

== Station layout ==
The station's layout is using a natural depression to sit below street level. Above the rail tracks, Bahnhofstraße is crossing via a road bridge. At the bridge's midpoint lies the station building, with access to the platform below also possible via an elevator.

== Service ==
=== Trains ===
Aumühle

General information
- Location: Aumühle, Schleswig-Holstein; Germany
- System: Bf
- Line: Berlin–Hamburg railway

Other information
- Station code: 0229
- DS100 code: AAMS
- Category: 4
Location

The Hamburg S-Bahn line S2 calls at Aumühle station.

=== Route information ===
Line	Route	Frequency
S2	Altona – Holstenstraße – Sternschanze – Dammtor – Hauptbahnhof – Berliner Tor – Rothenburgsort – Tiefstack – Billwerder-Moorfleet – Mittlerer Landweg – Allermöhe – Nettelnburg – Bergedorf – Reinbek – Wohltorf – Aumühle	10 min/ 20 min

== See also ==
- Hamburger Verkehrsverbund (HVV)
- List of Hamburg S-Bahn stations
