= Allermöhe station =

Railway station in Hamburg, Germany

Allermöhe
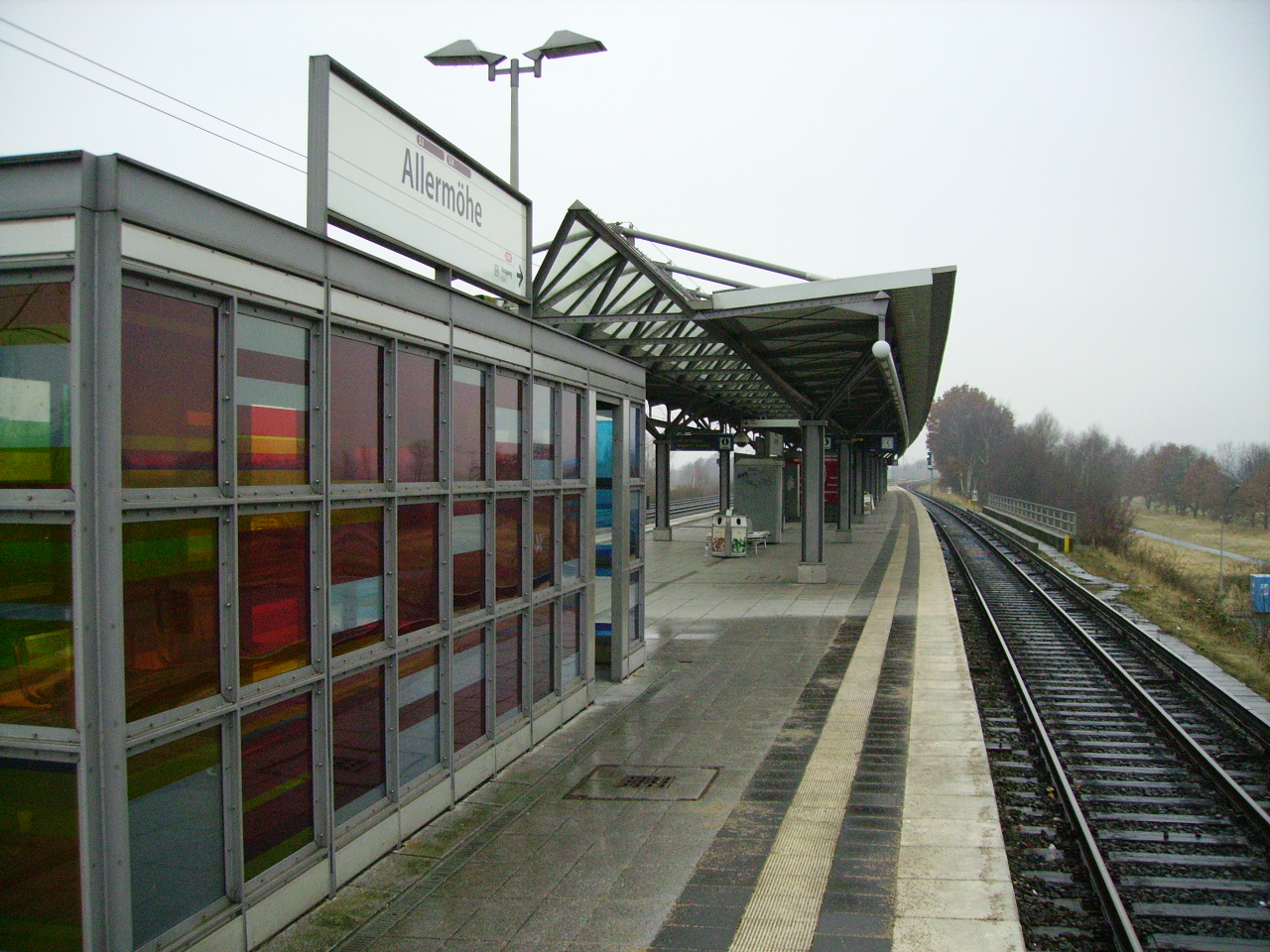

General information
- Location: Fleetplatz 1; 21035 Hamburg, Germany
- Coordinates: 53°29′25″N 10°9′30″E
- System: Hamburg S-Bahn station
- Owner: Deutsche Bahn
- Operator: DB Netz; DB Station&Service
- Line: S2
- Platforms: 1 island platform
- Tracks: 2
- Connections: Bus

Construction
- Structure type: Elevated
- Parking: Park and ride
- Accessible: Yes

Other information
- Station code: ds100: AALH; DB station code: 7979; Category: 4
- Fare zone: HVV: B/406 and 407

History
- Opened: 30 May 1999; 27 years ago
- Electrified: at opening

Services
| Preceding station | Hamburg S-Bahn | Following station |
|---|---|---|
| Mittlerer Landweg towards Hamburg-Altona | S2 | Nettelnburg towards Aumühle |
Location

Allermöhe station is a railway station served by the city trains, located in Hamburg, Germany, in the quarter of Neuallermöhe in the borough Bergedorf.

== History ==
The station was opened on 30 May 1999 to connect the newly developed residential area of Neuallermöhe West. It is the third newest S-Bahn station in Hamburg behind Hamburg Airport station and Fischbek station.

== Station layout ==
The station is elevated with one island platform and two tracks.

== Station services ==
=== Trains ===
The rapid transit trains of the line S2 of the Hamburg S-Bahn calls the station.

=== Buses ===
In front of the railway station is a bus stop.

== See also ==
- Hamburger Verkehrsverbund (HVV)
- List of Hamburg S-Bahn stations
