= Hamburg-Bergedorf Railway Company =

Railway line in Northern Germany

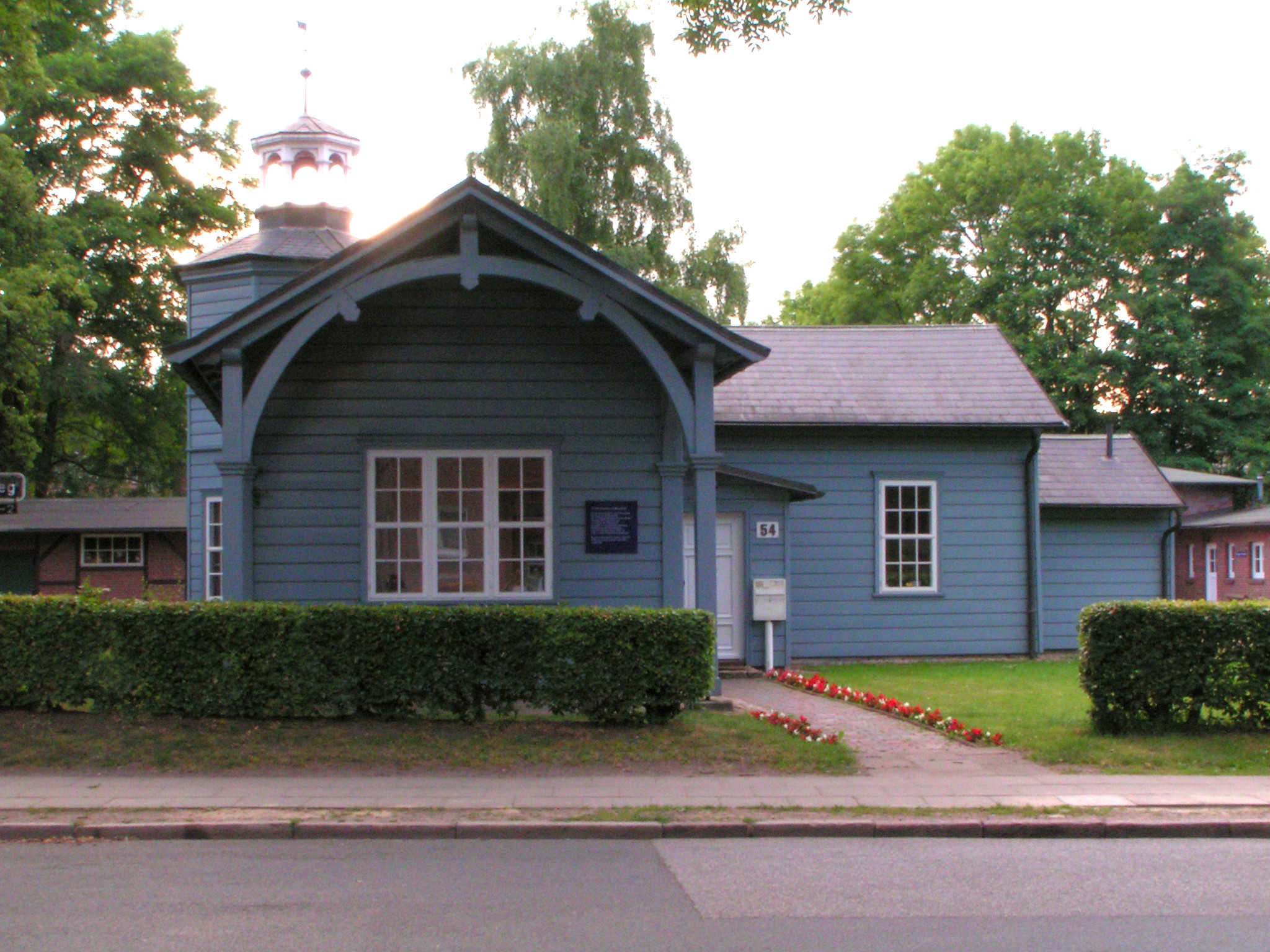
Bergedorf station 1842-46, now used for social functions

The Hamburg-Bergedorf railway opened in 1842 is one of the oldest lines in Germany and was the first railway line in Northern Germany. The 16.5 km long line was extended to Berlin in 1846.

It linked Bergedorf Station (German: Bergedorfer Bahnhof) in Hamburg, near Deichtorplatz (just south of the modern Hamburg Hauptbahnhof) with the original Bergedorf station at Neuen Weg in Bergedorf.

Hamburg public opinion was most interested in a rail connection with the Baltic port of Lübeck. This route would have, however, needed to pass through Holstein, which was administered in a personal union by the Danish king. Denmark’s consent was not required for a line from Hamburg to Bergedorf, since it would only run through areas controlled by Hamburg. The track was planned and surveyed by the English engineer William Lindley in 1838.

The opening was scheduled for 7 May 1842. Two days earlier, the Great Fire of Hamburg broke out and largely destroyed the city. The first trips were actually held prior to 7 May: they were used to transport fire-fighting equipment and fire-fighters to Hamburg and to evacuate the homeless. Therefore, no opening ceremony was held.

The stations on the line were all designed by the Hamburg architect Alexis de Chateauneuf.

Already during the planning of the railway an extension had been considered via Geesthacht and Lauenburg to Berlin. On 15 December 1846 Berlin–Hamburg Railway opened; however, on a route further north, through Büchen, the starting point of a line to Lübeck opened in 1851. A new station was established in Bergedorf and the old Bergedorf station closed. Nearby Bergedorf Süd station opened on the Bergedorf-Geesthacht Railway opened in 1906 and closed in the 1950s.

The Hamburg Bergedorf station was expanded after 1846 and was renamed Berlin Station (German: Berliner Bahnhof). The Hamburg-Bergedorf Railway Company was taken over by the Berlin-Hamburg Railway Company (German: Berlin-Hamburger Eisenbahn-Aktiengesellschaft).
