= Neuallermöhe =

- Quarter of Hamburg
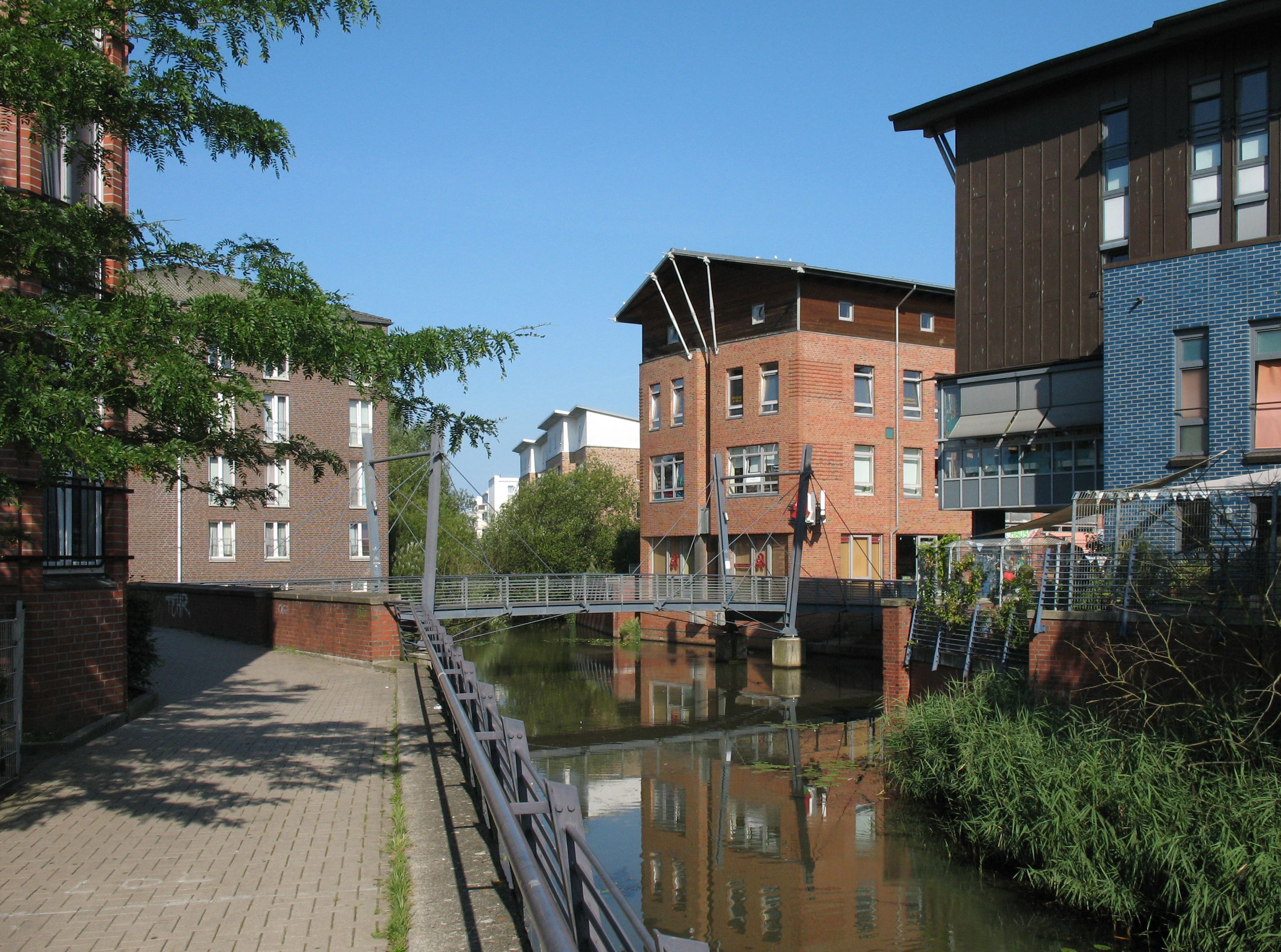
- River in Neuallermöhe
- Interactive map of Neuallermöhe
- Location within Germany Location within Hamburg
- Coordinates: 53°29′0″N 10°10′0″E
- Country: Germany
- State: Hamburg
- City: Hamburg
- Borough: Bergedorf

Area
  - Total: 4.2 km^{2} (1.6 sq mi)

Population (2024-12-31)
  - Total: 23,233
  - Density: 5,500/km^{2} (14,000/sq mi)
- Time zone: UTC+01:00 (CET)
  - Summer (DST): UTC+02:00 (CEST)
- Dialling codes: 040
- Vehicle registration: HH

Neuallermöhe (German pronunciation: [ˌnɔʏʔalɐˈmøːə], lit. 'New Allermöhe', in contrast to Allermöhe) is a quarter of Hamburg, Germany, in the borough of Bergedorf. In 2020 the population was over 23,000.

== Geography ==
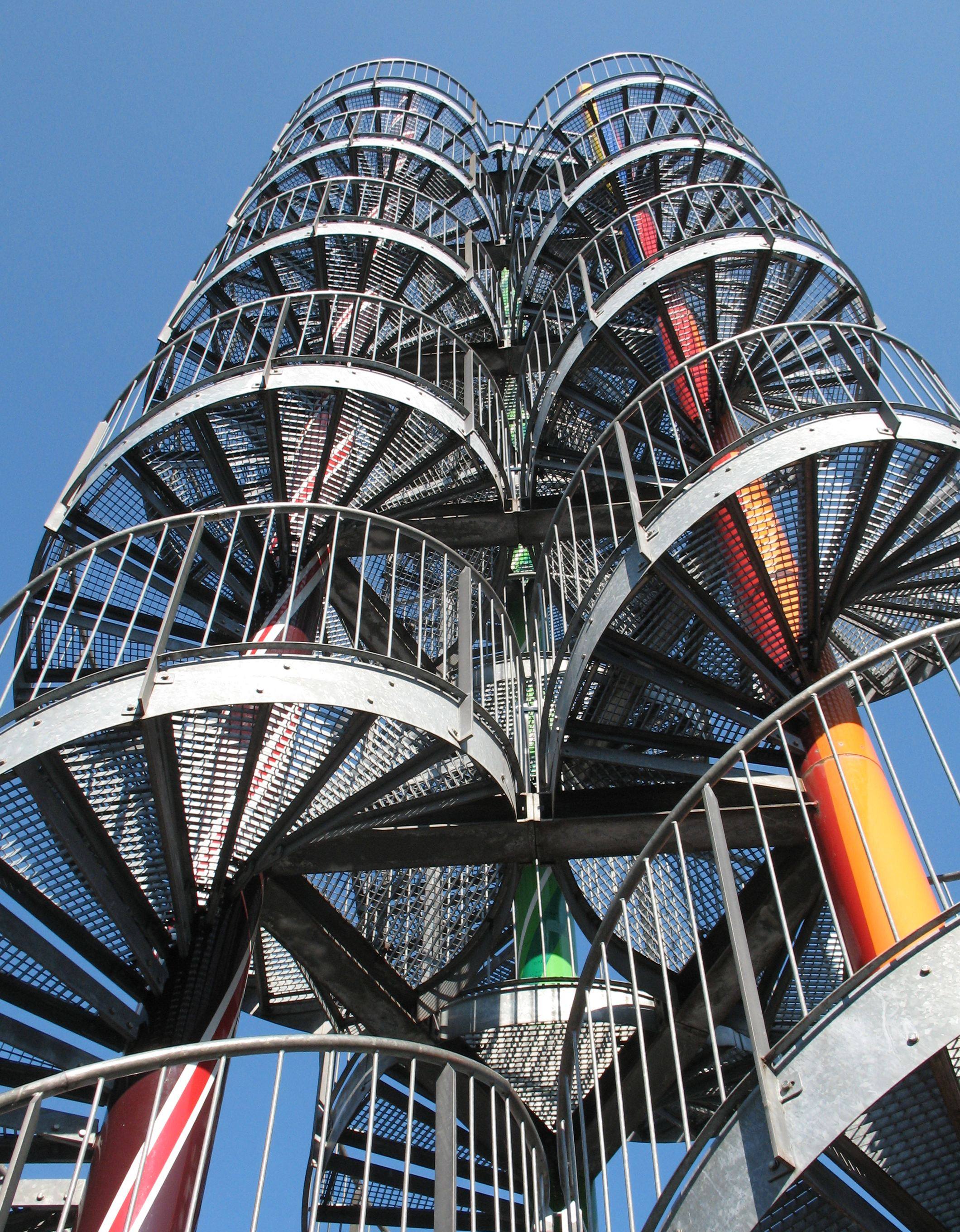
Viewing platform „Zuckerstangen“

Neuallermöhe limits to the Berlin-Hamburg Railway and Billwerder to the north. It also borders with Allermöhe and Bergedorf. The quarter is divided into Neuallermöhe-West and Neuallermöhe-East. The quarter is well known for the town canals.

== History ==
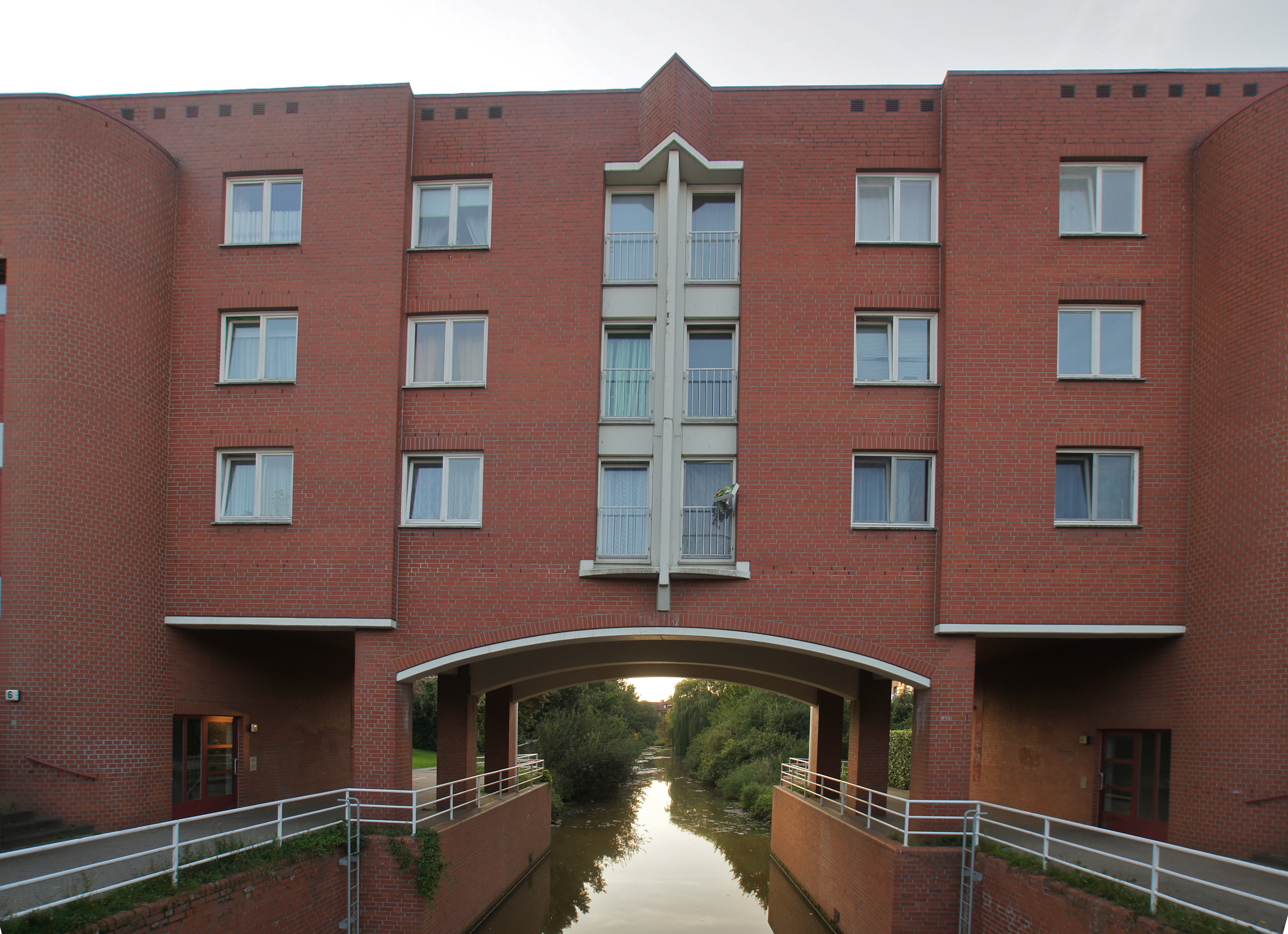
Apartment building in Neuallermöhe

Neuallermöhe-East was built from 1982 until 1994. Neuallermöhe-West has been built since the 1990s. It was the youngest quarter until the foundation of HafenCity.

== Politics ==
These are the results of Neuallermöhe in the Hamburg state election:

State Election	SPD	Greens	AfD	CDU	Left	FDP	Others
2025	32.3 %	9.9 %	21.0 %	16.8 %	10.6 %	1.2 %	8.2 %
2020	40.9 %	16.6 %	11.8 %	10.4 %	9.3 %	2.9 %	7.6 %
2015	51.7 %	7.1 %	9.4 %	12.4 %	11.1 %	2.8 %	5.5 %
2011	54.8 %	7.9 %	–	18.4 %	9.2 %	2.9 %	6.6 %

== Transport ==
Neuallermöhe has two S-Bahn stations called Allermöhe and Nettelnburg. Furthermore six different bus lines go through the quarter. Neuallermöhe has access to the Autobahn 25.
