= Berlin–Hamburg railway =

Railway line in Germany

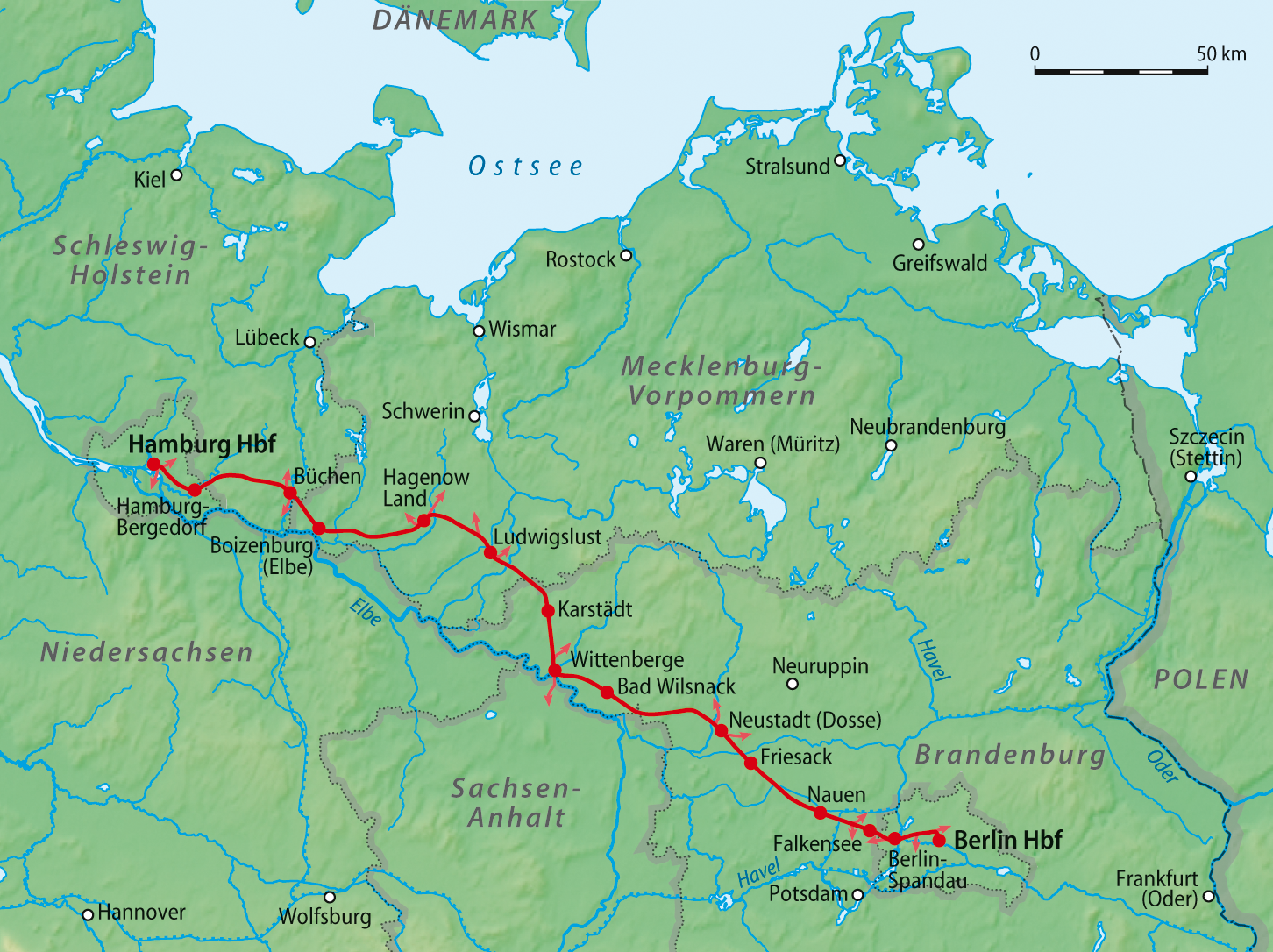

Overview
- Native name: Berlin-Hamburger Bahn
- Line number: 6100
- Locale: Berlin, Brandenburg, Mecklenburg-Vorpommern, Schleswig-Holstein and Hamburg, Germany

Service
- Route number: Hamburg–Hagenow: 100; Hamburg–Büchen: 102; Hagenow–Ludwigslust: 172; Ludwigslust–Berlin: 204; Nauen–Berlin: 209.10, 209.14; Berlin S-Bahn: 200.75, 200.9; Hamburg S-Bahn: 101.2, 101.21

Technical
- Line length: 284.1 km (176.5 mi)
- Track gauge: 1,435 mm (4 ft 8 1/2 in) standard gauge
- Electrification: 15 kV/16.7 Hz AC catenary (long-distance); 750 V DC third rail (Berlin S-Bahn); 1,200 V DC third rail (Hamburg S-Bahn)
- Operating speed: 230 km/h (140 mph)

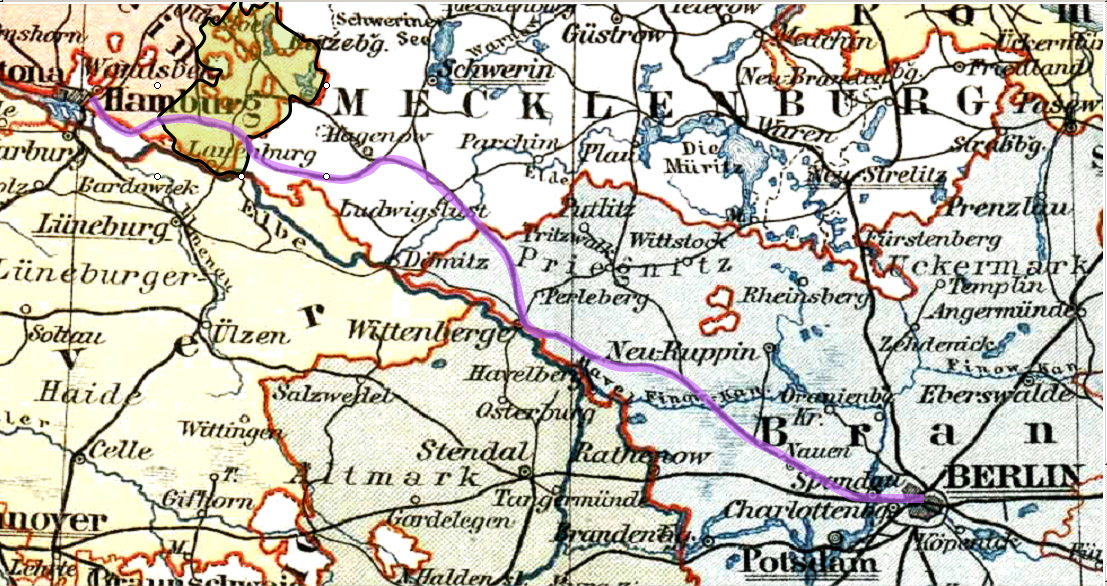
Course of the railway through the old German states

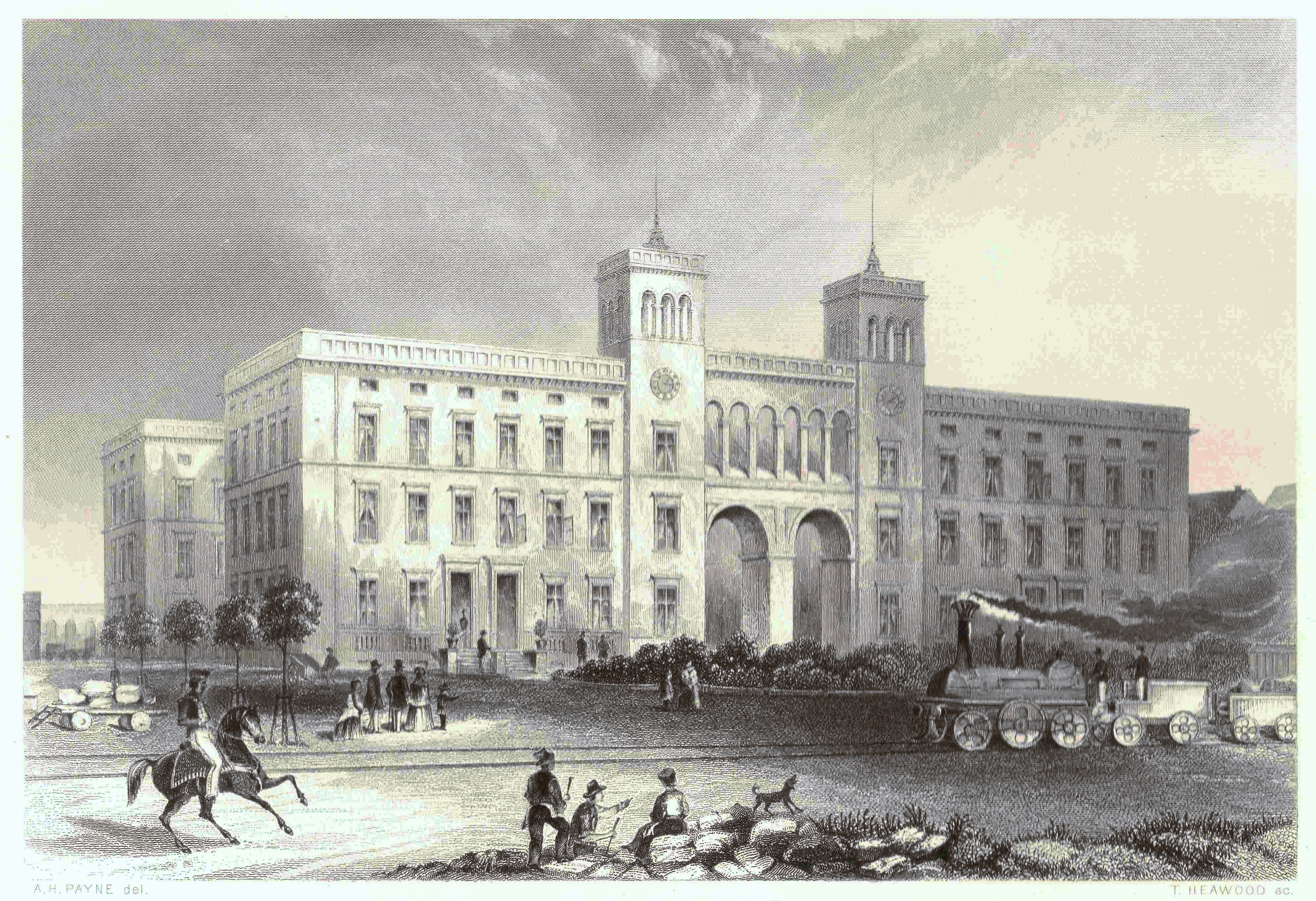
Hamburger station in Berlin in 1850

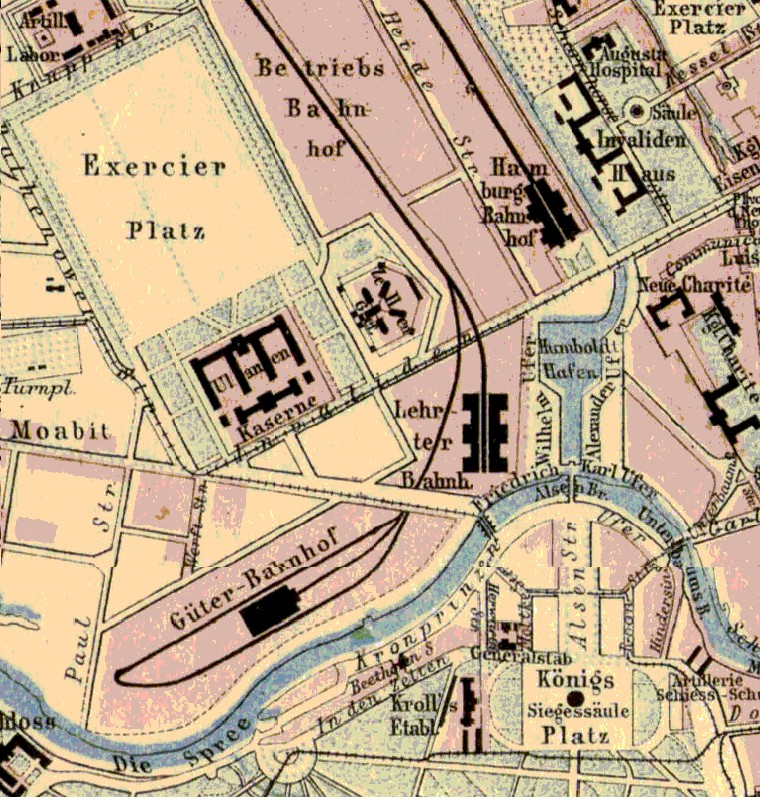
Hamburger station and Lehrter station in Berlin in 1875

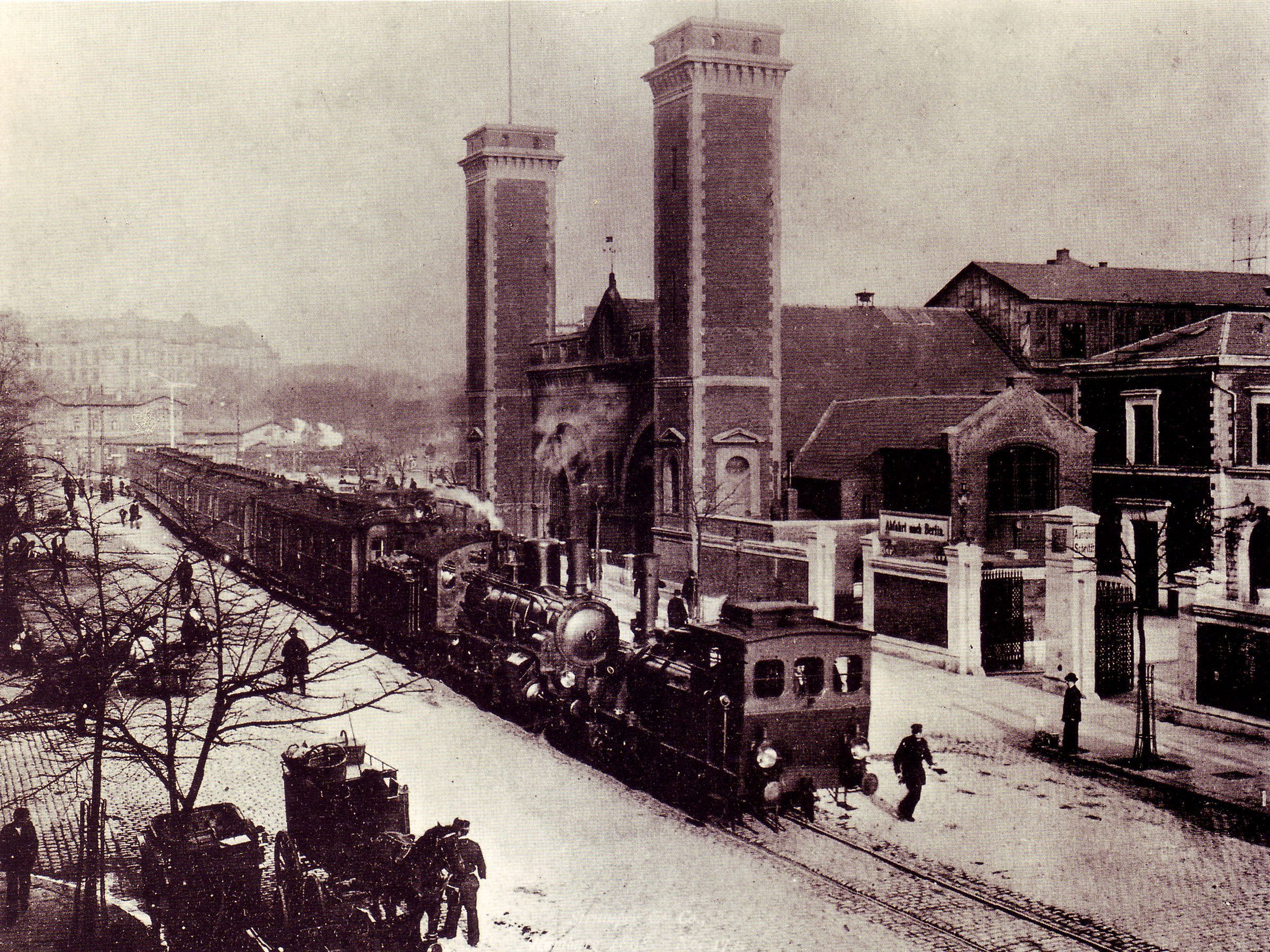
Berliner Bahnhof station; the link line to Klosterthor station is in the foreground

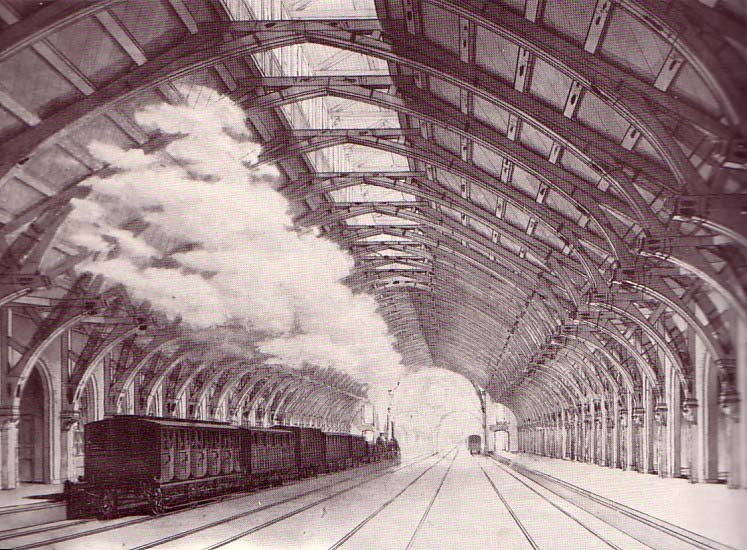
The 148 metre-long train hall in Hamburg

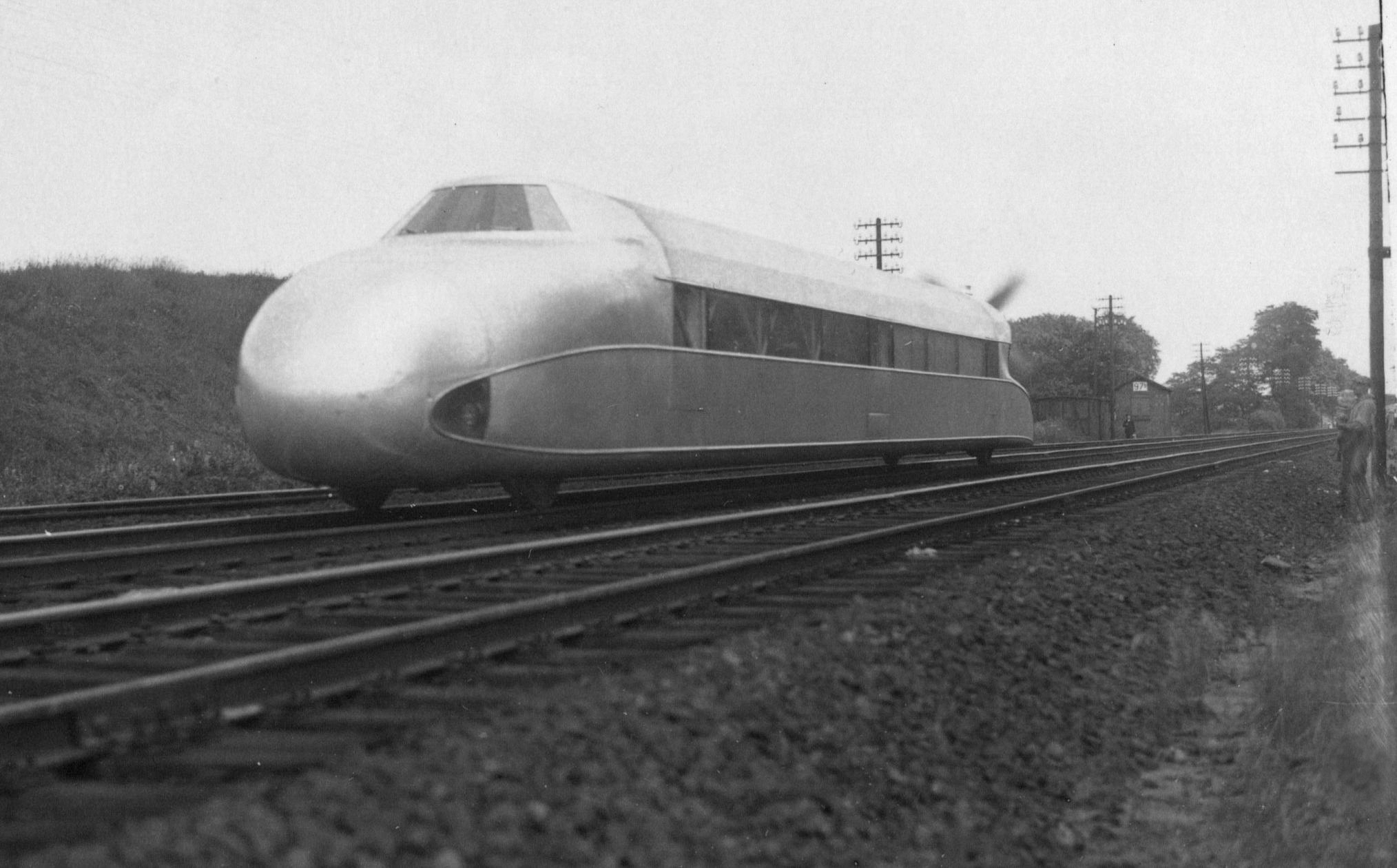
The propeller-driven Rail Zeppelin (230 km/h, 1931)

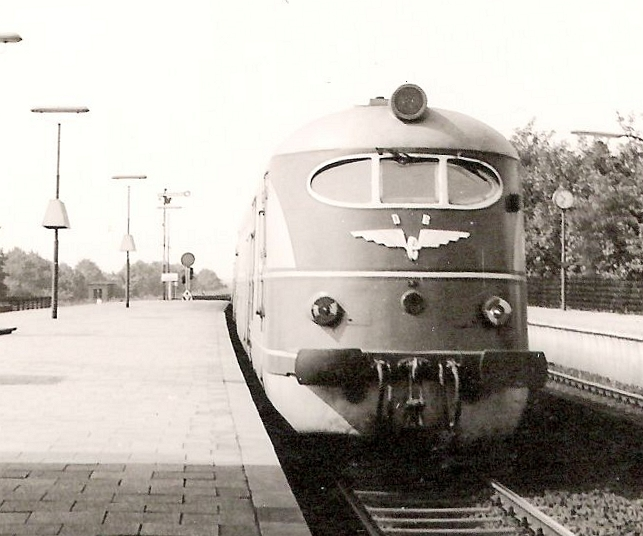
Interzone express hauled by DR VT 12.14 at Hamburg-Bergedorf in July 1959

The Berlin–Hamburg railway is a roughly 286 km (178 mi) long railway line for passenger, long-distance and goods trains. It was the first high-speed line upgraded in Germany to be capable of handling train speeds of over 200 km/h (120 mph) (up to 230 km/h).

The line was built by the Berlin-Hamburg Railway Company, work starting on 6 May 1844, and was taken into service on 15 December 1846. It was then the longest trunk route in the German states, and ran from Berlin's Hamburg station (from October 1884 from Lehrte station), via Spandau, Neustadt (Dosse), Wittenberge, Ludwigslust, Büchen and along the already existing 15.6 kilometres (9.7 mi) route of the Hamburg-Bergedorf Railway to the Berlin station in Hamburg.

== History ==
The line ran through the territories of five then independent countries within the German Confederation: the Free and Hanseatic City of Hamburg, two duchies ruled over by the King of Denmark (Holstein and Lauenburg), the Grand Duchy of Mecklenburg-Schwerin and the Kingdom of Prussia. Since Bergedorf was a condominium, jointly owned by the Free Hanseatic City of Lübeck and Hamburg, Lübeck was also affected by its construction.

On 8 November 1841, these countries jointly signed a treaty that specified the route and transit tariffs. A company was established, which obtained the rights to construct and operate the railway in these countries in 1845. The willingness of Hamburg and Mecklenburg to subscribe part of the share capital was a prerequisite for the establishment of the Berlin–Hamburg Railway Company (German: Berlin-Hamburger Eisenbahn-Gesellschaft) and the construction of the line. The first ten percent of the share capital, amounting to a total of eight million thalers, was subscribed in 1844, so that construction could start near Ludwigslust immediately. Up to 10,000 people were employed on the construction at its peak.

The first section to be opened was the 222-kilometre (138 mi) route from Berlin to Boizenburg, which was put into operation on 15 October 1846. The completion of the remaining 45-kilometre (28 mi) section to Bergedorf, on 15 December 1846, completed the line’s construction. Together with the Hamburg–Bergedorf railway, which had opened for passenger on 16 May 1842 and for freight on 28 December 1842, the total Berlin–Hamburg line was put into operation on 15 December 1846. The Hamburg-Bergedorf Railway Company merged with the Berlin–Hamburg Railway Company. In Hamburg, the Berlin station (Berliner Bahnhof) was opened on the site of the present Deichtorhallen. It consisted of a reception building and an open timber hall with four tracks.

The first managing director from 1850 was Ernst Georg Friedrich Neuhaus, who filled this office with great dedication until his death on 4 December 1876.

=== Opening ===
The first trip from Berlin to Hamburg took over nine hours. The locomotives Hansa, Concordia, Vorwärts, Germania and Amazone hauled carriages and freight wagons, including a total of 33 combined first- and second-class carriages and 43 third-class carriages, as well as a carriage for the "highest people".

In the first year, about half a million people used the new line. The shorter sections were most frequented—for example, between Berlin Spandau and Nauen, between Wittenberge and Büchen and between Hamburg and Bergedorf. Within 20 years, annual revenue had doubled to 890,000 thalers. Freight revenue rose even faster over the years, due to increasing industrialisation and the growing population of Berlin and Hamburg.

=== Integration with other rail lines and nationalisation ===
In Hamburg the Lübeck station of the Lübeck–Hamburg line was opened in 1865, 600 metres (2,000 ft) east of the Berliner station. In 1866 the Hamburg-Altona link line was opened to Klosterthor station, about 200 m (660 ft) north of the Berliner station. A line was later built from the link line to connect with the line to Berlin at the approach to the Berliner Bahnhof.

The Berlin–Hamburg Railway Company obtained a concession to build a twelve-kilometre-long (7.5 mi) branch line from Büchen to Lauenburg on the Elbe. This branch line was opened on 15 October 1851. It was extended to Lüneburg by the Royal Hanoverian State Railways in 1863 and 1864, which used the Lauenburg–Hohnstorf train ferry to cross the Elbe for 14 years from 15 March 1864.

The very profitable line was acquired by the Prussian State Railways on 1 January 1884. This allowed the tracks and railway facilities between Spandau and the Hamburger Bahnhof in Berlin to be merged bit by bit with the Berlin–Lehrte railway to the Lehrter Bahnhof. A connection from the Hamburg line at Spandau to the Berlin Stadtbahn had already opened in 1882.

=== High-speed operations and records ===
On 21 June 1931, the Schienenzeppelin (Rail Zeppelin) experimental rail car ran over the 257-kilometre (160 mi) route between Hamburg-Bergedorf and Lehrter Bahnhof in Berlin in 98 minutes. Between Karstädt and Wittenberge the train reached a top speed of 230 km/h (140 mph), which was a world record for rail vehicles that was not broken until 1955. In July 1934, the Schienenzeppelin ran for the last time on the line. It had more speed than was required at the time and its propeller propulsion created operational problems.

On 11 May 1936, high-speed steam locomotive 05 002, hauling three express carriages and a test van, reached 200.4 km/h at the 52 km mark between Vietznitz and Paulinenaue, a world record for steam locomotives.

On 15 May 1933, Germany’s first high-speed diesel train, DRG 877 Fliegender Hamburger ("Flying Hamburger"), was introduced on the line. With a travel time of two hours and 18 minutes the Fliegender Hamburger had an average speed of 123 km/h (76 mph) for the 286.8-kilometre-long Lehrter route (178.2 mi), between Hamburg Hauptbahnhof and Berlin Lehrter station. The Fliegender Hamburger was the world's fastest scheduled rail service. The majority of travellers still travelled in ordinary steam-hauled express trains with a travel time of three and a half to four hours. With the outbreak of World War II, military priorities meant that high-speed projects were abandoned.

The speed of the Fliegender Hamburger was not achieved again until 1997. In the summer timetable 2001, the normal journey time of trains was two hours and eight minutes, with some Intercity Express trains running faster. Since the completion of the upgrade of the line on 12 December 2004, the travel time has been reduced to about one and a half hours.

=== Post-war development ===
After the war the Berlin–Hamburg line was affected like many lines in by the division of Germany. A border was established between Büchen and Schwanheide, separating West Germany and East Germany, as well as between Albrechtshof and Spandau West separating West Berlin and East Berlin. In East Germany the second track was dismantled for reparations to the Soviet Union. Despite this, the line continued to an important route for internal East German trains between Berlin, Schwerin and Wismar and interzone trains (sealed trains that ran non-stop between West Germany and West Berlin), in both cases for passenger and freight trains. In the Deutsche Bundesbahn (German Federal Railways, DB) network in West Germany the line between Büchen and Schwarzenbek the second track was also dismantled. Deutsche Reichsbahn (East German railways, DR) Class 03 steam locomotives hauled interzone services to Hamburg-Altona in the 1950s and 1960s. From the summer timetable of 1973, DB and DR locomotive were exchanged in Büchen. DR operated diesel locomotives of class V 180, later 118 and 132, while DB operated Class 218 locomotives.

On the evening of 5 December 1961, a train driver Harry Deterling ran at full speed through barriers erected in Staaken on 13 August 1961 as part of the Berlin Wall to escape from East Germany. The same night the rails were disconnected there by border guards. As a result, transit trains between Berlin and Hamburg were rerouted via the Berlin outer ring and entered and exited West Berlin at Griebnitzsee. The border crossing at Albrechtshof was permanently closed. In the 1960s the journey time between the two cities had increased to more than six hours because of increased border controls, detours and single-track operations. An agreement between DB and DR limited the number of freight trains at the Inner German border at Büchen: 24 freight and five passenger trains running to the east at and 17 freight and five passenger trains running to the west. The spare capacity of the line in the Hamburg area was used for the Hamburg S-Bahn.

Before the division of Germany, there were five main rail axes running to Hamburg from all directions (from Berlin, Flensburg, Lübeck/Wismar/Rostock/Stralsund/Sassnitz, Hanover and Bremen). With the division, the Berlin–Hamburg line lost its importance, and the traffic to and from Hamburg was now concentrated mainly in the north-south direction. While the Hamburg–Hanover line was electrified in 1965 and the Hamburg–Bremen line was electrified in 1968 and both lines were later upgraded for speeds up to 200 km/h, there were no similar projects on the Berlin–Hamburg line.

In 1976 the line was re-opened from Nauen to the newly re-established border crossing at Staaken, providing a more direct line to Hamburg. In the 1970s the line between Nauen and Ludwigslust (and continuing to Schwerin on the Ludwigslust–Wismar line) was rebuilt as two tracks.

=== Suburban traffic ===
==== Berlin ====
The suburban line of the Berlin-Hamburg railway, serving Nauen, had been part of the Berlin suburban network, called the Berliner Stadt-, Ring und Vorortbahnen (Berlin City-, Circular and Suburban lines, renamed to S-Bahn in December 1930), since the original establishment of a special suburban tariff in 1891. The Nauen suburban line, together with the Wustermark suburban line, terminated at the Berlin Lehrter Bahnhof, just like the long distance trains of the same lines.

The Nauen and Wustermark lines were the only suburban lines of the Berlin S-Bahn which had not been electrified before the 2nd World War. The part from Falkensee to the Northern Ring line was electrified with Third Rail in 1951, being operational from August 14, 1951 to the end of the 1950s, thus enabling direct S-Bahn trains from East Berlin to the places being located in the GDR west of Spandau.

After the construction of Berlin Wall on 13 August 1961, this link was also severed. Falkensee and the Havelland (Berlin’s northwestern outskirts) were only connected to East Berlin by a long detour of West Berlin around the Berlin outer ring, the so-called Sputnik trains.

Today (2014), there are two local trains from Nauen via Spandau to Berlin, the RB 10 on the original course of the Nauen suburban trains, i.e. via Berlin Jungfernheide station to the current Berlin Hauptbahnhof, and the RB 14 crossing Berlin West to East via the Berlin Stadtbahn cross-city railway, and terminating at the Berlin Schönefeld Airport.

==== Hamburg ====
On the Hamburg end, an S-Bahn service was established alongside the Berlin–Hamburg line, since long distance traffic was now insignificant. The third rail supplying DC power was extended first to Bergedorf in 1959 and then to Aumühle in 1969. With the establishment of Hamburger Verkehrsverbund in 1967 this route was branded as line S2 (now S21; S2 runs between Altona and Bergedorf).

=== After the fall of the Wall ===
After the fall of the Wall on 1 August 1990 an Intercity service was established on the Berlin–Hamburg line under the name of Max Liebermann, initially with former TEE carriages hauled by DB Class 601 locomotives that were hired by DR from Italy. These operated, however, only up to 28 September. Afterwards this service was operated with DR class 132 locomotives and DB TEE/IC carriages. In 1991, four pairs of trains operated daily. From 1992, trains operated every two hours. The travel time between Berlin and Hamburg was about four hours. The first suburban trains from Nauen to Berlin originally terminated in Charlottenburg, then in Jungfernheide and later Westkreuz.

=== Renovation and upgrade for 160 km/h ===
In the early 1990s the German government was considering constructing a maglev (magnetic levitation) line between Berlin and Hamburg. During the development of Federal Transport Infrastructure Plan of 1992, two options were considered for upgrading the Berlin–Hamburg line were also considered:

- A new line between Bergedorf and Spandau, costing approximately Deutsche Mark (DM) 6 billion, with a travel of 67 minutes (with a 300 km/h speed limit), or 61 minutes (350 km/h). This option was quickly rejected on economic grounds.
- For an investment of about DM 2.4 billion, an upgrade of the existing Hamburg–Berlin line (allowing operations at up to 220 km/h) was considered in conjunction with an 83 km-long (52 mi) new line (300 km/h) between Boizenburg (near Büchen) and Kuhblank (near Wittenberge). This would avoid slow sections through Hagenow Land, Ludwigslust and Wittenberge and shorten the length by 16 km. Travel time between Hamburg and Berlin would thus fall to 82 minutes. Instead the German Government decided on 2 March 1994 to build a maglev line.

The line was included as part of the German Unity Transport Projects (Verkehrsprojekte Deutsche Einheit) as VDE Rail No. 2 in the Federal Transport Infrastructure Plan of 1992. It was planned to remodel the line with continuous double track, electrification and the installation of modern automatic train protection to allow continuous operation at 160 km/h. The upgrade started in 1991 and was planned to be completed by 1997.

On 14 July 1992 the first pile was driven for the electrification of the section of line between Ludwigslust and Büchen. The route between Falkensee and Albrechtshof was closed in 1993 to allow the complete renovation between Falkensee and Spandau. The old, ground-level Albrechtshof station was demolished and rebuilt about 80 metres away on an embankment. On 28 May 1995, the line was restored to operation. A new pair of tracks was built south of the old single-track line between Falkensee and Nauen. The tracks have been removed from the old northern route and its path has been preserved for the construction of a Berlin–Falkensee–Nauen S-Bahn line.

In May 1995, the section between Falkensee and Spandau West was reopened as a single-track line with diesel operation. The Berlin–Hamburg line was restored to almost continuous two-track operation in 1995. At the height of the construction work travel times were extended by 40 minutes to three hours and 40 minutes for the whole route. In the autumn of 1996, electric train operations started between Hamburg and Nauen, reducing travel time between Berlin and Hamburg to about 160 minutes. The whole line was operated by electric trains from 22 May 1997. At the Hamburg end a pair of parallel tracks were laid to separate long-distance and S-Bahn traffic, although east of Berliner Tor station for 2.4 km (from the 282.2 to 284.6 km marks) the second long-distance line was omitted. In order to allow traffic to and from Berlin to use platform tracks 11-14 of Hamburg Hauptbahnhof, an additional single-track line was built from Tiefstack junction via Hamburg-Rothenburgsort station over a new Upper Harbour bridge to Ericus junction (originally built for the former Hamburg freight station). From 29 May 1997 the Fliegender Hamburger Intercity Express (ICE) train took two hours and 15 minutes between Hamburg and Berlin.

Up until 1998, DM 4.5 billion (approximately €2.3 billion) had been invested in the upgrade of the line.

The upgrade was initially designed only to raise the maximum speed to 160 km/h, with an option for a further upgrade to 200 km/h. Considerations for the further upgrade was shelved in favour of the planned Transrapid magnetic levitation project. During the planning carried out between 1996 and 2000, it was envisaged that a line could be built with an investment of from 3.9 to 4.5 billion euros that would allow a journey time of less than 60 minutes (non-stop) at a maximum speed of 400 km/h. The opening would take place from 2006. This project was cancelled by Hartmut Mehdorn shortly after he took office as CEO of Deutsche Bahn in 2000.

Already before the end of 1999 Deutsche Bahn had internally prepared an alternative scenario in case in the failure of the Transrapid project. With a top speed of 200 km/h, a travel time of less than two hours would be possible, with an increase to 230 km/h, 90 minutes would be possible. This would require the elimination of nearly 70 level crossings at an estimated cost of 700 million DM (about €350 million). In May 2000 the upgrade of the line to allow 230 km/h operations for a travel time of 90 minutes was announced. At the end of 2000, the ICE service on the line was increased to three pairs of trains per day.

The upgrade of the existing line to a high-speed railway was not without controversy. A report of 1992 proposed the development of the route via Uelzen (Hanover–Hamburg line) and Stendal (Hanover–Berlin high-speed line) available for ICE trains running between Berlin and Hamburg, while freight traffic would remain on the Berlin–Hamburg line. A 1994 report on this option put its cost at less than DM one billion (about € half a billion).

=== Upgrade for 230 km/h ===
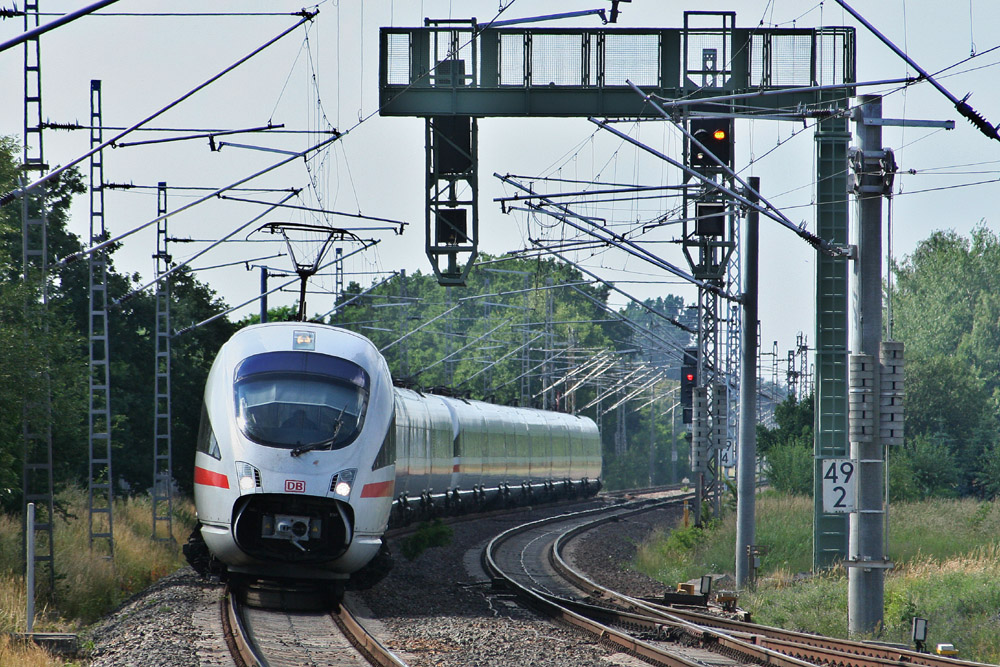
An ICE T passing through Paulinenaue

In 2000 the shortest travel time between Hamburg and Berlin was two hours and eight minutes. After the cancelling of the Transrapid project in February 2000, the federal government made a grant of DM one billion (about €511 million) for a second stage of the upgrade that would raise speeds on 263 km of the existing line from 160 to up to 230 km/h. The additional 30 km/h in comparison to the normal limit on upgraded conventional lines was necessary in order to achieve a total journey time of 90 minutes. The line became the first existing railway line in Germany to be operated at more than 200 km/h. Platform barriers were used for the first time in Germany.

Large-scale construction began in 2002. Thus a large number of level crossings were eliminated and replaced by 56 grade separated crossings. A new overhead line was also installed as well as the German Linienzugbeeinflussung train protection system and 162 sets of points were converted or replaced. This work was carried out largely during an eleven-week closure of the line in the late summer of 2003. Even Wittenberge station was extensively rebuilt to allow trains to pass through it at 160 km/h. The upgrade of the line was completed for the December 2004 timetable change. The federal government ultimately invested around €650 million in this second stage.

=== Development of the timetable and service pattern after 2004 ===
Development of travel times between Hamburg and Berlin
Year	Typical travel time
Before opening of the line	about 30 hours by stagecoach
Opening (1846)	nine hours (about 30 km/h)
1914	194 minutes
1933	138 minutes (Fliegender Hamburger)
Division of Germany (1961–1989)	about six hours
1989	243 minutes
1993	204 minutes
Winter 2000 timetable (November 2000 to June 2001)	140 minutes
Summer 2001 timetable (to September 2001)	128 minutes
Summer 2004 timetable (until December 2004)	about 140 minutes
From 12 December 2004	90–93 minutes
From 28 May 2006 (opening of Berlin Hbf)	90–96 minutes

From 1 March 2005 an additional late evening service ran from Berlin to Hamburg. The ICE train left Berlin Zoo station at 11:00 PM and reached Hamburg at 00:32 AM. This additional train was promised by Hartmut Mehdorn, the First Mayor of Hamburg, Ole von Beust, on the inaugural run, to enable citizens of Hamburg to attend an evening theatre performance in Berlin and return to Hamburg before the S-Bahn closed.

The 2007 timetable includes hourly services with ICE (mostly ICE T) trains on the line. Intercity and EuroCity services have also been increased. There are also Regional-Express services on the Berlin–Wittenberge–Schwerin and Rostock–Schwerin–Büchen–Hamburg routes. In the vicinity of Berlin and Hamburg there are additional Regionalbahn services. Freight trains also run on the line.

With the timetable change in December 2006, the hourly Hamburg–Berlin ICE service was extended to the south (Leipzig, Nuremberg and Munich). Since December 2007, every two hours an ICE 1, instead of an ICE T, runs between Berlin and Hamburg.

=== Increase of passengers ===
At the beginning of ICE operations in 1997 daily traffic was about 6,000 passengers. According to the DB in May 2007, about 10,000 travelers a day moved between the two cities. This is an increase of 47 percent, according to DB.

In the late 1990s, material defects were discovered in a number of concrete sleepers on the line. Certain elements in the sleepers decomposed faster than planned, leading to the replacement of 260,000 damaged sleepers, forcing the closure on the line between 1 March and 13 June 2009. Long-distance trains were diverted via Stendal and Uelzen and regional services were largely replaced by buses.

=== Major renovations in 2025-26 ===
From 1 August 2025 to 15 May 2026, the entirety of the Hamburger Bahn was closed to allow for the reconstruction of tracks and rebuilding of stations to allow for barrier-free access. Long-distance services ran between Berlin and Hamburg via the Berlin–Lehrte railway, the Stendal–Uelzen railway, and the Hanover–Hamburg railway, while local services were temporarily replaced with buses. Services from Hamburg to Hagenow re-opened on 15 May, and the entire line was re-opened on 14 June 2026. The total reconstruction cost €2.5 billion.

=== Prospects ===
It is currently planned for S-Bahn services to be extended from Berlin-Spandau at least as far as Falkensee, including the restoration of S-Bahn services to Albrechtshof; Regionalbahn services would be closed.

== Technical equipment and special features ==
=== Train protection ===
The section of the line from the 16.5 to 271.0 km marks is equipped with the Linienzugbeeinflussung (LZB) train protection system. Drivers receive "electronic vision" of the line up to 10,000 metres ahead.

=== Track ===
In 1993, a test section of slab track of the Züblin type was installed Between Wittenberg and Dergenthin (129.3 to 135.4 km). In 1994, a modified Rheda type slab track was installed. Also in the section between Breddin and Glöwen (93 to about 101 km) slab track was established. Along the route 13 hot wheel and hot box detectors were also installed.

=== Platform security ===
Since trains can pass station platforms at speeds of more than 200 km/h, for the first time in Germany passenger safety fences were installed along 33 platform edges at 21 stations. Each is a 4.8-metre-long (16 ft) and 1.2-metre-high (4 ft) barrier with a 1.2-metre-wide (3.9 ft) gate that opens to give access to the platform. Bilingual (German and English) signs tell passengers to leave the platform edge. On the opposite side of the fence passengers are warned not to enter the platform before a train has passed by or comes to a halt.

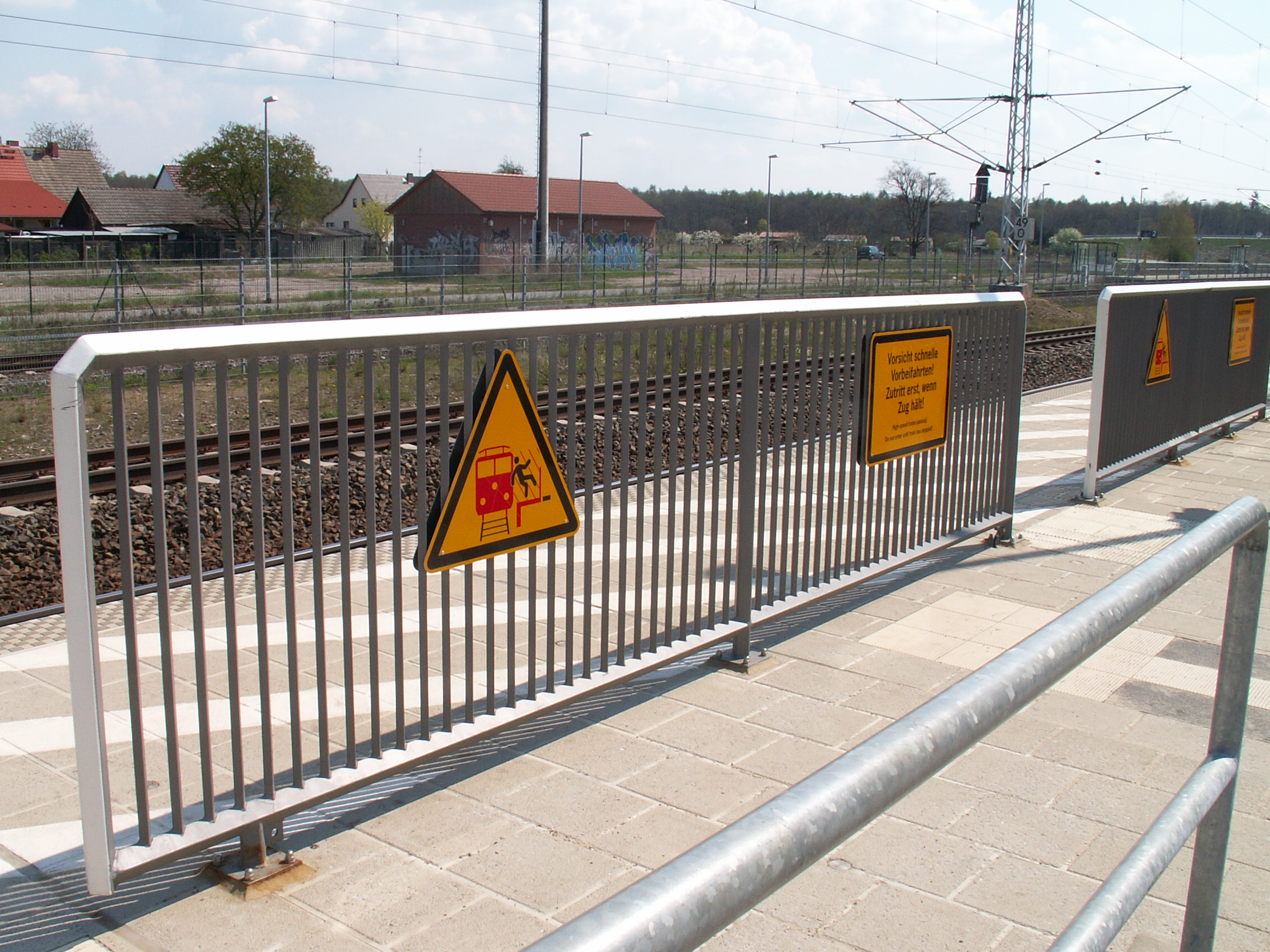
Locking barrier in Paulinenaue station

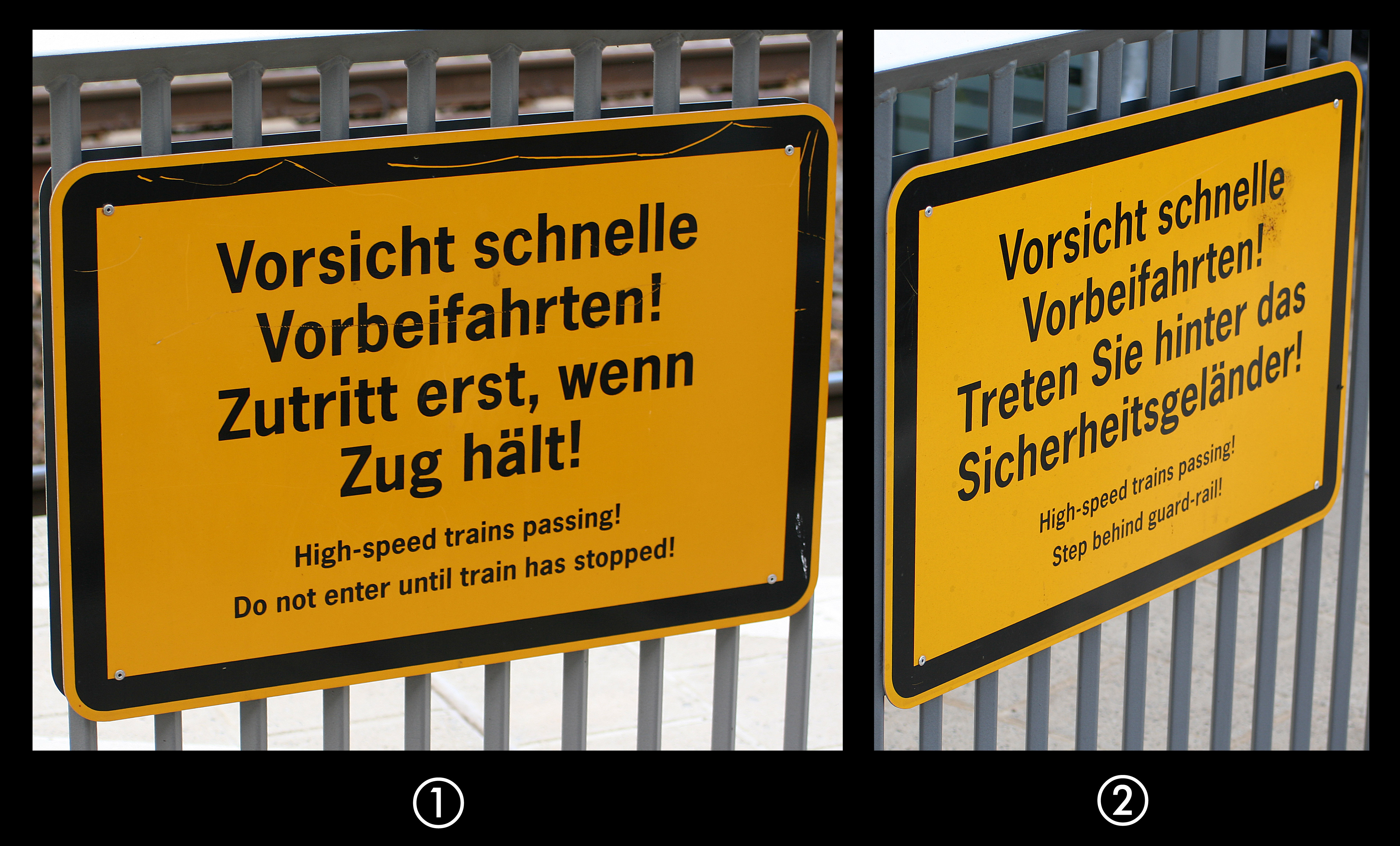
Signs at Paulinenaue station. Sign 1 faces safe side, sign 2 is on the track side of barrier, where passengers are not permitted while trains are running past.

== Sources ==
=== References ===
- Von der Leyden, ed. (1985). Berlin und seine Eisenbahnen 1846–1896. Reprint of 1896 edition, 2 volumes (in German). Berlin: Ästhetik und Kommunikation Verlags-GmbH. ISBN 3-88245-106-8.
- Bley, Peter (1996). 150 Jahre Eisenbahn Berlin-Hamburg (in German). Düsseldorf: alba. ISBN 3-87094-229-0.
- Gottwald, Peter Alfred (1996). "Die Berlin-Hamburger Eisenbahn und ihre Bahnhöfe". Brandenburgische Denkmalpflege (in German). 5 (1).
- Feldwisch, Eberhard Jänsch (Schriftleitung), Peter Wolfgang (2005). Ausbaustrecke Hamburg-Berlin für 230 km/h (Edition ETR) (in German). Hamburg: DVV Media Group GmbH. ISBN 3-7771-0332-2.
- Hoyer, Peter Hermann; Lawrenz, Dierk; Wiesmüller, Benno (2006). Hamburg Hauptbahnhof (in German). Freiburg: EK-Verlag GmbH. ISBN 3-88255-721-4.
