= Borsig locomotive works =

Borsig locomotive works can refer to:

- The August Borsig Lokomotiv-Werke in Tegel, Berlin owned by August Borsig (before the 1930s)
- The Borsig Lokomotiv Werke owned by AEG (after the early 1930s)
