= DR Class 250 =

German electric locomotive class

Deutsche Reichsbahn Baureihe 250 (Deutsche Bahn Baureihe 155)
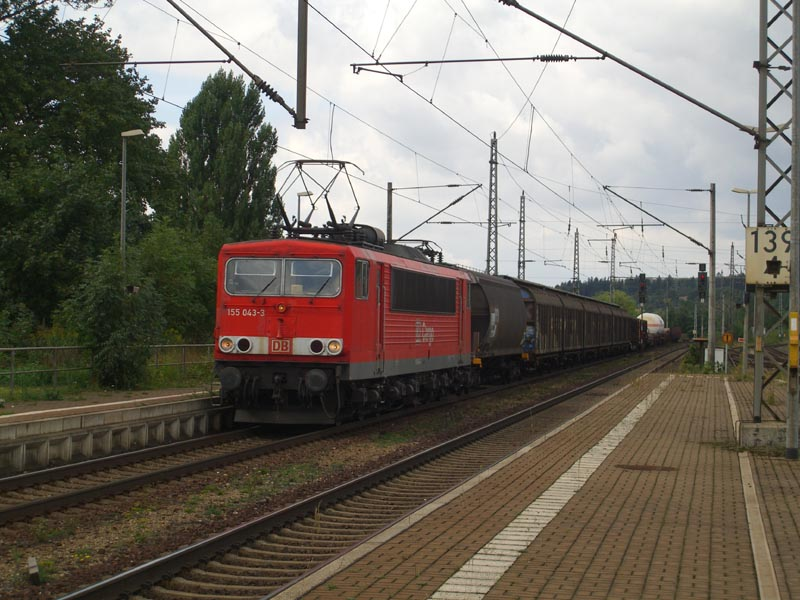
- 155 043-3 hauling a freight train through Leinefelde/Thuringia.
Type and origin
- Power type: Electric
- Builder: LEW Hennigsdorf
- Build date: 1977–1984
- Total produced: 273
Specifications
- Configuration
  - UIC: Co′Co′
- Gauge: 1,435 mm (4 ft 8 1/2 in)
- Length: 19.6 m (64 ft 4 in)
- Loco weight: 123.0 t (121.1 long tons; 135.6 short tons)
- Electric system/s: 15 kV 16.67 Hz AC overhead
- Current pickup: Pantograph
- Traction motors: Six
- Loco brake: Knorr airbrake / regenerative
- Train brakes: Knorr airbrake
- Safety systems: Sifa / PZB / LZB / ETCS
Performance figures
- Maximum speed: 120 km/h (75 mph)
- Power output: 5,400 kW (7,200 hp)
- Tractive effort: 380 kN (85,000 lbf)
Career
- Operators: Deutsche Reichsbahn; Deutsche Bahn AG; PRESS
- Class: DR: Baureihe 250; DB: Baureihe 155
- First run: 1974
- Last run: Still in service

The Deutsche Reichsbahn (East Germany) Class 250 (known since 1992 as Deutsche Bahn AG Class 155) is a German electric locomotive used on freight trains. It is nicknamed the "Electric Container" or "Powercontainer" due to its distinctive carbody shape. It was the most powerful locomotive in the former GDR and is still in use with Deutsche Bahn AG.

== History ==
In the mid-1960s, it became apparent that engine classes 211 and 242, in production since 1961, were not powerful enough, so DR built a new, 6-axled, electric locomotive suitable for all classes of traffic. In 1974 three prototypes were built by LEW Hennigsdorf, the leading builder of railway locomotives in the GDR. A series of 270 locomotives were delivered between 1977 and 1984. They were mainly used for heavy cargo trains as well as the fast Städteexpress-train services of DR (comparable with InterCity).

After the reunification of Germany, railway traffic in East Germany slumped. The locomotives were renumbered as class 155, and many of them also operated in West Germany. After Deutsche Bahn was restructured, the engines were assigned to DB Cargo (later Railion, now DB Schenker Rail) for freight services. Since 1998, some locomotives have been used for spare parts. Approximately 200 are still in existence and can be seen throughout Germany pulling all sorts of freight trains. Today the 155s remain indispensable for DB Schenker, Deutsche Bahn's railway cargo carrier.

== Construction ==
Driver's desk of class 155

The locomotives have a Co′Co′ arrangement with two 3-axled bogies. Each axle is powered by a single-phase, series-wound, AC traction motor. The torque is transferred by a double-sided spur gear to a hollow shaft, and by an elastic rubber cone flange to the wheels. Each motor has an own cooling blower. Two scissor-shaped pantographs collect the current of 15 kV / 16.7 Hz from the catenary. Recently, many of these pick-ups have been refitted as modern single-arm pantographs.

The core of the electric system is the 3-blade main transformer with oil-cooling. The control unit has 30 power notches, semi-automatic in operation. The settings are thyristor controlled and the thyristor voltage is regulated by phase cutting, which was a novelty for series locomotives in the GDR. All units are equipped with a catenary-current-controlled electric brake. The safety equipment in the driver's cab has an electronic deadman's brake (Sifa), “punctiform” automatic train controls (PZB 90), and train radio equipment with GSM-R communication. Relatively recently, computers were added for the electronic timetable EBuLa.

Some of the models have been equipped with the LZB System. Recently, these are used to haul heavy and fast container trains on the German high-speed network.

== Gallery ==
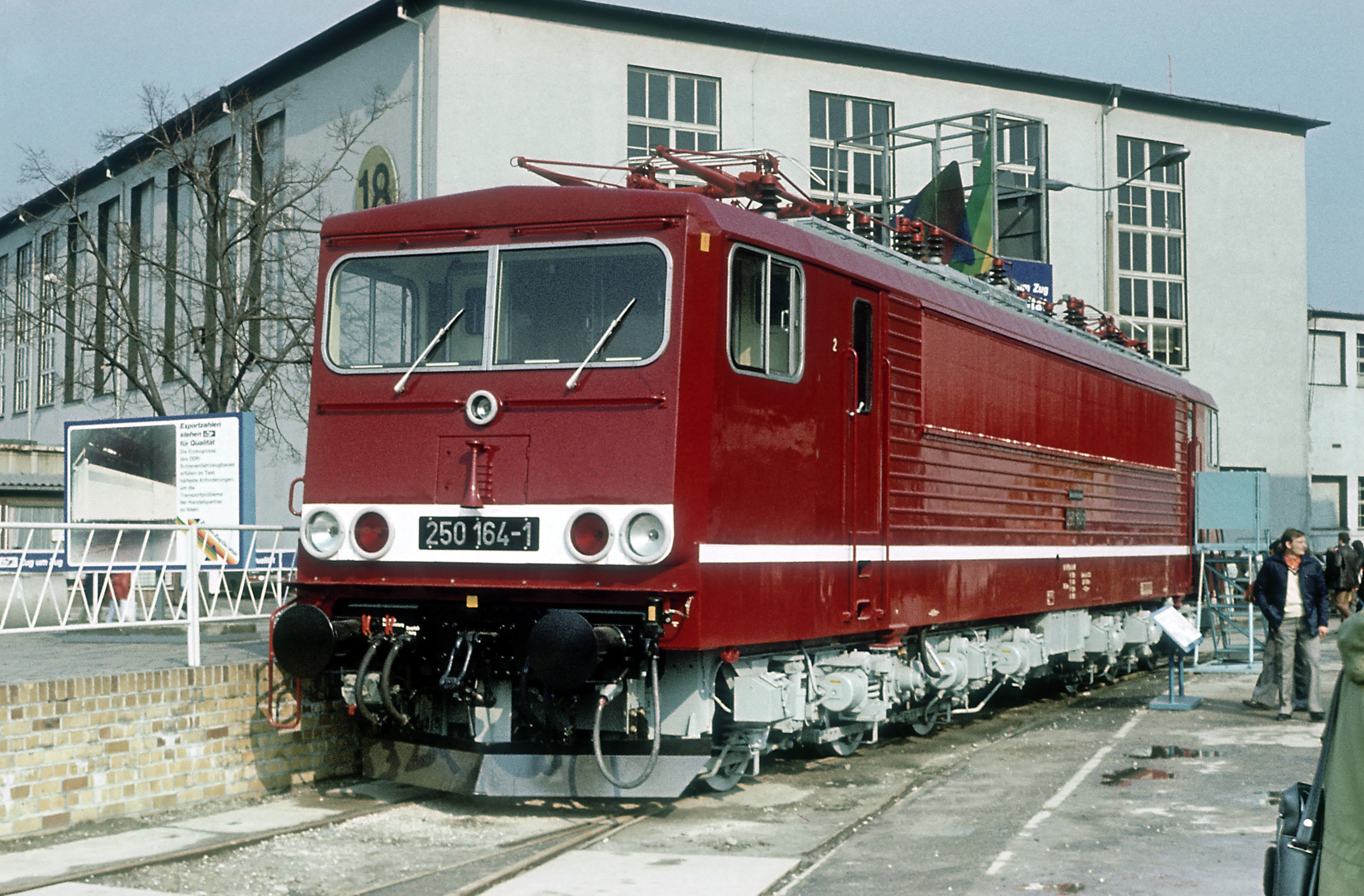
250 164-1 staying at Leipzig Trade Fair, 1982

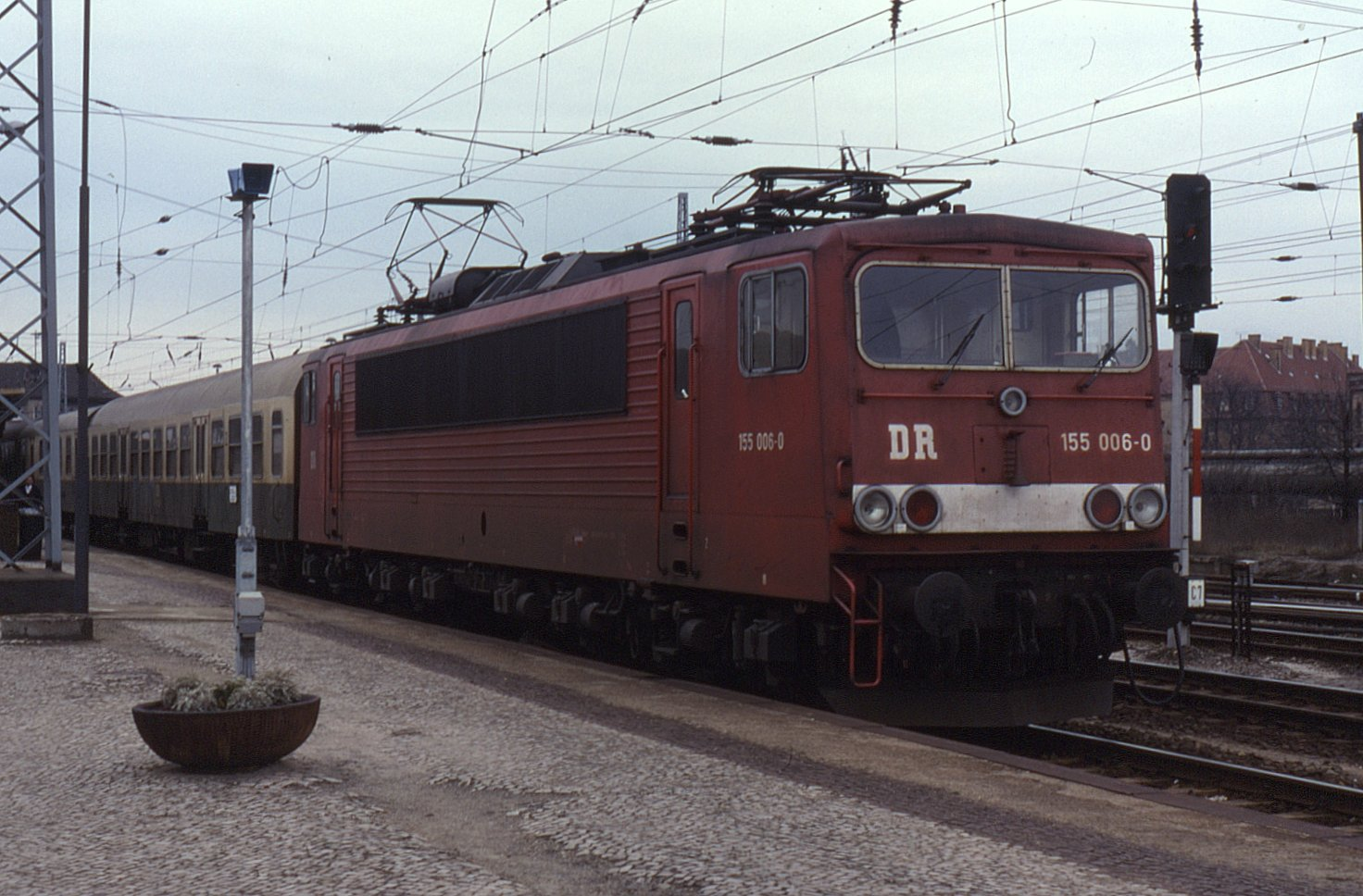
155 006–0 at Senftenberg, 1994

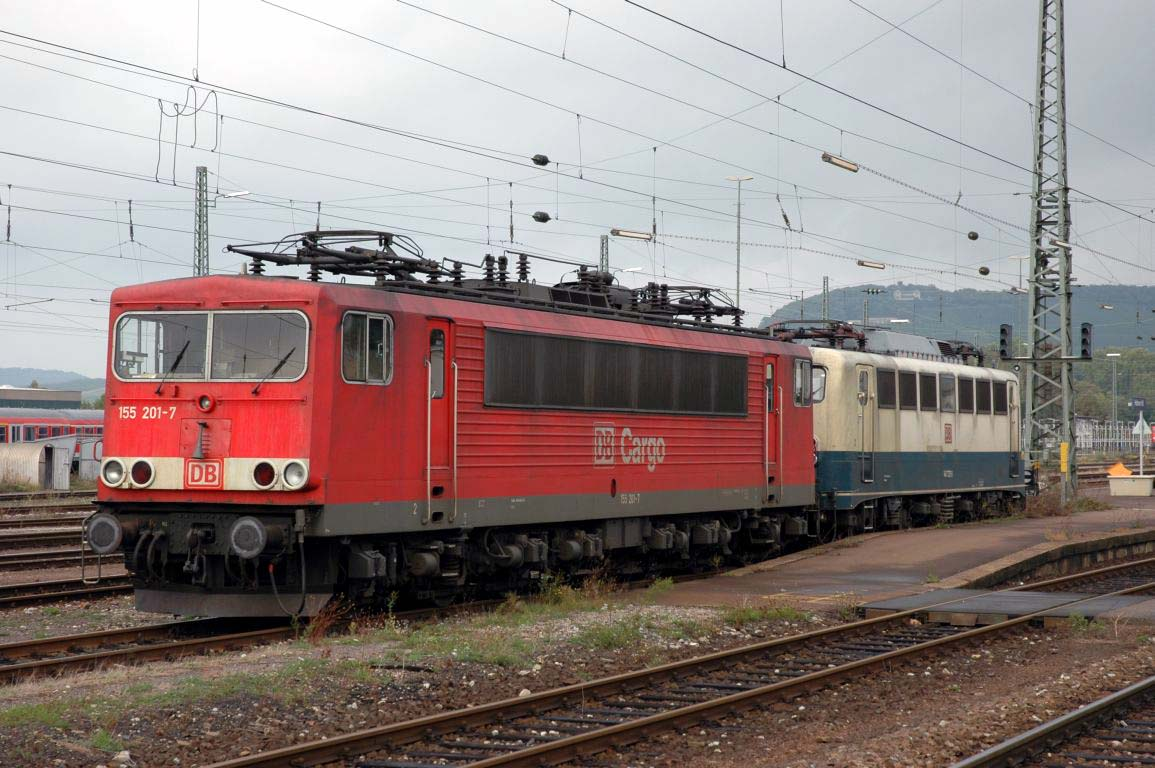
155 201–7 at Heilbronn Hauptbahnhof, 2005

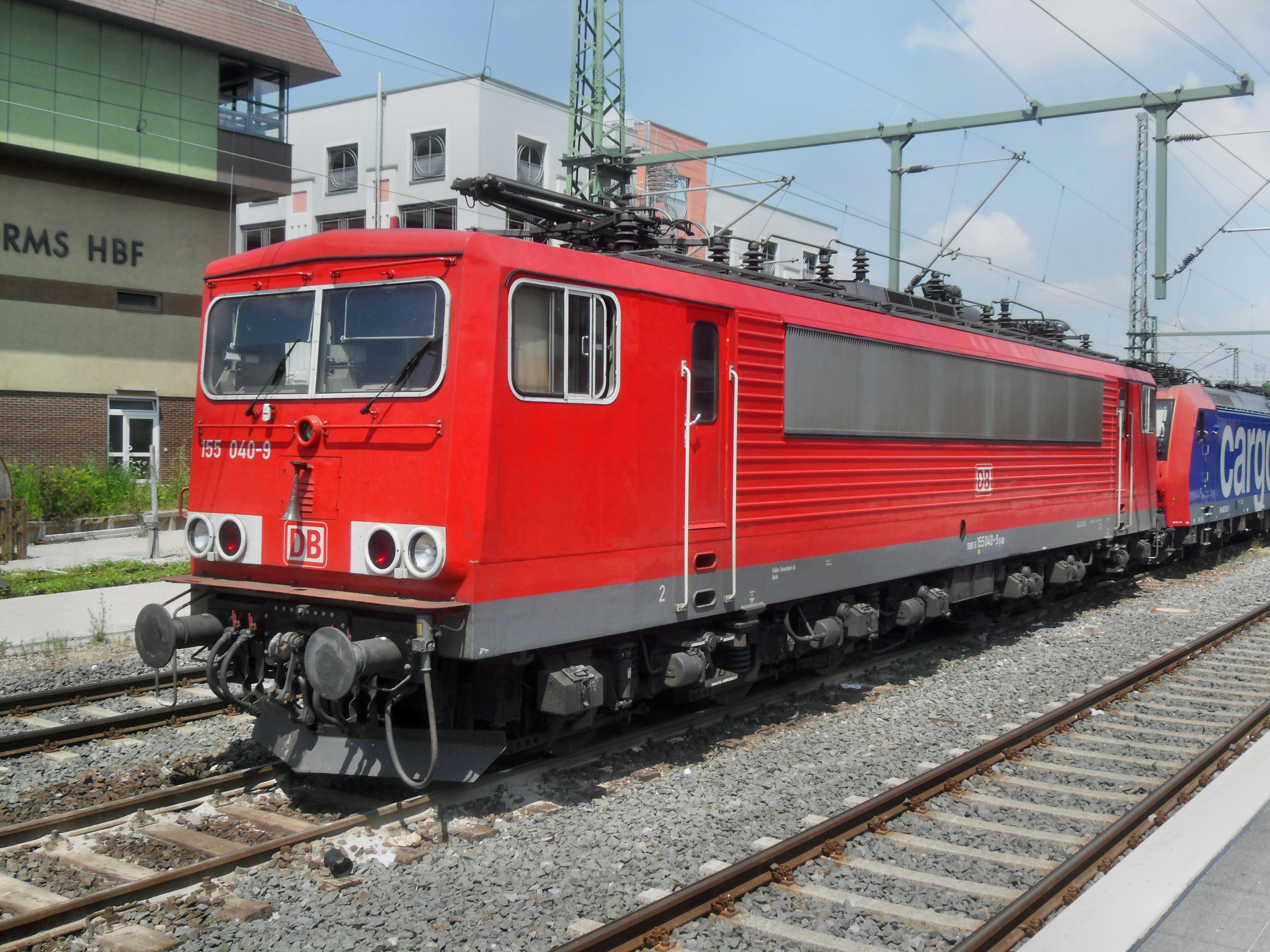
155 040–9 at Worms Hauptbahnhof, 2009

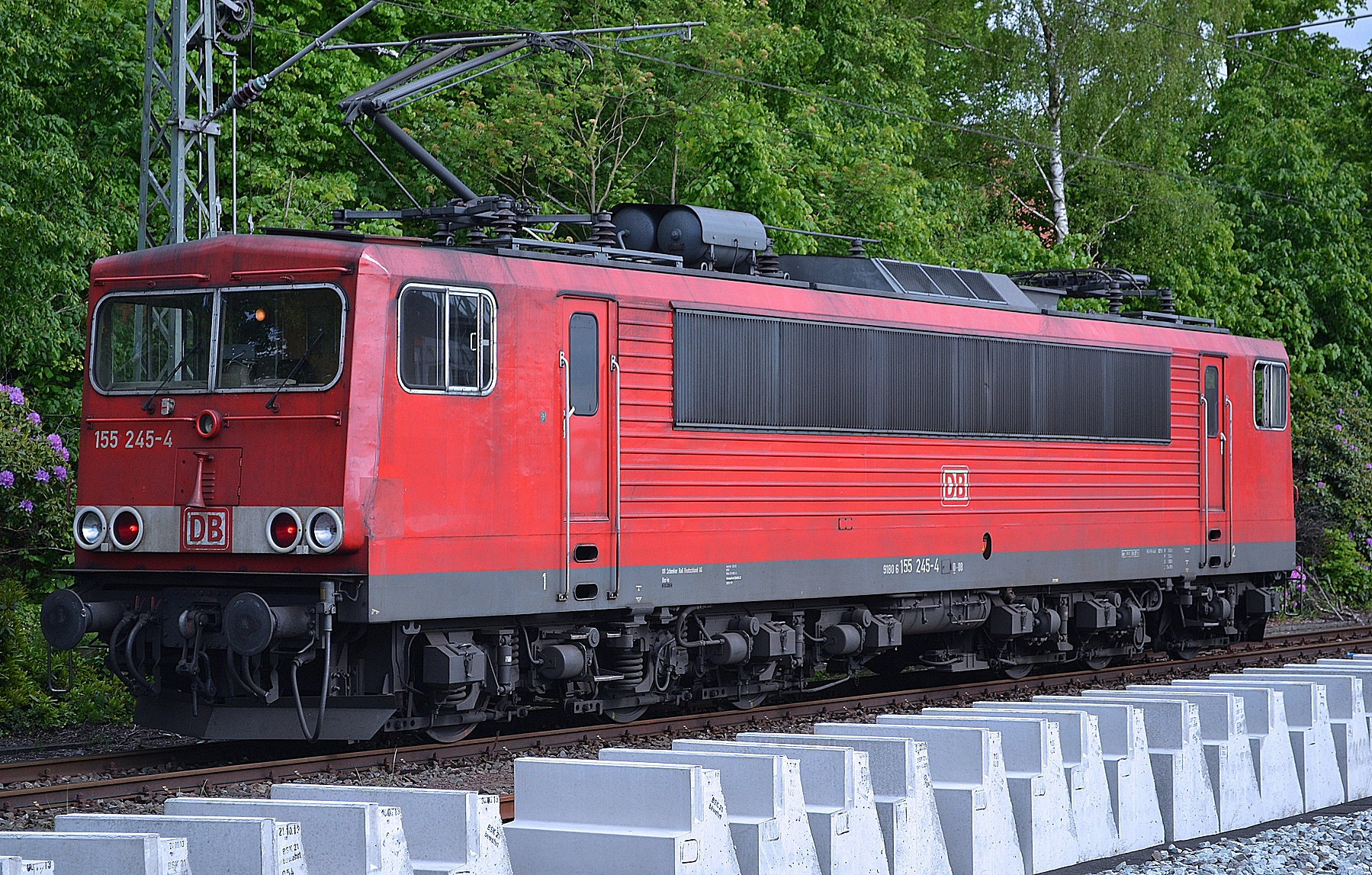
155 245–4, 2014

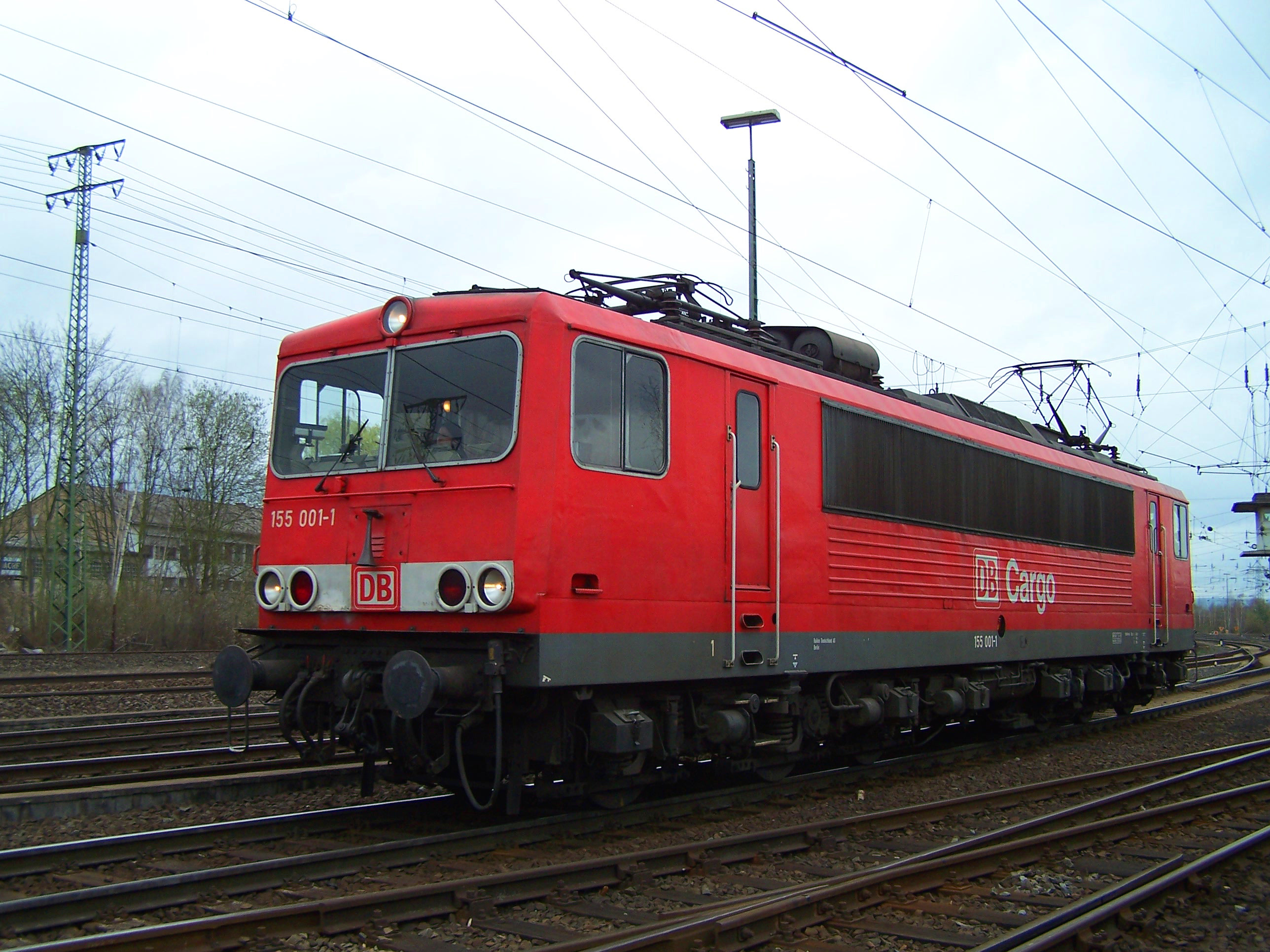
155 001–1 at DB Museum, Koblenz, 2010
