= Borsig Lokomotiv Werke =

Borsig Lokomotiv Werke can refer to:

- The August Borsig Lokomotiv-Werke based in Tegel, Germany, part of Borsig AG founded by August Borsig
- The Borsig Lokomotiv Werke GmbH based in Hennigsdorf, Germany owned by AEG after merger with Borsig AG
