= EL21 =

Electric locomotive

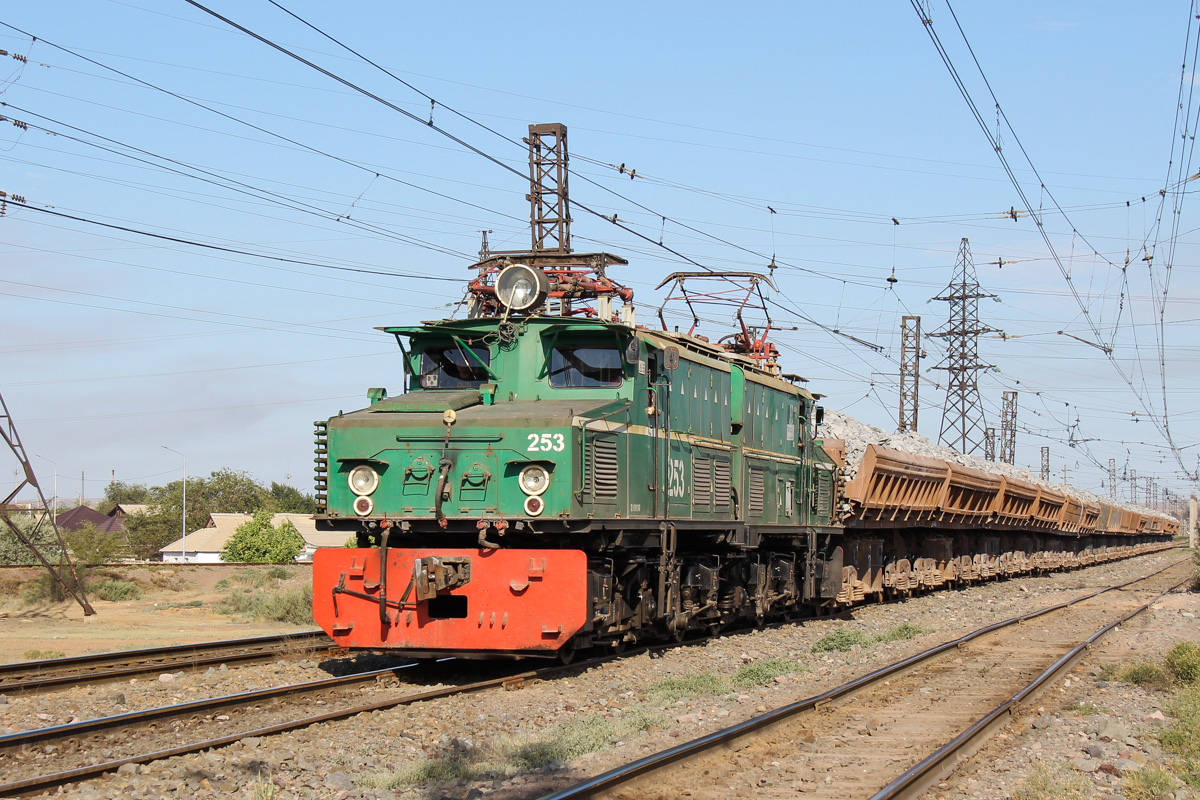
- EL21 locomotive number 253
Type and origin
- Power type: Electric
- Builder: LEW Hennigsdorf
- Build date: 1981-1986
- Total produced: 265
Specifications
- Configuration
  - UIC: Bo′+Bo′+Bo′
- Gauge: 1,520 mm (4 ft 11 27/32 in) Russian gauge
- Wheel diameter: 1,120 mm (44.09 in)
- Loco weight: 160 tonnes
- Electric system/s: 1.5 kV DC Catenary
- Current pickup: Pantograph
- Traction motors: 6 x 350 kW
- Transmission: Gear ratio 1:5.58
Performance figures
- Maximum speed: 65 km/h (40 mph)
- Power output: 2,100 kW
- Tractive effort: 237 kN

EL21 is an electric locomotive produced in the years 1981-1986 by LEW Hennigsdorf for industrial railways. Two hundred and sixty five were built for mining railways in the Soviet Union.
