= DR Class 243 =

Class of electric locomotives

Deutsche Reichsbahn Class 243 Deutsche Bahn Class 143
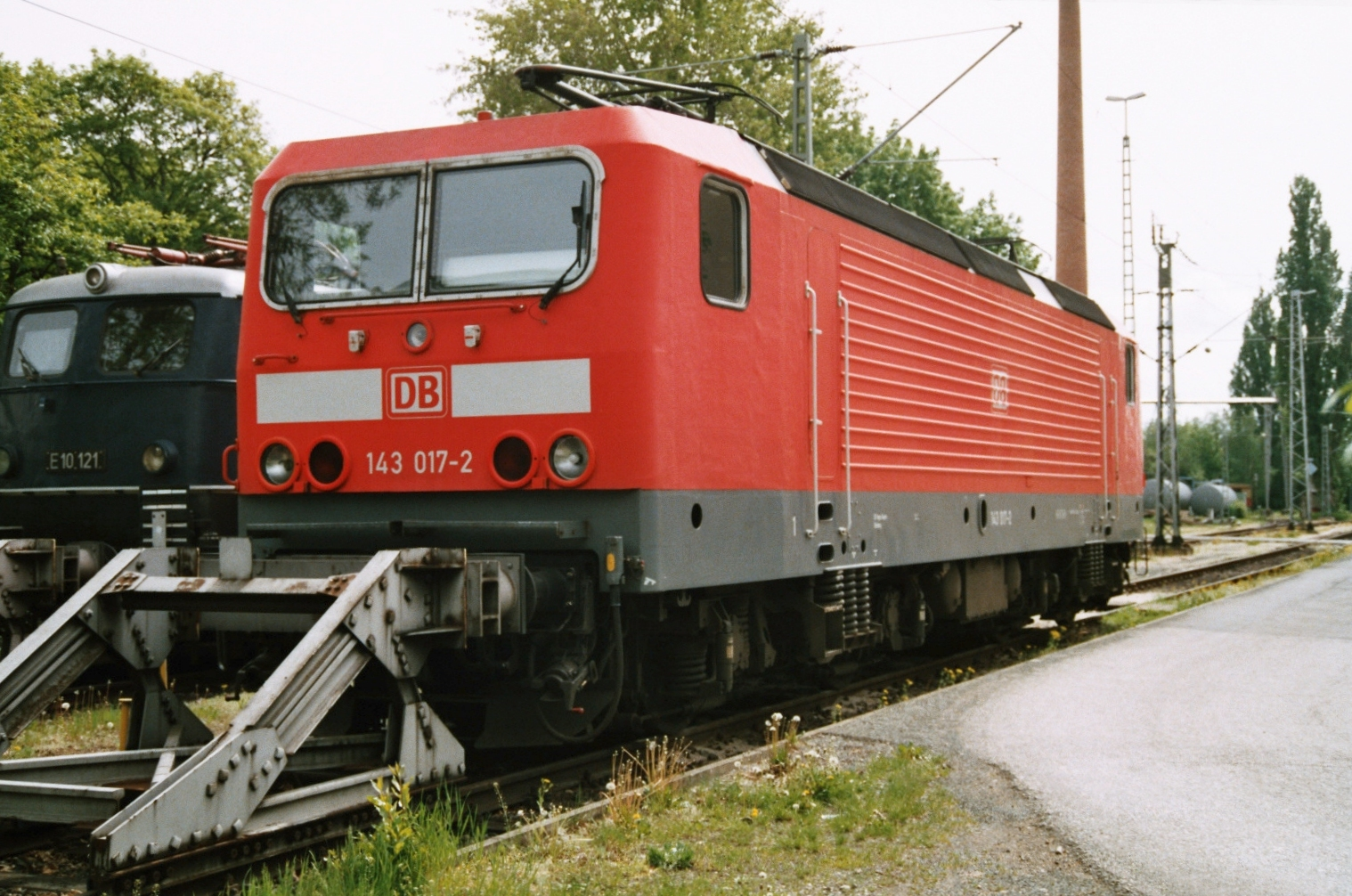
- Locomotive 143 017-2 in Nürnberg
Type and origin
- Power type: Electric
- Builder: LEW Hennigsdorf
- Build date: 1982 (prototype); 1984-1991
- Total produced: 646
Specifications
- Configuration
  - UIC: Bo′Bo′
- Gauge: 1,435 mm (4 ft 8 1/2 in)
- Wheel diameter: 1.250 m (4 ft 1.2 in) (new)
- Wheelbase: 3.300 m (10 ft 9.9 in)
- Pivot centres: 8.500 m (27 ft 10.6 in)
- Length: Over body: 15.440 m (50 ft 7.9 in); Over buffers: 16.640 m (54 ft 7.1 in)
- Width: 3.120 m (10 ft 2.8 in)
- Height
  - Body height: 3.980 m (13 ft 0.7 in)
- Axle load: 21 t (21 LT; 23 ST)
- Loco weight: 82.5 t (81.2 LT; 90.9 ST)
- Electric system/s: 15 kV 16.7 Hz overhead line
- Current pickup: Pantograph
- Traction motors: Four
- Gear ratio: 1:2.72
- Loco brake: KE-GPR-E + ep // Knorr air brakes and electric resistance brake
- Safety systems: Sifa / PZB / LZB
Performance figures
- Maximum speed: 120 km/h (75 mph)
- Power output: 3,720 kW (4,990 hp)
- Tractive effort
  - Starting: 248 kN (56,000 lb_{f})
  - 1 hour: 128 kN (29,000 lb_{f})
Career
- Class: DR: 243; DB: 143
- First run: 1985
- Last run: Still in active service - first 11 withdrawn in 2008

The DR Class 243 is a universal electric locomotive of the Deutsche Reichsbahn which is used for general rail service. Deutsche Bahn lists the locomotive as Class 143. The locomotives of class 143/243 still belong to the most successful class of German electric locomotives.

== Development ==
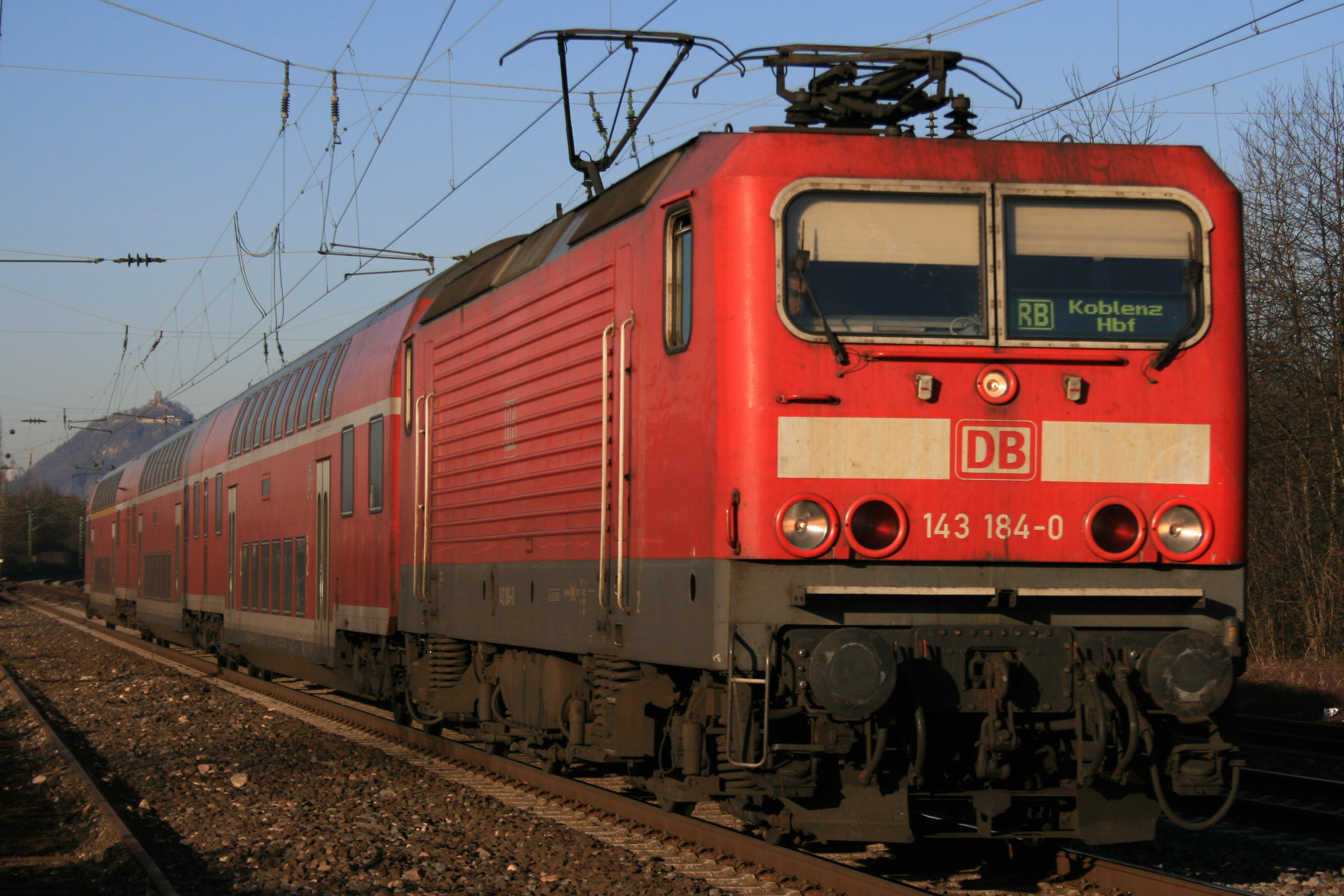
143 184-0 near Unkel

Beginning in 1976, the Deutsche Reichsbahn recommenced their railway electrification efforts in the wake of the 1973 oil crisis, which had also affected the Eastern Bloc countries. Prior to this, Deutsche Reichsbahn had mainly acquired Russian-built diesel locomotives, such as the class 120 and the DR Class 130 family, as the Soviet Union had been providing the GDR with inexpensive heavy oil and diesel fuel. VEB Lokomotivbau und Elektrotechnische Werke Hennigsdorf, the only manufacturer of electric locomotives left in the GDR, was subsequently ordered to develop a modern lightweight, eight-wheel electric locomotive for both passenger and medium freight services, which was to be based on the heavy DR Class 250 Co'Co' freight locomotives. The bodywork and other mechanical components were developed and built at LEW's Hennigsdorf works, while the traction motors and other electric equipment were manufactured by EMW Dresden and various other producers.

The prototype for this new locomotive type was designated 212 001. It was built in 1982 and first presented at the Leipzig Trade Fair that year. As built, the locomotive was capable of a maximum speed of 140 kilometres per hour (87 mph). It underwent extensive route trials before being disassembled for evaluation purposes, and while being reassembled was modified for a lower top speed of 120 km/h (75 mph), which had been specified for all following production locomotives. At this time, the locomotive was redesignated 243 001. Owing to its special livery of white with crimson stripes, 243 001 was given the nickname Weiße Lady (White Lady). Production of the new class began in 1985 after 243 001 had proven satisfactory during her trial period.

== Series Production ==
=== DR Class 243 ===
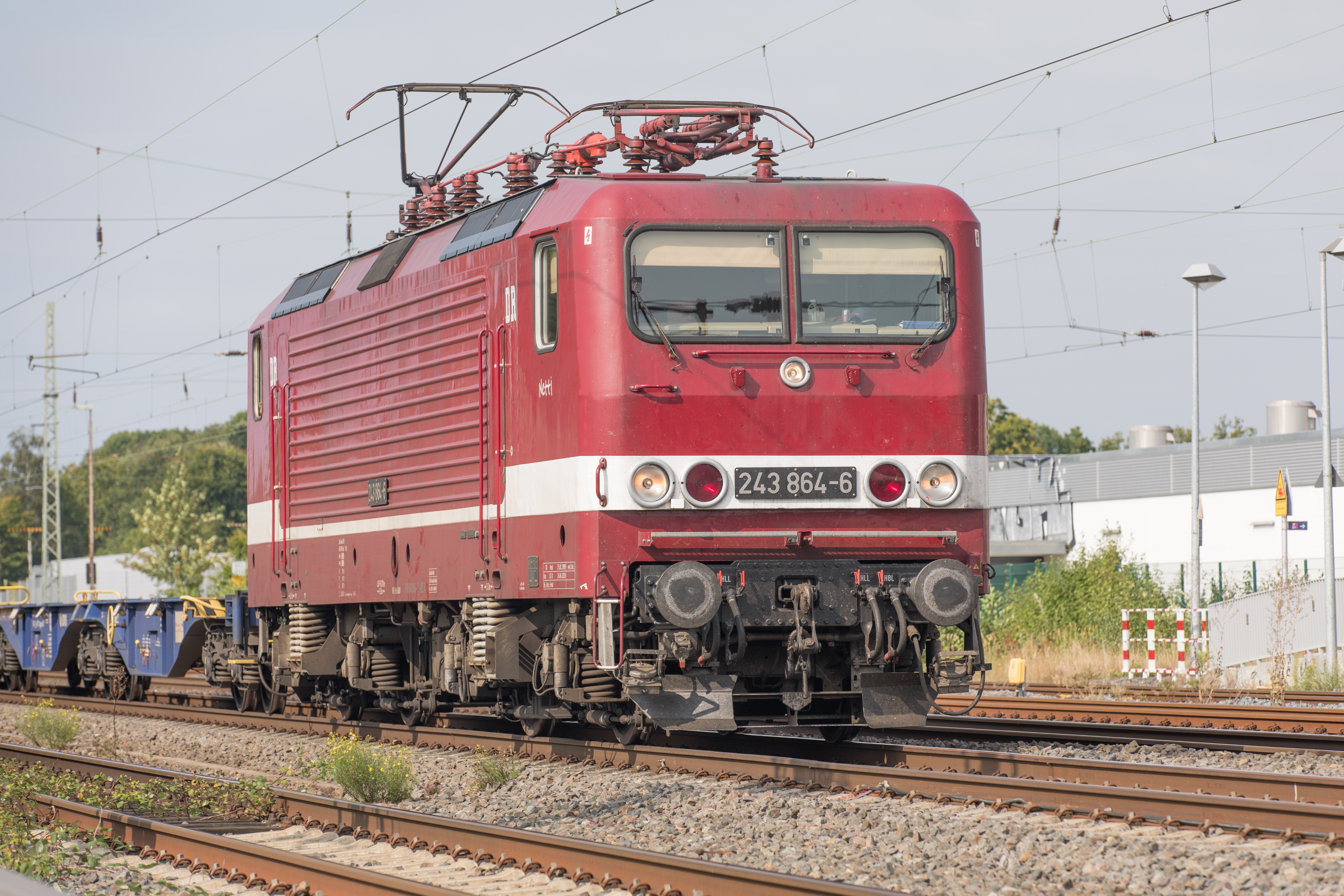
243 864, owned by Deltarail has been repainted in its original Deutsche Reichsbahn livery (August 2024)

In the 1980s, few lines on the East German railway network were prepared for speeds exceeding 120 kilometres per hour (75 mph), which had been the principal reason for Deutsche Reichsbahn having specified 120 km/h to be the top speed for their Class 243 locomotives. In 1984, the first batch of 20 locomotives was delivered, followed by 80 in 1985, 100 in 1986, 110 in 1987 and 114 in 1988. By the end of 1989, five hundred locomotives had been completed. From the factory, the DR locomotives were painted dark red with a white stripe. Locomotives operated by DB subsidiaries are painted in verkehrsrot, a brighter shade of red.

Beginning with 143 302, all locomotives built from 1987 onwards have a slightly redesigned body with slightly more streamlined cab sections, reducing energy consumption by about 5% due to reduced drag.

From 1988 onwards, the batch known as Class 243.8 was fitted with multiple-unit train control equipment. After these had been delivered, a further 109 locomotives without multiple unit train control were delivered till December 1990, resulting in Deutsche Reichsbahn having a fleet of 636 Class 243 locomotives at their disposal. 243 659 was the very last Class 243 locomotive to be commissioned, entering service on 2 January 1991.

Following German reunification, freight traffic in the former East Germany saw a sharp downturn, leading to large numbers of locomotives being put into preserved storage. Beginning in August 1990, 243 922 (later redesignated 143 922) was thus hired to the Südostbahn (Swiss South-Eastern Railway). Also, increasing numbers of 243s were reallocated to Freiburg and Düsseldorf for testing by Deutsche Bundesbahn.

=== DBAG Class 143 ===
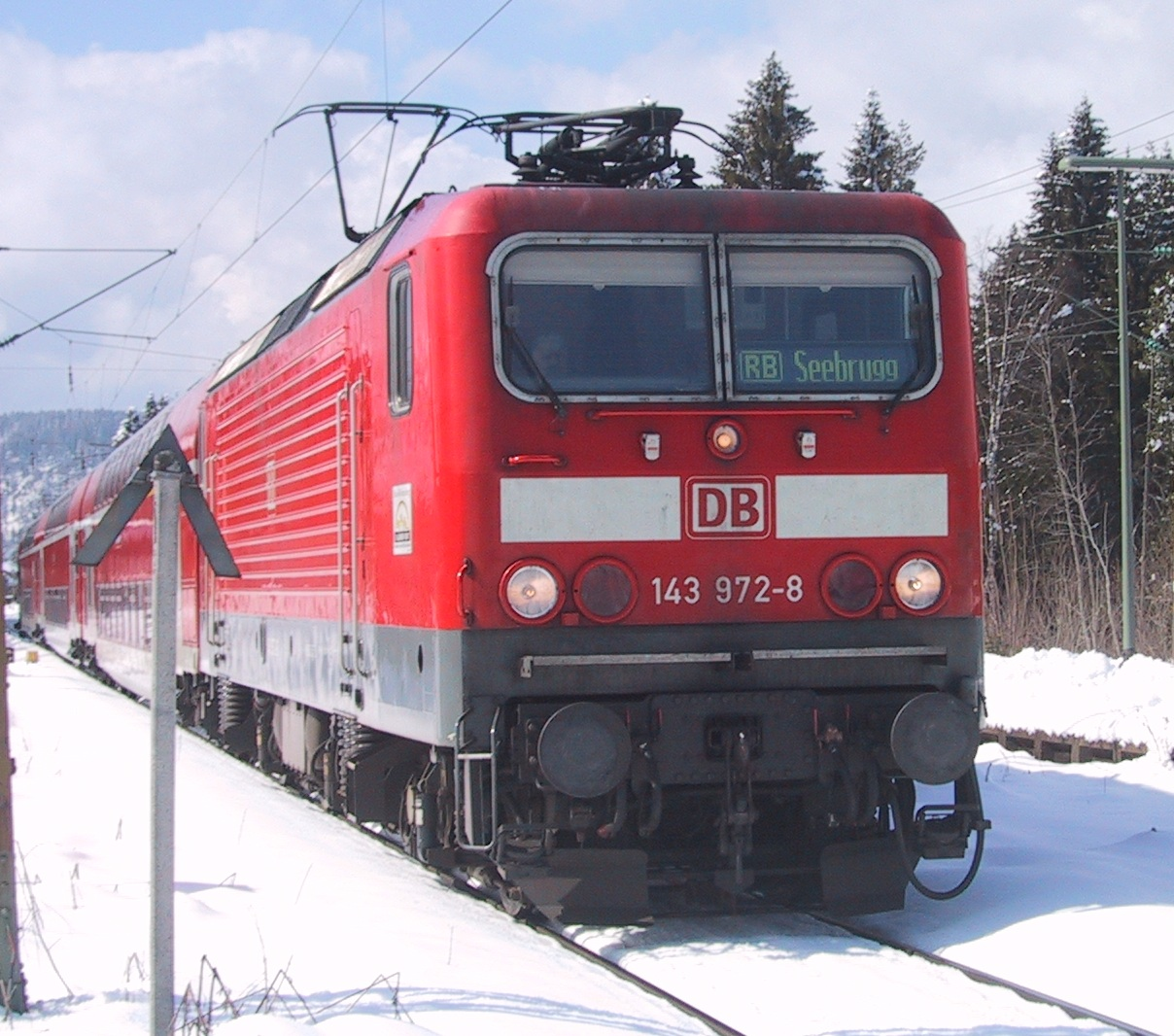
143 972 on the Höllentalbahn

The following year more locomotives were moved to the west where they were used on the Schwarzwaldbahn, the Höllentalbahn, the Rhein-Ruhr S-Bahn and goods trains from Dortmund. After the DB and DR were combined in 1994 to form Deutsche Bahn AG the Class 143 locomotives were used on many more lines in the former West Germany.

The former 212 001 remained the property of LEW and after testing by the DR from 1982 to 1984 was used for various measuring and experimental tasks. In 2002 it was sold to EKO-Trans and (now numbered 143 001) was painted in their red and silver livery. In May 2008 143 001 was repainted orange with the logo of its new owner, ArcelorMittal.

Six Class 143 locomotives (041, 069, 186, 191, 286, 874) have been sold to Bahn- und Hafenbetriebe der Ruhrkohle AG and a further six (179, 204, 257, 344, 851, 864) to Mitteldeutsche Eisenbahn Gesellschaft (MEG) where they have been renumbered as MEG 601–606.

=== DBAG Class 114.1 and 114.3 ===
Many Class 143 locomotives were in use for passenger traffic and on longer Regionalbahn and Regional-Express services, so the maximum speed of 120 km/h (75 mph) was awkward, especially as the carriages often had a maximum speed of 140 or 160 km/h (87 or 99 mph). It was planned to rebuild some locomotives with higher maximum speeds of 140 and 160 km/h (87 and 99 mph), which would be classified as Class 114.3 and Class 114.1 respectively.

143 171 was rebuilt with a maximum speed of 160 km/h (99 mph) and renumbered as 114 101. During the rebuilding the pantograph was replaced with a newer model of type SSS 87 and the train protection system and brake equipment were adapted for higher speeds. The gear ratio between the motors and wheels was also changed and dampers were fitted between the locomotive body and the bogies.

143 120 was rebuilt into 114 301 with a maximum speed of 140 km/h (87 mph). This did not require changes to the gear ratio or the fitting of dampers.

Both rebuilt locomotives were tested in test service and normal use around Magdeburg. The upgrading to 160 km/h (99 mph) cost €300,000 per locomotive and upgrading to 140 km/h (87 mph) cost €48,000 per locomotive. For this reason only speed increases to 140 km/h (87 mph) have followed.

=== DR Class 212 to DBAG Class 112 ===
DR Class 212 and 112.0 DB and DR Class 112.1 DBAG Class 112.1 and 112.0 DBAG Class 112 and 114
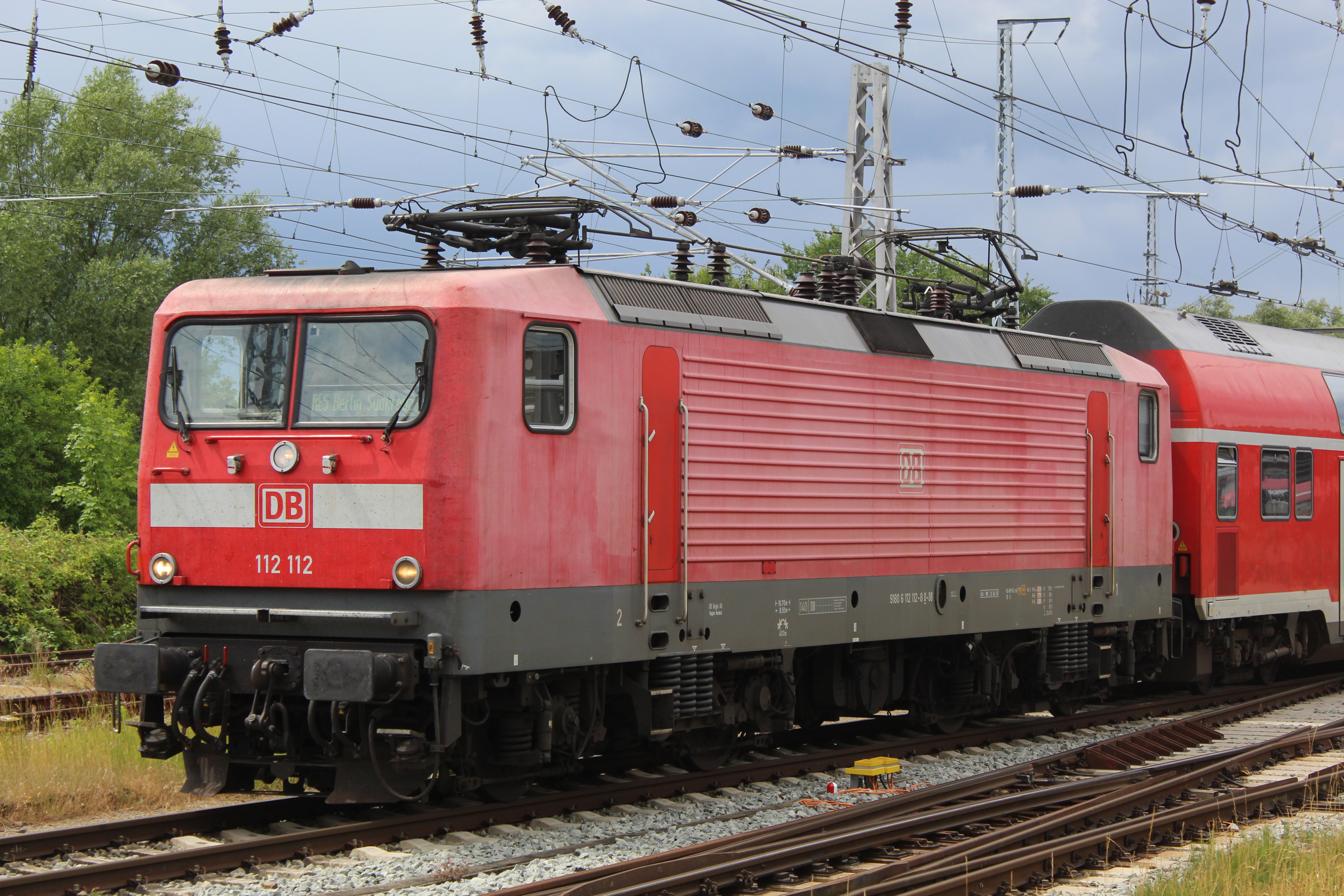
- 112 112 departing Rostock Hbf towards Berlin Südkreuz with a RegioExpress, July 2023
Type and origin
- Power type: Electric
- Builder: LEW Hennigsdorf (since 1992 AEG)
- Build date: 1990–1991 (112.0); 1992–1994 (112.1)
- Total produced: 130
Specifications
- Configuration
  - UIC: Bo′Bo′
- Gauge: 1,435 mm (4 ft 8 1/2 in)
- Wheel diameter: 1.250 m (4 ft 1.2 in) (new)
- Wheelbase: 3.300 m (10 ft 9.9 in)
- Pivot centres: 8.500 m (27 ft 10.6 in)
- Length: Over body: 15.440 m (50 ft 7.9 in); Over buffers: 16.640 m (54 ft 7.1 in)
- Width: 3.120 m (10 ft 2.8 in)
- Height
  - Body height: 3.980 m (13 ft 0.7 in)
- Axle load: 21 t (21 LT; 23 ST)
- Loco weight: 82.5 t (81.2 LT; 90.9 ST)
- Electric system/s: 15 kV 16.7 Hz overhead line
- Current pickup: Pantograph
- Traction motors: Four
- Gear ratio: 1:2.41
- Safety systems: PZ 80 (112.0) LZB I 80 (112.1)
Performance figures
- Maximum speed: 160 km/h (100 mph)
- Power output: 3,720 kW (4,990 hp)
- Tractive effort
  - Starting: 248 kN (56,000 lb_{f})
  - 1 hour: 113 kN (25,000 lb_{f})

Following German reunification, the rail routes to Berlin were rebuilt with a maximum speed of more than 120 km/h (75 mph). The Deutsche Reichsbahn had no locomotives capable of this speed so it had to acquire new faster locomotives. However, the Class 212 locomotives had originally been designed with a maximum speed of 160 km/h (99 mph). After four prototype locomotives (numbered 212 002 to 212 005, the number 212 001 had originally been used for 143 001 and was not reused) a series of 35 locomotives (212 006 to 212 040) was delivered.

The Class 112 locomotives became an unexpected symbol of German reunification because they were the first locomotive class to be used by both the Deutsche Reichsbahn and the Deutsche Bundesbahn. DR and DB each ordered 45 slightly improved locomotives of Class 112.1 from AEG, who had taken over LEW Hennigsdorf as they had owned the factory in 1946. The decision for DB to order Class 112.1 locomotives was mainly to support the factory at Hennigsdorf as DB would have preferred a 200 km/h (120 mph) universal locomotive such as the Class 120.

After overcoming a few initial problems the Class 112 were mainly used on InterRegio trains. In 1995, 112 025 (the former 212 025) was renumbered as test locomotive 755 025. Following the end of InterRegio services and the upgrading of Regional-Express rolling stock for speeds of 140 and 160 km/h (87 and 99 mph) the Class 112 locomotives are used predominantly for regional services. On 1 January 2004 DB Fernverkehr transferred all its Class 112.1 locomotives to DB Regio.

=== DBAG Class 114 ===
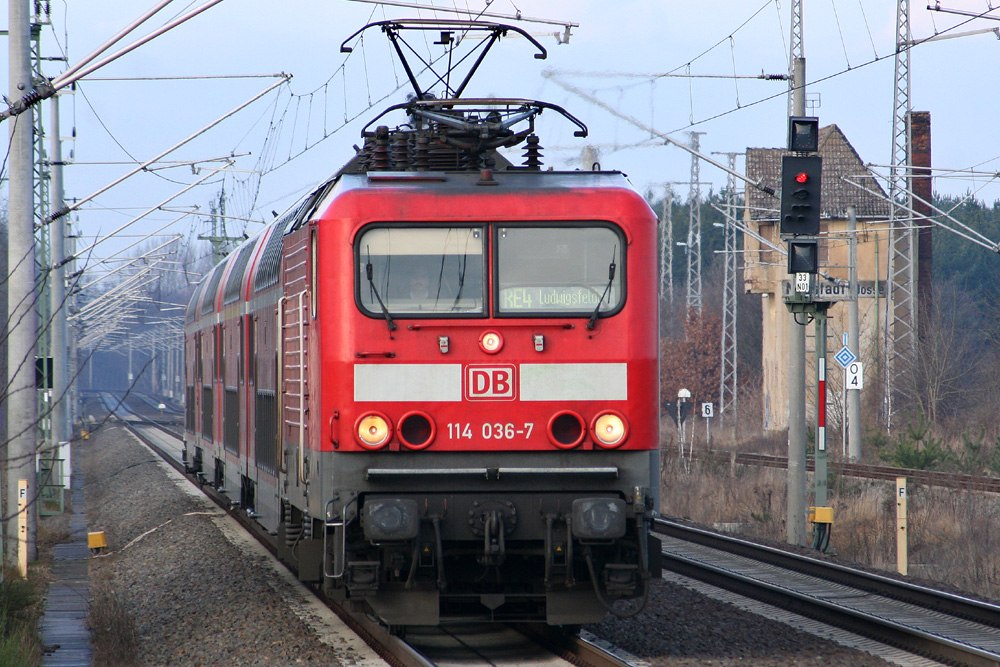
114 036 in Neustadt (Dosse)

All 38 locomotives of Class 112.0 were reclassified as Class 114 on 1 April 2000 because up to this time these locomotives had been used exclusively for regional trains in Berlin, Brandenburg and Mecklenburg-Vorpommern and there were several differences between these locomotives and the Class 112.1. Following the transfer of the remaining Class 112 locomotives to DB Regio the reason for the different classifications is unnecessary as there are similar differences between locomotives within Class 143.

=== DBAG 755 025 ===
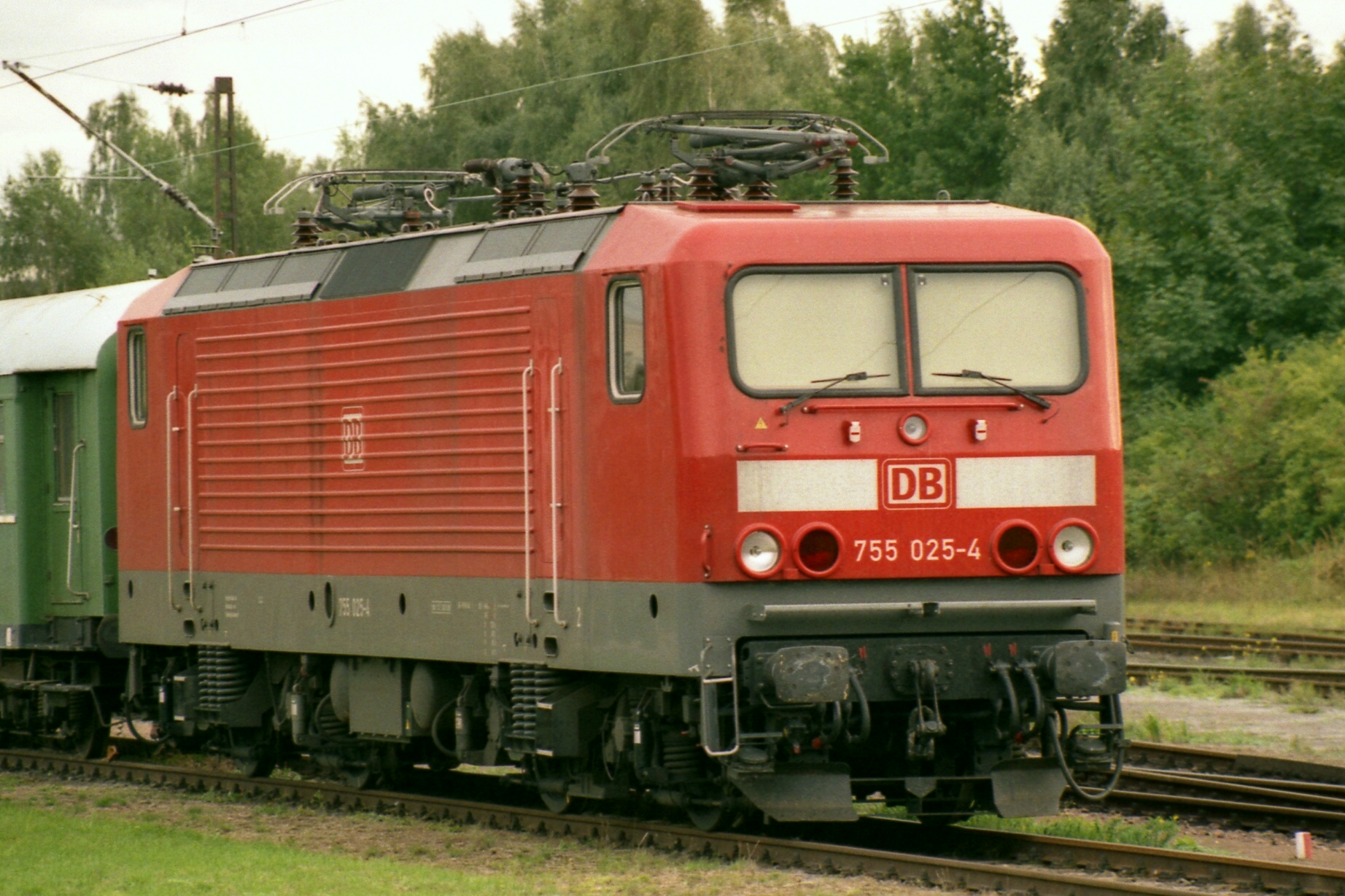
755 025 at Dessau, 13 September 2001

The VES-M Halle (Research Institute Halle) needed a fast electric locomotive for their measuring and test trains. In January 1995 they received 112 025 which was renumbered 755 025. Today it is numbered 114 501.
