= DR Class E 11 =

German electric locomotive class

DR Class E 11 / Class 211 DBAG Class 109
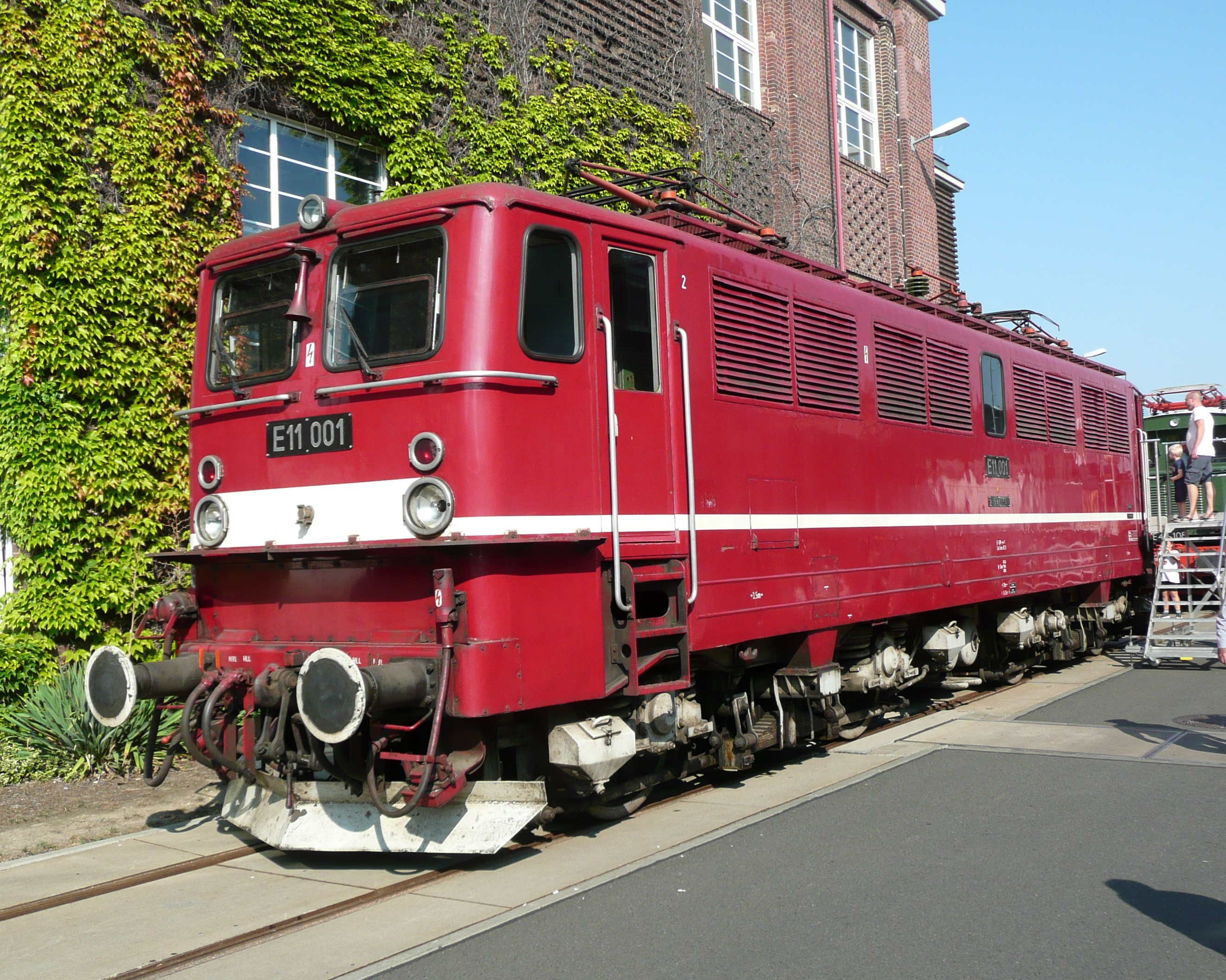
- E 11 001 in August 2019
Type and origin
- Power type: Electric
- Builder: LEW Hennigsdorf
- Build date: 1961–1963, 1970–1976
- Total produced: 96
Specifications
- Configuration
  - UIC: Bo′Bo′
- Gauge: 1,435 mm (4 ft 8 1/2 in)
- Wheel diameter: 1,350 mm (4 ft 5 1/8 in)
- Wheelbase: 11,300 mm (37 ft 1 in)
- Pivot centres: 7,800 mm (25 ft 7 in)
- Length: 16,260 mm (53 ft 4 in) over buffers
- Width: 3,050 mm (10 ft 1/8 in)
- Height
  - Pantograph: 4,530 mm (14 ft 10 3/8 in) (with pantograph lowered)
- Axle load: 20 tonnes (20 long tons; 22 short tons)
- Loco weight: 82.5 tonnes (81.2 long tons; 90.9 short tons)
- Electric system/s: 15 kV 16 2/3 Hz AC overhead catenary
- Current pickup(s): Pantograph
- Traction motors: 4 off
Performance figures
- Maximum speed: 120 km/h (75 mph)
- Power output
  - 1 hour: 2,920 kW (3,920 hp) at 98 km/h (61 mph)
  - Continuous: 2,740 kW (3,670 hp) at 104 km/h (65 mph) (from E 11 008)
- Tractive effort
  - Starting: 216 kN (49,000 lbf)
Career
- Operators: Deutsche Reichsbahn; Deutsche Bahn; Various private operators
- Class: DR: E 11, later 211; DBAG: 109
- Locale: Germany
- Withdrawn: 1990s

The DR Class E 11 is a class of electric locomotives formerly operated by the Deutsche Reichsbahn in East Germany. They were later operated by Deutsche Bahn, designated as Class 109.

== Technical specifications ==
The locomotives have a Bo-Bo axle arrangement and a power output of 2,920 kW (3,916 hp).

== History ==
The first two pre-series locomotives entered service in 1961. From 1970 onward, the Class E 11 was designated as Class 211. Construction resumed until 1976, with 95 locomotives built, and one locomotive rebuilt and renumbered after a rail accident, bringing the total number of locomotives to 96. Deutsche Bahn withdrew their last former E 11 locomotive, now designated as Class 109, in May 1998.

Locomotive E 11 004 was badly damaged in a rear-end collision at Großkorbetha station on 29 August 1969. The manufacturer LEW Hennigsdorf rebuilt it with a car body taken from the current series using usable parts. When it was put back into service, it was given the new company number 211 056 because it no longer corresponded to the original construction and delivery condition.

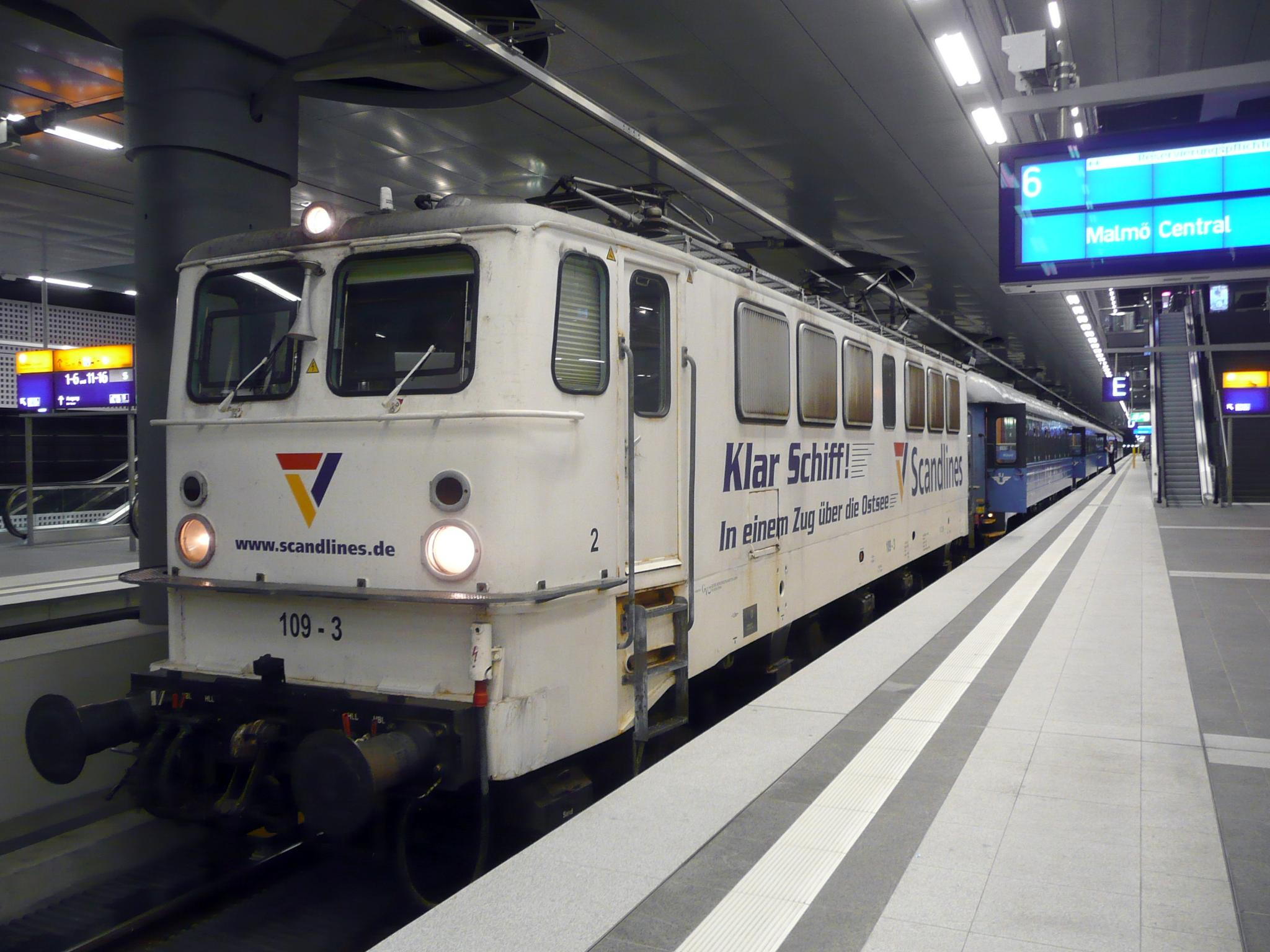
Former E 11 operated by Georg Verkehrsorganisation, hauling the Berlin-Night-Express in September 2008

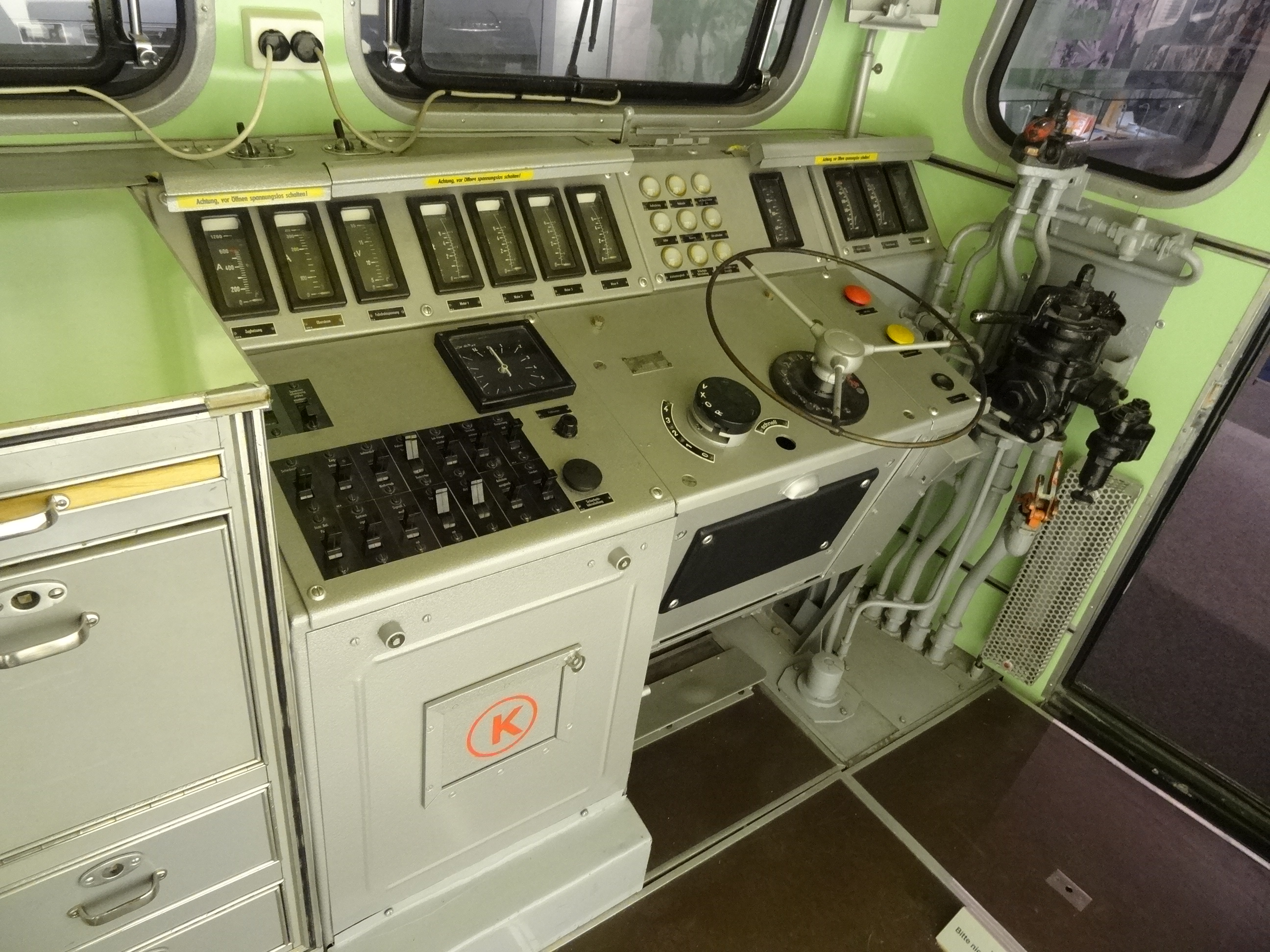
Cab of E 11 033
