= DR Class E 42 =

German electric locomotive class

DR Class E 42 / Class 242 DBAG Class 142
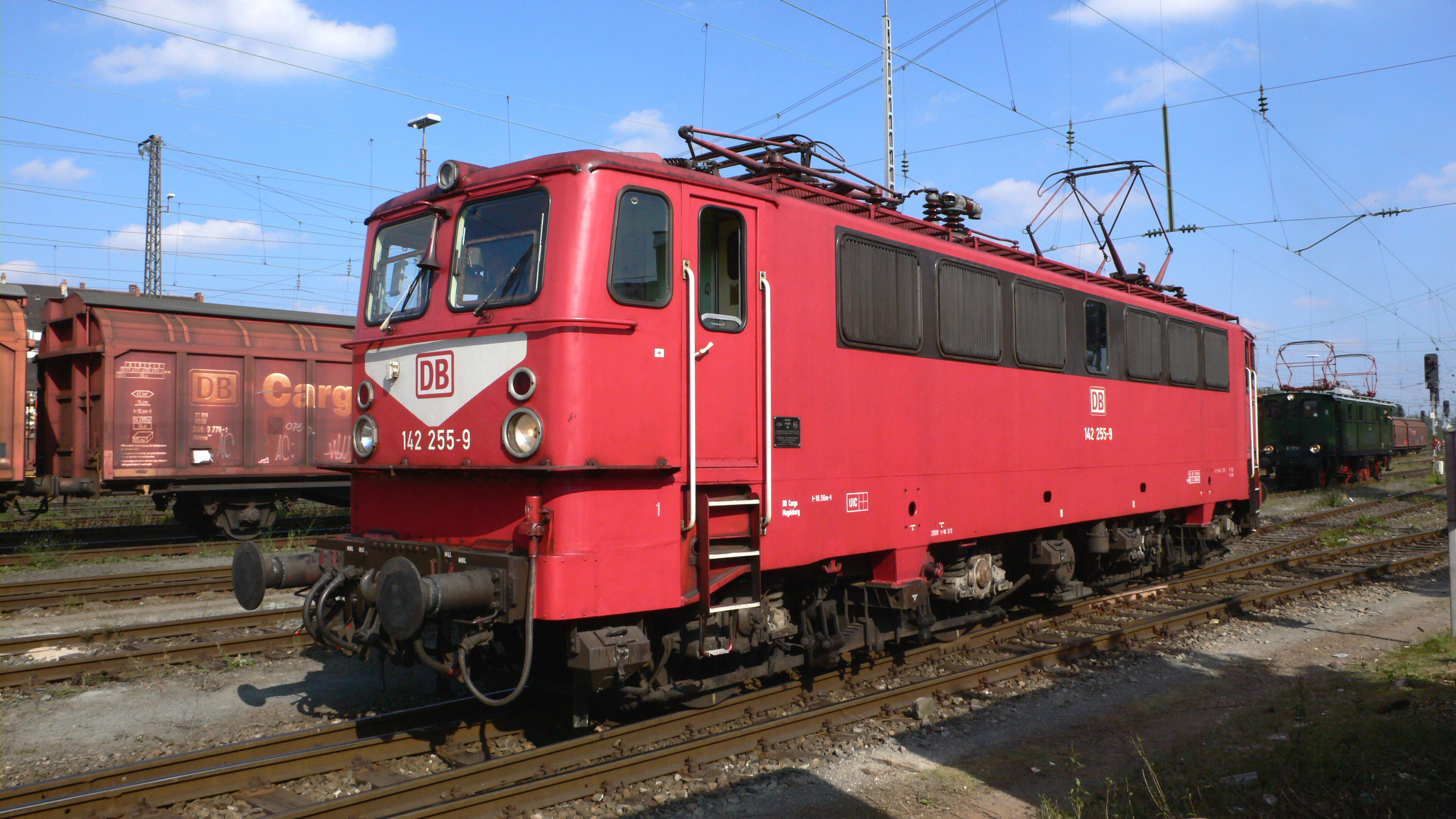
- 142 255 in September 2007
Type and origin
- Power type: Electric
- Builder: LEW Hennigsdorf
- Build date: 1963–1976
- Total produced: 292
Specifications
- Configuration
  - UIC: Bo′Bo′
- Gauge: 1,435 mm (4 ft 8 1/2 in)
- Wheel diameter: 1,350 mm (4 ft 5 1/4 in)
- Wheelbase: 11,300 mm (37 ft 1 in)
- Pivot centres: 7,800 mm (25 ft 7 in)
- Length: 16,260 mm (53 ft 4 1/4 in) over buffers
- Width: 3,050 mm (10 ft 1/8 in)
- Height
  - Pantograph: 4,530 mm (14 ft 10 3/8 in) (with pantograph lowered)
- Axle load: 20 tonnes (20 long tons; 22 short tons)
- Loco weight: 82.5 tonnes (81.2 long tons; 90.9 short tons)
- Electric system/s: 15 kV 16 2/3 Hz AC overhead catenary
- Current pickup(s): Pantograph
- Traction motors: 4 off
Performance figures
- Maximum speed: 100 km/h (60 mph)
- Power output
  - 1 hour: 2,920 kW (3,920 hp) at 72 km/h (45 mph)
  - Continuous: 2,740 kW (3,670 hp) at 76 km/h (47 mph)
- Tractive effort
  - Starting: 245 kN (55,000 lbf)
Career
- Operators: Deutsche Reichsbahn; Deutsche Bahn; Various private operators
- Class: DR: E 42, later 242; DBAG: 142
- Locale: Germany, Switzerland
- Withdrawn: from 1992

The DR Class E 42 is a class of electric locomotives formerly operated by the Deutsche Reichsbahn in East Germany. They were later operated by Deutsche Bahn, designated as Class 142.

== Technical specifications ==
The locomotives have a Bo-Bo axle arrangement and a power output of 2,920 kW (3,916 hp).

== History ==
A total of 292 locomotives were built. From 1970 onward, they were designated as Class 242. Some locomotives were acquired by Lokoop and hired out for services in Switzerland.

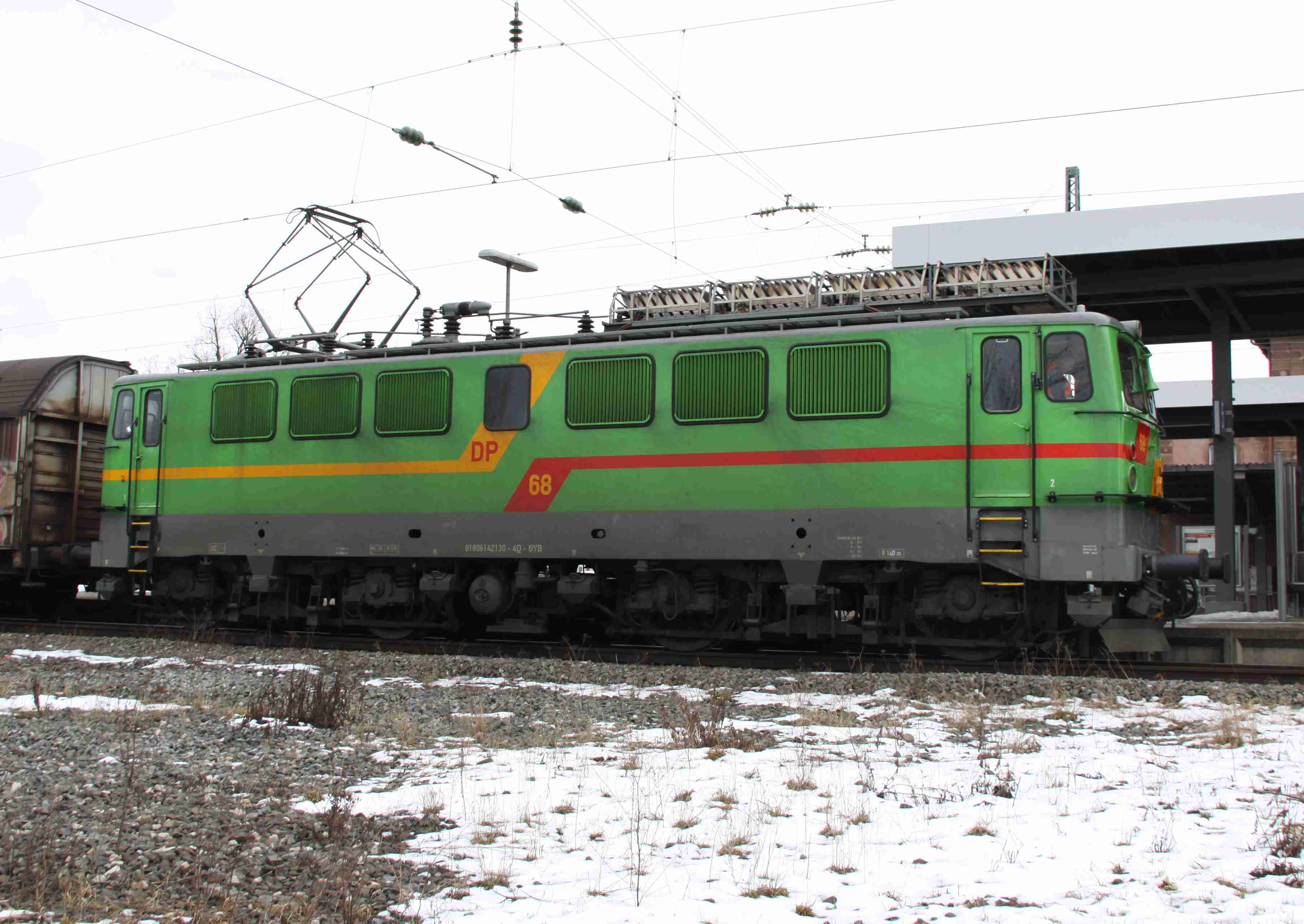
142 130 operated by BayernBahn

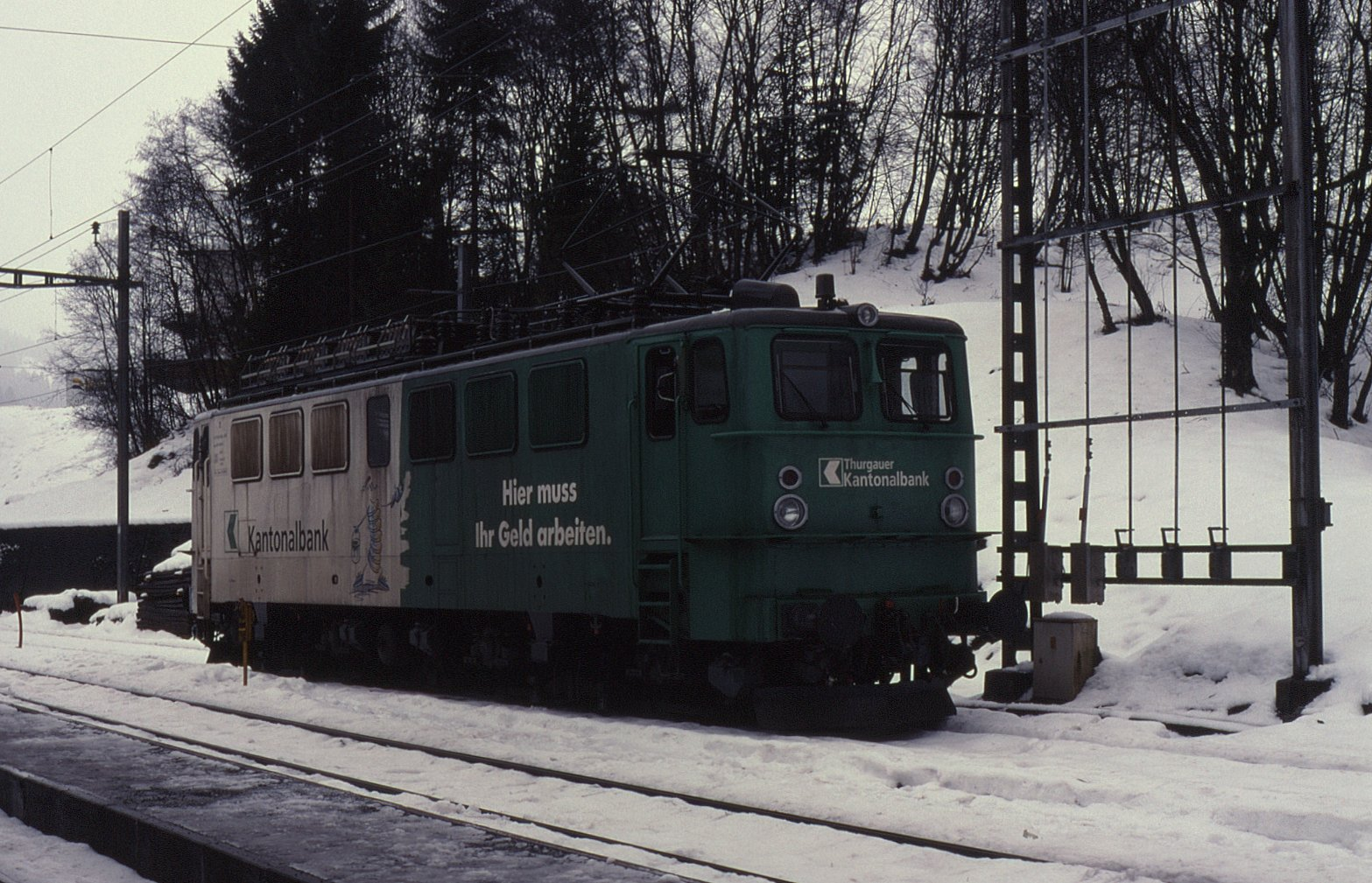
Former E 42 in Switzerland

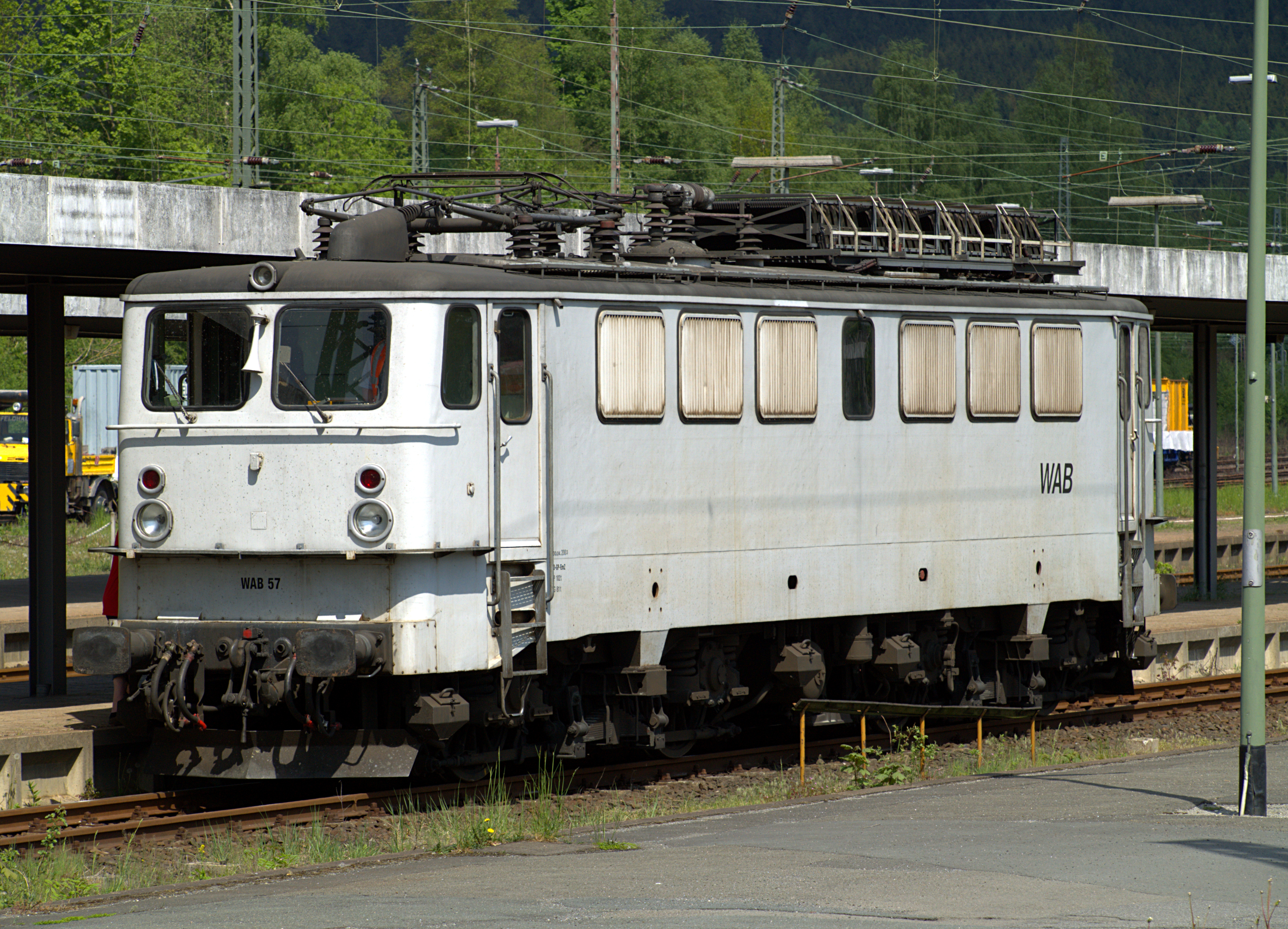
Former E 42 operated by Westfälische Almetalbahn
