= LEW Hennigsdorf =

Former German rail vehicle manufacturer

Coordinates: 52.62622°N 13.2129°E

LEW Hennigsdorf (1951-1992)
- Type: subsidiary
- Industry: Rail transport, locomotive manufacturing
- Predecessor: acquired: August Borsig Lokomotiv-Werke, Berlin (-1931); Borsig Lokomotiv Werke GmbH (1931-1944); VEM Vereinigung Volkseigener Betriebe des Elektro-Maschinenbaus-Lokomotivbau Elektrotechnische Werke Hennigsdorf (Osthavelland) (1947-1951)
- Founded: 1910
- Founder: AEG
- Successor: AEG Schienenfahrzeuge GmbH
- Headquarters: Hennigsdorf, Berlin, Germany
- Number of employees: 2200 (2010)
- Parent: AEG (1985–1996); Adtranz (1996–2001); Bombardier Transportation (2001–2021); Alstom (2021–present)

The rail vehicle factory in Hennigsdorf, Germany, was founded in 1910 by AEG. Locomotive production began in 1913, and in the 1930s absorbed the work of the August Borsig locomotive factory, being renamed the Borsig Lokomotiv Werke GmbH until 1944. After the Second World War the factory was nationalised in the German Democratic Republic and produced electric locomotives for home use and for export, mainly to Communist Bloc countries under the name Lokomotivbau-Elektrotechnische Werke (LEW).

After German reunification in 1990, the plant returned to AEG ownership, becoming AEG Schienenfahrzeuge GmbH, and then passed through mergers of its parent companies to Adtranz (1996), Bombardier Transportation (2001) and then Alstom (2021). Under Adtranz's ownership production of locomotives ended, and the site now manufactures diesel and electric multiple units.

== History ==
In 1910 the AEG company acquired a 700,000 m^{2} (0.27 sq mi) of land in Hennigsdorf near Berlin for the creation of a ceramics factory which began production in 1911. In 1913 AEG's locomotive works was relocated from Brunnenstrasse in Berlin to Hennigsdorf and began manufacturing electric vehicles. Between 1914 and 1918 the plant underwent a considerable change in production - being converted to the production of steam locomotives.

In 1920/1 a joint venture Rosenthal-Isolatoren GmbH (Rosenthal Insulators) with Rosenthal & Co. AG as well as a steel plant were founded in Hennigsdorf. In 1921 the manufacturer of steam power plants for industry began, and in 1927 the first operational steam engine powered by powdered coal was built.

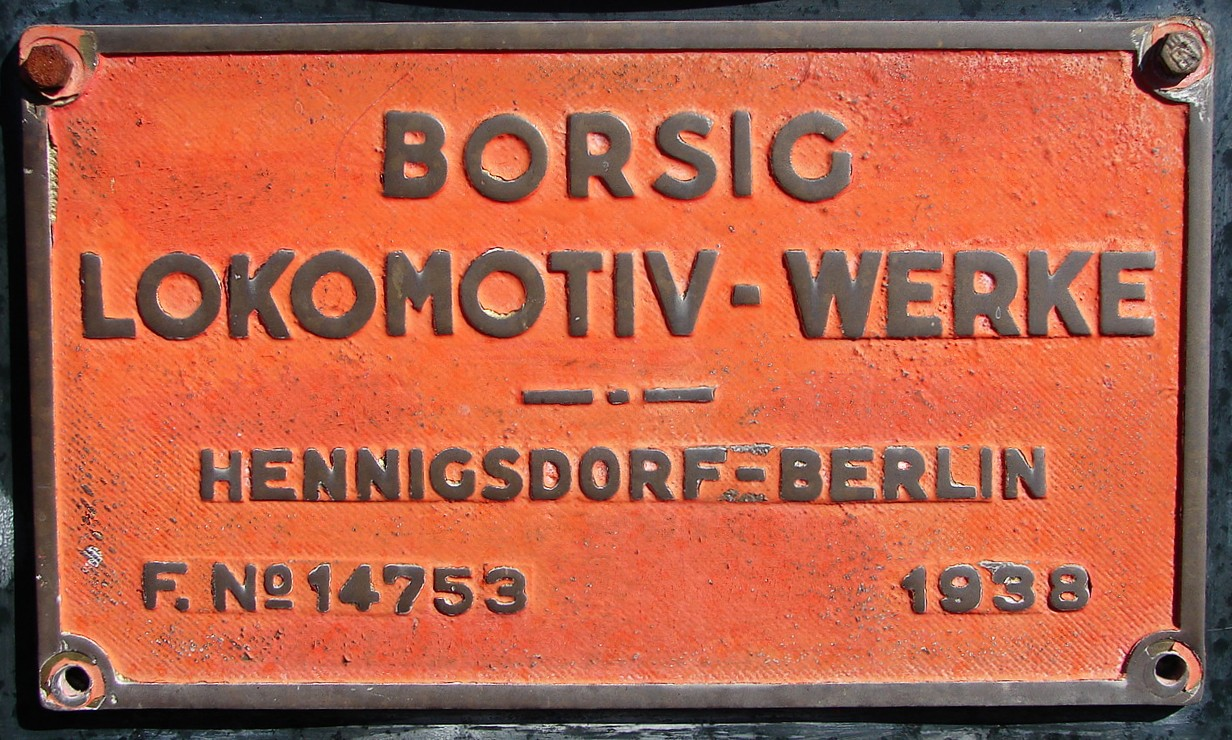
Borsig builder's plate, South African Class 19D no. 2702 of 1938

In 1931 AEG merged with Borsig AG which had been bankrupted by the effects of the Great Depression. The locomotive company's production was moved from Borsig's factory in Tegel to the Hennigsdorf plant, in 1935 AEG acquired all of Borsig's shares and became sole owner. Production of locomotives as Hennigsdorf continue under the name Borsig Lokomotiv Werke GmbH as a subsidiary of the AEG group up till 1944.

After then end of the Second World War 80% of the factory had been destroyed, and came under the control of the USSR being in the eastern part of Germany. In 1947 the factory was nationalised, becoming the "VEM Vereinigung Volkseigener Betriebe des Elektro-Maschinenbaus-Lokomotivbau Elektrotechnische Werke Hennigsdorf (Osthavelland)", and in 1948 production of electric locomotives began. In 1951 the plant was renamed VEB Lokomotivbau-Elektrotechnische Werke "Hans Beimler" (Note: Named after Hans Beimler, German anti-nazi, and member of the Reichstag) (Note: VEB Volkseigener Betrieb (people-owned enterprise)) shortened to LEW.

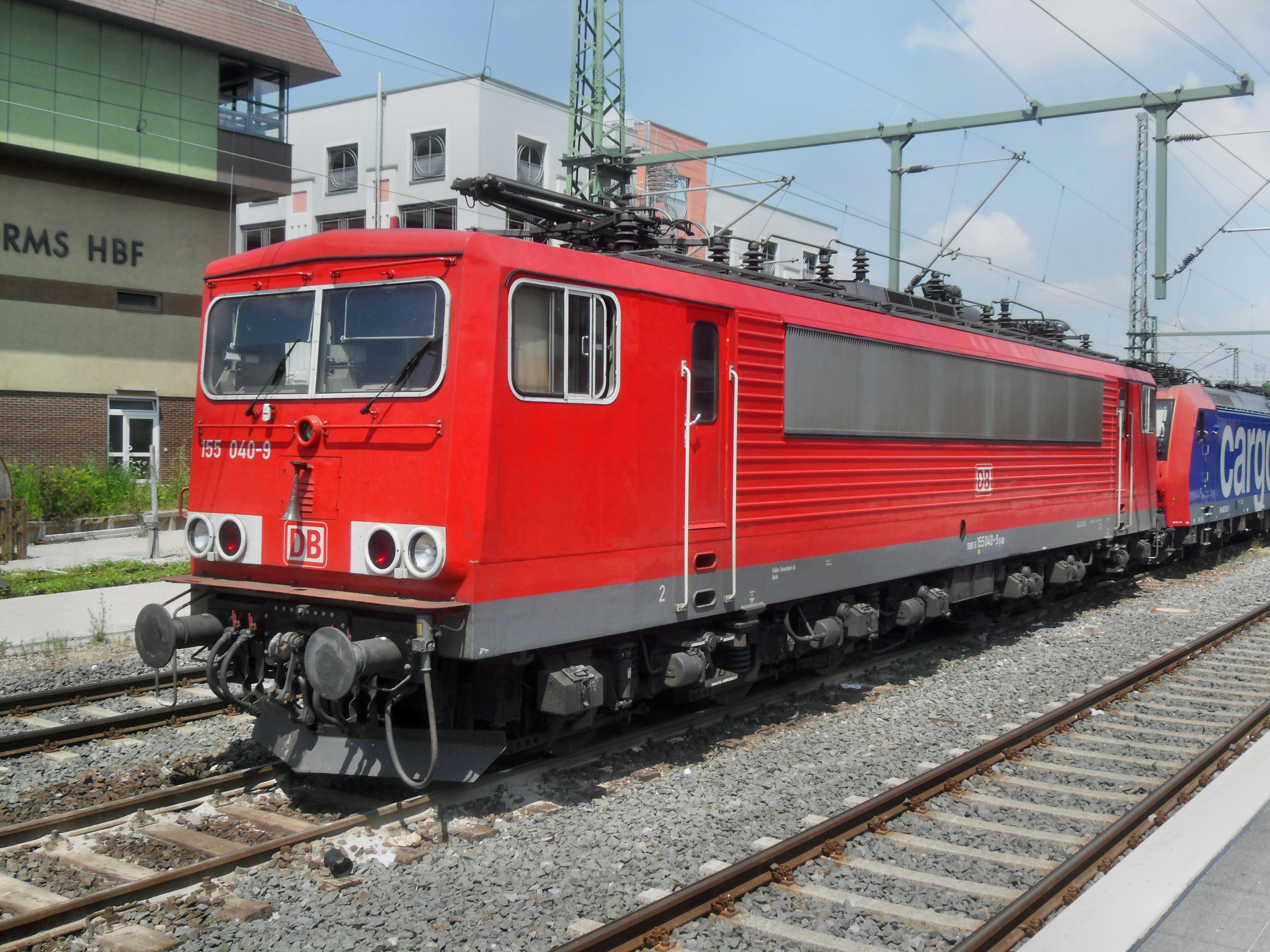
DR 250-040 in Worms main station in 2009

In 1955 production of a wide range of rail vehicles including trams, diesel locomotives, underground and rack locomotives, and mineral wagons was underway, with 60% of the production for export. In 1960 the factory began to undertake the production of ultra-pure metals by electron beam furnace. In the 1960s, 1970s and 1980s the factory produced new classes of electric locomotive for the Deutsche Reichsbahn including the DR Class 250 (1974), the DR Class 243 (1982).

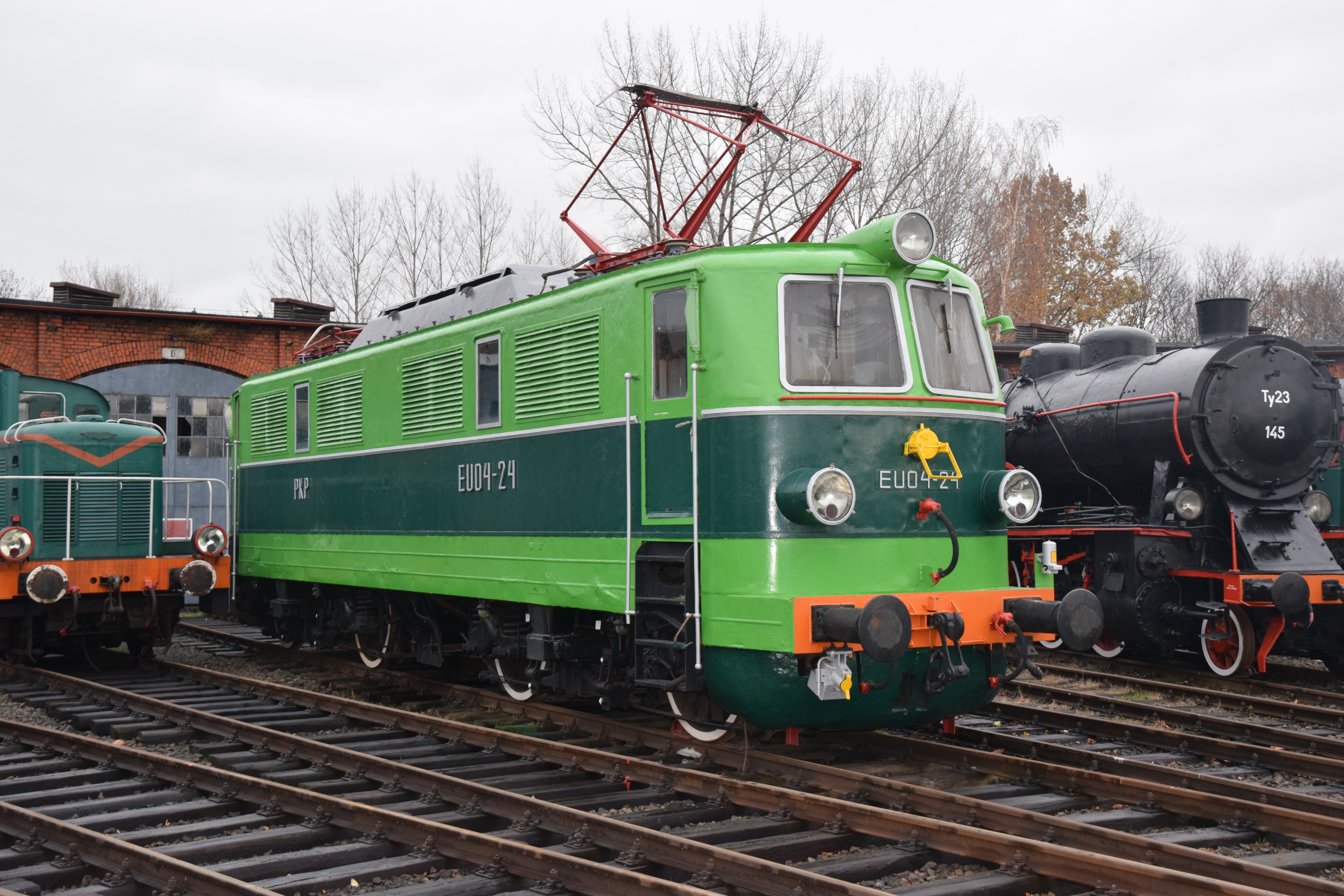
PKP EU04-24 In Jaworzyna Śląska Museum in 2017, One of The Remaining 24 Electric Locomotives Built For PKP Between 1954-1955. Currently Preserved In Jaworzyna Śląska Museum Along With Steam Locomotives & a Shunter Locomotive

From the mid-1980s, LEW began to cooperate with AEG, in which Daimler-Benz took majority control around the same time, in exports to third countries, peaking in the 601 Series (today Class 520) intercity diesel multiple units for Greece's OSE in 1989. In 1989 the two companies signed a memorandum of cooperation. In 1990, at the time of the German reunification, LEW was transformed from a combine into a non-public company as LEW Hennigsdorf GmbH, and talks about a takeover by AEG started the same year. In November 1991, AEG agreed with the Treuhand to purchase the rail core business parts of LEW and invest in the Hennigsdorf production facilities for altogether 600 million DM. From 1 January 1992, the works became a separate subsidiary under the AEG Bahnsysteme (AEG Rail Systems) business area of AEG Daimler Benz under the name AEG Schienenfahrzeuge GmbH. In 1992, AEG Bahnsysteme was reorganised into four business sub-areas, one for North America and the Fernverkehr (Long-Distance Traffic), Nahverkehr (Local Traffic) and Bahngesamtsysteme (Complete Rail Systems) areas for Europe, and concentrated and headquartered the Long-Distance Traffic business area at Hennigsdorf.

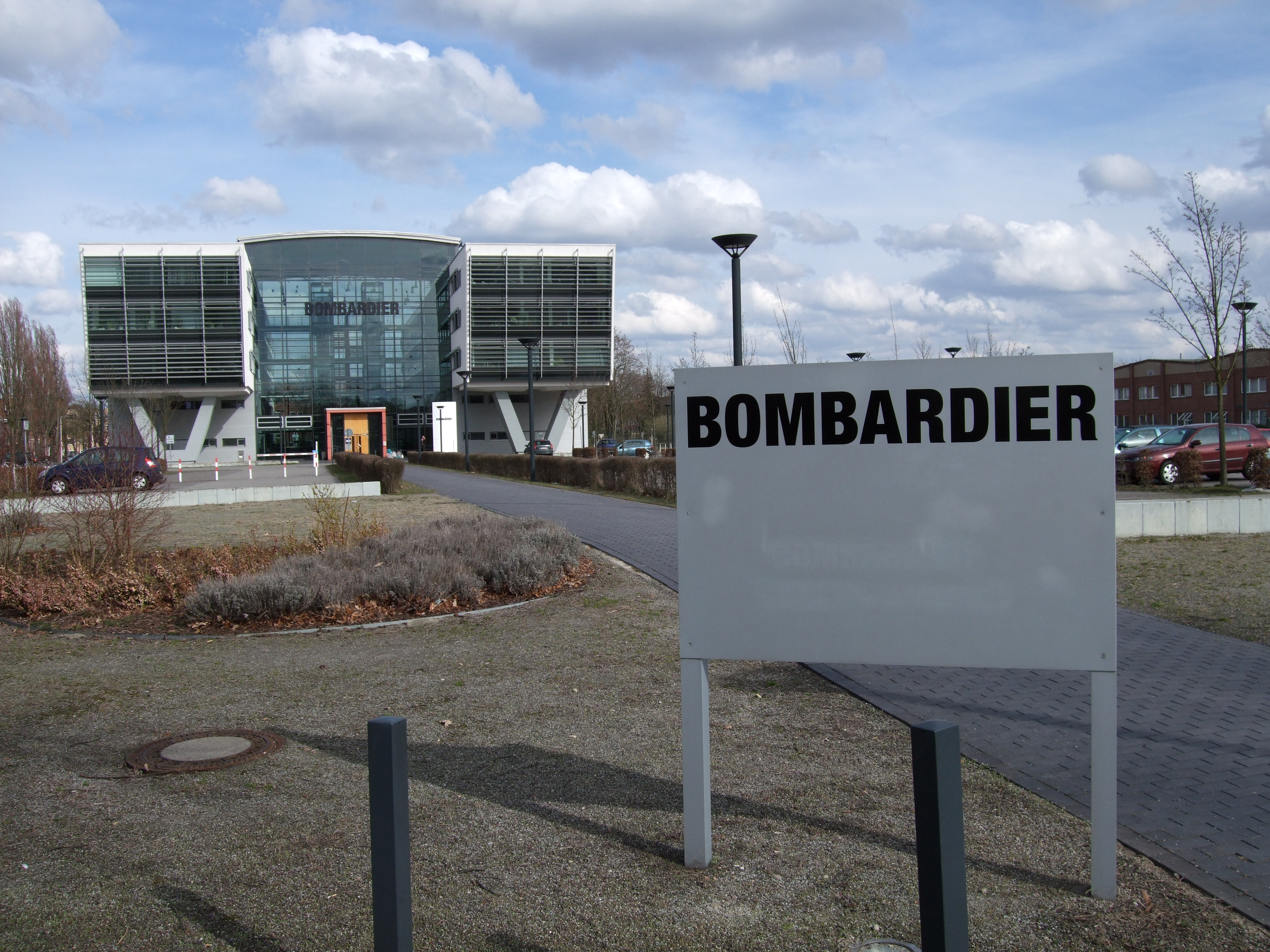
Bombardier Hennigsdorf

In January 1996, AEG Schienenfahrzeuge GmbH was integrated into the newly formed ABB Daimler Benz Transportation (Adtranz), a joint venture of ABB and Daimler-Benz formed by merging AEG Bahnsysteme and its subsidiaries with ABB Transportation. As Adtranz reorganised production among its factories, locomotive production ended at Hennigsdorf and was transferred to the former ABB Henschel works in Kassel in 1998. With the acquisition of Adtranz by Bombardier Inc. in May 2001, the Hennigsdorf works became part of Bombardier Transportation.

As part of Bombardier Transportation (and continuing with Alstom since 2021), the plant manufactures passenger rail vehicles including the RegioSwinger and Itino DMUs, the DBAG Class 422, DBAG Class 424 and NS Sprinter Lighttrain EMUs and the Bombardier Talent, ICE 3 and MOVIA trains.
