= Messehallen (Hamburg convention center) =

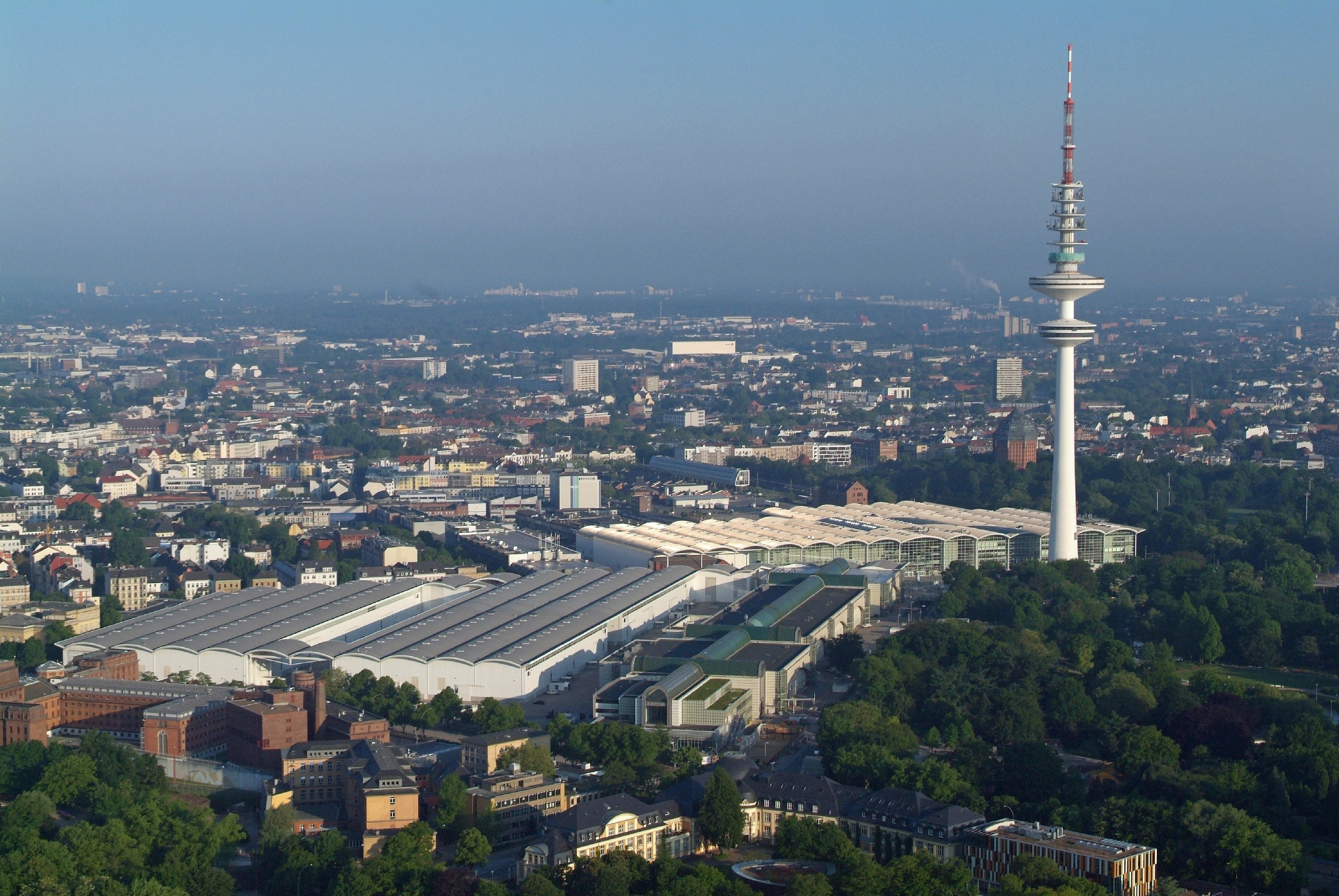
Aerial view, also showing the Heinrich Hertz Tower

Messehallen is a convention center located in the St. Pauli district of Hamburg, Germany. The site has a total of 99,000 m^{2} (1,070,000 sq ft) indoor floor area. The center hosts trade shows, concerts and other events. It is run by Hamburg Messe und Congress, which is also managing Congress Center Hamburg.

== Trade fairs ==
Notable trade fairs include Hanseboot, Internorga and SMM Hamburg.

== Music events ==
Notable past performers include AC/DC, Whitesnake, Judas Priest, Ozzy Osbourne and Iron Maiden.

== Exhibition campus ==
The exhibition complex is in the city center, and covers roughly 950,000 sq ft of exhibition floor in eleven halls as well as 100,000 sq ft of open air space.

== Neighborhood and transportation ==
Both the fair halls and the CCH are located next to the Planten un Blomen city park, Sternschanze and the Karolinenviertel. The south entrance of the fairgrounds is next to Sievekingplatz, which hosts the Messehallen U-Bahn station. The west entry can be reached via the Sternschanze station. The east entry can be accessed via Dammtor long distance train station.

The CCH – Congress Center Hamburg is 1 kilometre (0.62 mi) from south entrance, and the west entrance is 1.5 kilometres (0.93 mi) from the south entrance, by foot.

== Gallery ==
East entrance

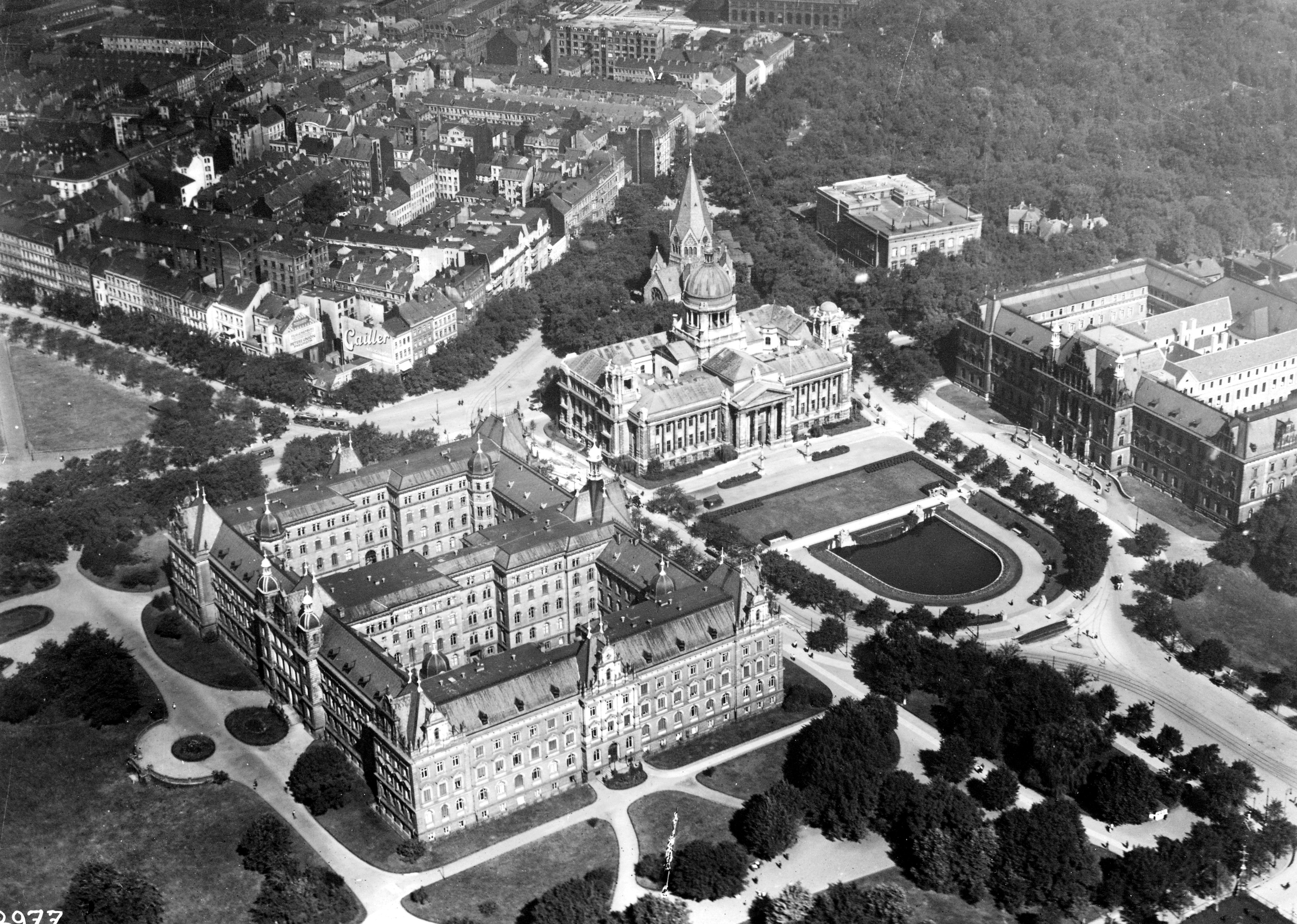
The Sievekingplatz. The south entrance and the B6 hall would be constructed next to the Studienkolleg, in the upper right, on the grounds of the Zoological Garden of Hamburg. The domed building is the Hanseatisches Oberlandesgericht court house. The Messehallen U-Bahn station is between the court house and the Church of Saint John of Kronstadt.
