= Sternschanze station =

Underground rapid transit station in Germany

Sternschanze
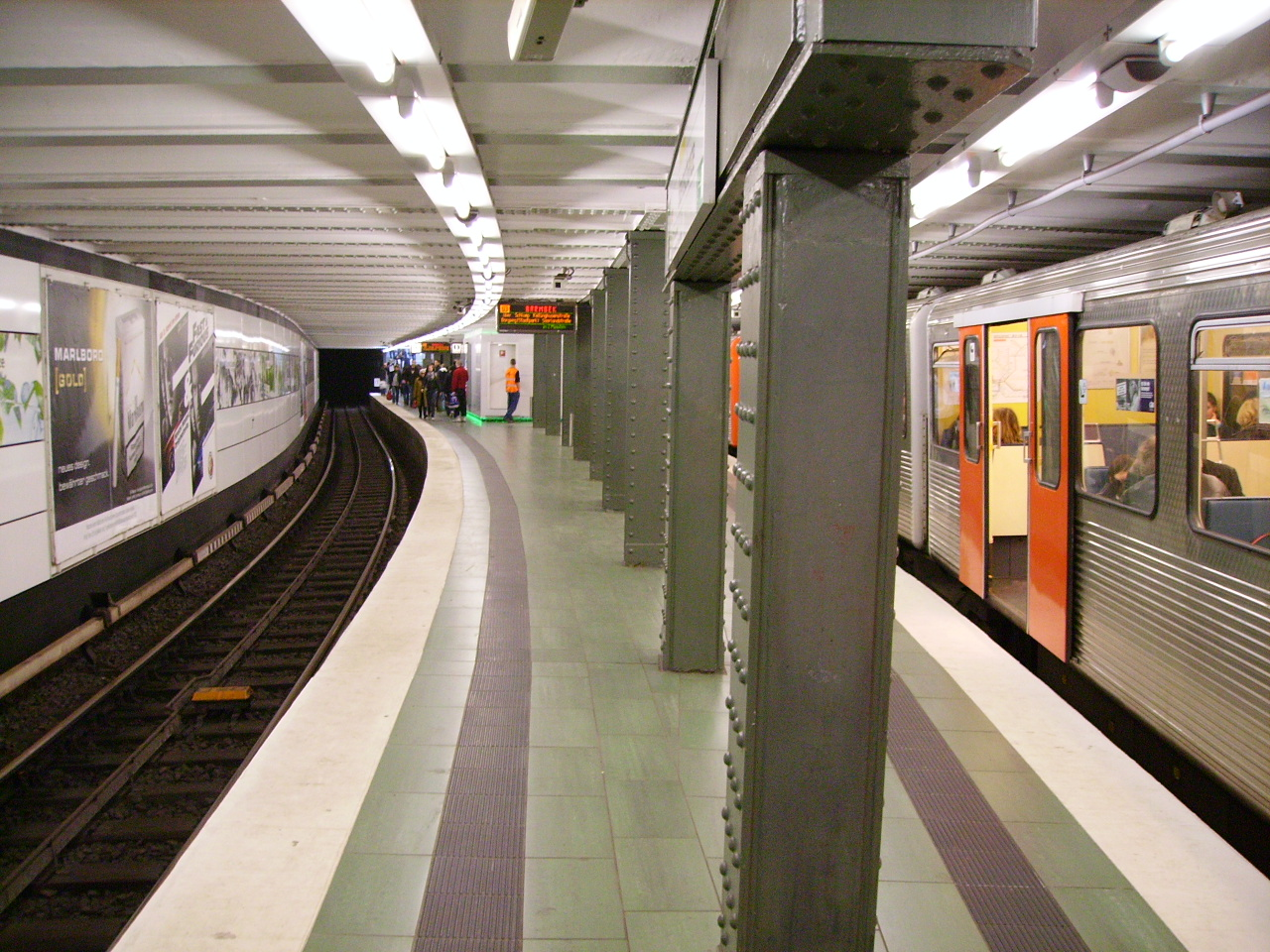
- Hamburg U-Bahn station Sternschanze platform

General information
- Location: Sternschanze 1; 20357 Hamburg, Germany
- Coordinates: 53°33′49″N 9°58′1″E
- Operator: S-Bahn Hamburg GmbH; Hamburger Hochbahn AG
- Lines: S2 S5 U3
- Platforms: 2 island platforms
- Tracks: 4
- Connections: Bus

Construction
- Structure type: Elevated (S-Bahn); Underground (U-Bahn)
- Accessible: Yes

Other information
- Station code: DB: 2516; HHA: SZ
- Fare zone: HVV: A/000 and 101

History
- Opened: 16 July 1866; 160 years ago 25 May 1912; 114 years ago
- Rebuilt: relocated westwards by 400 m till 15 May 1903; 123 years ago
- Electrified: 29 January 1908; 118 years ago, 6.3 kV AC system (overhead; turned off in 1955); 10 April 1941; 85 years ago, 1.2 kV DC system (3rd rail) at opening

Services
Preceding station	Hamburg S-Bahn	Following station
Holstenstraße towards Hamburg-Altona	S2	Hamburg Dammtor towards Aumühle
Holstenstraße towards Elbgaustraße	S5	Hamburg Dammtor towards Stade
Preceding station	Hamburg U-Bahn	Following station
Schlump towards Barmbek	U3	Feldstraße towards Wandsbek-Gartenstadt
Location
- Location within Hamburg Location within Schleswig-Holstein Location within Germany Location within Europe

Sternschanze is a rapid transit station for the trains of Hamburg S-Bahn lines S2 and S5 and Hamburg U-Bahn line U3. The railway station is located in the quarter Sternschanze in the Hamburg borough of Altona, Germany. North of the railway station is a bus stop for the terminating HHA bus route 181.

== History ==
The first Sternschanze station opened on 16 July 1866, located a little east of the current station. That station was at-grade, with a number of level crossings at nearby streets. On 15 May 1903 a new, elevated station was built, including a massive station hall. The U-Bahn station followed on 25 May 1912. During the 1970s, the S-Bahn's station hall was dismantled.

== Station layout ==
Sternschanze is a small cul-de-sac between the station to the south and Sternschanzenpark to the north. The western main entrance for the S-Bahn platform is at the intersection of Sternschanze and Schanzenstraße. A common entrance for U-Bahn and S-Bahn is located at the S-Bahn's eastern entrance, some 150 metres (490 ft) further down Sternschanze.

The island platform and tracks for the S-Bahn are elevated on a rail dam, along with tracks for regional and long-distance trains that run past the station south of it. The S-Bahn platform is handicap-accessible through a lift. The station is unstaffed, but there are emergency and information telephones, ticket machines, and a shop.

The underground platform of the U3 is situated at the east side of the railway station and has only one entrance at the platform's southern end. The underground station is not fully accessible for the disabled. At this location, a pedestrian tunnel underneath the rail dam provides access to Hamburg Messe and Congress Center Hamburg (CCH). Hence, the station is also known by the name Sternschanze (Messe).

== Service ==
Hamburg Sternschanze

General information
- Location: Altona, Hamburg; Germany
- System: Bf
- Line: Hamburg-Altona link line

Other information
- Station code: 2516
- DS100 code: ASST
- Category: 4
Location

The lines S2 and S5 of Hamburg S-Bahn and the line U3 of Hamburg U-Bahn call at Sternschanze station.

== Gallery ==
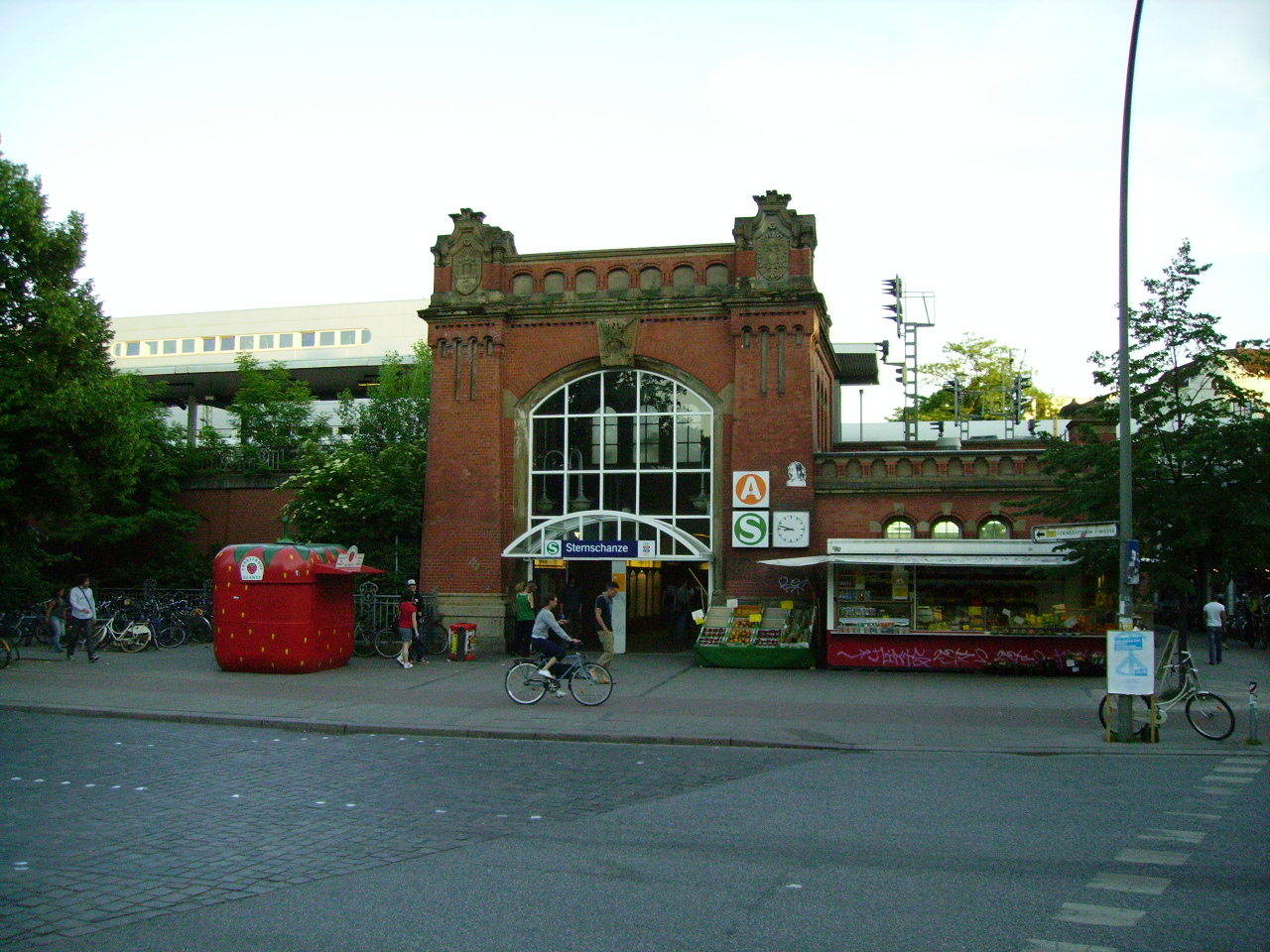
The S-Bahn's western entrance

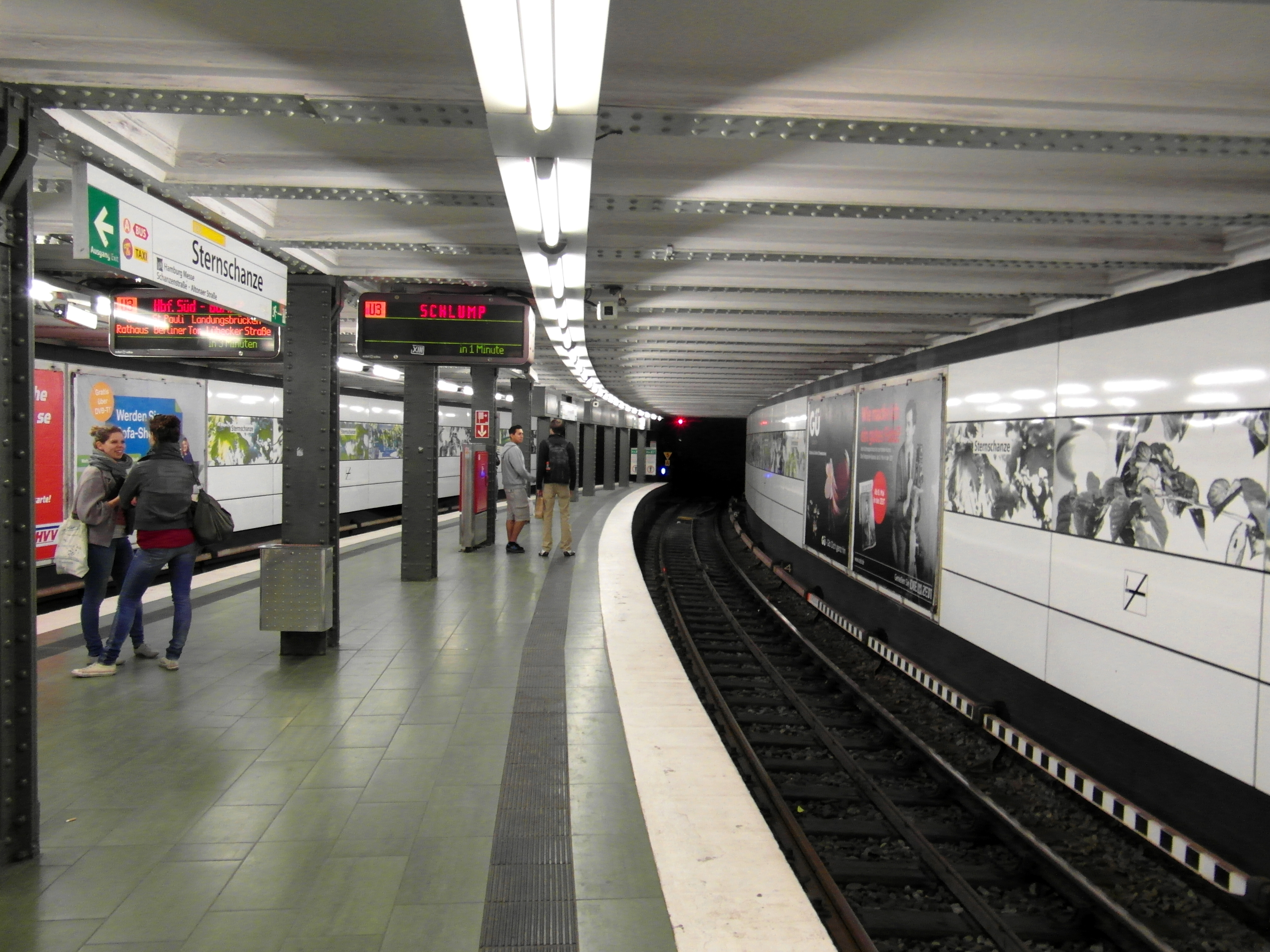
Platform for the U-Bahn

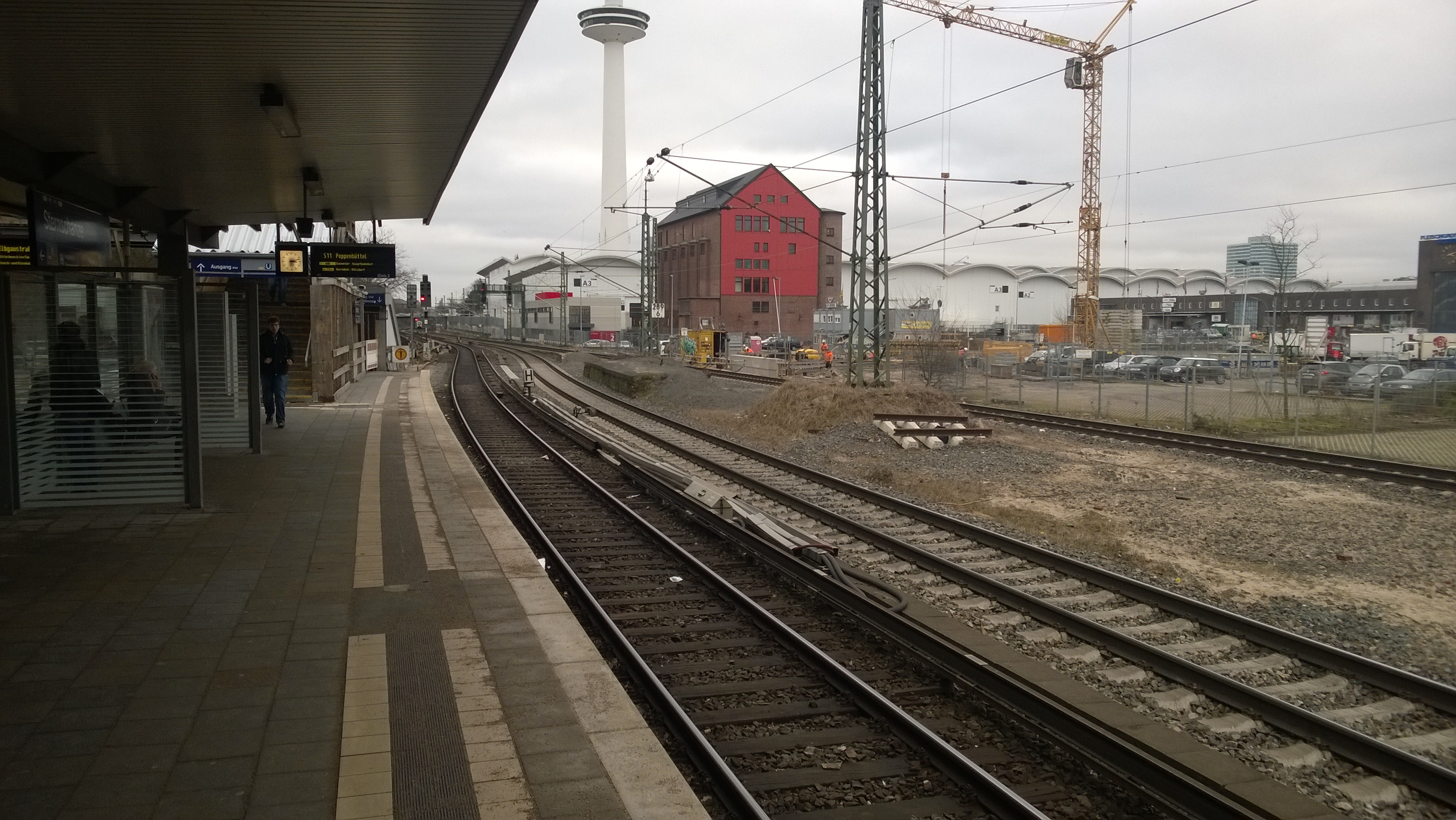
Platform for the S-Bahn with the west entrance of the Messehallen visible in the background.

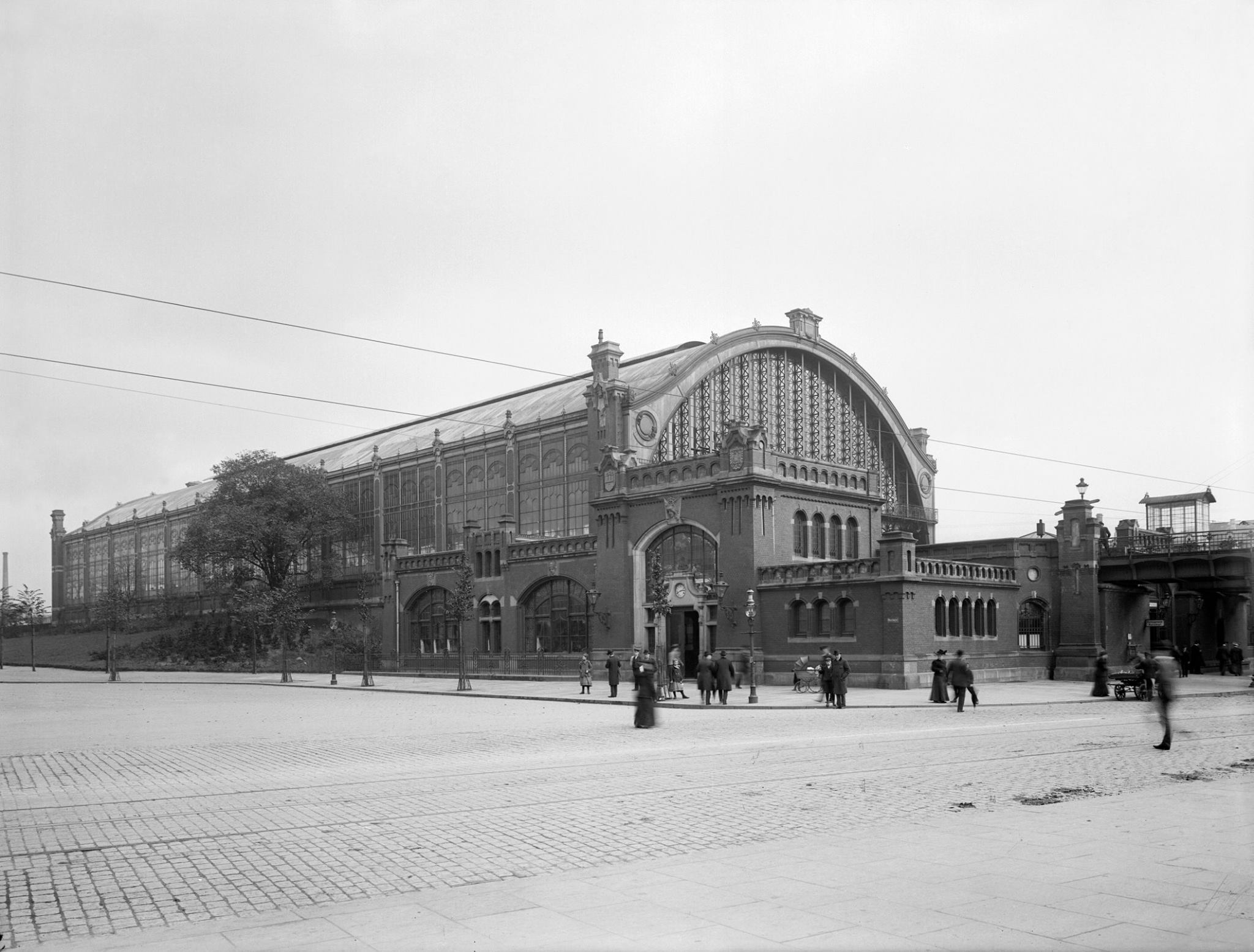
The train shed was torn down in 1975.

== See also ==
- Hamburger Verkehrsverbund (HVV)
- List of Hamburg S-Bahn stations
- List of Hamburg U-Bahn stations
