= Klabunde =

Klabunde is a German surname that may refer to the following notable people:

- Charles S. Klabunde (born 1935), American artist
- Clara Klabunde (1906–1994), German lawyer
- Kristin Klabunde (born 1991), American actress
- Reinhard Klabunde, 19th century American politician
