= OMR Festival =

Digital marketing event

- Status: Active
- Genre: Digital Marketing, Technology
- Begins: May 7, 2024
- Ends: May 8, 2024
- Frequency: Annually
- Venue: Hamburg Messe
- Location: Hamburg
- Country: Germany
- Years active: 15
- Founded: February 11, 2011
- Founders: Philipp Westermeyer, Tobias Schlottke, Christian Müller, Christian Byza
- Most recent: May 9, 2023 - May 10, 2023
- Participants: 70,000 (2022)
- Organiser: Ramp 106 GmbH
- Sponsors: Adobe, Audi, Vodafone
- Website: omr.com

The OMR Festival, known as the Online Marketing Rockstars Festival (OMR) is one of the world’s largest events for digital marketing and technology. Since its founding in 2011, the annual OMR Festival has taken place in Hamburg, Germany. The organizer of the event is Ramp 106 GmbH; the team of founders includes Philipp Westermeyer, Tobias Schlottke, Christian Müller and Christian Byza.

The OMR Festival is organized into two parallel events: the Expo and Conference.

== OMR Expo ==
The OMR Expo is a trade fair that launched in 2011. Pertaining to be the Online Marketing Rockstars Festival, this trade fair is the largest meet-up in Europe for executives, managers, and decision-makers who work in the digital economy, the media industry or the marketing industry. The convention is held annually in the Messehallen Hamburg.

== Target audience ==
As a B2B trade fair, the OMR Festival is primarily aimed at CEOs, higher-ups and marketing managers from companies of all sizes, who seek information and exchange on the current possibilities and solutions in the digital marketing sector.

== History ==
=== 2019 ===
2019 was a year of firsts for the OMR Festival. Instead of being scheduled in late February/March as usual, OMR19 moved to May for the first time, taking place on May 7 & 8, 2019. OMR19 also saw the first rendition of the Festival to take up six halls at the Hamburg Exhibition Center and cracked the 50,000-attendee mark (52,000) for the first time. The Expo portion of the Festival featured 400 exhibitors, 150 Masterclasses, 37 Guided Tours and 100 Side Events. Headlining the Conference on May 8 were New York Times' best-selling author Yuval Noah Harari, Endeavor executive Bozoma Saint John, Headspace CEO Andy Puddicombe, JD.Com CEO Bowen Zhou, The Atlantic journalist Taylor Lorenz and British recording artist Ellie Goulding.

=== 2018 ===
The OMR Festival 2018 took place on March 22 & 23 in five halls, encompassing 65,000 square meters, at the Hamburg Exhibition Center. More than 40,000 people and 300 exhibitors from Europe and beyond attended the event. More than 300 speakers and presenters took part in 120 Masterclasses, on two Expo stages and at the Conference. These included Andrus Ansip, Vice President of the European Commission, Nasty Gal founder Sophia Amoruso, Metallica drummer Lars Ulrich, Fitness influencer and entrepreneur Kayla Itsines, En Marche campaign manager Guillaume Liegey, blogger Tim Urban (Wait But Why), Scott Galloway, L2 founder and professor the NYU Stern School of Business, Zalando founder Robert Gentz, Axel Springer SE boss Mathias Döpfner, influencer twins Lisa and Lena, star statistician Nate Silver, investor Frank Thelen, TV presenter Lena Gerke, Douglas CEO Tina Müller, Fashion Designer Magnus Walker, Facebook VP Ads & Business Platform Mark Rabkin and Chief Content Officer at Refinery29 Amy Emmerich.

=== 2017 ===
The OMR Festival 2017 took place on March 2 and 3, 2017 in three halls at the Hamburg Exhibition Center. Over 200 international exhibitors and approximately 26,000 visitors attended the seventh edition of the OMR Festival. Speakers and guests included former Minister of Economics Brigitte Zypries (SPD) from Germany, entrepreneur Gary Vaynerchuk (VaynerMedia), Iron Maiden singer Bruce Dickinson, Youtuber Casey Neistat, old-school German rappers Beginner, Trivago founder Rolf Schrömgens, Facebook executive Andrew Bosworth and Cambridge Analytica CEO Alexander Nix.

=== 2016 ===
In 2016, the OMR Festival took place in two halls at the Hamburg Exhibition Center for the first time. 16,533 trade visitors attended the Conference and Expo on February 25 and 26, 2016. Approximately 4900 Conference attendees saw marketing professor Scott Galloway, skateboard legend Tony Hawk, "My Little Paris" founder Fany Péchiodat, Ströer COO Christian Schmalzl, Growth Hacking expert Neil Patel and musician Jan Delay and Udo Lindenberg speak on stage.

=== 2015 ===
From February 26 to 28, the OMR Conference was expanded to include the OMR Expo, with 50 exhibitors taking part in the format’s first ever rendition. The OMR Conference took place over two days at the Stage Theater im Hafen, while the Expo was held at the Millerntor-Stadion. The Conference and Expo attracted a total of 2500 industry professionals. On stage were, among others, founder mayor of Hamburg Olaf Scholz, digital marketing experts Gary Vaynerchuk, Pinterest founder Evan Sharp, Thales Teixeira, professor for business administration at Harvard School and Benjamin Bak, founder of Lovoo.

=== 2014 ===
In 2014, the Online Marketing Rockstars Conference took place on February 21 at the Stage-Theater im Hafen and was attended by 2000 people. The agenda consisted of 20 speakers, including BuzzFeed founder Jonah Peretti, who spoke for the first time in Germany. Additional speakers included Harvard Business School professor Ben Edelman, legendary German hip-hop trio Fettes Brot, poetry slammer Julia Engelmann, Selfmade Records founder Elvir Ombergovic and John Battelle, founder of Wired magazine.

=== 2013 ===
1200 industry visitors attended the third Online Marketing Rockstars Conference on February 22 at Großen Freiheit 36. Youtuber Sami Slimani, former adviser to US President Barack Obama Julius van de Laar, legendary German musician Jan Delay, Mister Spex managers Mirko Caspar and Harvard Professor Jeffrey Rayport gave presentations on the latest developments and trends in digital marketing.

=== 2012 ===
The second OMR Conference took place on February 24, 2012 at the Große Freiheit 36 venue and was attended by 600 persons. Keynotes were held by Daniel Schiemann, former Marketing service provider of YouPorn, Hamburg Media School professor Dr. Sabine Trepte, Dr. Florian Heinemann (formerly of Rocket Internet) and SEO expert Marcus Tandler.

=== 2011 ===
The inaugural Online Marketing Rockstars Conference was held on February 11, 2011 at the Bucerius Law School in Hamburg. Approximately 200 guests attended the premier event. Speakers on stage included Idealo founder Martin Sinner and founder of upscale matchmaking service ElitePartner Arne Kahlke.
