= Bucerius Law School =

Private law school in Hamburg, Germany

Coordinates: 53°33′34″N 9°58′58″E

- Type: Private law school
- Established: 2000
- Endowment: annual budget of € 17.8 million (2016)
- President: Michael Grünberger
- CEO and Provost: Benedikt Landgrebe
- Faculty: 15 full-time; 2 junior professorships; 4 affiliate professors; 4 honorary professors; 2 emeriti
- Administrative staff: 143 (2013)
- Students: 670 (2017)
- Postgraduates: 44 (2017)
- Doctoral students: 237 (2017)
- Location: Hamburg, Germany
- Campus: Urban
- Address: Jungiusstrasse 6; 20355 Hamburg; Germany
- Colors: bordeaux and white
- Nickname: Butze
- Mascot: Butzemann / Buceria
- Website: www.law-school.de/international

Bucerius Law School (pronounced [buˈtseʁius]) is a private law school located in Hamburg, Germany. The school was the first private school to teach law in Germany.

== History and structure ==
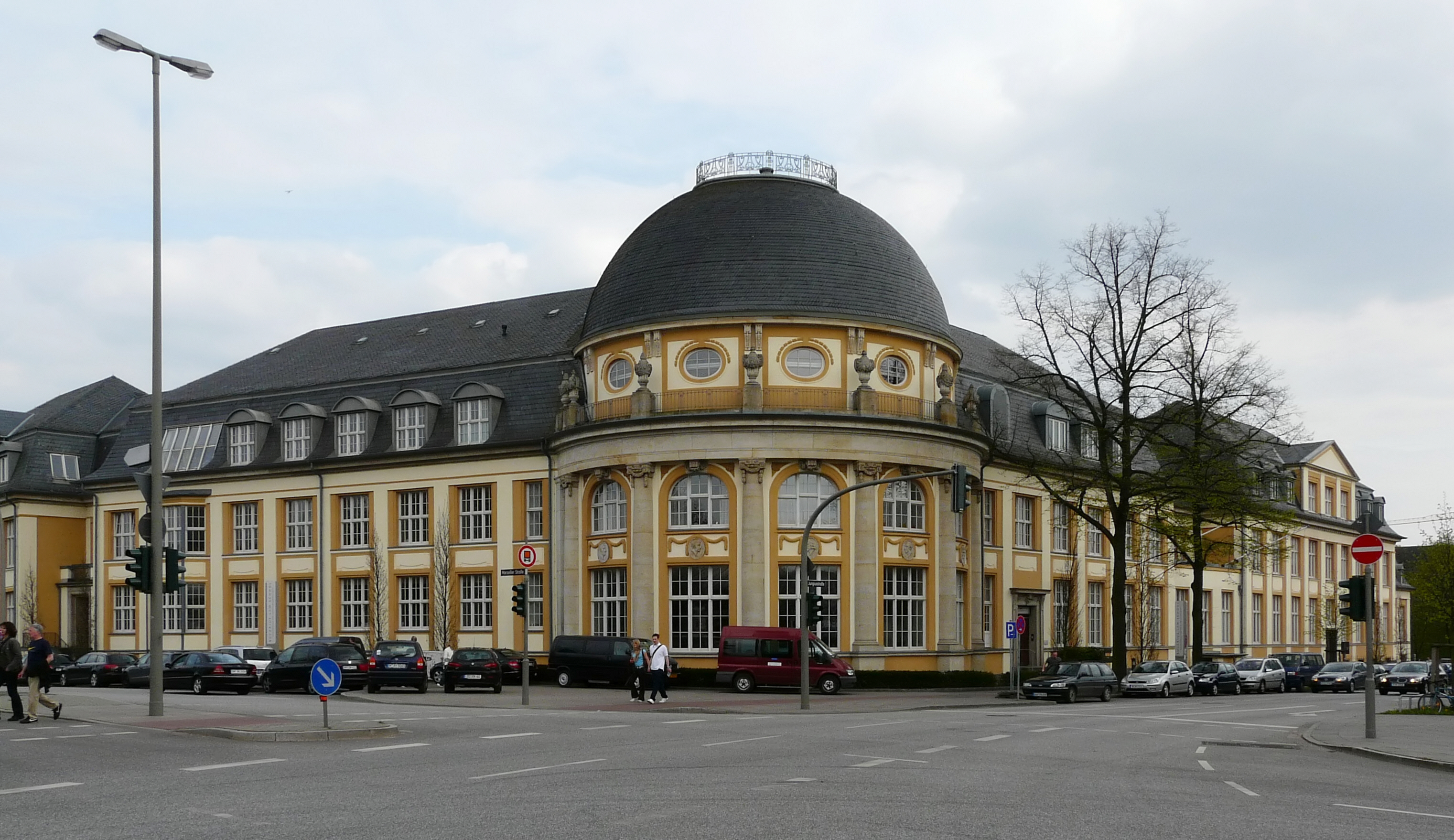
Main rotunda, built in 1906 as the botany department of the University of Hamburg.

Bucerius Law School was founded in 2000 by a non-profit foundation, Zeit-Stiftung Bucerius, and is modelled after law schools in the United States. It was named after Gerd Bucerius, a German judge, attorney, journalist, politician and founding publisher of the German weekly newspaper Die Zeit. The school is organized as a non-profit.

There are specific institutes for corporate and capital market law, the law of foundations and non-profit organizations, dispute resolution, IP and media law, and sustainability.

== Academics ==
=== Programs of study ===
The school offers two different degree programs of study: The general law program, leading to a Bachelor of Laws (LL.B.) and to the German First Judicial Examination (Staatsexamen), and the Master of Law and Business (M.L.B.) program. Moreover, it grants doctoral (Dr. iur.) and habilitation titles, and offers four summer certificate programs.

==== LL.B. and Staatsexamen ====
The three-and-a-half-year LL.B. program is divided into ten trimesters. After its completion, students focus on preparation for the German First Judicial Examination (the regular law degree) in order to be admitted to legal traineeship. The entire program lasts 4.5 to 5 years and includes a mandatory trimester or semester abroad.

Applicants for the LL.B. must take a written exam with an essay and multiple choice components. These tests are created and assessed by an outside evaluator. Based on their scores, selected applicants are invited back for an oral component, including two personal interviews, a prepared presentation, and group discussions. All applicants must demonstrate proficiency in English.

Besides legal education, the school places importance on the required Studium generale as well as an emphasis on foreign languages and economics. Students must complete internships at law firms, businesses or organizations, many of which support the school as donors. Students are also required to spend at least one term abroad and study law in a language other than German. The school has formed international partnerships with more than 100 law schools in 37 countries, including institutions such as Stanford University, Indiana University Maurer School of Law, Columbia University, University of Texas School of Law, the University of Oxford, University of Cambridge, University of York, Cornell University Law School, Georgetown University Law Center, New York University School of Law, Sciences Po, Paris 1 Panthéon-Sorbonne University, The University of Queensland, The University of New South Wales, The University of Sydney, Osgoode Hall, Universität St. Gallen, Singapore Management University, National University of Singapore, ESADE, Victoria University of Wellington and others.

As a private school, Bucerius collects tuition fees for each trimester.

==== LL.M./M.L.B. program ====
The Bucerius Master of Law and Business (LL.M./M.L.B.) is a consecutive Master's degree program. To be eligible for the program, applicants must hold a degree in law, economics, or business. The program aims to provide students with the skills to analyze corporate issues from a legal and economic perspective in an international context. The program is taught in English and is divided into three trimesters. The Fall trimester consists of two course periods, while the second trimester includes one course block and an eight-week internship. The third trimester involves writing a thesis following another course block. The program admits students through a separate admissions test. Students must pay a tuition fee.

==== Other programs ====
Bucerius also offers doctoral and post-doctoral studies.

Bucerius Law School has three Summer Programs: International Business Law, inaugurated in 2008; International Intellectual Property Transactions, offered in cooperation with the University of California College of the Law, San Francisco, since 2014; and Legal Technology and Operations, inaugurated in 2018. The intensive English-taught programs bring together students and professors from around the world to explore the theory and practice of the given topic.

Each fall, about one hundred students from Bucerius' partner universities participate in the International Exchange focusing on International and Comparative Business Law. At the same time of the year, about one hundred students from Bucerius Law School visit the school's partner universities in exchange.

=== Location and facilities ===
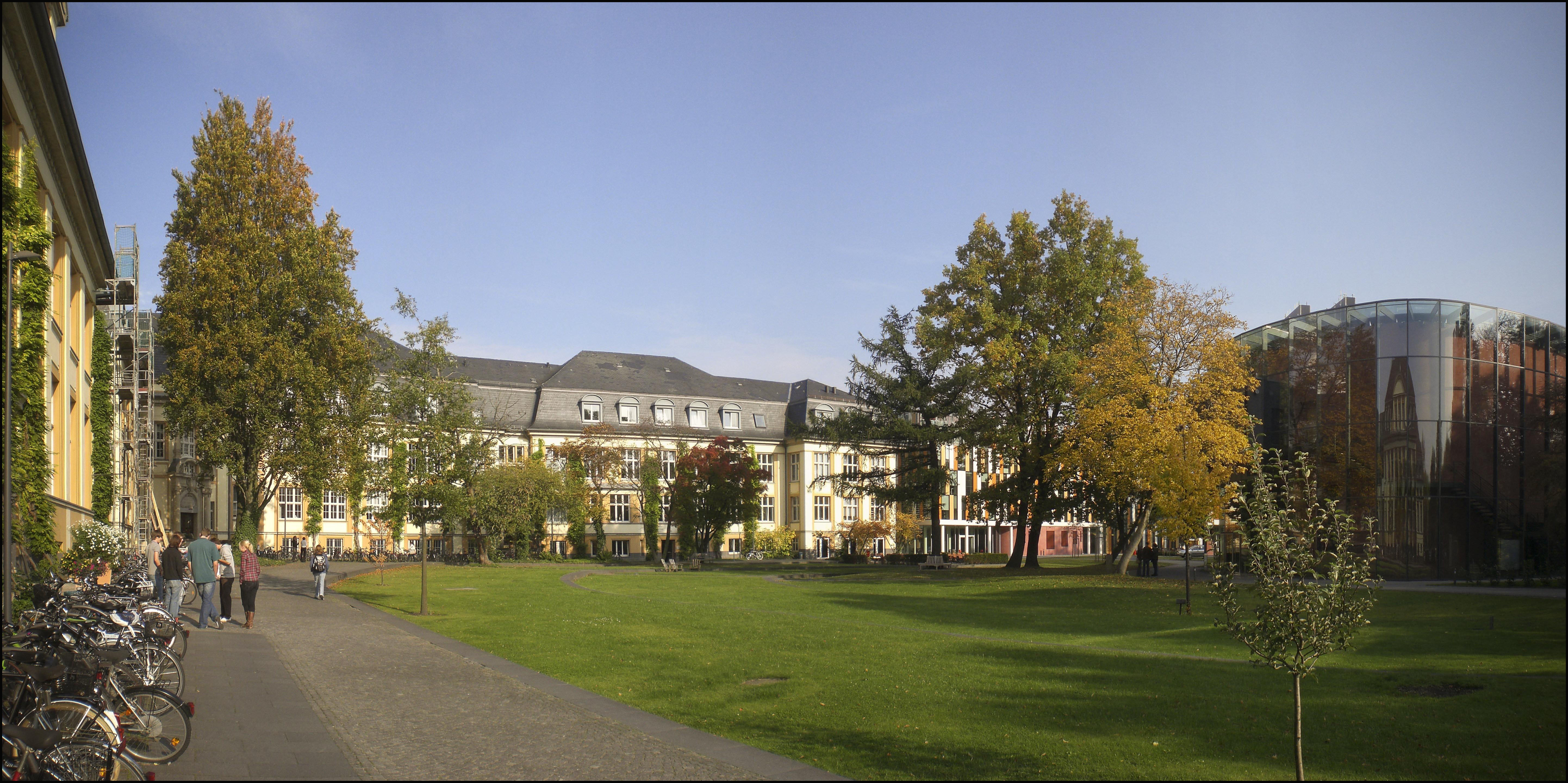
On campus: the Auditorium (right) and the library (background)

Bucerius Law School is located in the city center, near Hamburg's trade exhibition center and the park Planten un Blomen, housed in the former horticulture and botany buildings of the University of Hamburg. The school features a cafeteria. A new library building was added to the eastern side of the main building in 2007. The library is not open to the public. There are several computer labs, a napping room, a theater and an on-campus bilingual (German/English) kindergarten. There is a gym on campus, which students are free to use once an initial registration fee has been paid. On its top floor, Bucerius Law School has separate rooms for students who wish to study in small groups.

== Student life ==
=== Student body ===
In 2023, 8.41% of students at Bucerius received a stipend from the Studienstiftung des deutschen Volkes (transl. German Academic Scholarship Foundation).

=== Extracurricular activities ===
There are two student-run publications: A political magazine called "Politik und Gesellschaft" and the Bucerius Law Journal. There is a choir, orchestra, big band, theater group, Model United Nations society, political student groups, a Phi Delta Phi Inn named after Bucerius Law School's co-founder and honorary president, Professor Karsten Schmidt, and many sports clubs, whose teams compete against other universities in the annual "Champions Trophy". Moot courts are offered in English law, international trade law, public international law, tax law, IP law, criminal and criminal procedural law and labor law.

=== Alumni ===
The Bucerius Alumni Association is the independent association of Bucerius Law School alumni and was founded in March 2004 by the first class of Bachelor graduates. As of September 2021, the association has over 1,800 members; over 90% of the graduates of each class join the association after their Bachelor’s degree.

The association represents a network of former students, academic staff and participants of the International Program. It organizes an annual graduate fair, an alumni dinner and various professional events. In addition, there are seven regional groups, three of which are located abroad, as well as various specialist and interest groups, which meet regularly for lectures and exchanges.
