= Radisson Blu Hotel Hamburg =

Hotel in Hamburg, Germany

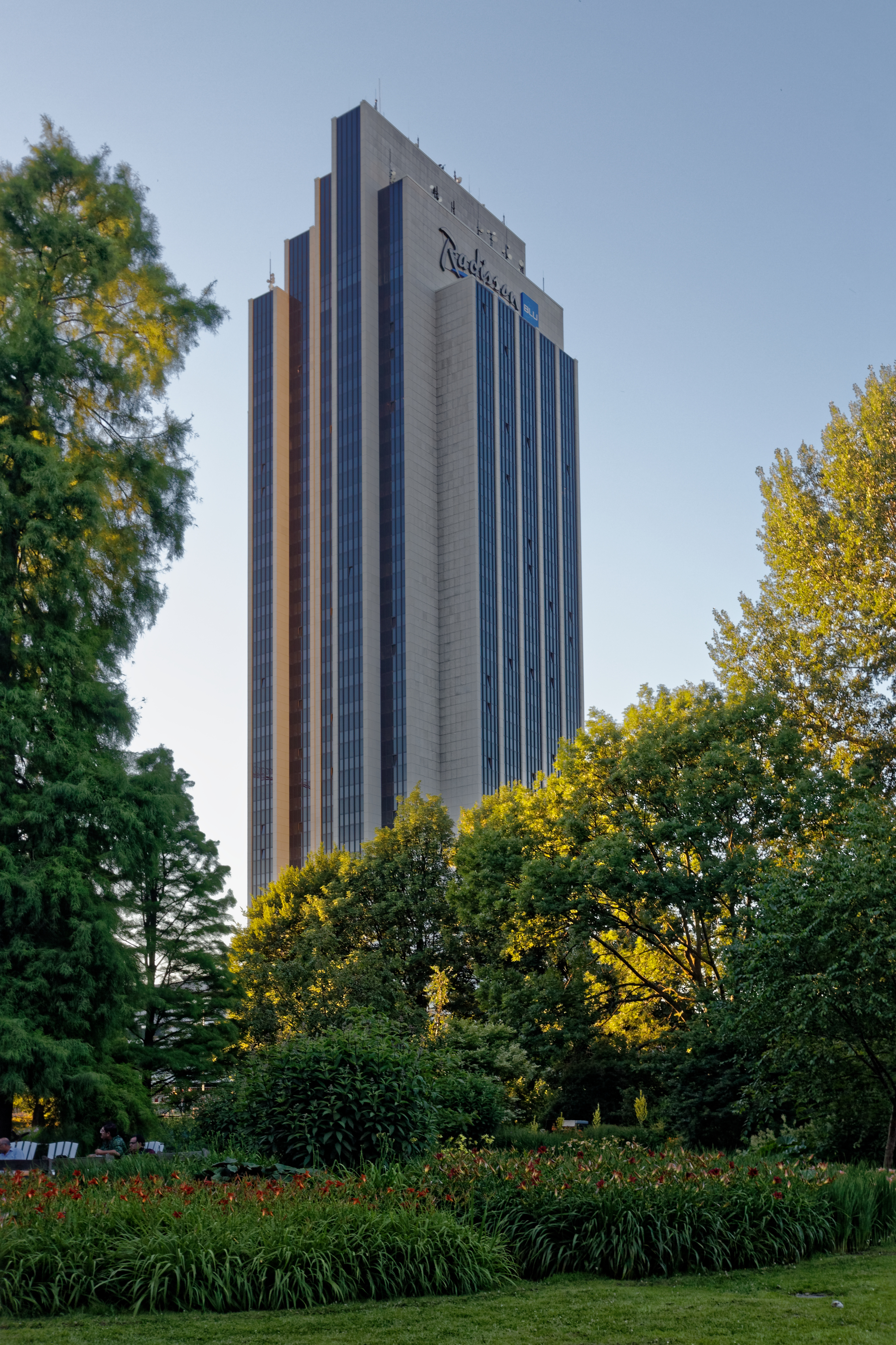
- Aerial view of Radisson Blu Hotel Hamburg
- Interactive map of the Radisson Blu Hotel Hamburg area

General information
- Location: Hamburg, Germany, Marseiller Straße 2
- Coordinates: 53°33′42″N 9°59′13″E
- Opening: April 1973; 52 years ago
- Owner: Wenaasgruppen
- Management: Radisson Hotel Group

Height
- Roof: 108 m (354 ft)

Technical details
- Floor count: 32

Design and construction
- Architect: Jost Schramm; Gert Pempelfort

Other information
- Number of rooms: 556
- Facilities: 2,122 m² conference area

Website
- www.radissonhotels.com/en-us/hotels/radisson-blu-hamburg

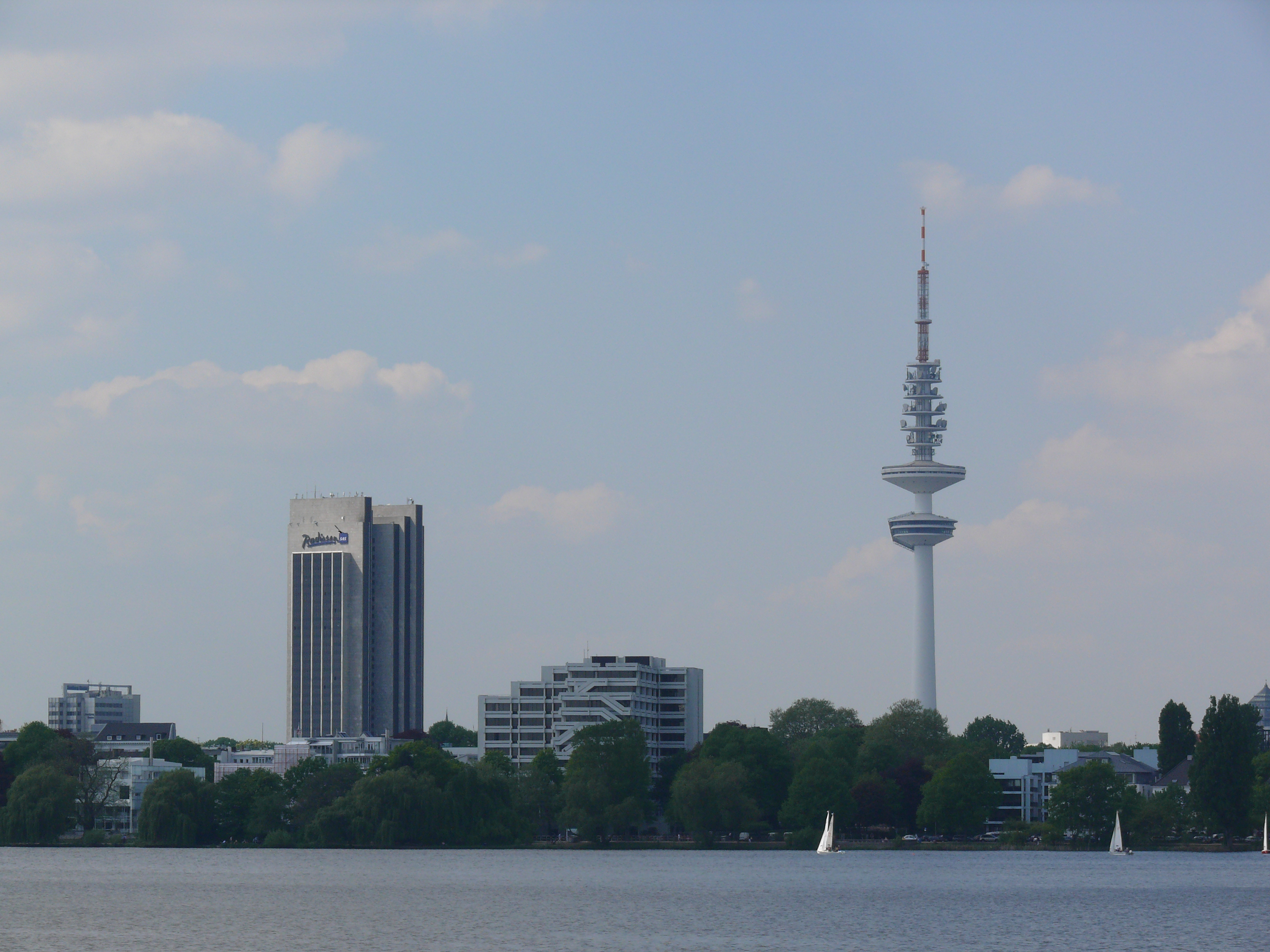
Radisson Blu Hotel (left) and Heinrich-Hertz-Turm, seen across the Außenalster

Radisson Blu Hotel Hamburg is a hotel in Hamburg, Germany operated by Radisson Hotels under the Radisson Blu brand. At 108 meters, it is the tallest hotel in Hamburg and is on the list of tallest buildings in Hamburg and the list of tallest buildings in Germany.

It has 32 floors and 556 rooms. The hotel is at the edge of the Planten un Blomen park and is connected to the Congress Center Hamburg and near Hamburg Dammtor station. The hotel also has 2,122 m^{2} of meeting space in 12 conference rooms on a separate floor.

== History ==
The hotel was designed by architects Jost Schramm and Gert Pempelfort. Construction began in 1970 and the hotel opened in April 1973 as Loews Hamburg Plaza. It was renamed Hamburg Plaza Hotel when it was managed by Canadian Pacific Hotels.

In 1988, it was acquired by SAS Group and renamed the SAS Hamburg Plaza Hotel. When SAS Group's SAS International Hotels created a co-brand with Radisson Hotels, it was renamed Radisson SAS Hamburg Hotel.

In October 2009, a €48 million renovation of the hotel was completed.

In November 2009, a European hotel fund managed by Invesco acquired the hotel for €155 million. The hotel was renamed the Radisson Blu Hotel Hamburg in 2009.

In November 2015, Azure acquired the hotel.

In March 2017, Wenaasgruppen acquired the hotel.

== In popular culture ==
The final episodes of the ZDF television series Timm Thaler were filmed at the hotel.

== See also ==
- List of hotels in Germany
