= Sievekingplatz =

Public square in Hamburg, Germany

Coordinates: 53°33′23″N 9°58′40″E

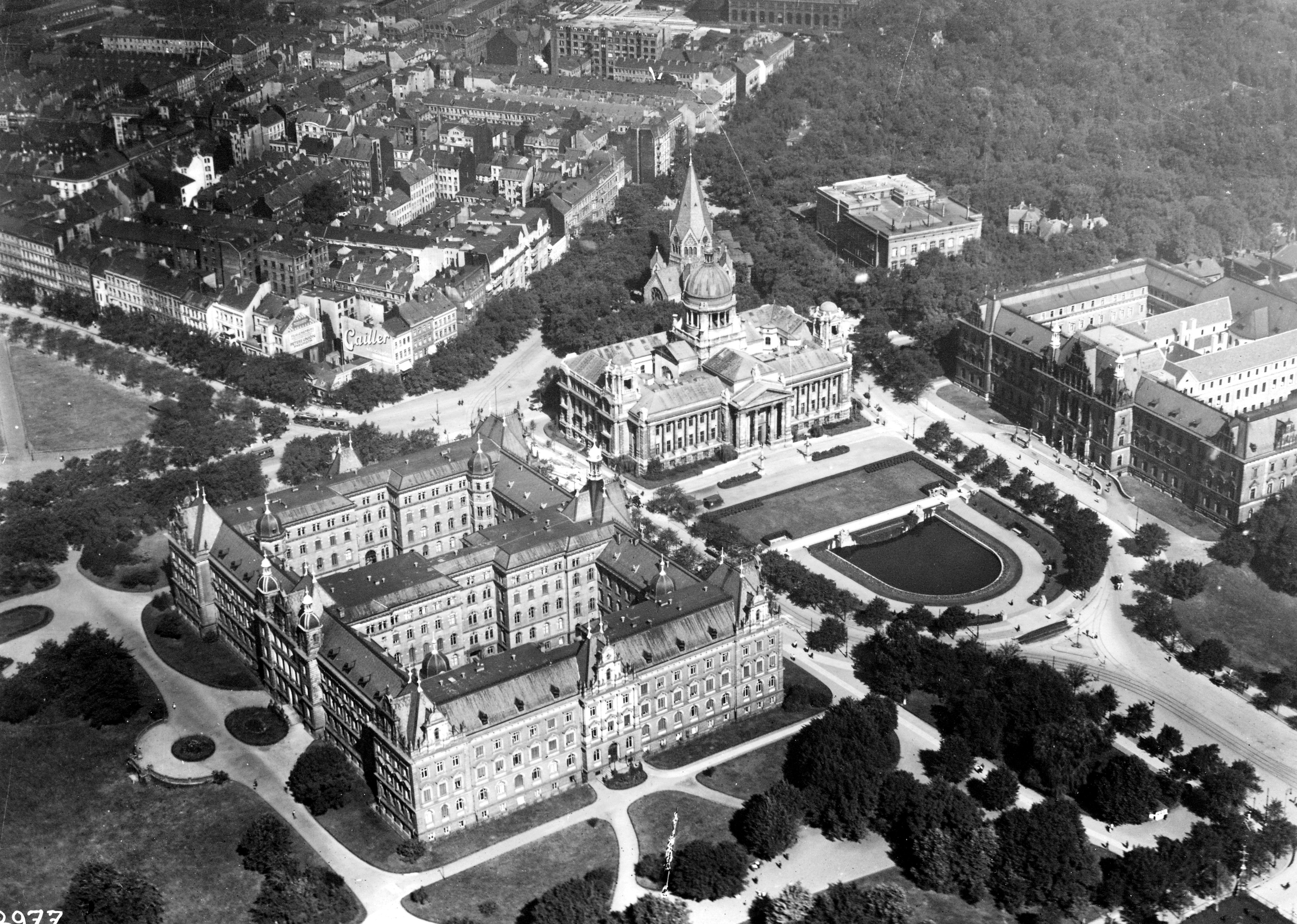
Oblique aerial photography from 1920. The photo was taken looking approximately north.

Sievekingplatz is a central square in Hamburg, Germany, located in the quarter of St. Pauli in the Hamburg-Mitte district within the Wallanlagen, the remnants of the Hamburg Wallring.

== History ==
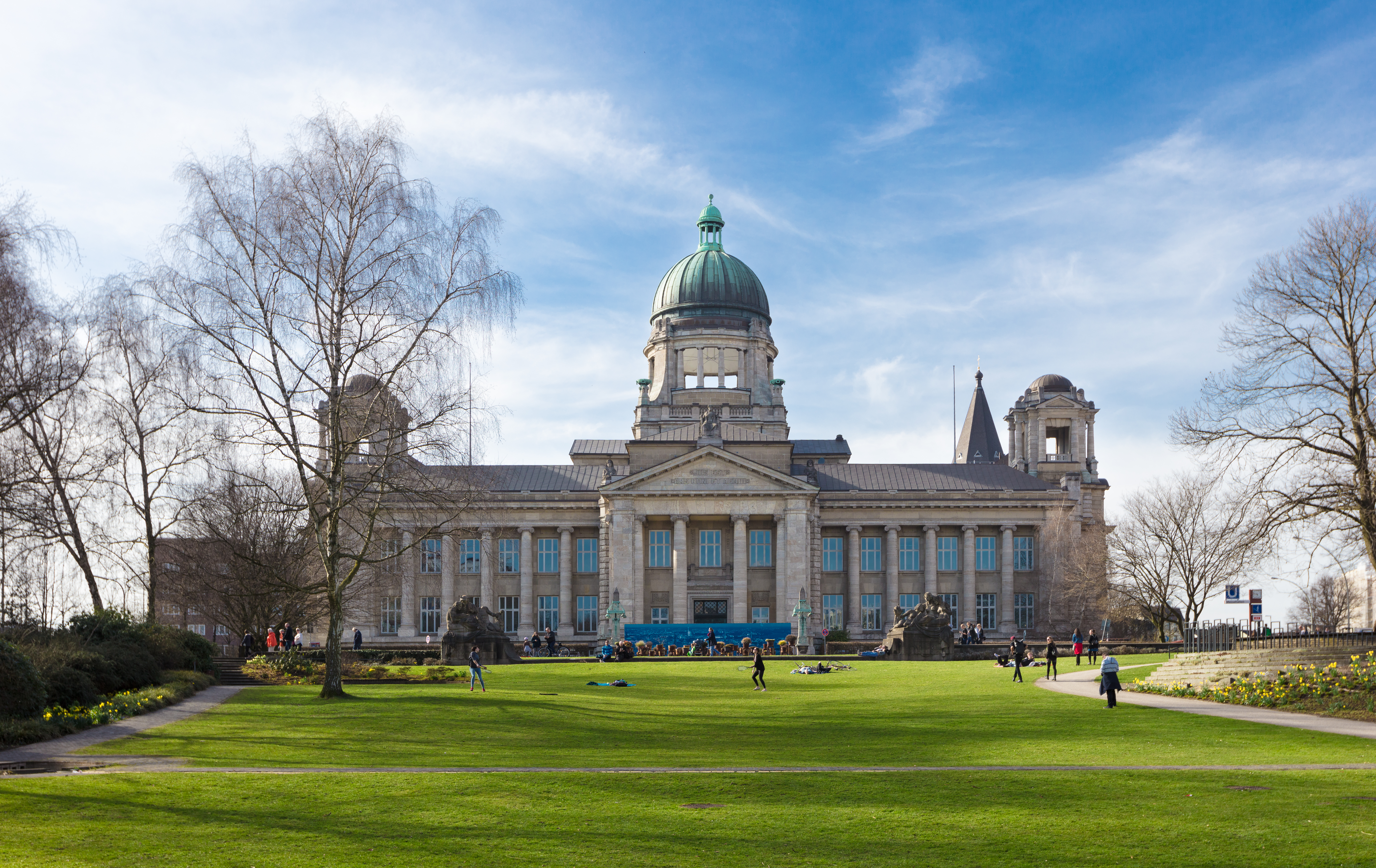
Modern day photo. Signage for the Messehallen U-Bahn station is visible on the right.

The square was named in 1911 after Ernst Friedrich Sieveking, who was president of the Hanseatisches Oberlandesgericht, the Higher Regional Court of Hamburg from 1879 to 1909. The Higher Regional Court building, which was built from 1907 to 1912, is located at the square, along with the criminal justice building (1898-1912) and the criminal justice building (1879-1882) the buildings form the Judicial Forum.
