= Messehallen station =

Railway station in Hamburg, Germany

Messehallen
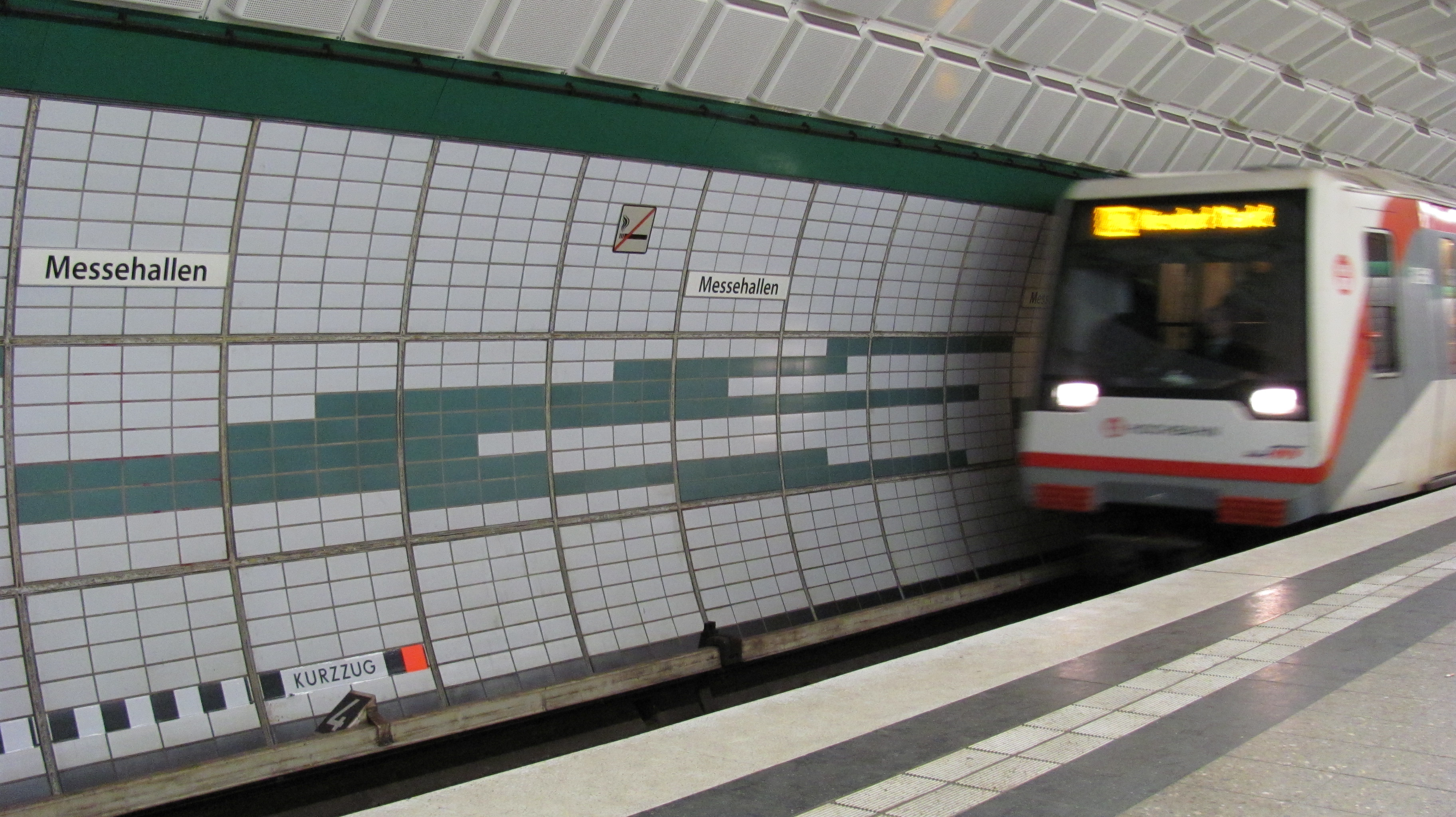

General information
- Location: Sievekingplatz; 20355 Hamburg, Germany
- Coordinates: 53°33′28″N 09°58′36″E
- System: Hamburg U-Bahn station
- Operator: Hamburger Hochbahn AG
- Line: U2
- Platforms: 2 side platforms
- Tracks: 2
- Connections: Bus, Taxi

Construction
- Structure type: Underground
- Depth: 26 m (85 ft)
- Accessible: Yes

Other information
- Station code: HHA: MH
- Fare zone: HVV: A/000

History
- Opened: 31 May 1970

Services
Preceding station	Hamburg U-Bahn	Following station
Schlump towards Niendorf Nord	U2	Gänsemarkt towards Mümmelmannsberg
Location
- Location within Hamburg Location within Schleswig-Holstein Location within Germany Location within Europe

Messehallen is a metro station located at Messehallen and Congress Center Hamburg on the border of the two Hamburg districts St. Pauli and Neustadt. The station was opened in 1970, and is served by Hamburg U-Bahn line U2.

== Layout ==
Messehallen is Germany's deepest underground station at 26 metres (85 ft) below ground.

Entrances above ground are located at Karolinenstraße and Sievekingplatz, leading to spacious intermediate levels. The two side platforms are placed back-to-back in a 7 metres (23 ft) diameter railway pipe each, with access at either ends and intermediate connectors at a couple of locations, effectively making them one island platform.

== Service ==
Messehallen is served by Hamburg U-Bahn line U2; departures are every 5 minutes.

== Gallery ==
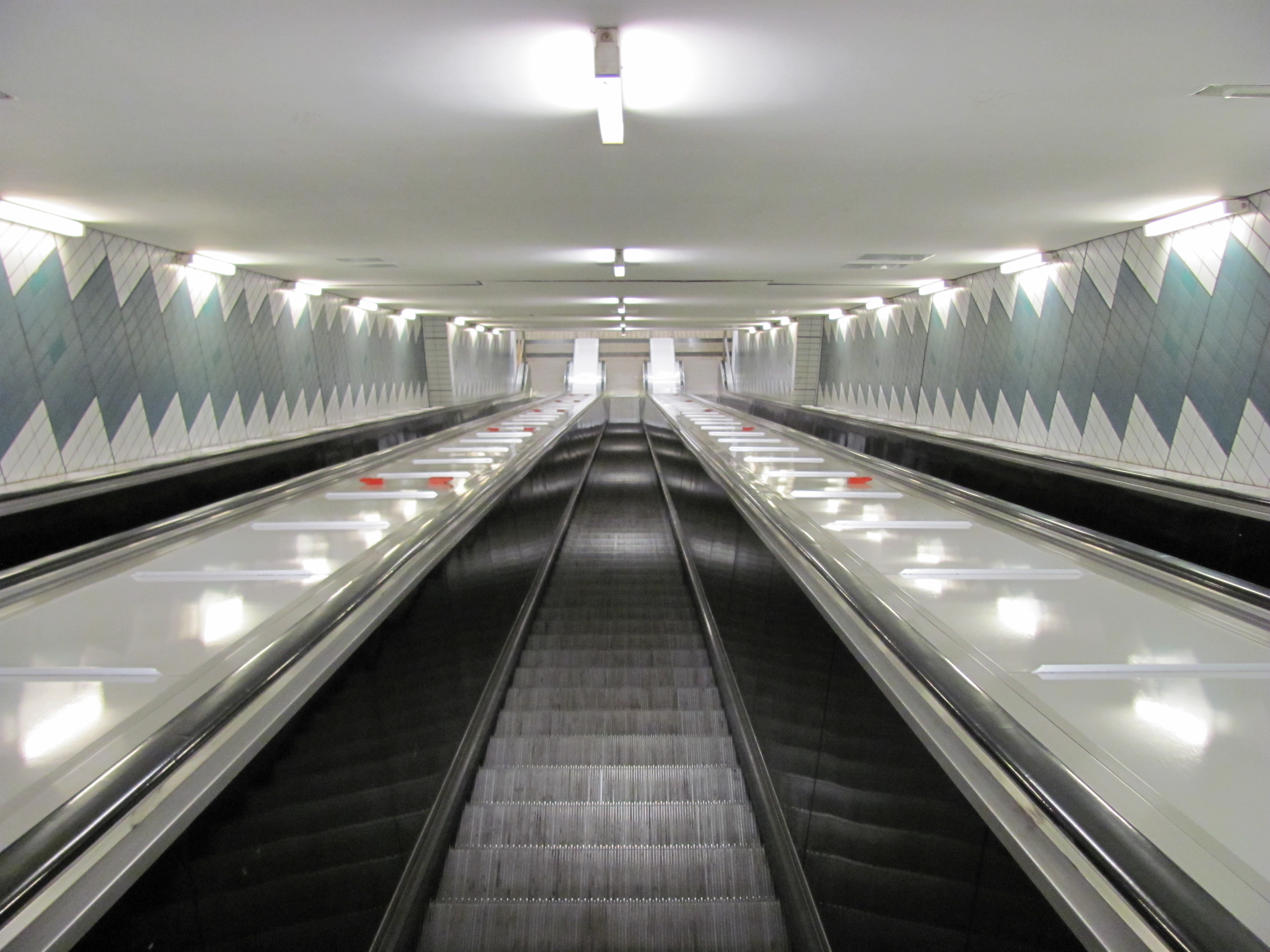
The station's escalators have a height of 22 meters

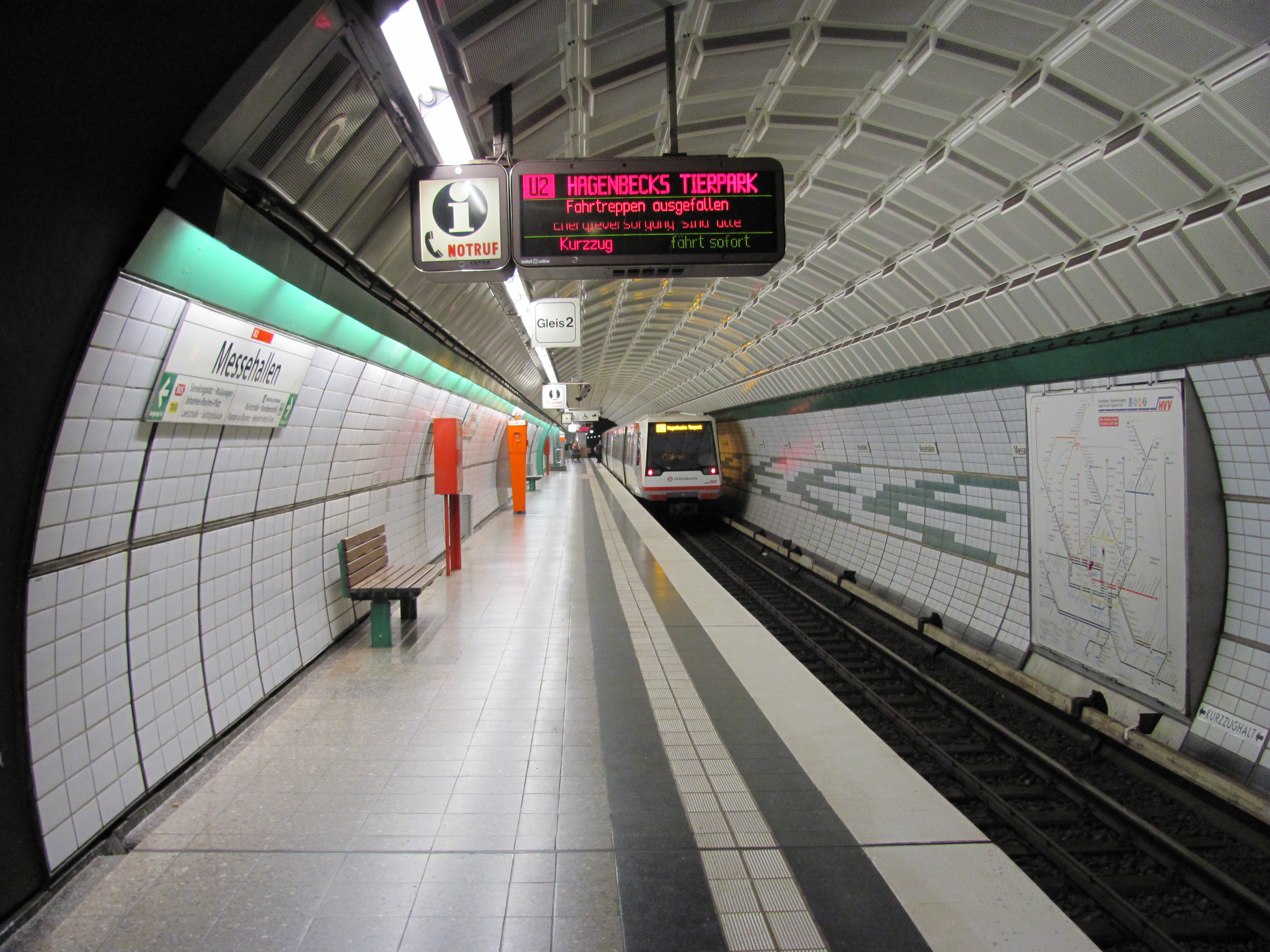

== See also ==
- List of Hamburg U-Bahn stations
