= Constitutional Court of Hamburg =

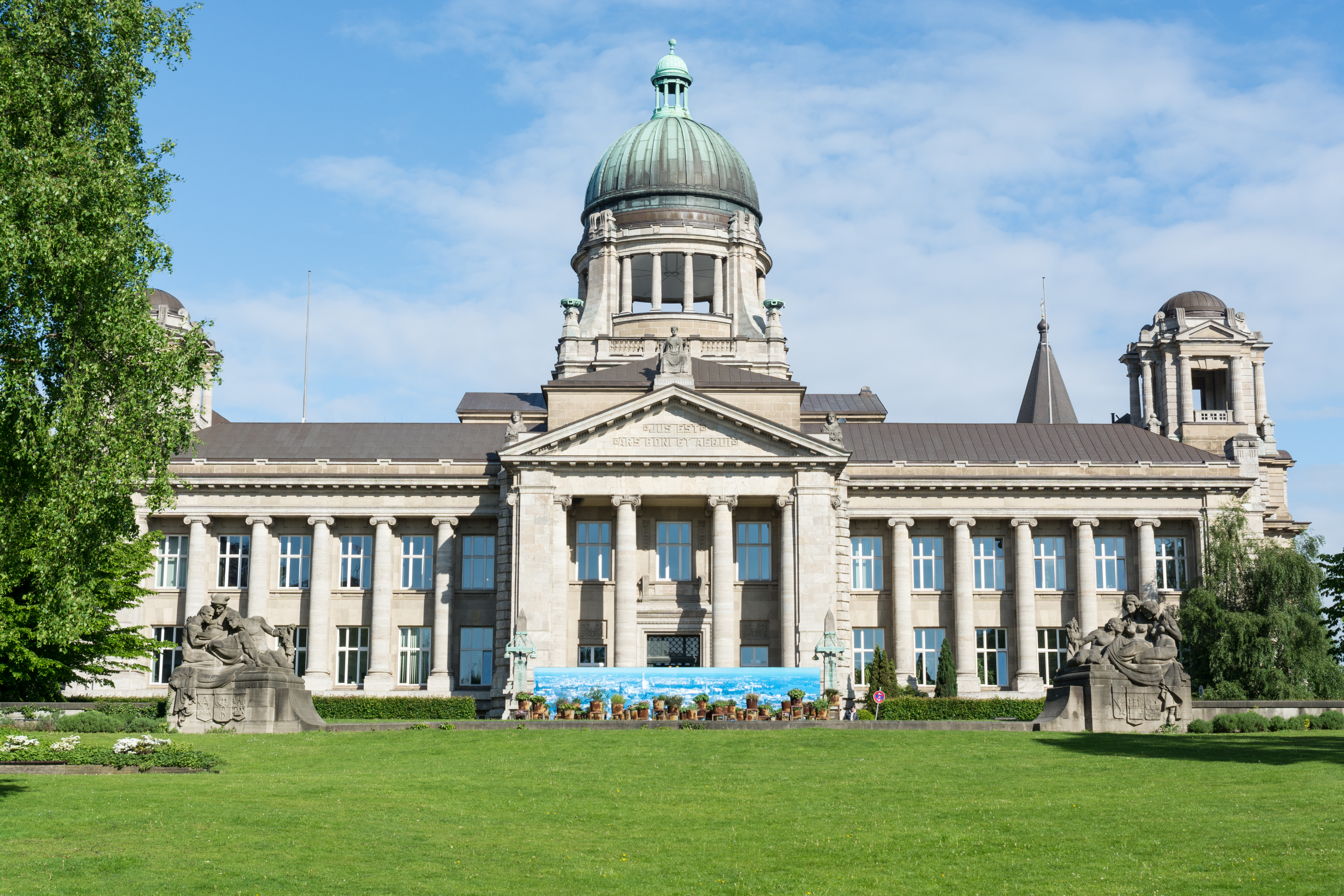
The Hamburg Constitutional Court is also located in the OLG building on Sievekingplatz.

The Constitutional Court of Hamburg is the constitutional court of the Free and Hanseatic City of Hamburg, the highest court and one of the three constitutional bodies of this state. The court is located in the building of the Hanseatic Higher Regional Court in Justizforum Hamburg at Sievekingplatz. Birgit Voßkühler has been President of the Court since February 2020. She is the first woman to hold this office.

== Responsibilities ==
The jurisdiction is limited to the classic types of proceedings of a state court. There is no system for Constitutional complaints in Hamburg. The responsibilities arise from Article 65 of the Constitution of the Free and Hanseatic City of Hamburg and Section 14 of the Law on the Hamburg Constitutional Court. The most important types of procedure are the disputes between the constitutional organs of the state, the abstract review of norms concerning the compatibility of legal norms with the state constitution, the concrete review of norms at the request of a court regarding the constitutionality of a law or a legal regulation, the electoral review complaint in elections to the Hamburg Parliament and the district assemblies as well as decisions in disputes regarding the implementation of referendums and popular votes within the framework of Hamburg's popular legislation.

== Composition of the Hamburg Constitutional Court ==
Birgit Voßkühler has been President of the Hamburg Constitutional Court since 2020; in her main position, she is Vice President of the State Labor Court of Hamburg.

== History ==
The Hamburg Constitutional Court was established in 1953 in accordance with the State Constitution of 6 June 1952 and the Law on the Hamburg Constitutional Court of 2 October 1953 and celebrated its 50th anniversary in October 2003, having handled almost 120 cases at that time, with the number increasing. A further area of responsibility arose with the introduction of popular legislation at the state level in 1996.

A different predecessor with a limited scope of duties was the Hamburg State Court (according to the law of 19 May 1926), which, according to Article 49 of the Constitution (of 7 January 1921), had to decide on members of the Senate who had knowingly or through gross negligence violated the Constitution or a law. A different predecessor with a limited scope of duties was the Hamburg State Court (according to the law of 19 May 1926), which, according to Article 49 of the Constitution (of 7 January 1921), had to decide on members of the Senate who had knowingly or through gross negligence violated the Constitution or a law.

Birgit Voßkühler has been president since 2020 and is the first woman in the position.

== Head of the Hamburg Constitutional Court ==
Until 1984, "triple presidencies" were required by law in Hamburg. Therefore, the president of the Hanseatic Higher Regional Court was also President of the Hamburg Higher Administrative Court and the Hamburg Constitutional Court. Das änderte sich erst mit der Verabschiedung von Walter Stiebeler im November 1984. Nun bekam das Hamburgische Oberverwaltungsgericht und im Jahr 2007 auch das Hamburgische Verfassungsgericht einen eigenen Präsidenten.

Gerd Harder was also the presiding judge at the Hanseatic Higher Regional Court, Joachim Pradel was the presiding judge at the Hamburg Higher Administrative Court, and Friedrich-Joachim Mehmel was the president of the Hamburg Higher Administrative Court. Birgit Voßkühler is the first woman in the position, is also the vice president of the Hamburg Regional Labor Court, and thus, the first president from the field of labor courts.

- 1953–1960: Herbert Ruscheweyh
- 1960–1965: Hans Görtz
- 1965–1969: Reinhart Vogler
- 1969–1984: Walter Stiebeler
- 1985–1994: Helmut Plambeck
- 1994–2007: Wilhelm Rapp
- 2007–2012: Gerd Harder
- 2012–2016: Joachim Pradel
- 2016–2020: Friedrich-Joachim Mehmel
- seit 2020: Birgit Voßkühler

== Prominent cases ==
As part of an electoral review procedure for the 1991 Hamburg state election, the Hamburg Constitutional Court declared the election invalid on 4 May 1993 and ordered a new election for the first time in the history of the Federal Republic of Germany due to serious democratic deficits in the Hamburg CDU's candidate nomination process (1993 Hamburg state election ).

On October 13, 2016, the Hamburg Constitutional Court stopped the referendum "Save the Referendum" in proceedings pursuant to Article 65, Paragraph 3, No. 5 of the Constitution of the Free and Hanseatic City of Hamburg.

The Constitutional Court stopped a referendum on Universal basic income.

In 2024, The Constitutional Court allowed a referendum on banning advertising.

== See also ==
- Clara Klabunde
