= Hanseatisches Oberlandesgericht =

German Higher Regional Court

Hanseatic Higher Regional Court
- Hanseatisches Oberlandesgericht
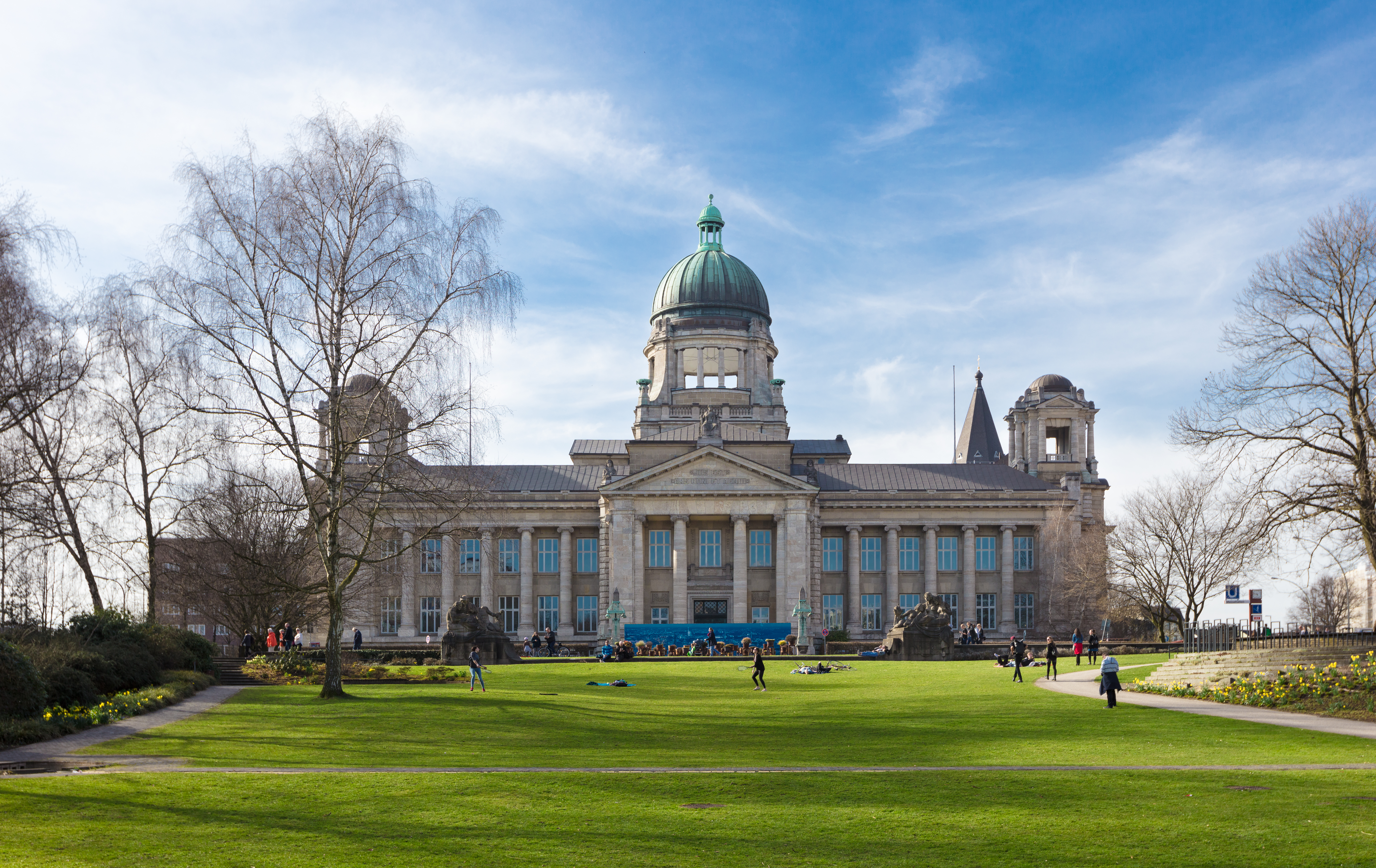
- Court building
- Interactive map of Hanseatic Higher Regional Court
- 53.5569°N 9.9765°E
- Jurisdiction: Hamburg, Germany
- Location: Sievekingplatz, Hamburg
- Coordinates: 53.5569°N 9.9765°E
- Authorised by: Gerichtsverfassungsgesetz
- Website: justiz.hamburg.de/gerichte/oberlandesgericht

President
- Currently: Marc Tully

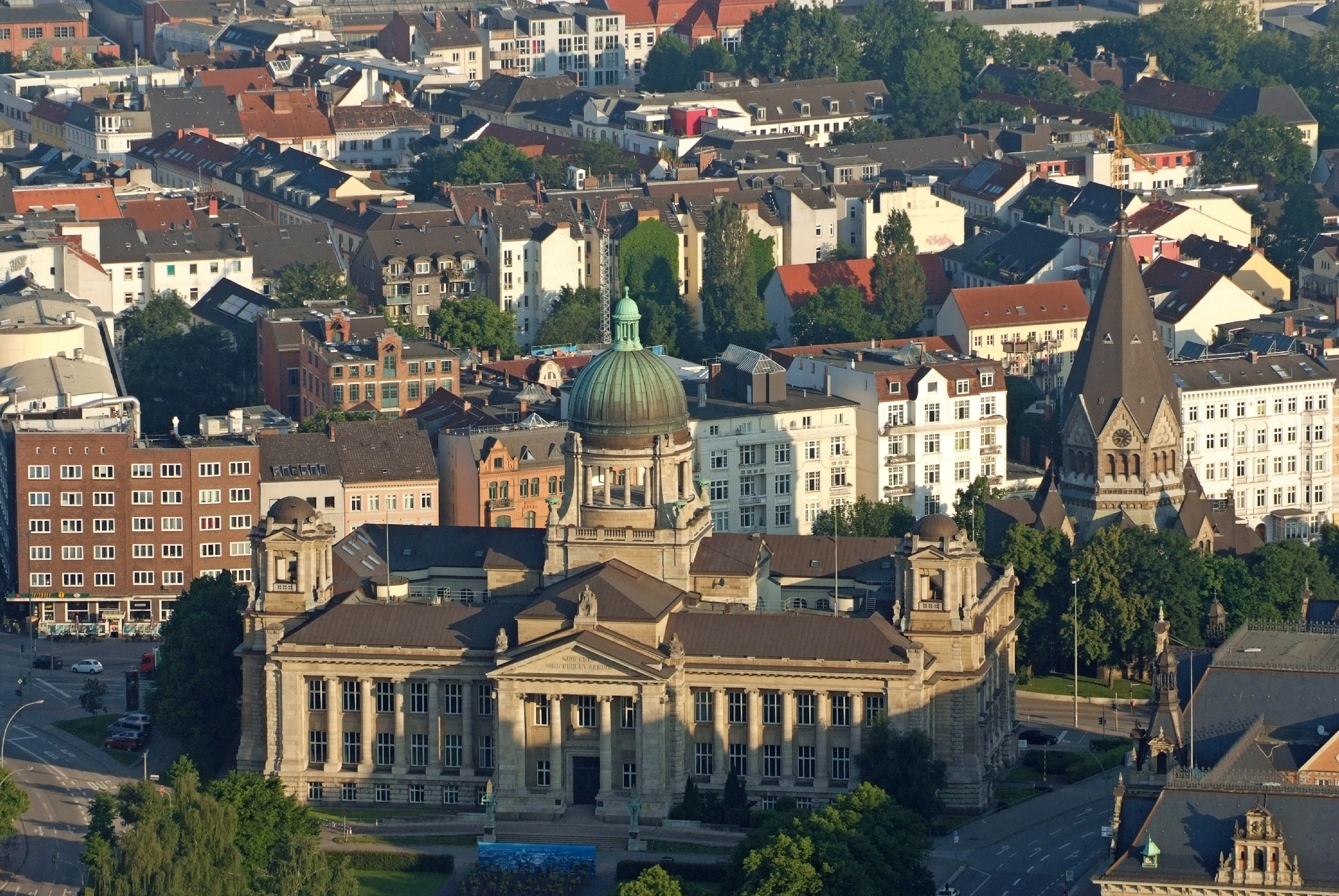
Aerial view 2013

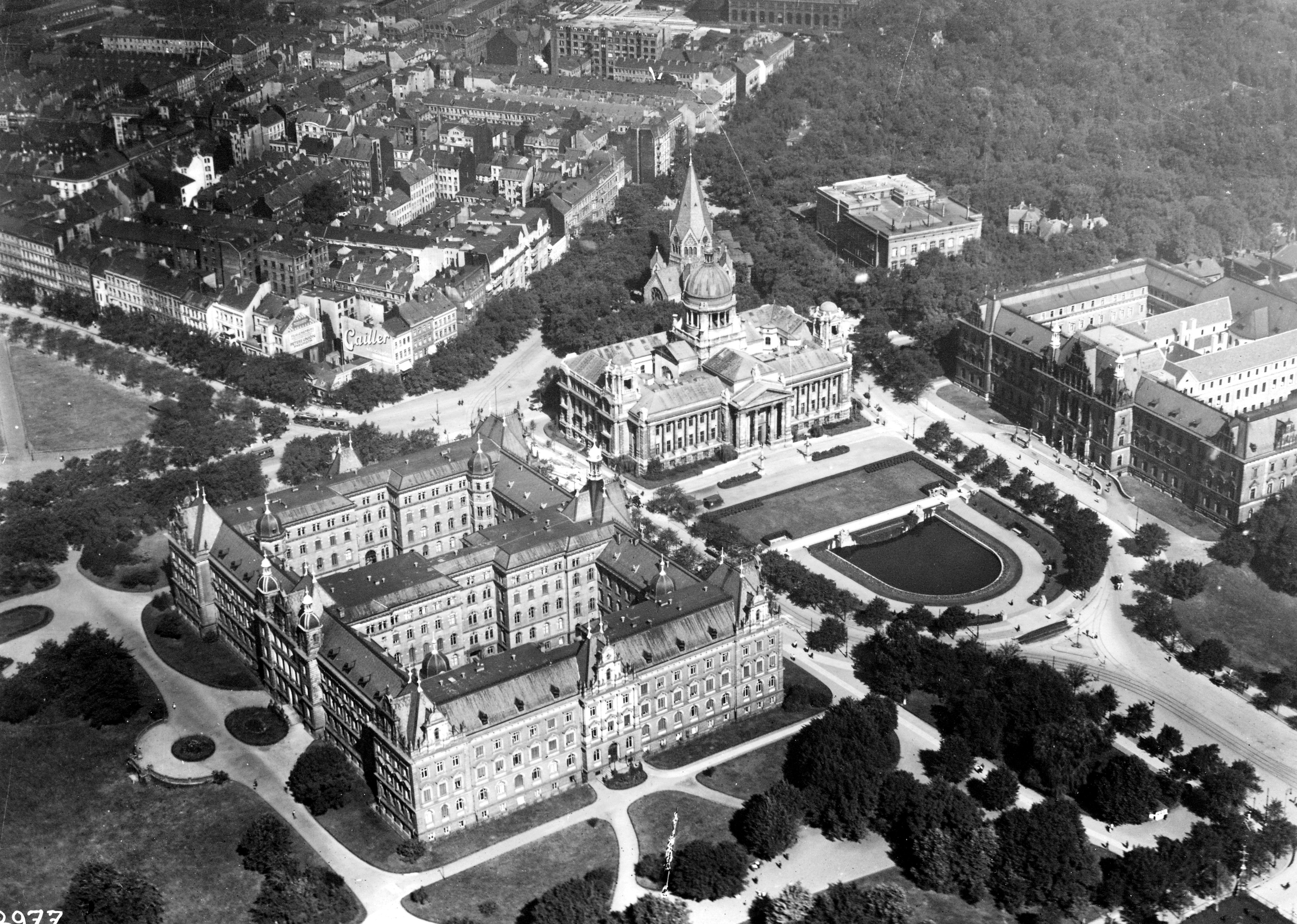
Aerial view 1920

The Hanseatisches Oberlandesgericht (Hanseatic Higher Regional Court, abbreviated HansOLG or OLG Hamburg, officially without a suffix "Hamburg") is the Higher Regional Court (OLG) of the Free and Hanseatic City of Hamburg, Germany, and thus part of the Hamburg ordinary jurisdiction. It is located at the square of Sievekingplatz in the St. Pauli quarter. The square is named after the first president of the OLG, Ernst Friedrich Sieveking.

== History and judicial district ==
Originally the court was opened on 1 October 1879 as a joint "Oberappellationsgericht" for the Free Imperial Cities Bremen, Hamburg and Lübeck. Its predecessor was the Oberappellationsgericht der vier Freien Städte, the joint Supreme Appeal Court of the four free cities of Germany, Lübeck, Frankfurt, Bremen and Hamburg, which was founded in 1820 and based in Lübeck.

Lübeck lost its independence with the Greater Hamburg Act of 1937, became a part of Schleswig-Holstein and thus fell within the jurisdiction of the then OLG Kiel. In 1947, Bremen received its own higher regional court, which in contrast to the Hamburg-based is called "Hanseatic Higher Regional Court Bremen".

The district of the Hanseatic Higher Regional Court (of Hamburg) comprises the territory of the Free and Hanseatic City of Hamburg, with the exception of the area, which is incorporated by the State Treaty on the regulation of coastal waters and the Elbe estuary in the district court districts Cuxhaven and Wilhelmshaven, according to § 15 of the Hamburg Act on the Execution of the Judicature Act of 31 May 1965.

On 17 December 1970, the Hanseatic Higher Regional Court was also given the jurisdiction as a court of first instance in state protection criminal cases for the territory of the Free Hanseatic City of Bremen, it was transferred in accordance with § 120 para. 5 S. 2 GVG (Judicature Act).

In cases regarding river transport, since 31 March 1984, the Hanseatic Higher Regional Court is as Maritime Court also responsible for the appeals and complaints against the decisions of the jurisdiction of the States of Lower Saxony, Schleswig-Holstein and the Free Hanseatic City of Bremen Maritime Courts. The state of Mecklenburg-Vorpommern transferred this responsibility to the Hanseatic Higher Regional Court on 17 June 1994.

Since 8 June 2012, the Hanseatic Higher Regional Court is also responsible for the territory of the state of Schleswig-Holstein as a court of first instance in state protection criminal matters. The same applies since 30 June 2012 for the territory of the state of Mecklenburg-Vorpommern.

In the district of the Hanseatic Higher Regional Court, 10,386 lawyers and attorneys-at-law (as of 1 January 2018) are admitted.

== Architecture of the courthouse ==
The 1912 completed court building Sievekingplatz 2 of the architects Lundt & Kallmorgen forms, along with the civil justice building and the criminal justice building, the Judicial Forum on Sievekingplatz and is also the seat of the Hamburg Constitutional Court. The three buildings are listed.
