= Clara Klabunde =

German lawyer

Clara Klabunde (1906–1994) was a German lawyer and the first German in the rank of a court president.

Klaubunde was born on 30 December 1906 in Hamburg.

On 1 December 1952 she became the first woman at the court to take the post of Regional Labor Court Director of the newly established Third Chamber at the Hamburg Labor Court. Klabunde also had the adjunct in the disciplinary council for judges and since 1953, belonged to the Hamburg Constitutional Court. On 1 September 1966 she called the Hamburg Senate to the President of the State Labor Court thus being the first woman in Germany to reach such a position.

She died on 7 July 1994 in Hamburg.
