= Charles S. Klabunde =

American artist (1935–2024)

Charles S. Klabunde (October 1, 1935 – June 20, 2024) was an American artist whose work has been characterized both as existential realism and as fantastical symbolism.

== Life and career ==
Klabunde was born in Omaha, Nebraska. He began drawing as a young boy. Because he was learning disabled, his parents encouraged him to become a house painter. It never occurred to anyone, including Klabunde, that art would become his career.

After high school, Klabunde studied drafting at the Omaha Technical School. When he completed the program, he went to work for his grandfather, an engineer, as a surveyor for a new housing development. Klabunde had no plans to attend college until a co-worker his own age persuaded him to enroll. Klabunde earned his B.F.A. in 1958 from the University of Nebraska and then attended graduate school at the University of Iowa, earning his M.F.A. in 1962. While at Iowa, he met the Argentine printmaker, Mauricio Lasansky, who encouraged him to build a career as an etcher.

In 1965 Klabunde moved to Edgewater, New Jersey, and working as a designer of interiors - classrooms and labs - for NYU. In 1967, he found an apartment in Greenwich Village and was able to open his first studio.

One of his first commissions was from Lublin Graphics, which led to shows at local galleries. Soon, about 30 galleries were carrying his work. Museums, too, were receptive to his work. The first to purchase one of his pieces was the Metropolitan Museum of Art.

In 1971, he received a Guggenheim Fellowship.

Klabunde died June 20, 2024, at the age of 88.

== Art ==
Klabunde was a prolific printmaker and painter. His prints were made on a custom-made English press using four-color, hand-engraved copper plates, which produces contours and colors with an antique appearance. He mixed his own ink and hand-pulls each print.

Victoria Donohoe, writing in The Philadelphia Inquirer, described Klabunde as an artist who elevates printmaking because he takes great interest in exploiting the special qualities that make etching an expressive medium with unique characteristics rather than using it, say, only as a method of reproducing pencil drawings. He knows well how to handle the thin transparent scrims of color upon color, and he introduces patterned materials such as lace to obtain the surface quality he wants. His color sense and a story-telling bias distinguish him.

The artist tended to focus on a subject and then create a series of works around it. While he generally drew inspiration from biblical or mythological themes, he was also inspired by African and other tribal art.

His collections included:

- Studies in Greek Mythology: Flesh & Stone Paintings - a series of 10
- Shadows & Ceremonies - a series of 36 pencil drawings and 30 oil paintings celebrating masked African and New Guinea tribal ceremonial dancers and portraits of the faces behind the masks.
- Passion of Christ - A series of 8 etchings and pencil drawings
- Angels Without Gods - A series of 10 oil paintings and 12 pencil drawings
- Empty-ness of Laughter - A series of 13 oil paintings and pencil drawings based on a study of prisoners in Louisiana.

=== Early work ===
In style, his early drawings, and prints could be described as fantasy art. They could also be described as a cross between the woodcuts of Albrecht Dürer and illustrations for Grimm's Fairy Tales. He creates symbolic vignettes using Medieval or Renaissance figures and settings, to which the viewer may apply his own interpretations.

Klabunde's black-and-white or color etchings featured highly complex imagery. What seem at first to be simple fantasy pictures are much more.

Many of the artist's etchings include Gothick elements (such as Hellmouths, gargoyles, and elaborate tracery) and imaginative or improbable depictions (such as acrobats dangling from ropes presumably suspended on skyhooks, and cablecars with dragons on their roofs). Other works, such as Icarus and The Puppeteer, are more technical in nature, featuring unexpected arrangements of a limited number of figures.

=== Later work ===
While many artists employ drawings either as preliminary studies for paintings or separate statements, Klabunde's are both. While serving to guide the compositions of his large oils on canvas, they are also finished statements in their own right.

Klabunde is sometimes compared to Francis Bacon, as the two artists share an ability to create the sense of an encounter with a palpable human presence placed in a frontal pose at the center of the composition, invariably against dark backgrounds that cast the figures in stark relief. While Bacon assaults the viewer with the visceral jolt of seeing the human image flayed like a side of beef, Klabunde confronts us with the culture shock of a spiritual tradition far different from our own.

By 2002, Klabunde had moved from inner demons and internal fantasies toward a new affirmation of life. This was a natural consequence of his move away from nihilism and existentialism, toward spiritual transcendence. From this point, the bodies he rendered exemplified ideals of beauty in the majestic series of very large pencil drawing poetically entitled Burned by the Fire of Our Dreams.

=== European box books ===
Klabunde has created etchings and engravings for four books. Each is printed on B.F.K. Rieves paper and boxed in clothbound deluxe European box books.

- Cycle of Sangsaric Phenomena: The Tibetan Book of the Dead (1967)
- The Seven Deadly Sins (1971)
- Samuel Beckett's The Lost Ones (1984)
- Studies of the Revolutionary Mind (2000)

In each series, Klabunde's images illuminate, rather than merely illustrate, the texts. In the etching Cycle of Sangsaric Phenomena #III, for example, the mystical qualities of the Tibetan Book of the Dead are conveyed with surreal figures orbiting a darkly cross-hatched cosmos around a brilliant orb that could appear to be a portal to their next incarnation.

By contrast, in The Seven Deadly Sins series, various beings recall Odilon Redon's desire to create figures that, according to the laws of possibility, are impossible. Klabunde's work covers topics based around Greed and Anger as symbols traits.

In 1982 Klabunde began making etchings for Beckett's The Lost Ones, the story of an other-worldly tribe trapped inside a cylinder. Working with Charles Altschul, publisher of New Overbrook Press, the artist's book contains seven hand-pulled intaglio prints placed loosely inside a handmade folio box with unbound pages of text.

Klabunde's drawings imagine the characters as bulbous, Bosch-like concretions, twisted into contortionist poses, and labeled with such titles as The Lull, The Spectacle and The Last State.

The New Overbrook Press edition of The Lost Ones was published on April 13, 1984, Beckett's 78th birthday. The next year Klabunde traveled to Paris and spent time with Beckett, who upon the book's publication, had sent his warm congratulations to the publisher and the artist for those terrifying images. Beckett signed all 250 copies of this limited edition book.

This series, especially, exemplifies the Existential Realist phase of the artist's work.

=== Influences ===
Klabunde's imagery and iconography, although highly individualistic, is often traced from the work of Bosch, Dürer, Breughel, Callot, Rembrandt, Blake, Goya, Meryon, Redon, Klinger, Ensor, Magritte, Klee and Picasso.

== Museum and individual holdings ==
- James A. Michener Art Museum
- University of Delaware
- Metropolitan Museum of Art, New York
- Museum of Modern Art, New York
- National Gallery of Art, Washington, D.C.
- Bibliothèque Nationale, Paris
- Philadelphia Museum of Art, Philadelphia
- Museo Municipal de Arts Graficas, Mara Caibo
- J.P. Morgan Library, New York
- New York Public Library, New York
- Library of Congress, Washington, D.C.
- Art Institute of Chicago, Chicago
- Brooklyn Museum of Art, New York
- Minneapolis Institute of Art, Minneapolis
- Minnesota Museum of Art, Minneapolis
- Sheldon Memorial Art Gallery
- Indianapolis Museum of Art, Indianapolis
- Memorial Art Gallery, Rochester, NY
- Kemper Art Collection, Chicago
- Arkansas Art Center
- Harvard University Library
- Columbia University Library, New York
- Newberry Library, Chicago
- New Orleans Fine Arts Museum
- Museum of Modern Art, San Francisco
- N.J. State Council on Arts Acquisition Award, 1987
- N.J. Governor's Official Residence (Drumthwachet)
- National Gallery of Ireland

== Major exhibitions and shows ==
- Minneapolis Institute of Art, 1963 - Solo Exhibition
- Whitney Museum of American Art, 1970 - Five New York Printmakers
- Sheldon Memorial Gallery, University of Nebraska–Lincoln, 1972 & 1980 - Retrospective
- New York University, 1970 - Solo Exhibition
- Philadelphia Art Alliance, 1973 - Solo Exhibition
- Cedar Rapids Museum of Art, Iowa, 1973 & 1980 - Retrospective
- The Print Club, Philadelphia, 1980 - Retrospective
- American Associated Artists, 1970 & 1980 - Retrospective
- St. MaryÍs College, Maryland, 1975 - Solo Exhibition
- University of Maine, 1975 - Solo Exhibition
- Franz Bader Gallery, Washington, D.C., 1976, 1979 & 1983 - Retrospective
- Van Stratten Gallery, Chicago, 1976 & 1979 - Retrospective
- Borgia Palace, Rome, 1976 - Vatican Exhibition
- Channel 13, New York, 1979 - Artist Presentation
- New Orleans Academy of Fine Arts, 1985 - Retrospective
- Antiquarian Society, London, England - Solo Exhibition
- Galerie Lucie Weill, Paris - Solo Exhibition
- University of Maine - Solo Exhibition
- Clinton Art Center - Solo Exhibition
- Stover Mill, Erwinna, PA - Solo Exhibition
- San Jose, Costa Rica (Exhibition and Promotion of La Marta Project, 1996)

== Publications, awards and lectures ==
- "Liberal Content" 1962
- "Iowan" 1963
- "laRevue Modernes des Arts de la Vie," Paris 1964
- New Jersey Council of Arts, 1988, Purchase Award
- Davidson College, 1973, Purchase Award
- The Print Club, 1975, Purchase Award
- La Tertulia Museum, Cali, Colombia, South America, 1976, Purchase Award
- National Academy of Design, 1979, Purchase Award
- Brooklyn Museum of Art School Lecture
- Webster College, St. Louis Lecture
- Gilford College, Greensboro, N.C. Lecture
- American Associated Artists, International Collection, 1971, 1973, 1975 and 1978
- Collaboration with Samuel Beckett (7 Engraved Images for The Lost Ones, 1984)
- ULACIT, San Jose, Costa Rica (La Marta Project, 1996)
- La Marta Documentary Video (1997)
- Emory University, Atlanta, Lecture Word & Image: Samuel Beckett & the Visual Text (1999)
- National Gallery of Ireland (2006) Beckett Centenary Festival: Beckett & The Visual Arts, Dublin, Ireland
