= Hamburg Messe und Congress =

Hamburg Messe und Congress GmbH
- Industry: Commercial Fairs
- Headquarters: Hamburg, Germany, Hamburg, Germany
- Key people: executive management: Bernd Aufderheide, President and CEO
- Revenue: EUR 72.8 million (2017)
- Owner: HGV Hamburger Gesellschaft für Vermögens- und Beteiligungsmanagement mbH
- Number of employees: 254 employees (full-time/FTEs 2017)
- Website: hamburg-messe.com

Hamburg Messe und Congress GmbH (acronym: HMC) is a legal entity owned by the city of Hamburg (full German name: Freie und Hansestadt Hamburg). The Hamburg exhibition complex is host to more than 40 events managed by HMC or third-party organizers annually, drawing over 15,000 exhibitors and 700,000 visitors. In addition, the CCH (Congress Center Hamburg) has hosted approximately 250 conferences, conventions, annual meetings and other events per annum until the end of 2016, attracting an additional 300,000 national and international attendees. The owners of the CCH, CCH Immobilien GmbH & Co. KG, launched a comprehensive remodeling and modernization campaign of the convention center in January, 2017.

A prominent business unit of HMC is Hamburg Messe.

== Portfolio ==
The current portfolio of events held on Messehallen Hamburg convention center focuses on industries that are well established in the city of Hamburg. Such as the international maritime trade fair SMM, the food service trade show INTERNORGA, and the expo for wind energy WindEnergy Hamburg. Other trade shows open to the general public include the tourism fair REISEN HAMBURG and the equestrian expo HansePferd Hamburg, along with special events. In 2017 two new events organized by HMC were added, home² is a trade show catering to home builders, and the Hamburg Motor Classics expo for antique and vintage cars.

There are also guest events geared towards specific industries, such as the aviation or renewable energy sectors. Hamburg Messe und Congress is also active internationally, hosting its own trade shows abroad as well as organizing German joint booths at major international industry events.
