= Congress Center Hamburg =

Convention center in Hamburg, Germany

Coordinates: 53°33′41.7″N 9°59′8.46″E

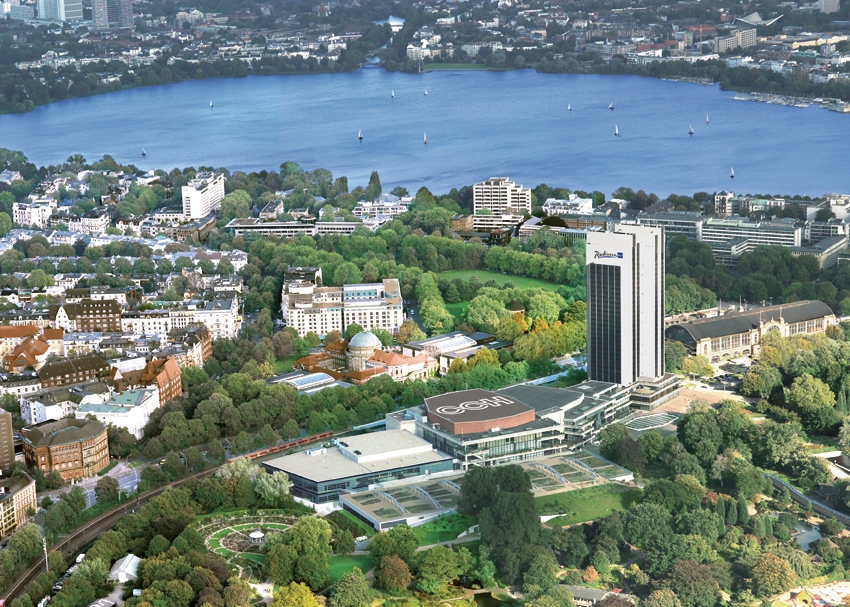
- Aerial view of convention center (c.2007)
- Interactive map of Congress Center Hamburg
- Former names: Congress Centrum Hamburg (1973-2004)
- Address: Marseiller St; 20355 Hamburg, Germany
- Location: St. Pauli
- Owner: Hamburg Messe und Congress

Construction
- Groundbreaking: 5 March 1970
- Opened: 14 April 1973
- Renovated: 2017-20
- Cost: DM 100 million (€176 million in 2019)

Website
- cch.de

Congress Center Hamburg (CCH; formerly Congress Centrum Hamburg) is a convention center in Hamburg, Germany, located right next to Planten un Blomen, near the Hamburg Dammtor station. It opened on 14 April 1973 as the first of its kind in Germany. Since then, it has undergone multiple expansions and renovations, including a complete overhaul in 2017. In addition to conventions, it also hosts concerts, and has attracted artists such as Queen and ABBA. It has an attached hotel, the Radisson Blu Hotel Hamburg.

== History ==
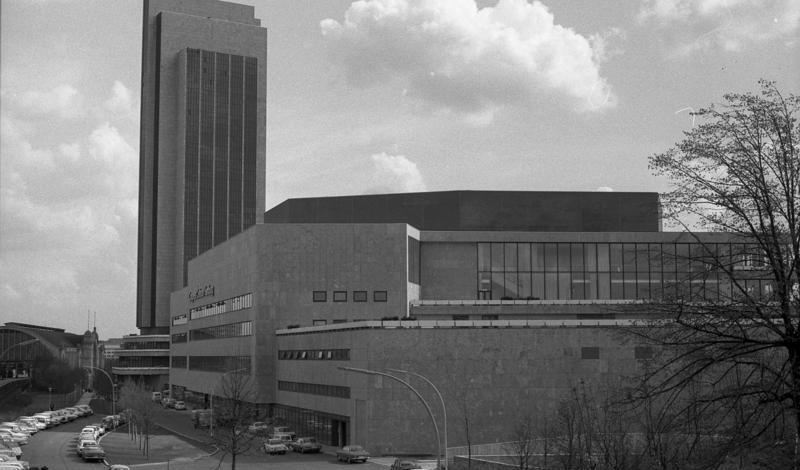
Congress Center Hamburg in 1973.

The CCH was the first convention center in Germany. The government of Hamburg, including then-mayor Herbert Weichmann planned the center to promote tourism, being designed to attract the then-new demographic of convention-goers. It was initially planned to be built in the Karolinenviertel neighbourhood, but this was rejected as it would lead to the destruction of extant buildings; instead, it was built in Planten un Blomen. The opening ceremony took place on 14 April 1973 with 3000 attendees, but the operators of the speaker system were absent, leading to "two hours of noise". The original design was criticised as a "bunker", but its relative lack of windows was liked by military representatives during the Cold War as they were afraid of spies.

After the building was opened, it was expanded multiple times to increase its capacity. Initially, this was controversial as the space intruded on the adjacent park. In 2000, the foyer and restaurant annex was overhauled, and in 2006, Hall H was opened, adding a roof garden to the complex.

A contest to overhaul the CCH was undertaken in 2014, which was won by Tim Hupe Architects; it was initially projected to cost 194 million euros. In 2017, it was discovered that the center was contaminated with polychlorinated biphenyls and asbestos, necessitating further work. The renovation involved adding capacity to the building and overhauling much of the rooms. Although many parts were completely renovated, the heritage-listed brick walls of the main theater and aluminium "jug lights" were retained. The old foyer was replaced with a new multi-storey one with large glass windows that contains the largest pendant light in the world. A passage was added parallel to the halls to allow different users to occupy them concurrently. The renovated center opened in 2022, at an increased cost of 297 million euros, caused by the asbestos contamination and COVID-19 pandemic.

== Events ==
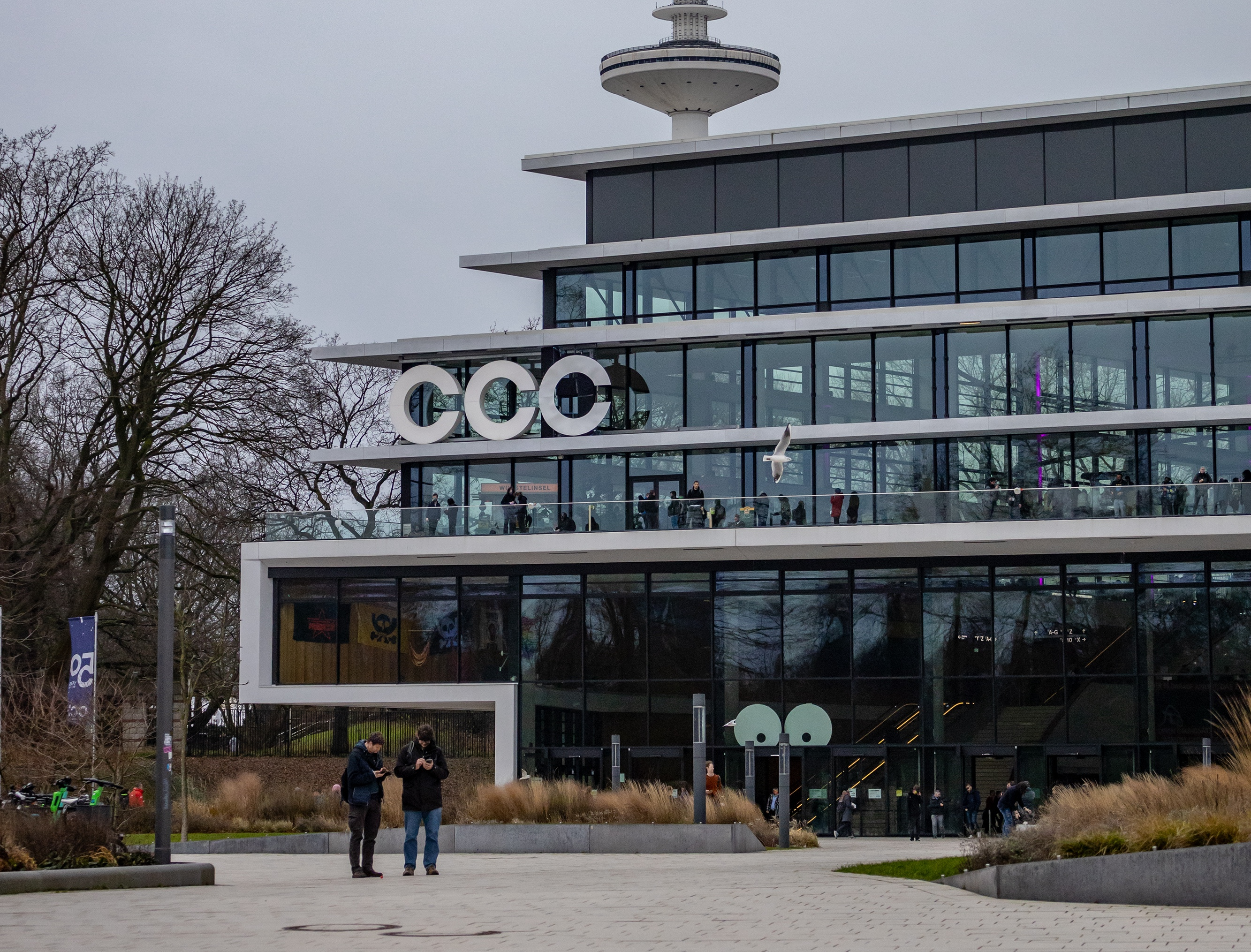
The CCH post-renovation, with the sign changed to CCC for the Chaos Communication Congress.

The CCH has hosted multiple back-to-back years of the Chaos Communication Congress and Eurofurence. It has also been home to many political party conferences, including speeches by Helmut Kohl, Angela Merkel, Willy Brandt, and Helmut Schmidt.

In addition to trade congresses and conventions, it has also hosted concerts by Queen, ABBA, Hans Zimmer, and Deep Purple. Udo Jürgens had a bathtub installed in one of the cloakrooms, as he did not like showering.

== Location and capacities ==
The CCH is near the Planten un Blomen, the University of Hamburg, and the Hamburg Dammtor station. It is directly connected to the Radisson Blu Hotel Hamburg, which was opened in 1973 and renovated in 2009.

The building has a total capacity of 105,000 square metres (126,000 yd^{2}), has over 50 rooms, and accommodates up to 12,000 people. The perennial roof garden on the top of Hall H is the largest in Europe.

Venue configurations/capacities
Venue	Capacity
Hall 1	2,680
Hall 3	1,910
Hall 4	672
Hall G	1,058
Hall X	1,338
Hall Y	1,338
Hall Z	820
Hall H	6,930

The center is operated by Hamburg Messe und Congress, which also operates the Hamburg Messe.

== See also ==
- Hamburg Messe
