= Hamburg Messe =

Trade fairground in Hamburg, Germany

- Industry: Trade fairs
- Headquarters: Hamburg, Germany
- Key people: Bernd Aufderheide (President and CEO), Uwe Fischer (CFO); State Secretary Dr. Torsten Sevecke (Chairman of Supervisory Board)
- Owner: City of Hamburg (HGV)
- Number of employees: 254 (full-time/FTEs 2017)
- Parent: Hamburg Messe und Congress GmbH
- Website: hamburg-messe.de

Hamburg Messe is a business unit of Hamburg Messe und Congress GmbH.

The area of Hamburg Messe hosts about 40 trade fairs annually, with over 15000 exhibitors and 700000 visitors.

About 15 events are operated by Hamburg Messe itself.

== Exhibition grounds ==
The convention center consists of eleven halls with a total space of 87000 m^{2} and another 10000 m^{2} outside of the halls.

=== "Neue Messe Hamburg" ===
The current site is the result of a large expansion undertaken from 2004 to 2008 according to the plans of architect Christoph Ingenhoven. Originally the fair ground was bound to the area between St. Petersburger Straße, Karolinenstraße und Holstenglacis / Bei den Kirchhöfen and consisted of the halls 1 to 12. It was then extended west across Karolinenstraße with another four halls (A1 to A4). The original halls 9 to 12 became B1 to B4 and halls 1 to 8 were replaced with the new halls B5 to B7.

The original hall 8 was 24 meters in height and had complete glass walls, making this hall particularly useful for large exhibits like full hot air balloons. It was also used for some concerts.

== Events and exhibitions ==
The well known and regular events hosted on the premises of the Hamburg Messe include among others:

- OMR Festival – digital marketing and technology conference
- Aircraft Interiors Expo – International convention for aircraft interiors (operated by Reed Exhibitions in co-operation with Hamburg Messe und Congress)
- Internorga – International trade show for foodservice and hospitality
- SMM – Series of international maritime trade fairs and conferences
- Reisen Hamburg – Expo for travel, caravaning, outdoor and biking
- WindEnergy Hamburg – On- and offshore wind energy expo (in co-operation with Messe Husum & Congress)
- Seatrade Europe – Cruise and Rivercruise Convention
