= Planten un Blomen =

Park in Hamburg, Germany

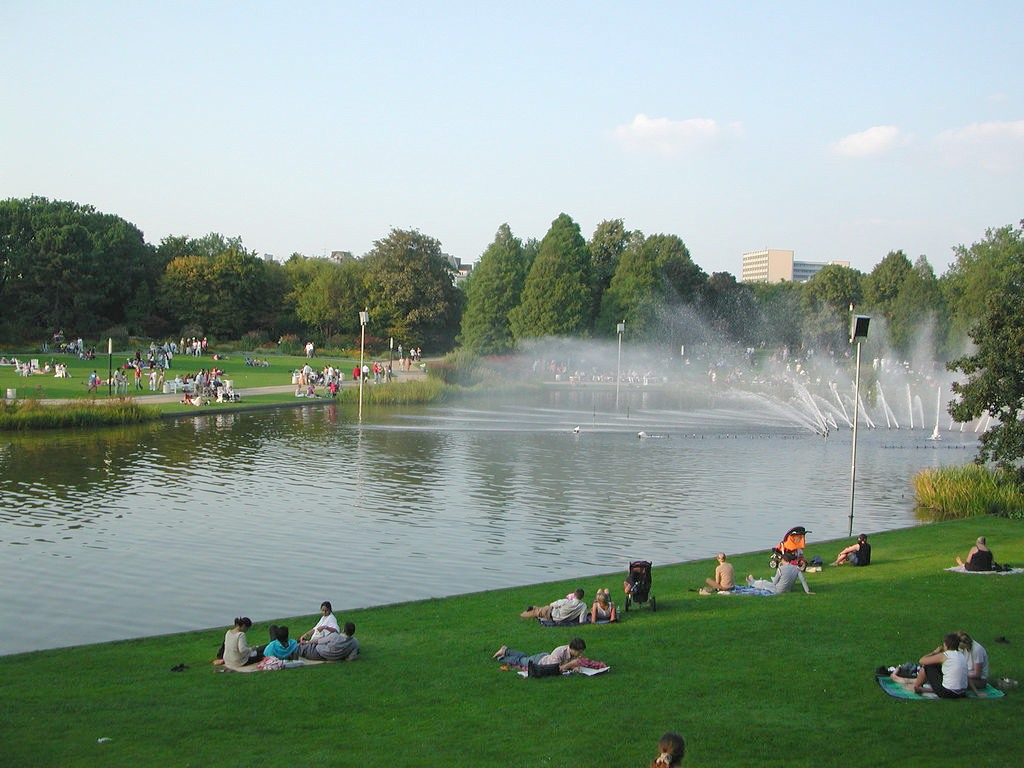
- A lawn in Planten un Blomen on a Sunday
- Interactive map of Planten un Blomen
- Type: Public park
- Location: St. Petersburger Straße 28; 20095 Hamburg, Germany
- Coordinates: 53°33′40″N 9°59′00″E
- Area: 47 ha (0.47 km^{2})
- Opened: 1930
- Manager: Hamburg-Mitte District Office
- Open: All year
- Public transit: Hamburg Dammtor
- Website: www.hamburg.de

Planten un Blomen (German pronunciation: [ˈplantn̩ ʊn ˈbloːmn̩]) is an urban park with a size of 47 hectares (116.1 acres) in the inner-city of Hamburg, Germany. The name Planten un Blomen is Low German for "Plants and Flowers".

== History ==
After the destruction of Hamburg's old city fortifications in the early 1800s, a green belt was established in their place; part of this makes up the modern Planten un Blomen. The first plant was a Platanus, planted by Johann Georg Christian Lehmann in November 1821. It can be seen next to the Hamburg Dammtor station entrance of the park.

The area was previously home to a zoo and a cemetery, the latter of which had to be dismantled for its construction. The modern park was established in 1933; in accordance with Nazi ideology, only German plants were included at the time. In 1953 and 1973 the Internationale Gartenbauausstellung (International Horticulture Show, IGA) were held at the park.

== Overview ==
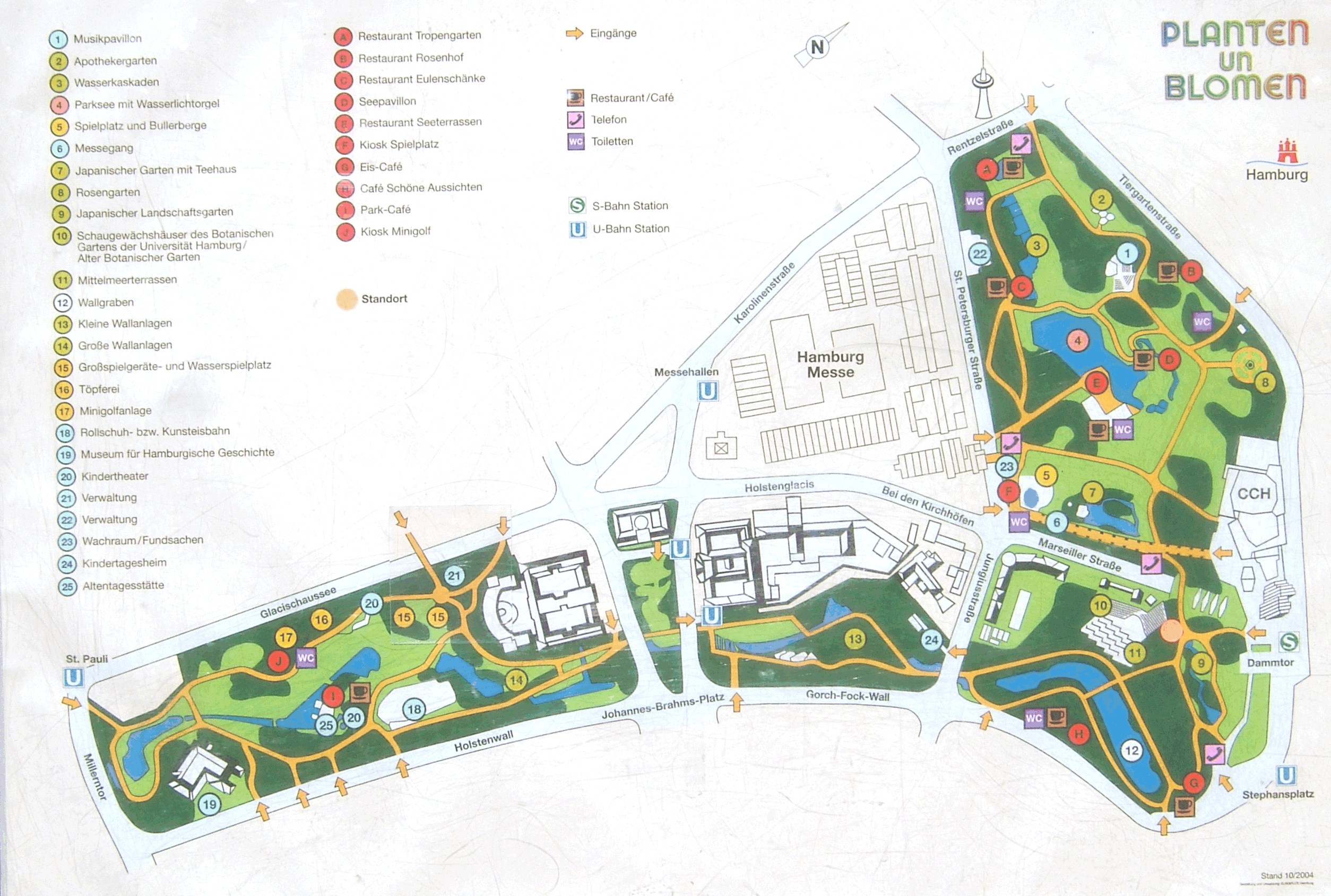
General map (October 2004)

The park has water-light concerts, public theater and music performances. In addition to the main gardens, there is a large playground and a Japanese garden. The park is open all year round and there is no entrance fee.

It contains the Old Botanical Garden of Hamburg.

== Gallery ==
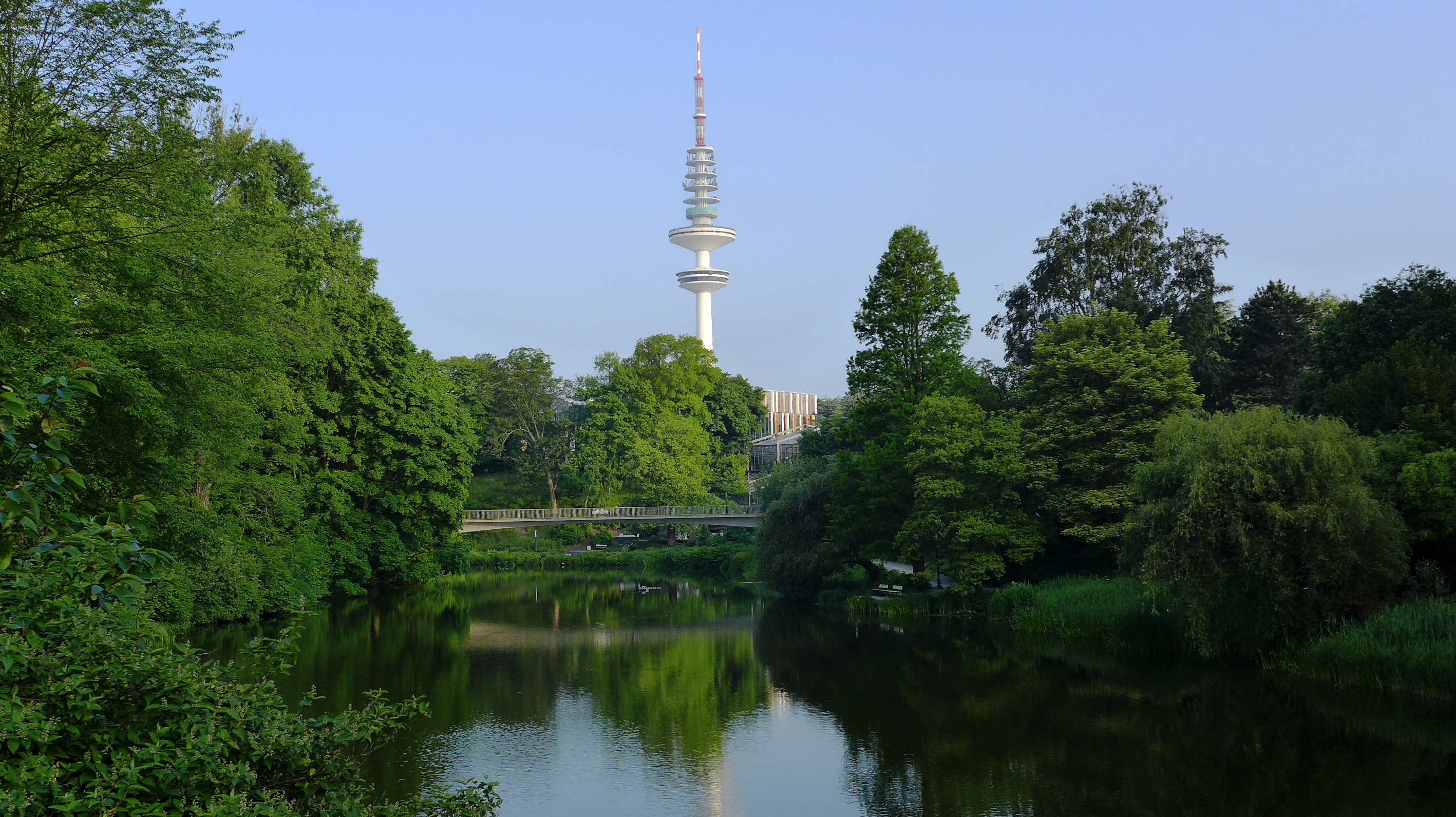
Park and Heinrich-Hertz-Turm

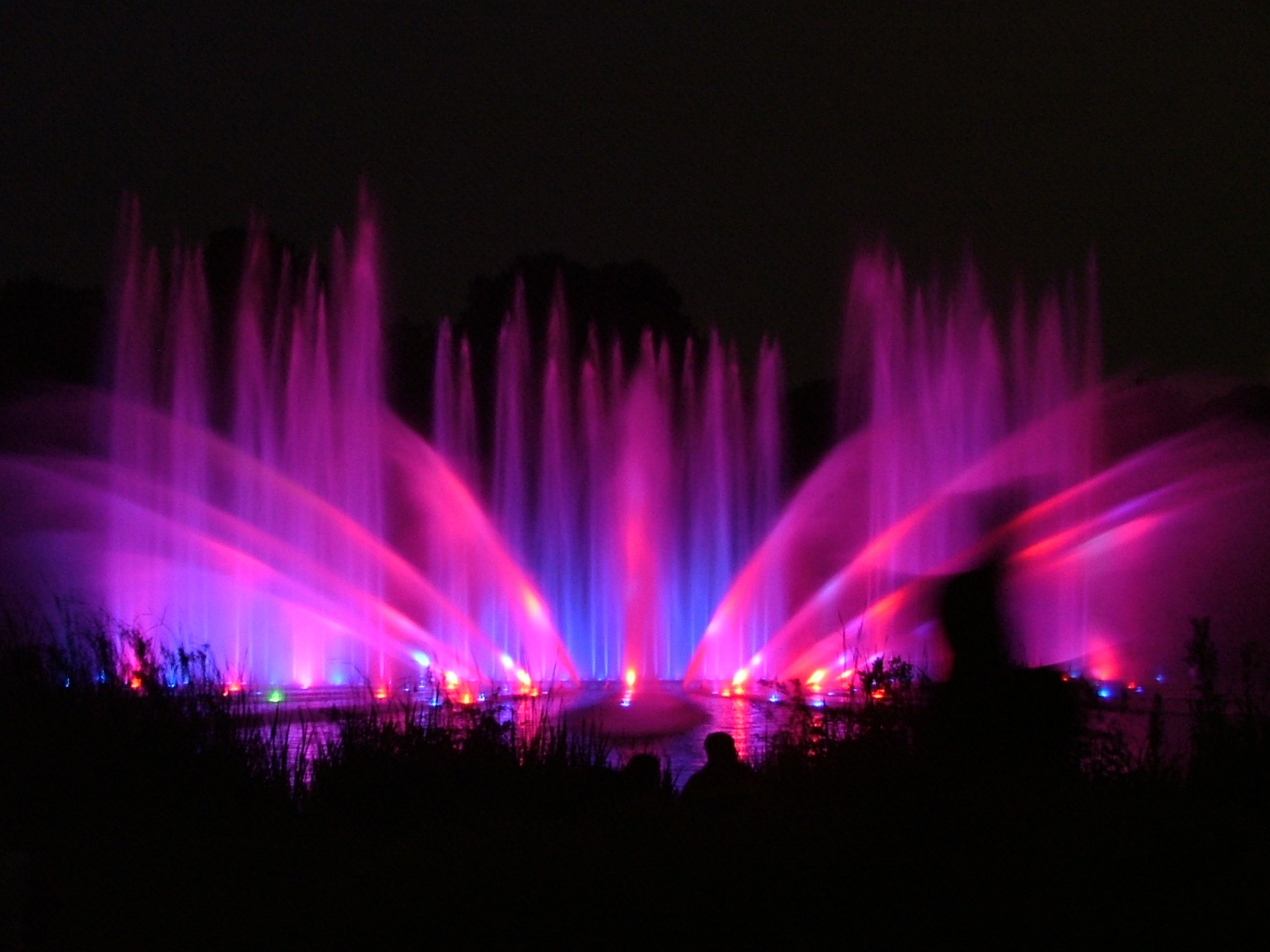
Water-light concert at Planten un Blomen

== See also ==
- Congress Center Hamburg (CCH)
- Dammtor
