= Baumwall station =

Railway station in Hamburg-Neustadt, Germany

Baumwall
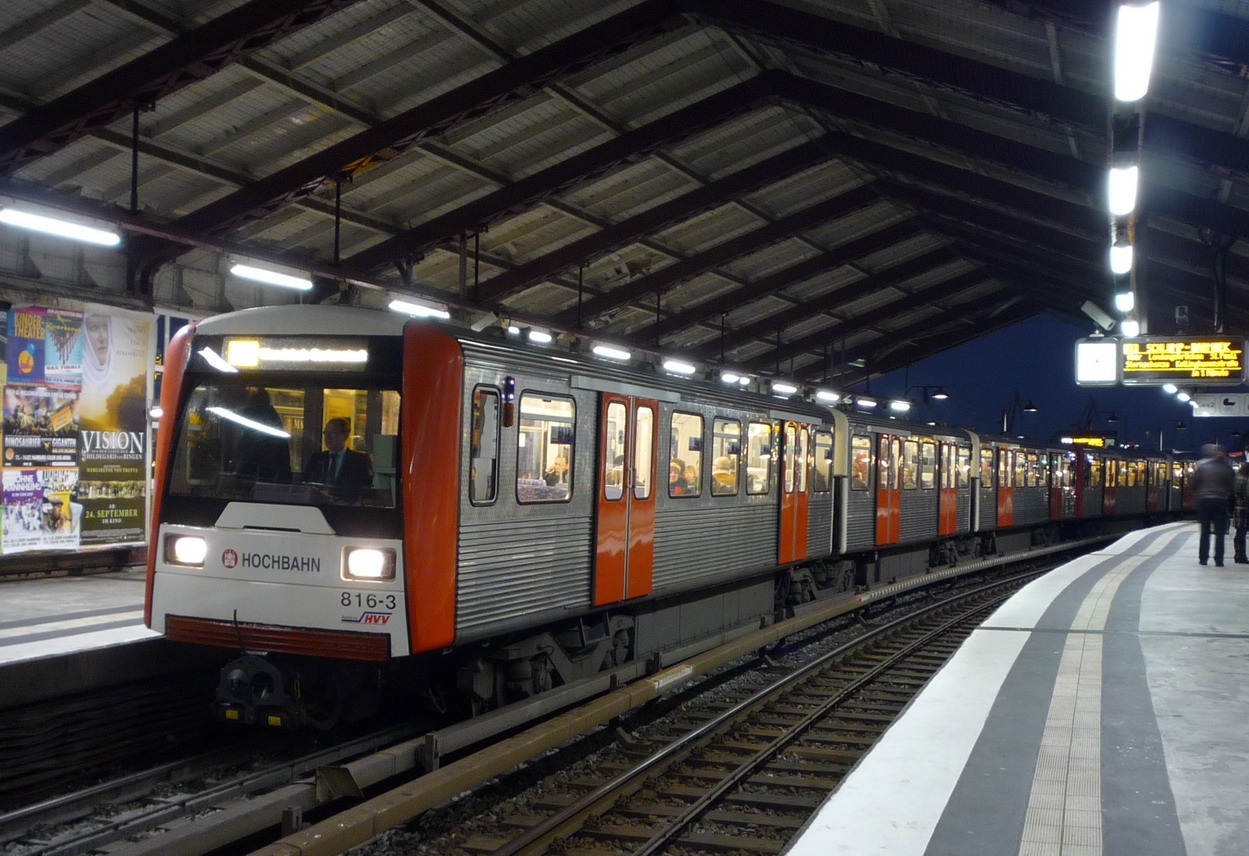

General information
- Location: Baumwall; Neustadt, Hamburg; Germany
- Coordinates: 53°32′39″N 09°58′53″E
- System: Hamburg U-Bahn station
- Operator: Hamburger Hochbahn AG
- Line: U3
- Platforms: 2 side platforms
- Tracks: 2
- Connections: Bus, Taxi

Construction
- Structure type: Elevated
- Accessible: Yes

Other information
- Fare zone: HVV: A/000 and 108

History
- Opened: 1912

Services
Preceding station	Hamburg U-Bahn	Following station
Landungsbrücken towards Barmbek	U3	Rödingsmarkt towards Wandsbek-Gartenstadt
Location
- Location within Hamburg Location within Schleswig-Holstein Location within Germany Location within Europe

Baumwall (German pronunciation: [ˈbaʊ̯mˌval]) is an elevated metro station located at Baumwall embankment in Hamburg's inner-city. It was opened in 1912 and is served by Hamburg U-Bahn line U3. It was renamed Baumwall (Elbphilharmonie) on 2 December 2016.

== Location ==
Baumwall ("tree ridge") is the name of an embankment on the Hamburg Harbour front. The station is located at the exposed headland of Fleet Island, between Herrengrabenfleet, Alsterfleet and Binnenhafen. Administratively, Baumwall belongs to Neustadt; bridges across Alsterfleet and Binnenhafen connect it with the districts Altstadt and HafenCity respectively. Historically, Baumwall was site of a water barrier and part of the Hamburg Wallanlagen.

The station has significance for both commuters and visitors. It is nearest station for the Hanseatic Trade Center and other large office complexes like Gruner + Jahr. For visitors it offers access to the Elbe Philharmonic Hall and the Speicherstadt.

== Service ==
Baumwall is served by Hamburg U-Bahn line U3.

== Gallery ==
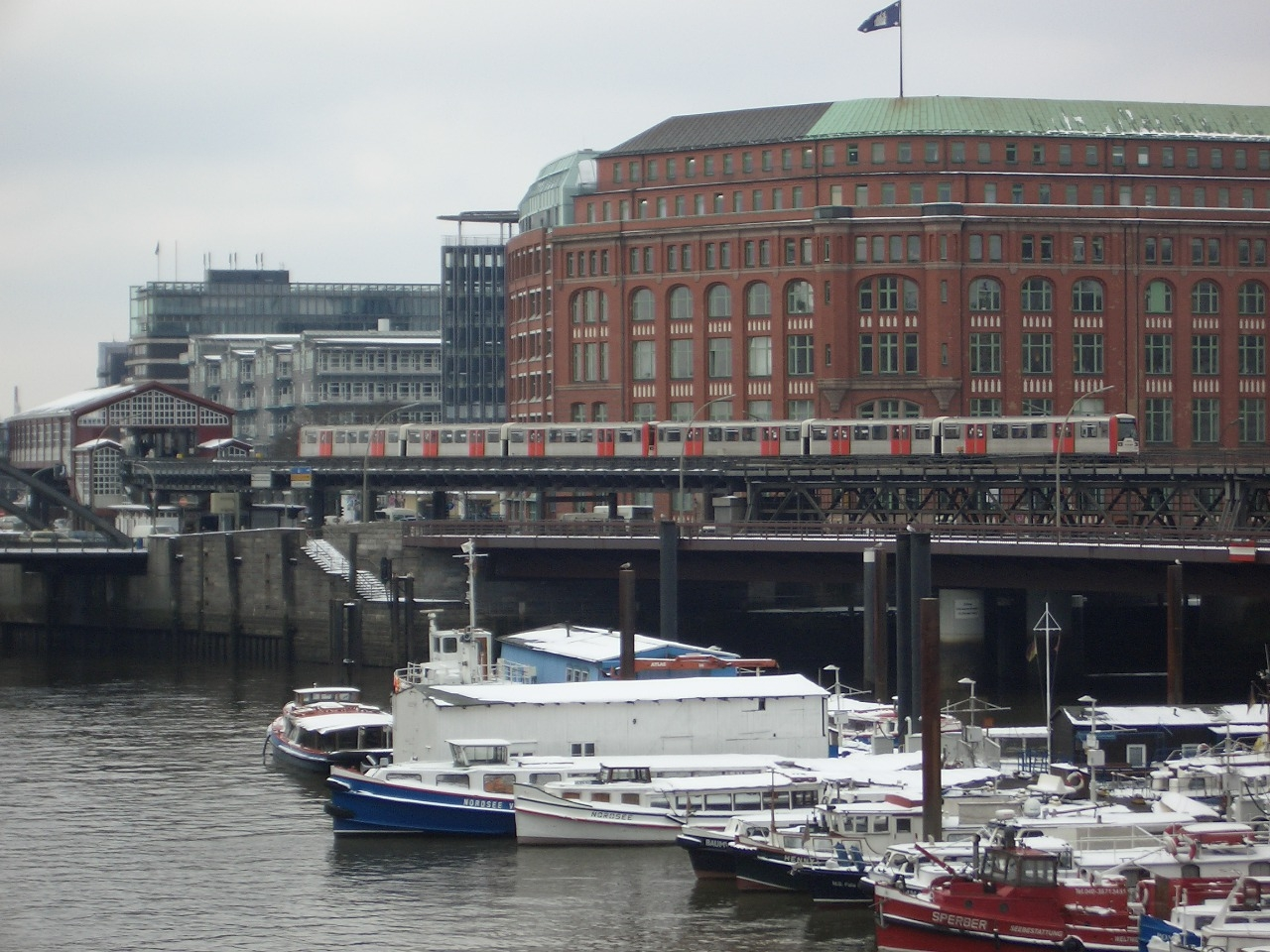
View across Binnenhafen: Baumwall station (far left) and the Hochbahn viaduct across Alsterfleet

== See also ==
- List of Hamburg U-Bahn stations
