= List of tallest buildings in Hamburg =

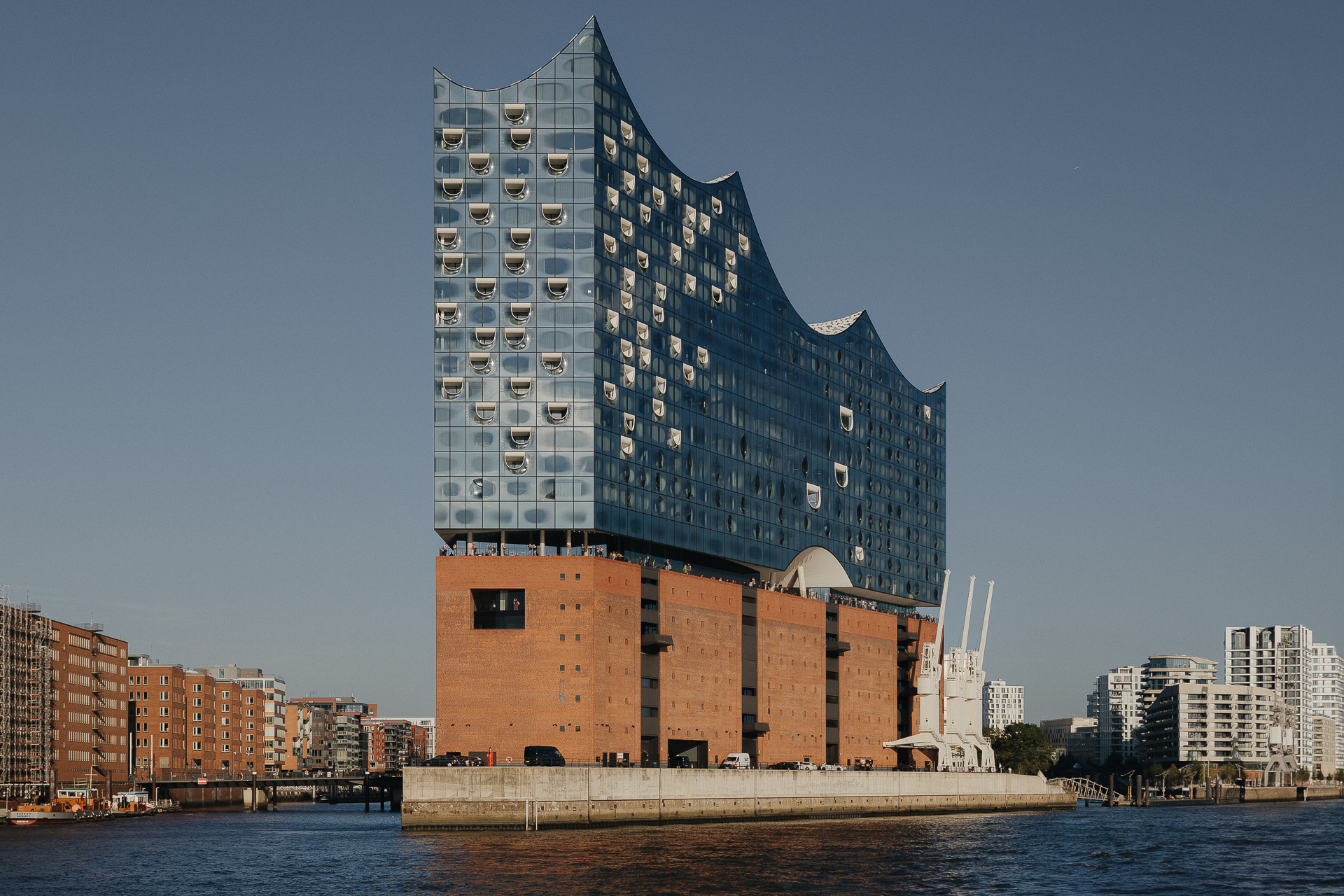
HafenCity: The Elbphilharmonie (also English: Elbe Philharmonic Hall), one of the largest and most acoustically advanced concert halls in the world

This list of tallest buildings in Hamburg ranks high-rise buildings and some important landmarks that reach a height of 50 meters (164 feet). The tallest freestanding structure in the city is the 279-meter-high Heinrich-Hertz-Turm, a television tower built in 1968.

Hamburg's city centre is dominated by church towers; Hamburg is the city with the most churches taller than 100 meters. High-rise buildings, on the other hand, are found in smaller clusters in the HafenCity, at Berliner Tor in St. Georg, in the Hafenkrone in St. Pauli and in Mundsburg in Hamburg-Nord.

The criterion for skyscrapers is usually a height of 150 meters or more. So far, no Hamburg building has reached this mark, but Hamburg has made a first attempt in this direction with the Elbtower. However, construction was halted at the end of October 2023 as the developer failed to make payments to the construction company.

== Gallery ==
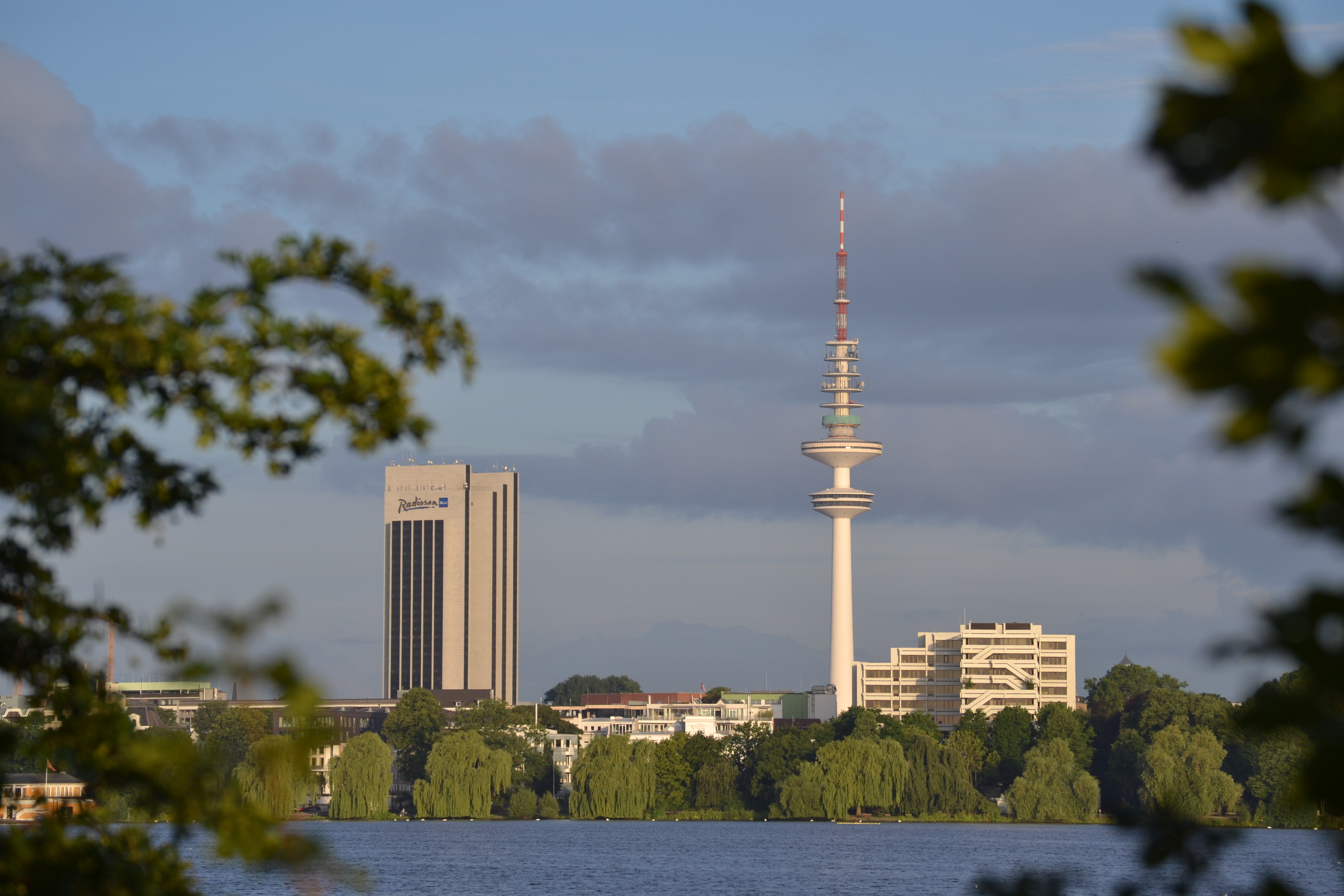
Radisson Blu Hotel Hamburg & Heinrich Hertz Tower

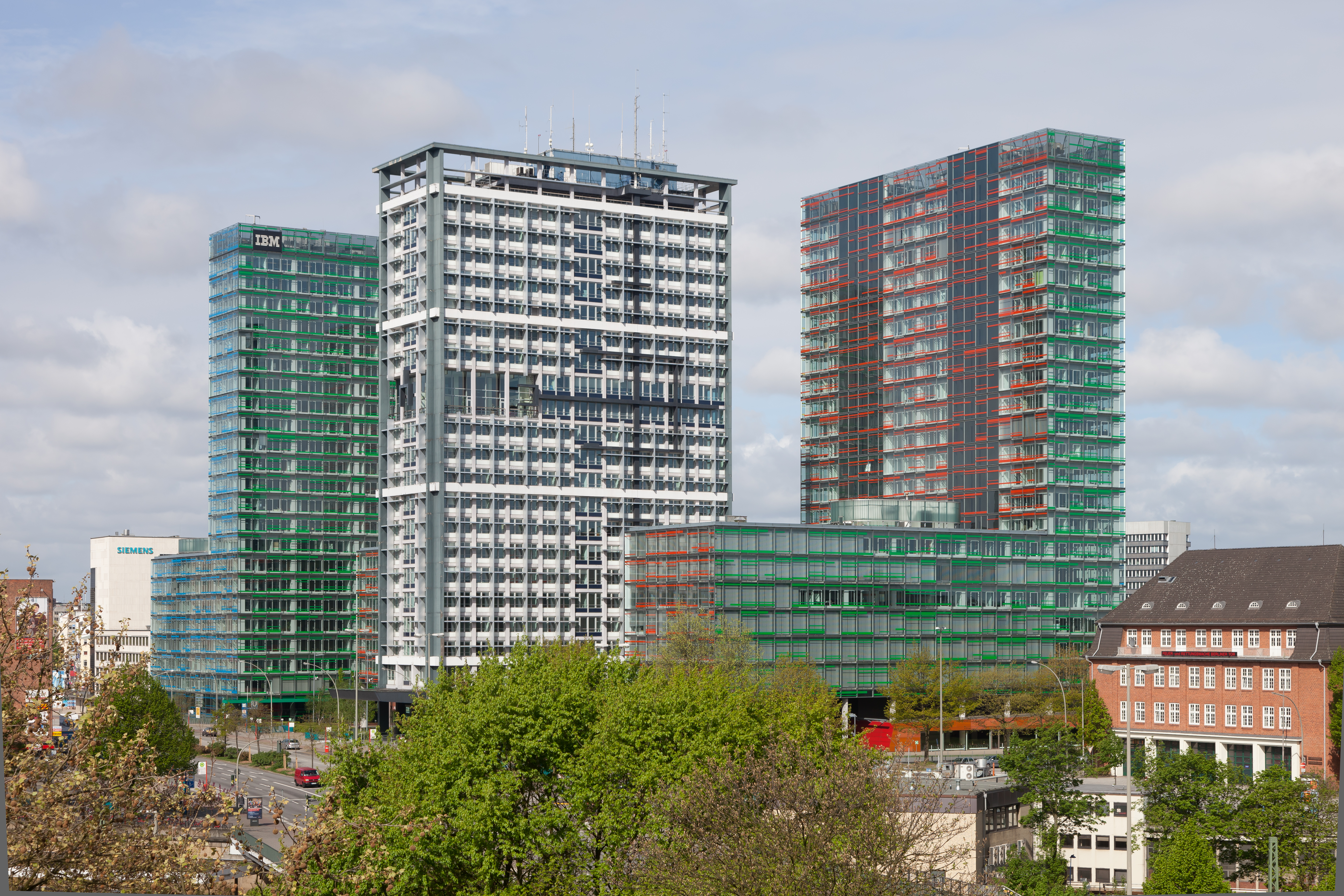
Berliner Tor Center, St. Georg

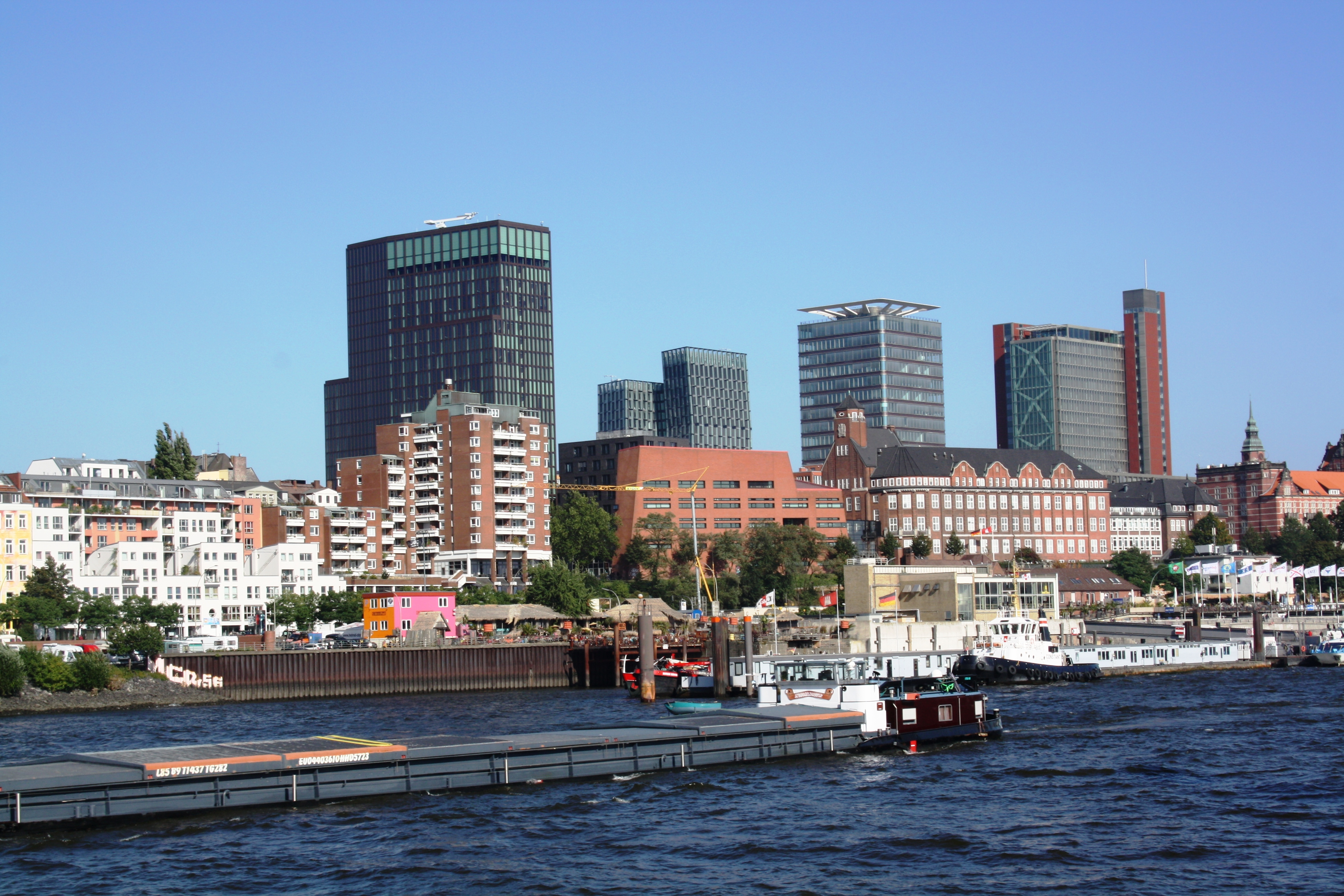
Hafenkrone, St. Pauli

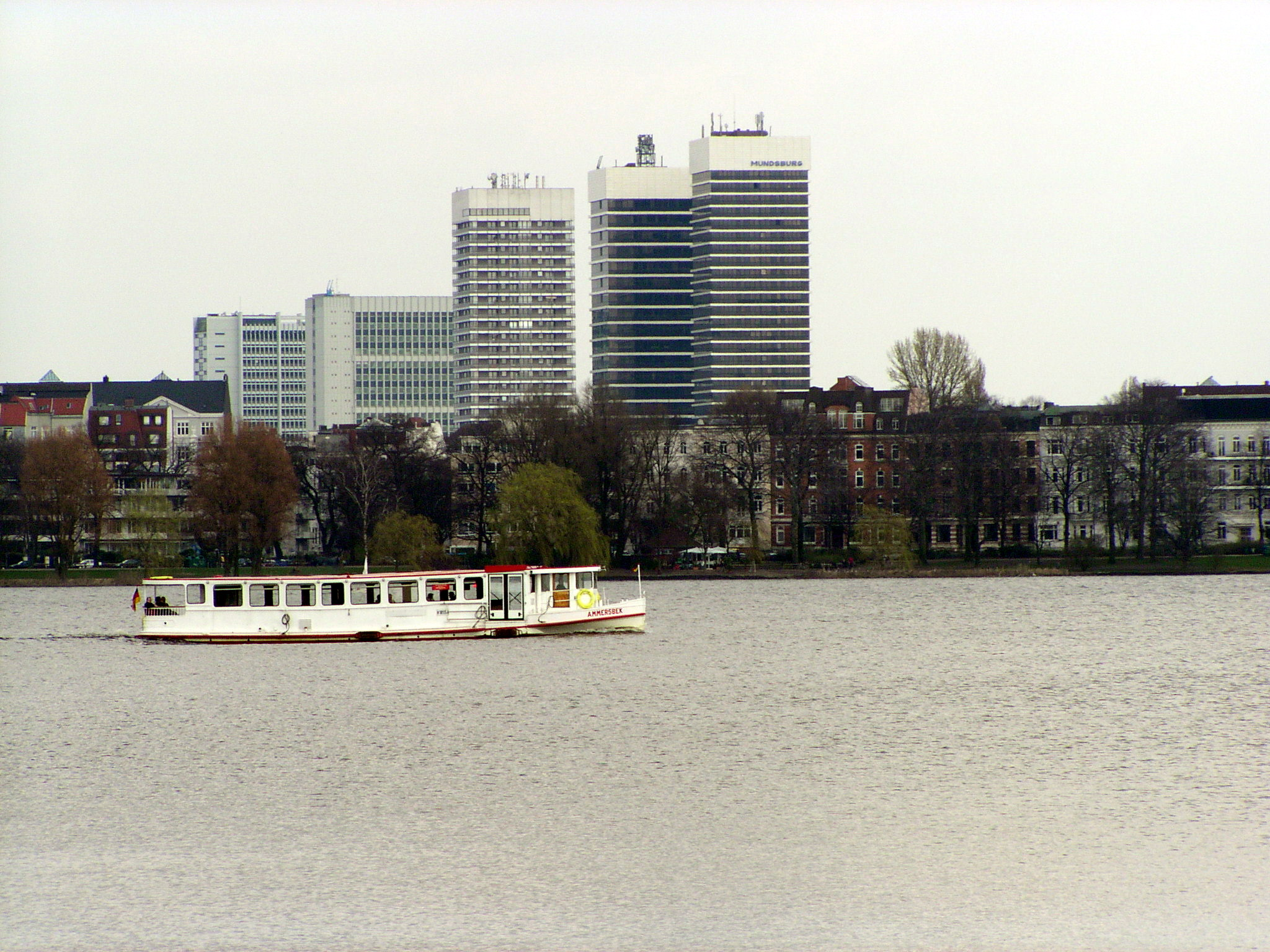
Mundsburg Towers and Alster

Rank	Name	Image	Height m (ft)	Floors	Year completed	Use / Note
	Heinrich-Hertz-Turm		279.2 m (916 ft)		1968	Telecommunications tower, Tallest freestanding structure in Hamburg.
	St. Nikolai		147.3 m (483 ft)		1874	Tallest church tower in Hamburg. Ruin since 1943
	Köhlbrand Bridge		135 m (443 ft)		1974	Cable-stayed bridge
	St. Petri		133 m (436 ft)		1878	
	St. Michaelis		132 m (433 ft)		1762	
	St. Jacobi		125 m (410 ft)		1589 (Reconstructed in 1963)	Destroyed by bombing during World War II. Reconstructed with modern spire.
	St. Katharinen		116.7 m (383 ft)		1657 (Reconstructed in 1957)	Destroyed by bombing during World War II. Reconstructed with modern spire.
	Hamburg City Hall		112 m (367 ft)		1897	Second tallest city hall in Germany.
1	Elbphilharmonie		110 m (361 ft)	26	2017	Elbe Philharmonic Hall is a concert hall in the HafenCity quarter of Hamburg.
2	Radisson Blu Hotel Hamburg		108 m (354 ft)	32	1973	Tallest hotel building in Hamburg.
3	Columbus Haus		105 m (344 ft)	23	1997	Office, part of Hanseatic Trade Center
4	Mundsburg Turm I		101 m (331 ft)	29	1973	Residential
5	Emporio (Hamburg)		98 m (322 ft)	24	1964	Office
6	Mundsburg Turm III		97 m (318 ft)	22	1973	Residential
	St. Gertrud		93 m (305 ft)		1886	
7	Mundsburg Turm II		90 m (295 ft)	26	1975	Residential
7	Berliner Tor Center III		90 m (295 ft)	22	2004	Office
7	Berliner Tor Center II		90 m (295 ft)	22	2004	Office
	St. Nikolai		89.4 m (293 ft)		1962	
10	Atlantic-Haus		88 m (289 ft)	21	2007	Office
11	Geomatikum		85 m (279 ft)	20	1975	University building
11	Dancing Towers		85 m (279 ft)	24	2012	Office
13	Berliner Tor Center I		83 m (272 ft)	22	1962	Office, former police headquarters
	St. Johannis		83 m (272 ft)		1873	
	St. Johannis-Harvestehude		79.5 m (261 ft)		1882	
	Friedenskirche		78.3 m (257 ft)		1894	
14	Kaiserhof		78 m (256 ft)	17	1963	Office
15	Wohnhochhaus Palmaille 35		75 m (246 ft)	23	1969	Residential
15	Holiday Inn Hotel Hamburg		75 m (246 ft)	18	1995	Hotel
15	Channel Tower		75 m (246 ft)	18	2003	Office
18	Motel One Hamburg-Alster		73.3 m (240 ft)	20	2010	Hotel
19	Empire Riverside Hotel		73 m (240 ft)	20	2007	Hotel
20	Gorch-Fock-Haus		72 m (236 ft)	23	1972	Residential
20	Kristall		72 m (236 ft)	20	2011	Residential
22	Hamburger Meile (Turm 1)		70 m (230 ft)	18	1970	Office
22	Wohnhochhaus Jessenstraße 4		70 m (230 ft)	16	1975	Residential
22	Astra-Turm		70 m (230 ft)	17	2007	Office
22	Watermark (Intelligent Quarters)		70 m (230 ft)	20	2018	Office
	Christuskirche		70 m (230 ft)		1965	
26	Elbe-Einkaufszentrum Turm I		69 m (226 ft)	19		Residential
26	Berliner Tor 7		69 m (226 ft)	14	1970s	University building
28	Neues Steintor		65 m (213 ft)	17		Office
29	Tower am Michel (Former Hochhaus Deutscher Ring)		63 m (207 ft)	18	1964 (Refurbishment 1999)	Office
29	Hamburger Meile (Turm 2)		63 m (207 ft)	16	1970	Office
31	Kallmorgen Tower		62 m (203 ft)	17	1965	Residential
31	Hotel Hafen Hamburg		62 m (203 ft)	15	1987	Hotel
31	Achtern Born 84		62 m (203 ft)	21	1972	Residential
34	Spiegel-Gebäude		61 m (200 ft)	13	2011	Headquarters of Spiegel Gruppe
35	Mövenpick Hotel		60 m (197 ft)	19	1910 (Refurbishment 2007)	Hotel
35	Asklepios Klinik Altona		60 m (197 ft)	20	1970	Hospital
35	Grünes Zentrum I		60 m (197 ft)	16	1971	Residential
35	Grünes Zentrum II		60 m (197 ft)	16	1971	Residential
35	Grünes Zentrum III		60 m (197 ft)	16	1971	Residential
35	Fruchtallee 83		60 m (197 ft)	19		Residential
35	Philips-Deutschland-Zentrale		60 m (197 ft)	17	2005	Office, former Seat of Philips
35	Holiday Inn Hamburg City Nord		60 m (197 ft)	18	2016	Hotel
35	Konrad Wohnen		60 m (197 ft)	17	2019	Residential
35	Kap 5		60 m (197 ft)	16	2023	Office
35	Ipanema Hamburg		60 m (197 ft)	13	2024	Office
46	Arabica-Tower Hamburg		59 m (194 ft)	14	2010	Residential
46	The Crown		58 m (190 ft)	14	2025	Office, Residential
46	Fifty9 Strandkai		59 m (194 ft)	17	2024	Office, Residential
49	Flakturm IV (Hochbunker St. Pauli)		58 m (190 ft)	12	1940 (2019)	Former flak tower, additional floors added
49	AlsterCity Hamburg		58 m (190 ft)	16	1990	Office
49	Suitehotel Hamburg City		58 m (190 ft)	18	2002	Hotel
49	Studentenapartments Berliner Tor		58 m (190 ft)	18	2002	Residential
49	Marco-Polo-Tower		58 m (190 ft)	16	2010	Residential
49	Verwaltungsgebäude Hamburg Süd		58 m (190 ft)	14	1964 (refurbishment 2016)	Office
55	Niebuhr-Hochhaus		57 m (187 ft)	17	1971	
55	Hanseatic Trade Center, Phase III		57 m (187 ft)	16	1996	Office
55	Cinnamon Tower		57 m (187 ft)	15	2014	Residential
55	Engel & Völkers Firmenzentrale		57 m (187 ft)	15	2019	
59	VBG-Tower		56 m (184 ft)	15	2016	
60	Brahms-Kontor		55 m (180 ft)	15	1931	Office
60	Hochhaus Howaldtswerke-Deutsche Werft AG		55 m (180 ft)	14	1958	
60	Achter Born 86		55 m (180 ft)	19	1972	Residential
60	Überseering 35		55 m (180 ft)	13	1973	Office
60	Silo Harburg		55 m (180 ft)	15	2003	Office
60	Campus Tower		55 m (180 ft)	16	2019	Office
66	Sibeliusstraße 1		54 m (177 ft)	16	2019	Residential
66	Sibeliusstraße 2		54 m (177 ft)	16		Residential
66	Sibeliusstraße 4		54 m (177 ft)	16		Residential
66	Sibeliusstraße 5		54 m (177 ft)	16		Residential
66	SAGA-Hochhaus		54 m (177 ft)	16		Residential
66	Coffee Plaza		54 m (177 ft)	12	2010	Office
72	Kontorhaus am Großmarkt		53 m (174 ft)	14	1965	Office
73	Philosophenturm der Universität Hamburg		52 m (171 ft)	14	1963	University building
73	Billstraße 84		52 m (171 ft)	14	1965	Office
73	HAW Hamburg		52 m (171 ft)	15	2002	University building
76	Finnlandhaus		51 m (167 ft)	14	1966	Office
77	Meßberghof		50 m (164 ft)	10	1924	Office
77	Springer-Hochhaus		50 m (164 ft)	14	1956	Seat of Axel Springer Verlag
77	Alster-Tower		50 m (164 ft)	15	1958	Office
77	Burmah-Haus		50 m (164 ft)	13	1960	Office
77	Falkenried Tower		50 m (164 ft)	14	2004	Residential
77	Behörde für Stadtentwicklung und Wohnen		50 m (164 ft)	12	2012	Office
77	IntercityHotel Hamburg Dammtor-Messe		50 m (164 ft)	14	2014	Hotel
77	Esplanade 40		50 m (164 ft)	14	2017	Office

== Under construction ==
Name	Height (m)	Height (ft)	Floors	Year
Elbtower	199	653	52	On Hold
Skysegel	73	239.5	16	2025
Präventionszentrum der Berufsgenossenschaften	69	226	19	2024
roots Hamburg	65	213	19	2024
Waterfront Towers West	60	213	14	2024
Waterfront Towers East	60	213	14	2024
EDGE Vattenfall Zentrale	57	187	15	2024
Perigon	57	187	18	2024
The Pier	55	180	14	2024
kbnk Tower Überseequartier	55	180	16	2024
AlsterGate	55	180	16	2024

== Proposed ==
Name	Height (m)	Height (ft)	Floors	Year
Elbbrücken 120	110	361	28	
Bahnhof Altona (South Tower)	76	249	19	
Hamburg Innovation Port	75	246	20	
Plaza Premium Hotel am Veritaskai	65	213	19	
Kongresshotel Elbbrücken	65	213	19	
Amsinckstraße 45	65	213	19	
Hammer Heart	60	197	17	2027
Ehemaliges Postamt 80	60	197	18	
Bahnhof Altona (North Tower)	58	190	15	
Naval	57	187	15	
Treetop Tower	51	167	14	

== Demolished ==
Name	Image	Height m (ft)	Floors	Opened	Demolished
Iduna-Hochhaus		89 m (292 ft)	23	1966	1995
Hermes-Hochhaus		86 m (282 ft)	23	1981	2019–2021
Oberpostdirektion		52 m (171 ft)	12	1976	2017
Hochhaus Am Hegen 82		50 m (164 ft)	17	1963	2004
Astra-Turm		50 m (164 ft)	14	1970	2005

== See also ==
- List of tallest buildings in Germany
- List of tallest structures in Germany
