= St. Nicholas Church, Hamburg =

Remains of church destroyed in 1943

Church of St. Nicholas
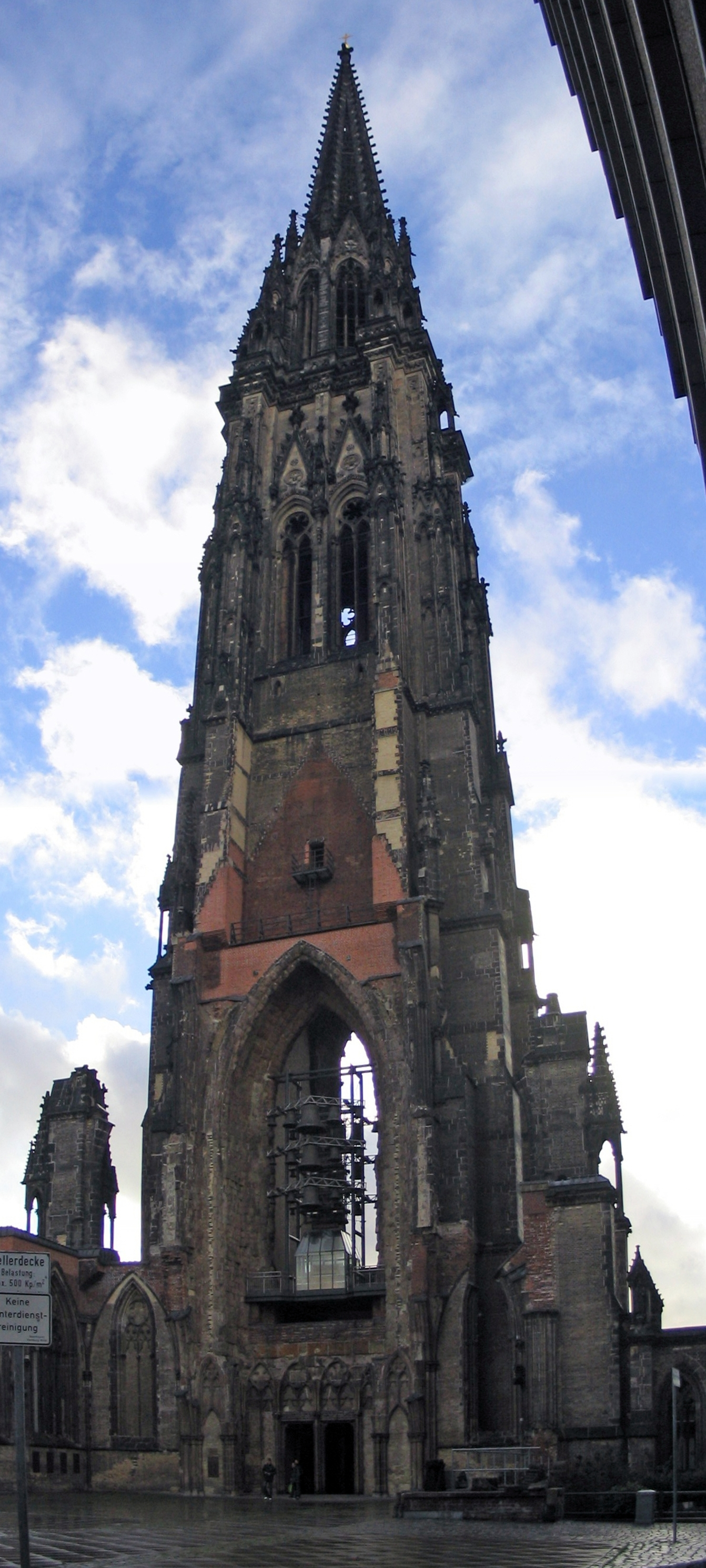

Record height
- Tallest in the world from 1874 to 1876^{[I]}
- Preceded by: Strasbourg Cathedral
- Surpassed by: Rouen Cathedral

General information
- Status: Ruined; only tower, spire and crypt survive.
- Location: Hamburg, Germany
- Coordinates: 53°32′51″N 9°59′26″E
- Construction started: 1189
- Completed: 1195
- Renovated: 1874

Height
- Antenna spire: 147 m (482 ft)

The Church of St. Nicholas (German: St.-Nikolai-Kirche) is a Gothic Revival cathedral that was formerly one of the five Lutheran Hauptkirchen (main churches) in the city of Hamburg, Germany. The original chapel, a wooden building, was completed in 1195. It was replaced by a brick church in the 14th century, which was eventually destroyed by fire in 1842. The church was completely rebuilt by 1874, and was the tallest building in the world from 1874 to 1876. It was designed by the English architect George Gilbert Scott.

The bombing of Hamburg in World War II in 1943 destroyed the bulk of the church. The removal of the rubble left only its crypt, its site and tall-spired tower, largely hollow save for a large set of bells. These ruins continue to serve as a memorial and an important architectural landmark. When Hamburg residents mention the Nikolaikirche, it is generally to this church that they are referring, and not the new Hauptkirche dedicated to Saint Nicholas in the Harvestehude district. The remains of the old church are the second-tallest structure in Hamburg. In 2005, an elevator was installed to a 75.3-metre-high (247 ft) platform.

== History ==
=== Older structures ===
With the founding of the Nikolai settlement and a harbor on the Alster in the 12th century, a chapel dedicated to Saint Nicholas, patron saint of sailors, was erected. This wood building was the second church in Hamburg, after St. Mary's Cathedral.

In 1335, some years before the onslaught of the Black Death, construction on a new brick building began. The structure was to be a three-naved hall church in the typical North German Brick Gothic style. This building stood until the middle of the 19th century, undergoing changes, expansions, and withstanding several partial destructions. The tower, which was erected in 1517, burned down in 1589. The tower built to replace it collapsed in 1644. The last tower of the old Church of St. Nicholas was designed by Peter Marquardt. The Marquardt tower had a height of 122 metres (400 ft), and with its characteristic dome was a landmark of the city and jewel of its skyline.

As the center of one of the four Hamburg parishes, the Church of St. Nicholas was heavily involved in all of the theological debates that were fought out in the city, especially during the Reformation. After the minister Henning Kissenbrügge resigned in 1524, the residents chose as minister Johannes Bugenhagen, a profiled Reformer and confidant to Martin Luther. The conservative city council was able to prevent his appointment by making Kissenbrügge stay. However, they could not stop the general wave of elected Lutheran ministers in Hamburg; in the Church of St. Nicholas, Johann Zegenhagen was appointed after Kissenbrügge's final departure. The Reformation was completed peacefully, and in 1528 Bugenhagen appeared in Hamburg and became the preacher at the Church of St. Nicholas. He is known for establishing a church order in Hamburg which regulated finances and other church affairs such as the school curriculum. This order continued for 200 years.

The old Church of St. Nicholas was the first large public building to burn in the Great Fire of Hamburg of May 1842. The destruction of the Church of St. Nicholas is described by chroniclers as a particularly moving event for the citizens. It was the first large building to burn, and was an indication of how catastrophic the fire would become. On 5 May, the noon service held by preacher Wendt, who stood in for the minister Carl Moenckeberg, had to be cut short and ended with an intercessory prayer for the saving of the church. One obviously did not count on the loss of the church as most art treasures were not saved. The tower was engulfed by the fire at about four o'clock in the afternoon. Despite desperate efforts, it was not possible to contain the fire due to the equipment of the day, which did not allow water to be carried in sufficient quantity to the heights of the tower. It finally collapsed, setting the nave on fire and burning it completely.

=== Neo-Gothic construction ===
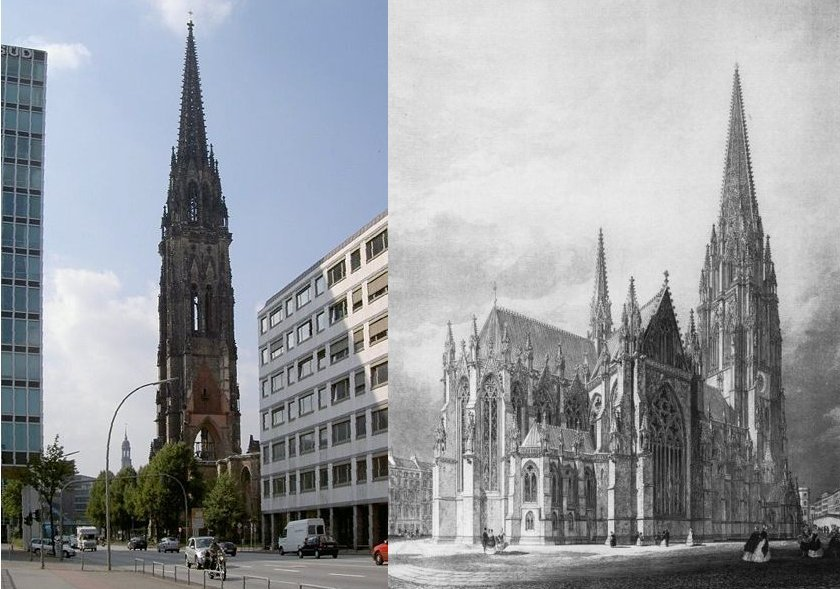
Right: The neo-Gothic church. Left: the tower that survived.

Shortly after the fire, the church was rebuilt again. In 1843, a so-called "shilling collection" was started, and in 1844 there was an architectural competition, won by the architect Gottfried Semper (a native of nearby Altona) with the draft of a Romanesque domed structure. His design, however, was not realized, as it did not fit into Hamburg's townscape. Shortly before this time, the completion of the medieval Cologne cathedral in 1842 had led to a Gothic Revival in Germany. Hamburg's own medieval cathedral had been demolished in 1805.

The English architect George Gilbert Scott, who was an expert in the restoration of medieval churches and an advocate of the Gothic architectural style, was commissioned to devise a new design. He designed an 86-metre-long (282 ft) nave, with a 28-metre-high (92 ft) vault. The architecture was strongly influenced by French and English Gothic styles, though the pointed spire is typically German. The amount of sculptures made from sandstone in the interior and on the tower was unusual. The new church was built to the southeast, a short distance from the old location, where the Neue Burg (New Castle) had once stood. Construction began in 1846, and on 27 September 1863 the church was consecrated. The 147.3-metre-high (483 ft) tower was finished in 1874. At that time, the Church of St. Nicholas became the tallest building in the world, which it remained until the completion of the cathedral of Rouen in 1876. Second only to the TV tower, the tower of the church is still the second tallest building in Hamburg.

=== 20th Century ===
==== World War II ====
The clearly visible tower of the Church of St. Nicholas served as a goal and orientation marker for pilots of the Allied Air Forces during the extensive air raids on Hamburg. On 28 July 1943, the church was heavily damaged by aerial bombs. The roof collapsed and the interior of the nave suffered heavy damage. The walls began to show cracks, yet neither they nor the tower collapsed.

==== Post-War ====
After the war, the basic structure of the Gothic church remained intact to a large extent and reconstruction was a realistic option. Nevertheless, it was decided to demolish the nave while leaving the tower untouched. As the vicinity of the church was no longer a residential area, a new Church of St. Nicholas was built in the district of Harvestehude. In 1951, the nave was finally demolished and the rubble was partially used for the reinforcement of the banks of the River Elbe. The loss of a valuable Gothic revival architectural monument was regretted by many, but after the war there were other priorities as far as reconstruction was concerned. Compared to the Church of Michael the Archangel, the Church of St. Nicholas was not regarded as one of Hamburg's most important landmarks.

The tower and some remains of the wall have since been preserved as a memorial against war. For several decades they were not cared for, and, consequently, they gradually decayed. In 1987, the Rettet die Nikolaikirche e.V. (Rescue St. Nicholas's Church) foundation began to restore the existing fabric of the building and erected a so-called "place of encounters" (a room for events and exhibitions) in the crypt. The organization attempts to salvage pieces of rubble that were removed in 1951, such as pieces from the destroyed nave pulled from the River Elbe in November 2000. A reconstruction of the church, as done with the Church of Our Lady in Dresden, is not intended. However, a 51-bell carillon was installed in 1993 as a memorial.

=== Present day ===
The current condition of the Church of St. Nicholas is the result of the bombing of Hamburg in World War II, the removal of its ruined walls and rubble in 1951 and restoration work to the tower in the 1990s and 2012. The Rettet die Nikolaikirche e.V. foundation works to restore the tower further and improve its memorial role, supported by the city of Hamburg, the congregation of the Hauptkirche and various corporate sponsors and private contributors. The organization is charged with maintaining the building's existing structure, restoration, arranging events and displays in the church, and operating an information center housed in the church's crypt.

Since 1 September 2005, an elevator has taken visitors to a 75.3-metre-high (247 ft) platform inside the tower to history panels and a panoramic view over Hamburg and in particular the nearby Speicherstadt (lit. "city of warehouses").

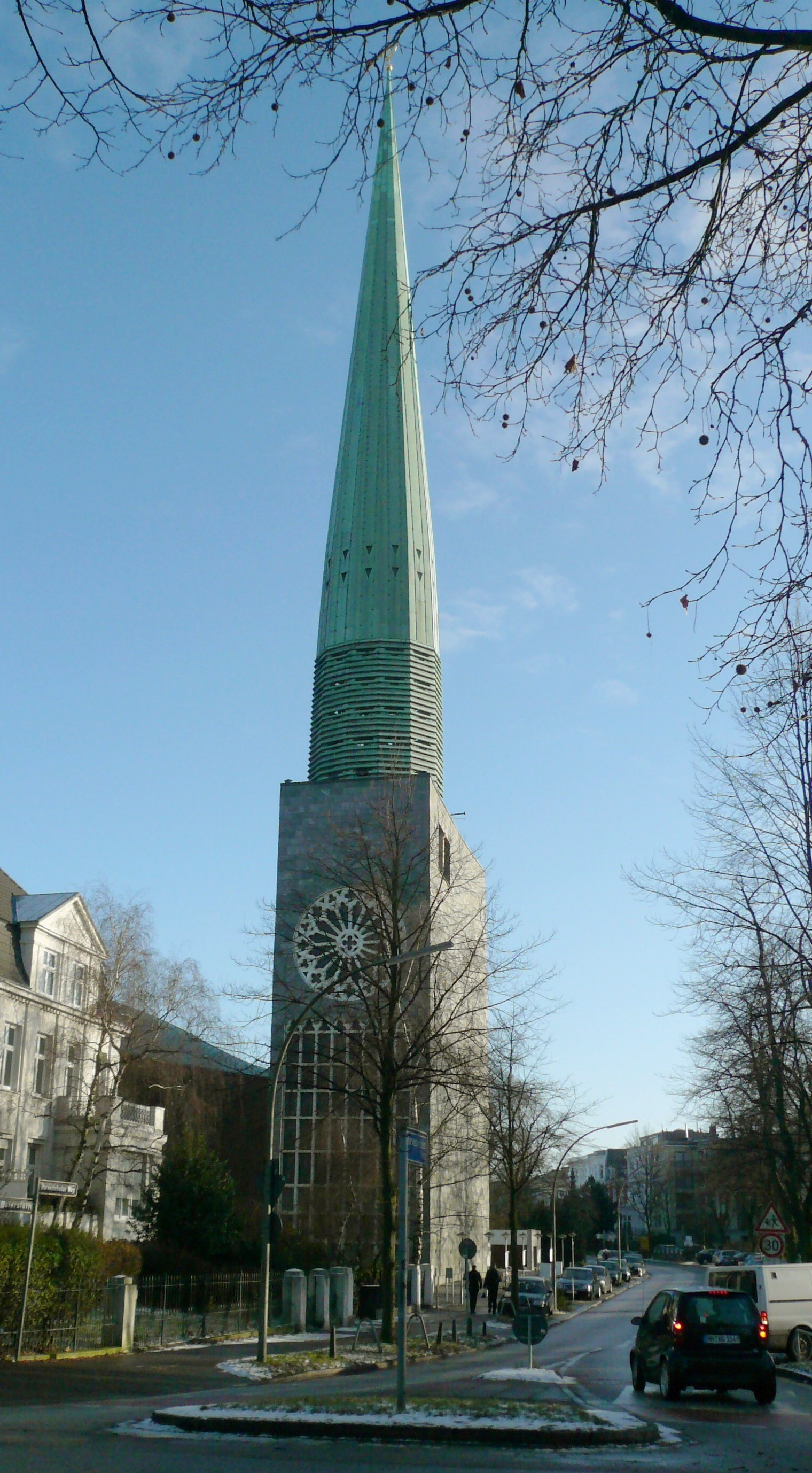
New Church of St. Nicholas in Harvestehude

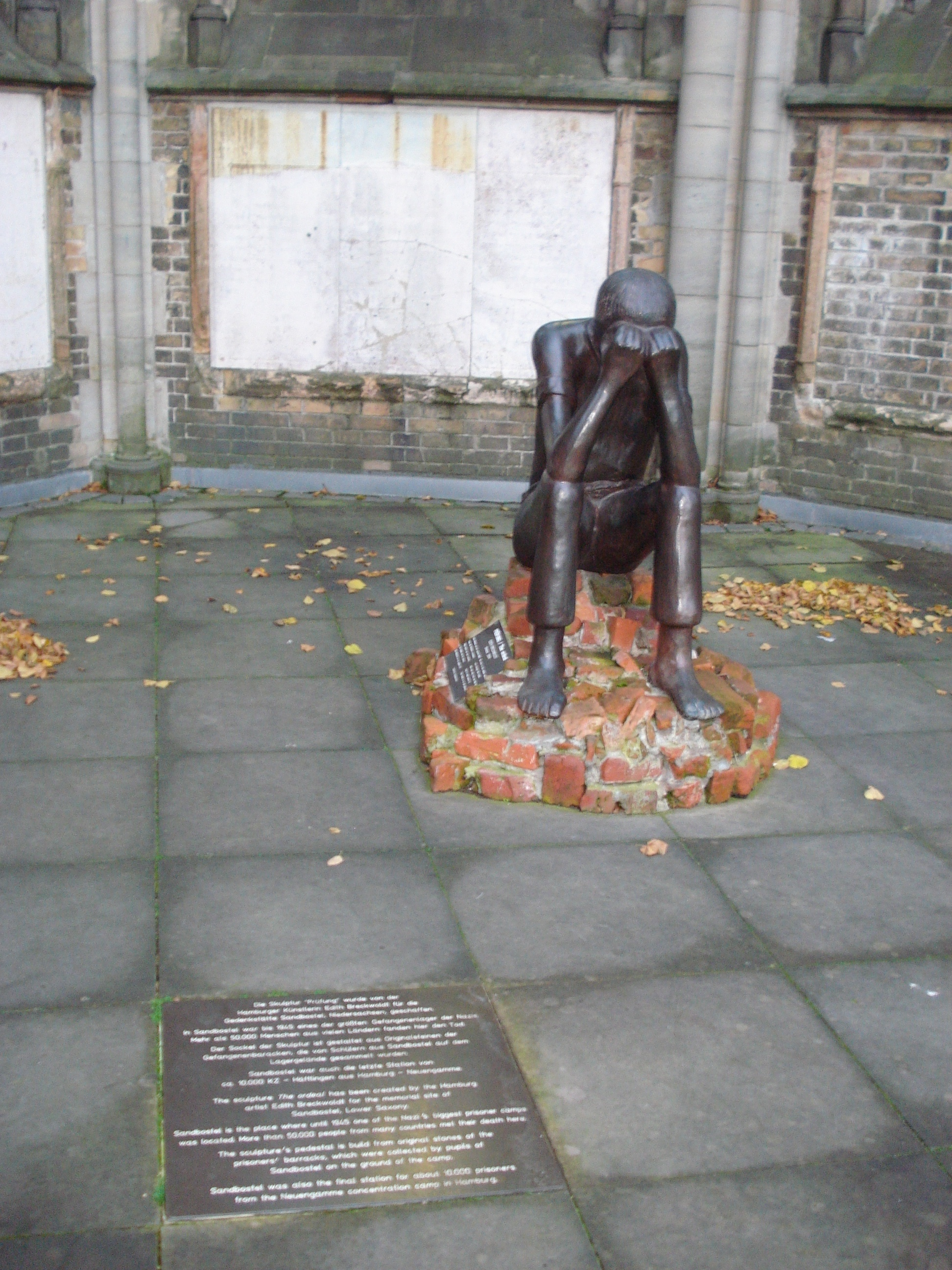
Prüfung—sculpture in the southern aisle

== See also ==
- List of tallest structures built before the 20th century

Records
Preceded by Strasbourg Cathedral	World's tallest structure 1874–1876; 147 m	Succeeded by Rouen Cathedral
