= Rathaus station (Hamburg U-Bahn) =

Railway station in Hamburg, Germany

Rathaus
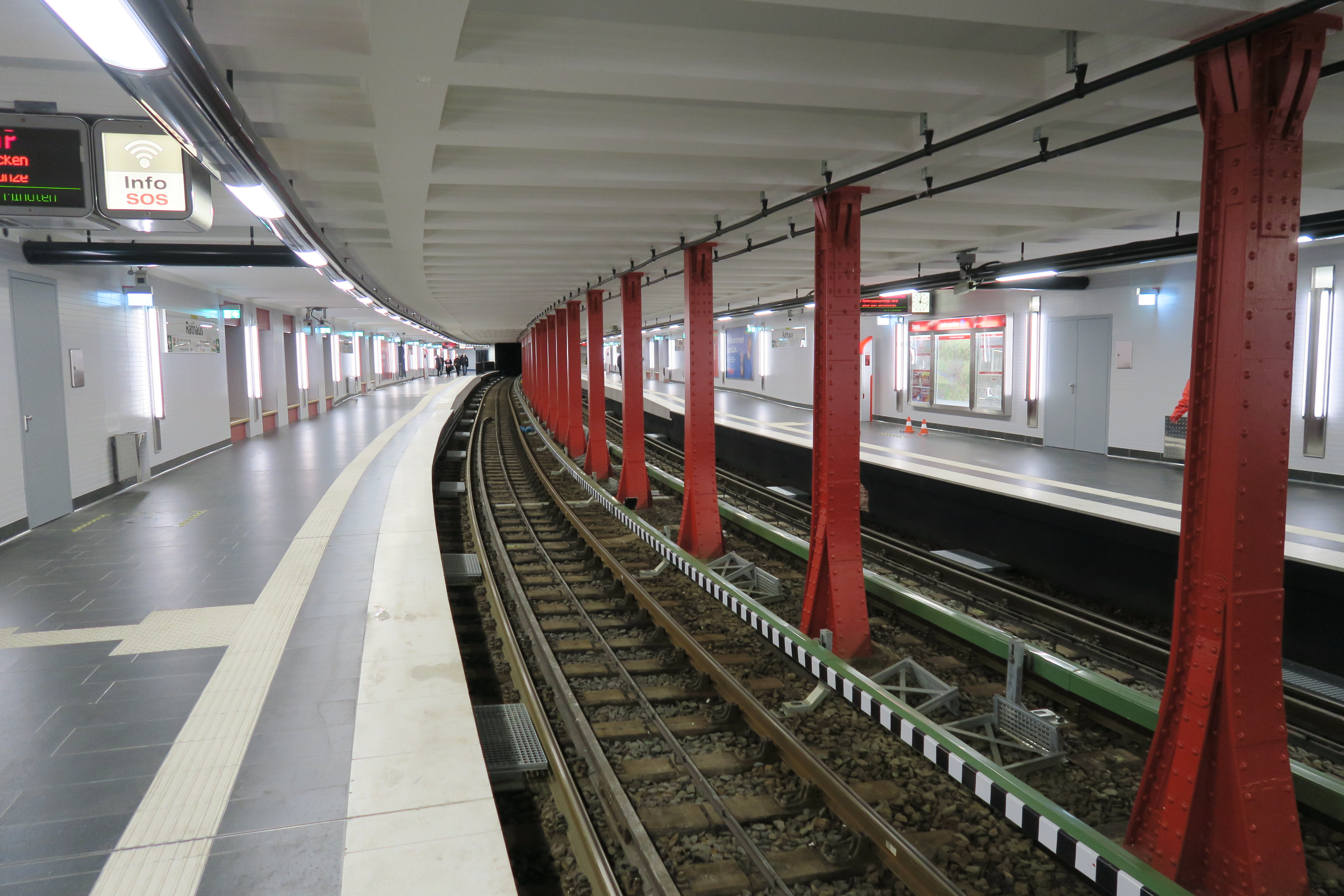

General information
- Location: Rathausmarkt; 20095 Hamburg, Germany
- Coordinates: 53°33′01″N 09°59′37″E
- System: Hamburg U-Bahn station
- Operator: Hamburger Hochbahn AG
- Line: U3
- Platforms: 2 side platforms
- Tracks: 2
- Connections: Bus, Taxi

Construction
- Structure type: Underground
- Accessible: Yes

Other information
- Station code: HHA: RA
- Fare zone: HVV: A/000

History
- Opened: 5 February 1912; 114 years ago
- Former names: 1912–1934 Rathausmarkt; 1934–1945 Adolf-Hitler-Platz; 1945–1958 Rathausmarkt

Services
Preceding station	Hamburg U-Bahn	Following station
Rödingsmarkt towards Barmbek	U3	Mönckebergstraße towards Wandsbek-Gartenstadt
Location
- Location within Hamburg Location within Schleswig-Holstein Location within Germany Location within Europe

Rathaus station is a Hamburg U-Bahn metro station located at Rathausmarkt in the Altstadt of Hamburg, Germany. The station first opened in 1912 and is named by the Hamburg Rathaus.

== Service ==
Rathaus is served by Hamburg U-Bahn line U3; departures are every 5 minutes. A pedestrian underpass connects Rathaus station with Jungfernstieg station, one of Hamburg's busiest rapid transit hubs.

== Gallery ==
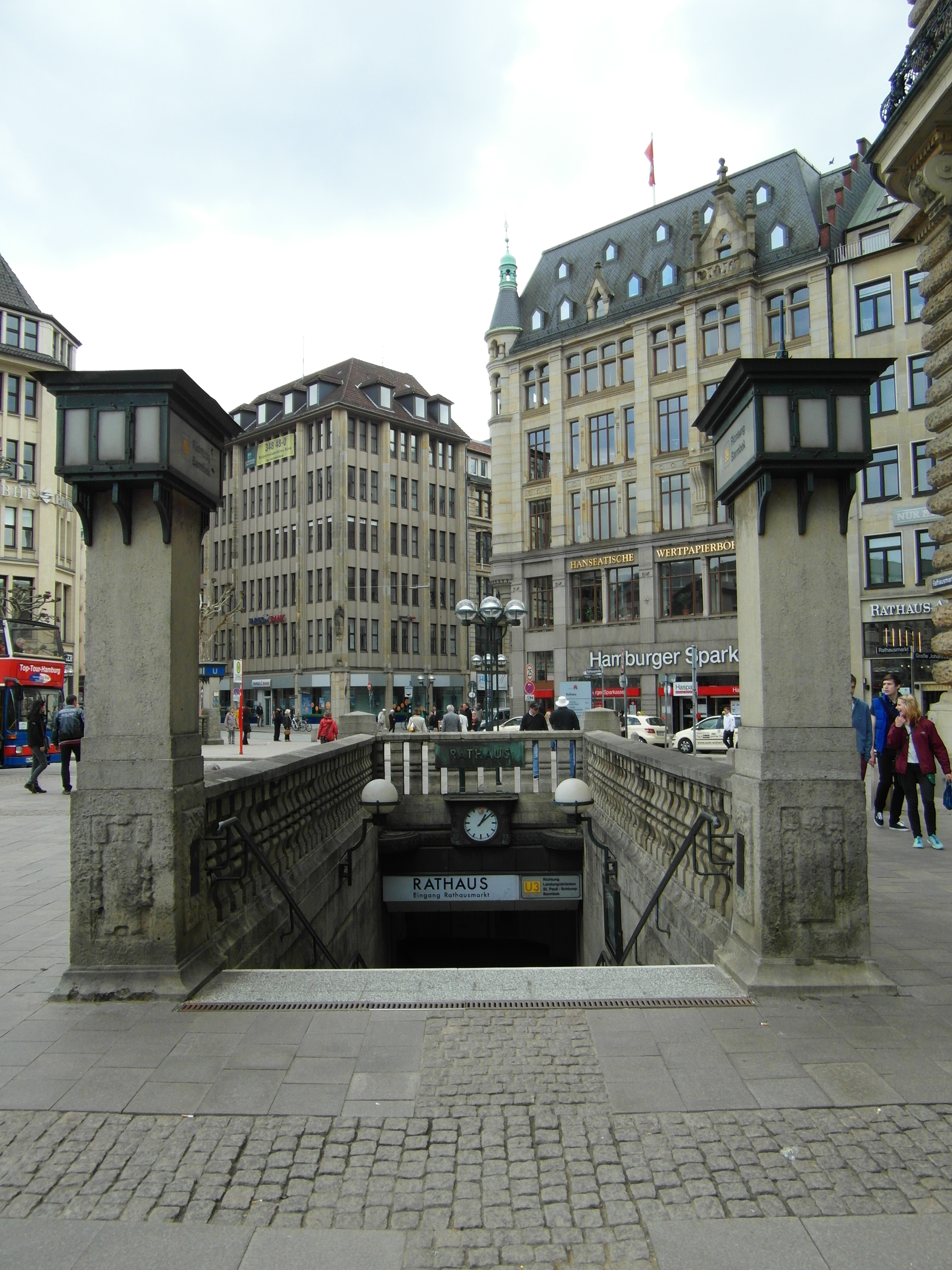
Entrance to the station

== See also ==
- List of Hamburg U-Bahn stations
