= Atlantic-Haus =

High-rise in Hamburg

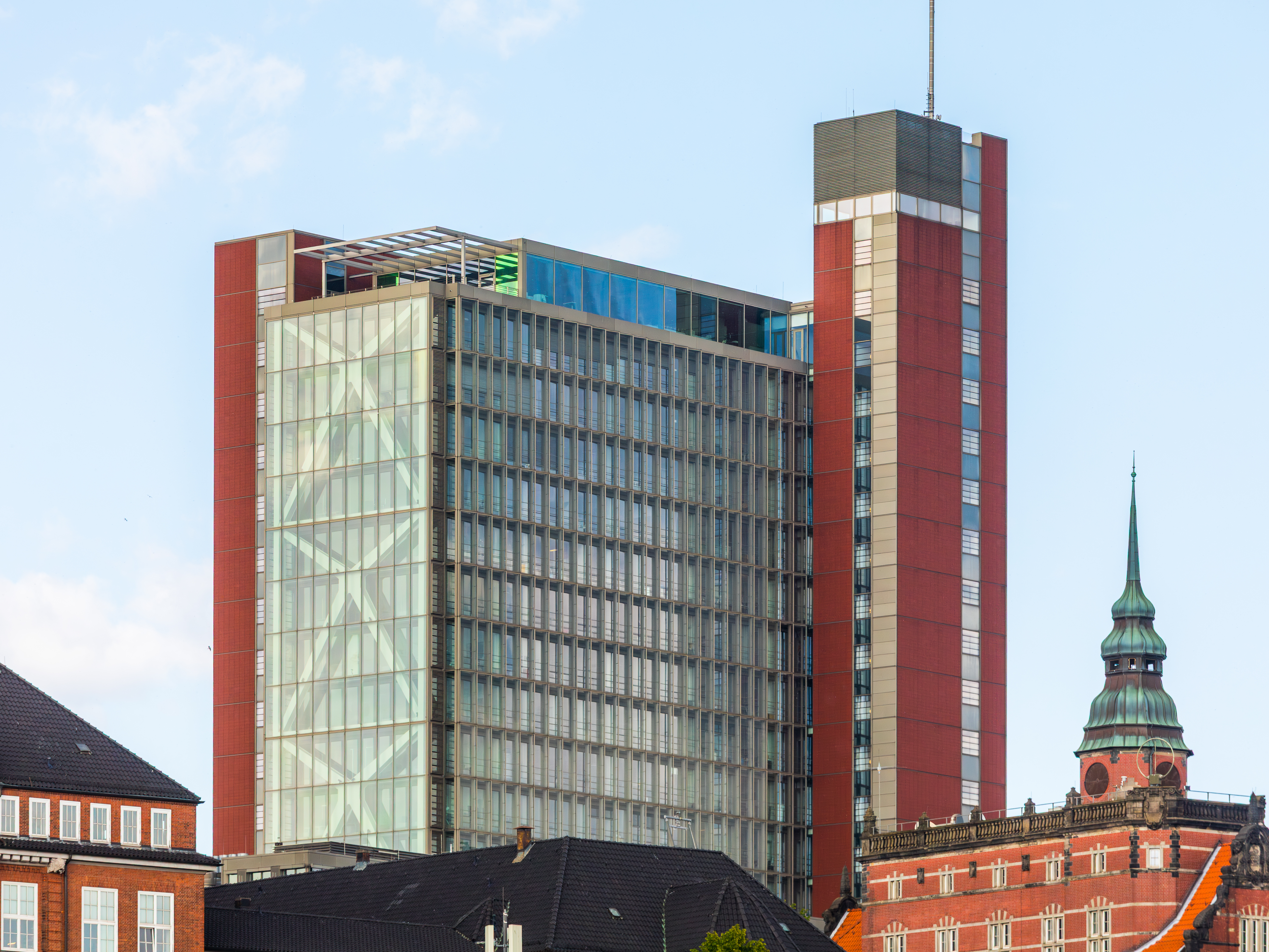
- Atlantic-Haus

General information
- Type: high-rise
- Address: Bernhard-Nocht-Straße 113, St. Pauli, Hamburg
- Coordinates: 53°32′51″N 9°58′3″E
- Completed: 2007
- Height: 88 m (289 ft)

Technical details
- Floor count: 21
- Floor area: 34,000 m^{2} (370,000 sq ft)

Design and construction
- Architect(s): Herzog + Partner

Website
- atlantic-haus.info

Atlantic-Haus is an 88 m high-rise office building in the St. Pauli district of Hamburg. Designed by Munich-based architect Thomas Herzog and completed in 2007, the Atlantic-Haus is part of a cluster of high-rises at Hamburg's Hafenkrone, an area between the St. Pauli Piers and St. Pauli's Reeperbahn district.

== See also ==
- List of tallest buildings in Hamburg
- List of tallest buildings in Germany
