= Hanseatic Trade Center =

Office complex in Hamburg, Germany

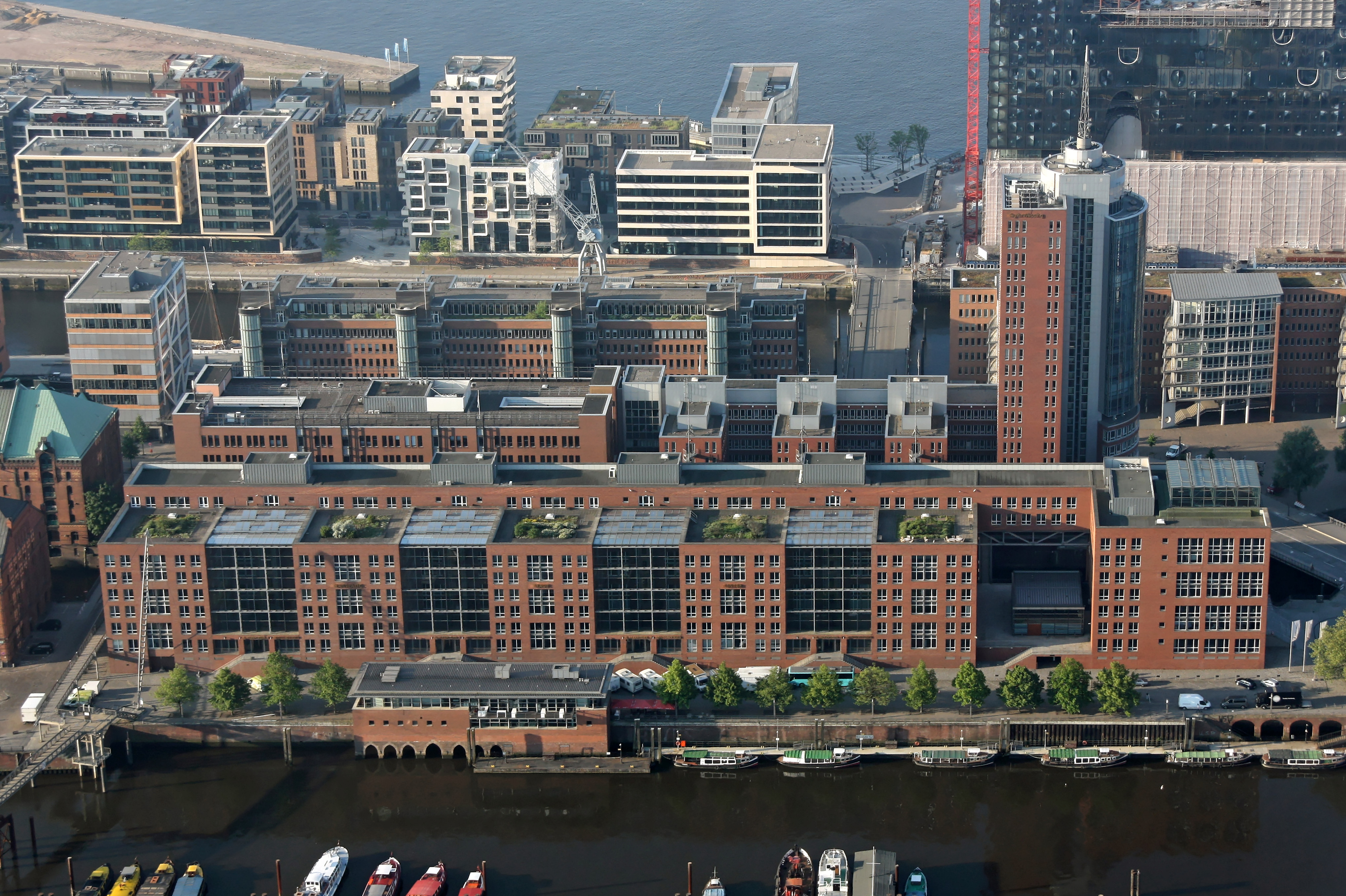
- Hanseatic Trade Center, aerial view from the North
- Interactive map of the Hanseatic Trade Center area

General information
- Status: Completed
- Location: HafenCity, Hamburg
- Coordinates: 53°32′33″N 9°59′4″E
- Named for: Hanseatic League
- Groundbreaking: 1990
- Opened: 1997
- Cost: € 400 million

Height
- Tip: 104 m

Technical details
- Material: red brick, glass
- Floor count: 23
- Floor area: 93,000 m^{2} (1,000,000 sq ft)

The Hanseatic Trade Center (HTC) is a major office complex in the HafenCity of Hamburg, Germany. Developed after an urban design competition in the 1980s, and built in five phases during the 1990s, it was the first new construction in the urban renewal of this part of the Port of Hamburg. Parts of the Hanseatic Trade Center along Kehrwiederfleet complement the historic Speicherstadt, while its western end at Kehrwiederspitze features two high-rise structures.

== Overview ==
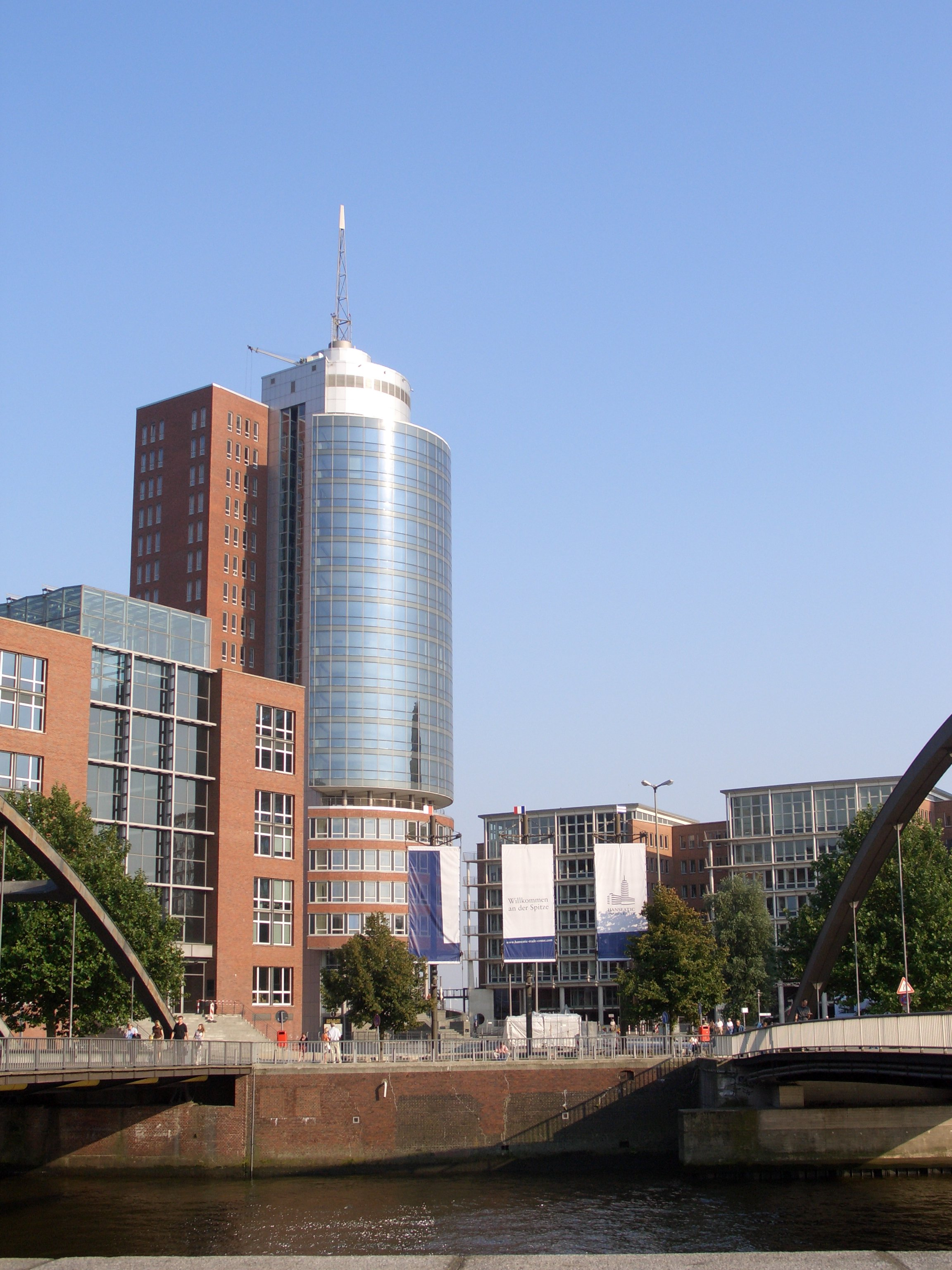
The Columbus-Haus

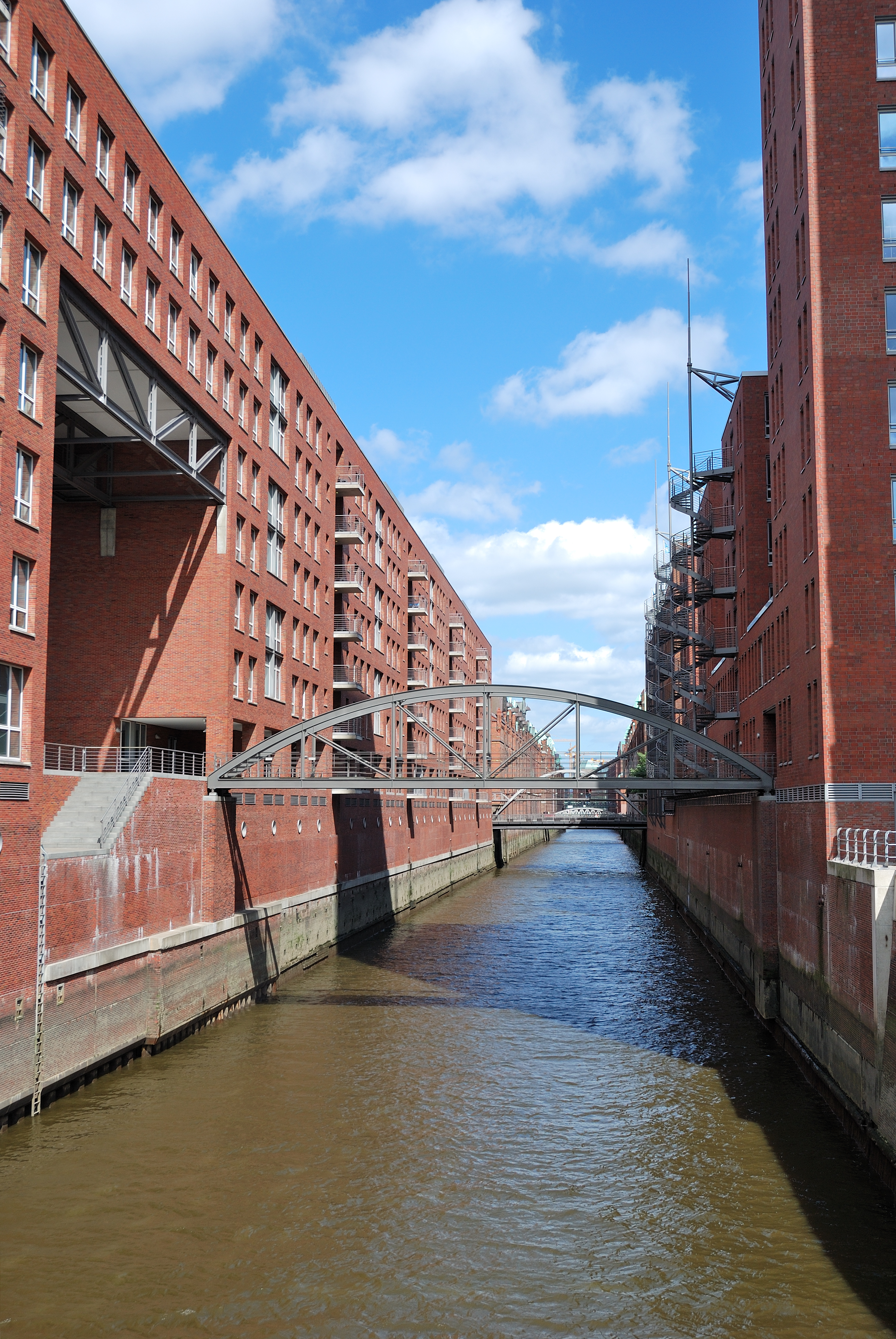
The HTC at Kehrwiederfleet

The Hanseatic Trade Center comprises a total floor area of 93,000 m^{2} (1,000,000 sq ft). It is located on the western tip of HafenCity, surrounded by water on three sides. To the north, Binnenhafen separates it from Hamburg's Altstadt (old town), to the south it is facing Sandtorhafen and HafenCity proper. Public transport is available at Baumwall station, just across Niederbaumbrücke.

During construction and the first years after, the five buildings were named by order of development phase. When Tishman Speyer Properties and Quantum Immobilien AG acquired four of the five buildings in 2005, the buildings were subsequently marketed by names of famous explorers and seafarers:

- Phase I: Vespucci-Haus (1993) by Kohn Pedersen Fox
- Phase II: Columbus-Haus (2002) by Nägele, Hofmann & Tiedemann
- Phase III: Humboldt-Haus (1992) by Dieter Heusch
- Phase IV: Amundsen-Haus (1999) by Gerkan, Marg & Partner
- Phase V: Kehrwiederspitze (1997) by Kleffel, Köhnholdt & Gundermann

Kehrwiederspitze was the only building not sold in 2005. The entire complex lies within the flood-exposed area of the Lower Elbe. Therefore, all five buildings are connected by a network of upper floor boardwalks among each other and to the inner-city.

== See also ==
- List of tallest buildings in Hamburg
- List of tallest buildings in Germany
- List of world trade centers
