= Thomas Herzog =

German architect (born 1941)

Thomas Herzog (born 3 August 1941) is a German architect from Munich known for his focus on climate and energy use through the use of technologically advanced architectural skins. He began with an interest in pneumatics and became Germany's youngest architecture professor at the age of 32. He established his firm Herzog + Partner in 1983.

== Biography ==
- 1941 Born in Munich. High school diploma (Abitur)
- 1960–1965 Studied architecture at the Technical University of Munich (TUM). Diploma
- 1965–1969 Assistant at the office of Prof. Peter C. von Seidlein in Munich
- 1969–1973 Scientific assistant at the University of Stuttgart
- 1972 Doctorate in architecture, University of Rome "La Sapienza" | Dissertation 'Pneumatic Structures'
- 1971 Founded own practice
- Since then has worked jointly with Verena Herzog-Loibl, Dipl.-Designer
  - Development of building systems for the use of renewable forms of energy
  - Development of new building products
  - Housing, administration, industrial and exhibition buildings, etc.
- 1983–1989 Partnership with Michael Volz
- 1994–2012 Partnership with Hanns Jörg Schrade
- 1974–86 Professor of Architecture at the University of Kassel
- 1986–93 – at Technical University Darmstadt
- 1993-06 – at the Technical University of Munich (TUM)
- 2000–06 Dean of the Faculty of Architecture at TUM
- since 2003 Guest professor
  - at Tsinghua University, Beijing
  - at Ecole Polytechnique Féderal de Lausanne EPFL2003
  - Graham Professor at the University of Pennsylvania (PENN)
- 2004 at the Royal Danish Academy Copenhagen
- 1982–98 Commencement of research and development work on renewable energies in building for the European Commission in Brussels
- since 1998 R + D funding from Federal German Foundation of the Environment (DBU)
- 1996 Chairman of the 4th European Conference on Solar Energy in Architecture and Urban Planning
- 2000 German General Commissioner of the International Biennale of Architecture in Venice
- 2000–2006 Expert "Deutsche Forschungsgemeinschaft" DfG
- 2007 "Emeritus of Excellence", TUM
- 2002–2008 Commissioner German Academy of Art, Villa Massimo, Rom

== Notable projects ==
Source.

- 1966–1968: Summerhouse at Chiemsee with R+R Then Bergh
- 1977–1979: House Regensburg
- 1981–1983: Housing Group Kranichstein, Darmstadt
- 1986–1989: Two-family house, Pullach
- 1987–1991: Guest building for the Youth Educational Centre, Windberg
- 1989–1992: Production halls and central energy plant, Eimbeckhausen
- 1988–1993: Design-Center, congress and exhibition centre, Linz, Austria
- 1988–1993: Congress hotel, Linz, Austria
- 1994–1996: Hall 26, Hanover Trade Fair (Deutsche Messe AG)
- 1994–2003: Administration Centre, Wiesbaden
- 1995–2004: Concept for SOLARCITY and social housing, Linz, Austria
- 1999–2000: Large-scale roof structure with pavilions, Hanover (EXPODACH)
- 2002–2006: Leibniz-Rechenzentrum, Garching near Munich
- 2005: Wohnquartier Shenyang, Volksrepublik China
- 2004–2007: Atlantic-Haus, Hamburg, Germany
- 2005–2007: Wohnungsbau in Aarhus, Dänemark
- 2005–2008: Planung zusammen mit F. Tucci Solare Wohnbauten für die Stadt Rom Lunghezzina II
- 2006: Kunstakademie Guangzhou, Volksrepublik China
- 2006–2009: Oskar von Miller Forum, Munich

== Awards ==
- 1971: Rompreis, Deutsche Akademie Rom Villa Massimo
- 1981: Mies-van-der-Rohe-Preis
- 1993: Großer BDA Preis
- 1994: Balthasar-Neumann-Preis of the Bundes Deutscher Baumeister, Architekten und Ingenieure
- 1994: Kulturpreis des Landes Oberösterreich for architecture, with Hanns Jörg Schrade and Heinz Stögmüller
- 1996: Auguste-Perret-Preis of the Union Internationale des Architectes
- 1996: Architekturpreis der Landeshauptstadt München
- 1998: Den grønne Nål of Dänischen Architektenbundes (Akademisk Arkitektforening), Kopenhagen
- 1998: Leo-von-Klenze-Medaille
- 1998: Grande médaille d'or du Prix de l'Académie d'Architecture de France, Paris
- 1999: Fritz-Schumacher-Preis für Architektur
- 2000: Europäischer Preis für Solares Bauen
- 2005: Heinz-Maier-Leibnitz-Medaille of the Technical University of Munich (TUM)
- 2006: European award for architecture and technology
- 2007: International Architecture Award, Chicago Athenaeum
- 2007: Honorary doctorate of the University of Ferrara, Italy
- 2009: Global Award for Sustainable Architecture
- 2016: Bayerischer Verdienstorden

== Memberships ==
- Académie d'Architecture, Paris
- Akademie der Künste, Berlin
- Bayerische Akademie der Schönen Künste, Munich
- Petrov Academy of Fine Arts and Sciences, Saint Petersburg, Russland
- International Academy of Architecture, UNESCO, Sofia, Bulgarien
- Fraunhofer Gesellschaft
- PLEA
- EUROSOLAR
- Bund Deutscher Architekten BDA
- Deutscher Werkbund
