= Mönckebergstraße station =

Railway station in Hamburg, Germany

Coordinates: 53.5512°N 10.0014°E

Mönckebergstraße
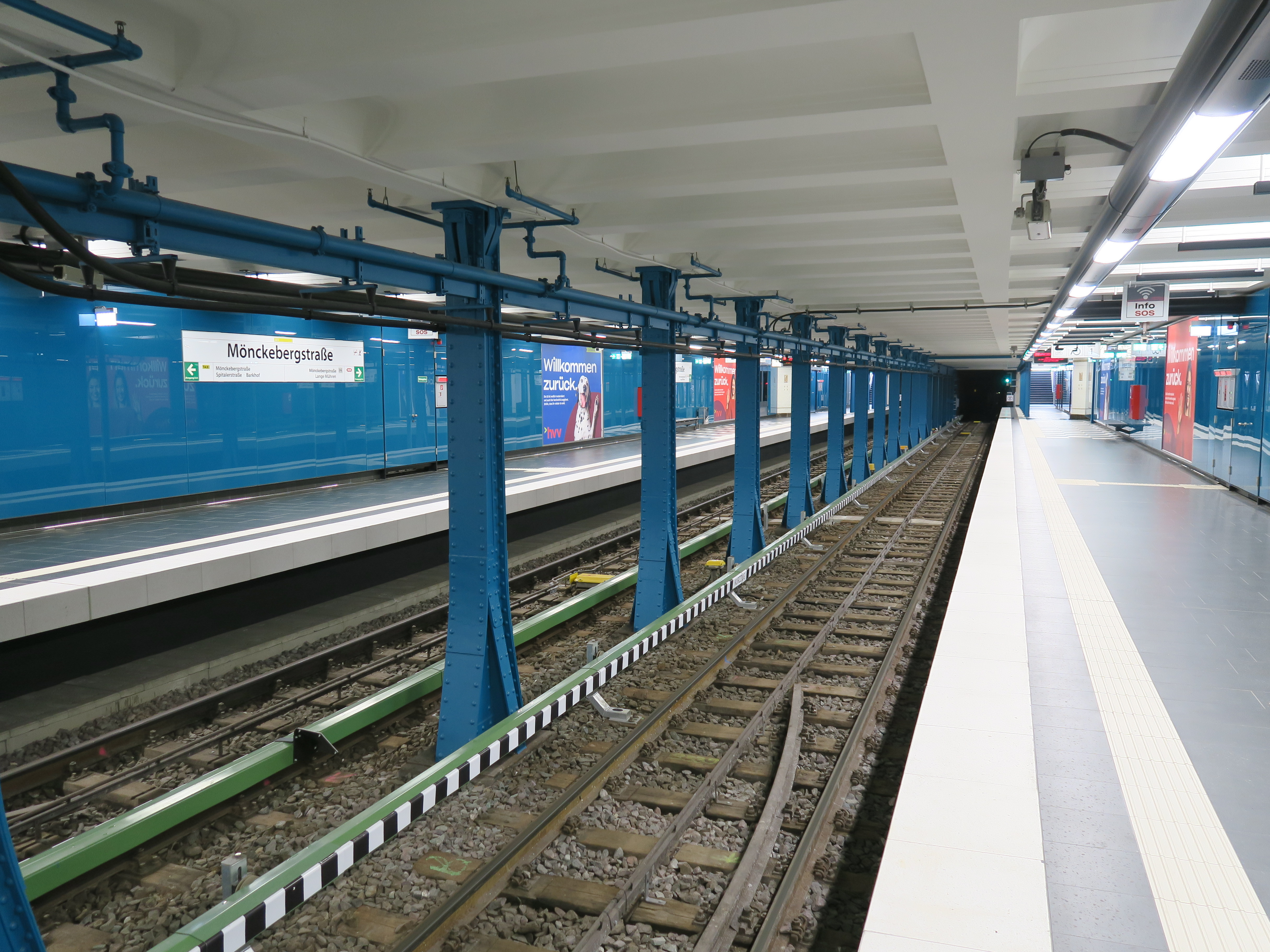

General information
- Location: Hamburg, Germany
- System: Hamburg U-Bahn station
- Platforms: 2 island platforms
- Tracks: 2

Construction
- Structure type: Underground
- Accessible: Yes

Other information
- Fare zone: HVV: A/000

History
- Opened: 15 February 1912; 114 years ago
- Former names: 1912-1950 Barkhof

Services
Preceding station	Hamburg U-Bahn	Following station
Rathaus towards Barmbek	U3	Hauptbahnhof Süd towards Wandsbek-Gartenstadt
Location
- Location within Hamburg Location within Schleswig-Holstein Location within Germany Location within Europe

Mönckebergstraße station is a Hamburg U-Bahn station located on the Mönckebergstraße in Hamburg-Altstadt. It first opened in 1912.
