= Rödingsmarkt station =

Railway station in Hamburg, Germany

Rödingsmarkt
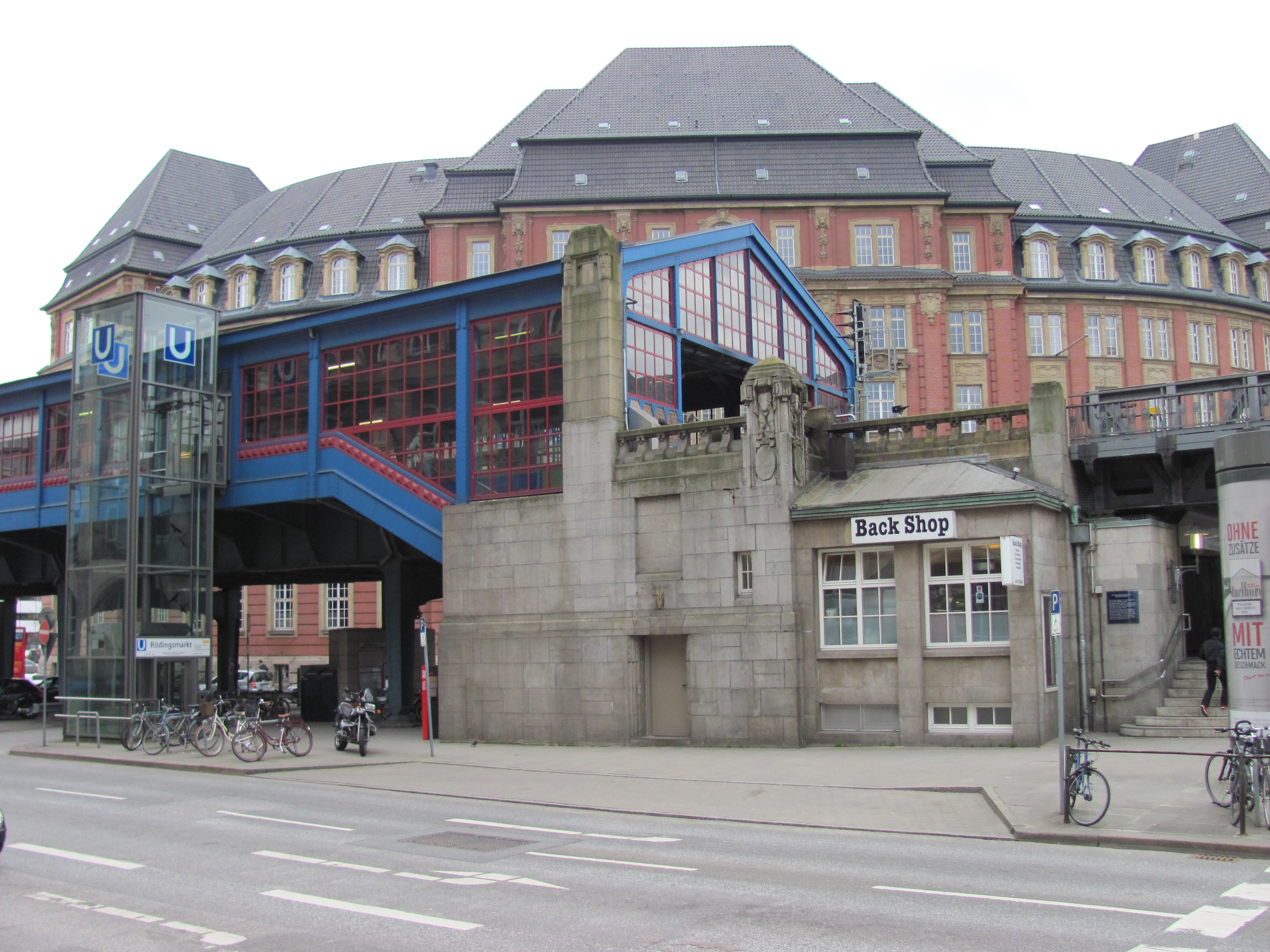

General information
- Location: Rödingsmarkt; 20459 Hamburg, Germany
- Coordinates: 53°32′54″N 09°59′13″E
- System: Hamburg U-Bahn station
- Operator: Hamburger Hochbahn AG
- Line: U3
- Platforms: 2 side platforms
- Tracks: 2
- Connections: Bus, Taxi

Construction
- Structure type: Elevated
- Accessible: Yes

Other information
- Station code: HHA: RD
- Fare zone: HVV: A/000

History
- Opened: 29 June 1912; 114 years ago

Services
Preceding station	Hamburg U-Bahn	Following station
Baumwall towards Barmbek	U3	Rathaus towards Wandsbek-Gartenstadt
Location
- Location within Hamburg Location within Schleswig-Holstein Location within Germany Location within Europe

Rödingsmarkt is an elevated metro station on the Hamburg U-Bahn line U3. It was opened in 1912 and is located in the borough of Hamburg-Mitte in Hamburg, Germany.

== Service ==
=== Trains ===
Rödingsmarkt is served by Hamburg U-Bahn line U3; departures are every 5 minutes.

== See also ==
- List of Hamburg U-Bahn stations
