= Heinrich Hertz Tower =

Radio telecommunication tower

Heinrich Hertz Tower Heinrich-Hertz-Turm
- Fernsehturm
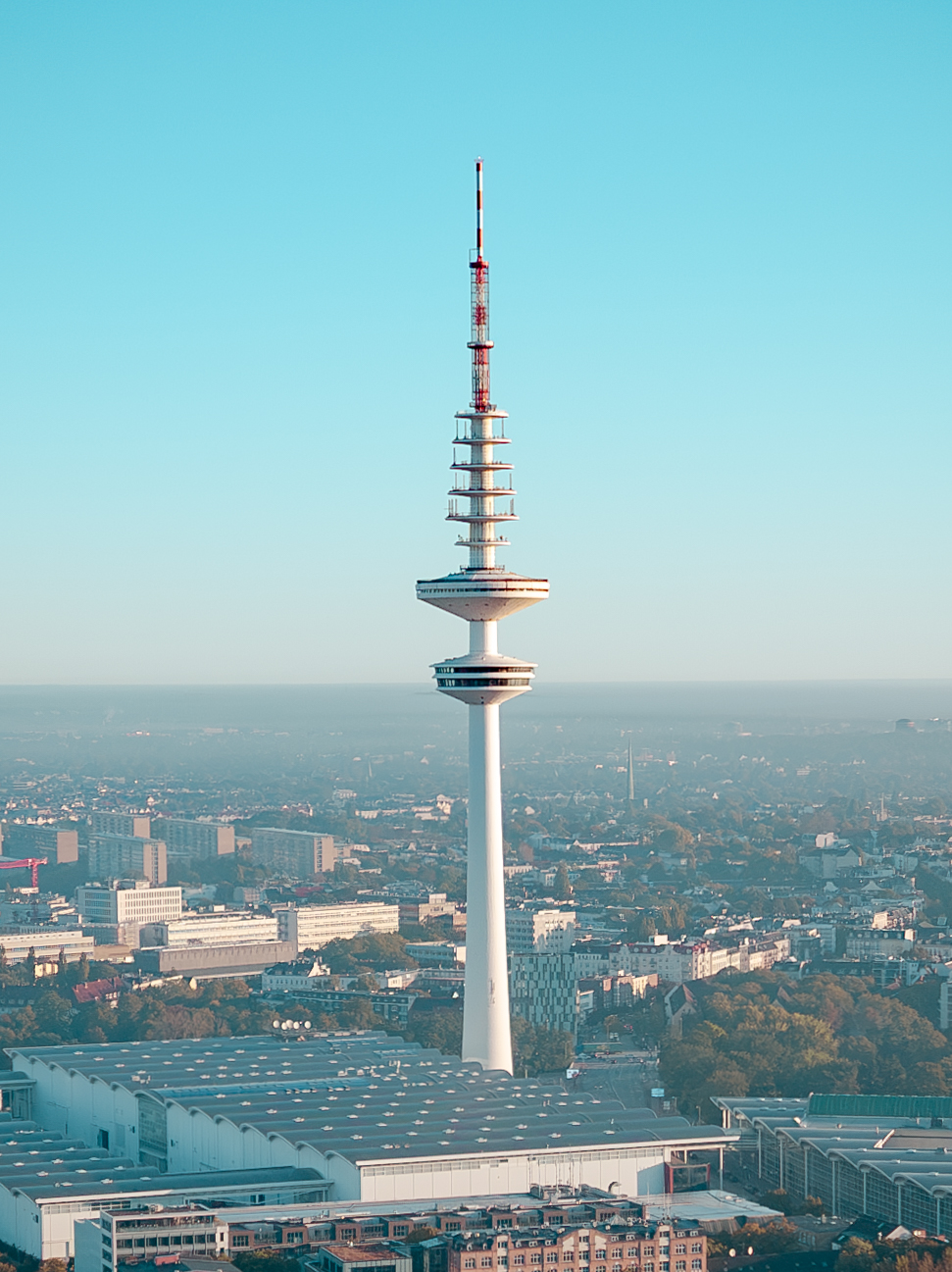
- Heinrich-Hertz-Turm

- Location within Hamburg Location within Germany

General information
- Type: Radio telecommunication tower
- Location: Hamburg, Germany
- Coordinates: 53°33′47″N 9°58′33″E
- Current tenants: no
- Construction started: 1966
- Completed: 1968
- Owner: Deutsche Funkturm GmbH (DFMG)

Height
- Height: 279.2 m (916 ft)

Design and construction
- Architects: Fritz Trautwein, Rafael Behn
- Civil engineer: Jörg Schlaich, Rudolf Bergermann, Fritz Leonhardt

The Heinrich Hertz Tower (German: Heinrich-Hertz-Turm) is a landmark radio telecommunication tower in the city of Hamburg, Germany.

Designed by architect Fritz Trautwein, in co-operation with civil engineers Jörg Schlaich, Rudolf Bergermann and Fritz Leonhardt, the tower was built between 1965–1968 for the former Deutsche Bundespost (German Federal Post and Telecommunications Agency, now Deutsche Telekom's subsidiary Deutsche Funkturm GmbH) near Planten un Blomen park.

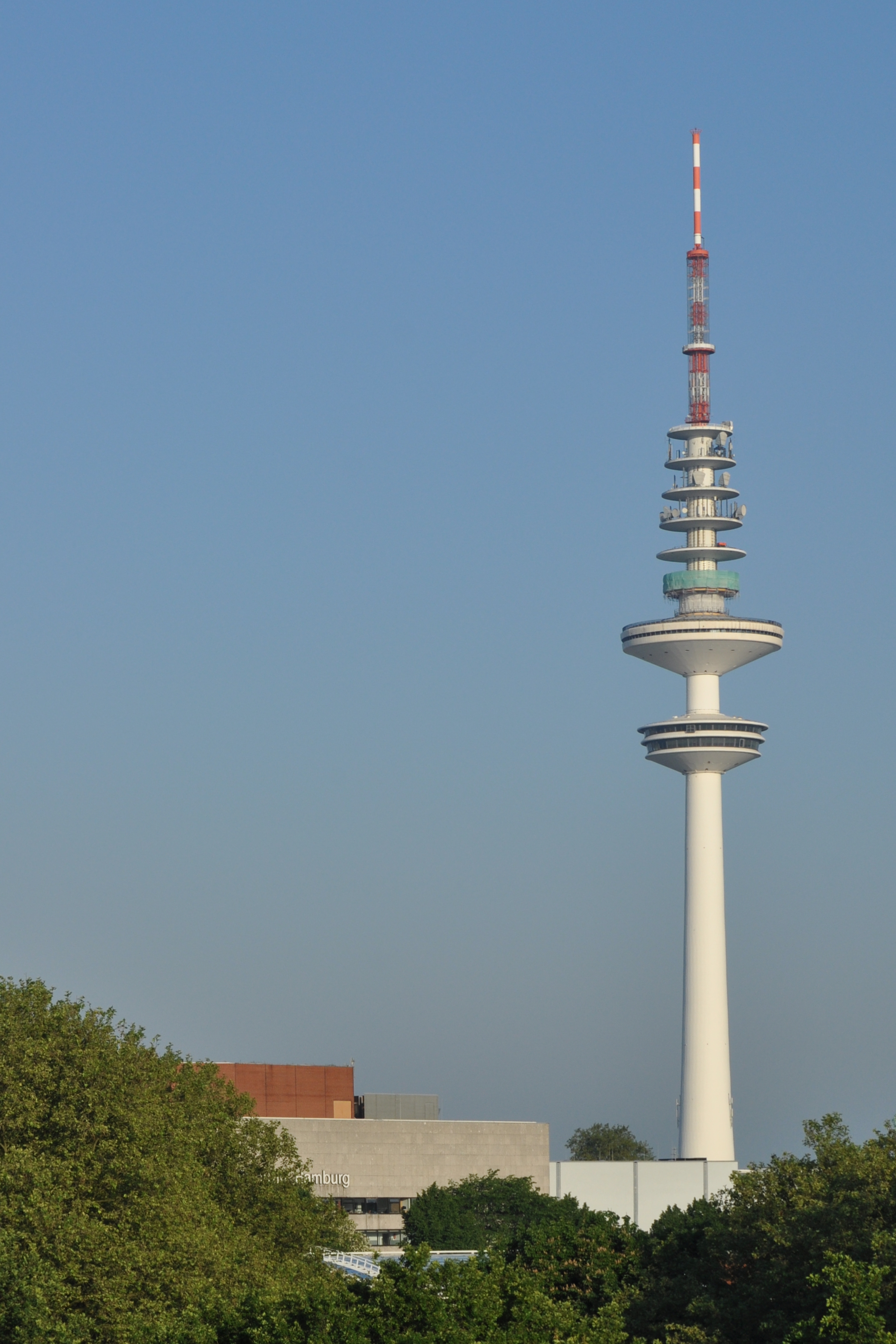
Heinrich hertz tower seen from Hamburg cathedral.

With an overall height of 279.2 m (916 ft) it is Hamburg's tallest structure, consisting of a 204 m (670 ft) steel-reinforced concrete lower section topped by a 45 m (148 ft) steel-lattice tower and a three-segmented cylinder of about 30 m (98 ft), which supports various antennas. There are eight concentric platforms stacked one above the other: starting at 128 m (420 ft) with the two-story observation (lower floor) and revolving restaurant (upper floor) platform, served by two high-speed elevators. Above that at 150 m (492 ft) is the operations platform housing the workforce and equipment, and further up six differentially sized, smaller open platforms in same distances, populated with high-gain directional microwave radio relay antennas ("parabolic mirrors"). Number nine was added at 25 m height in July 2005.

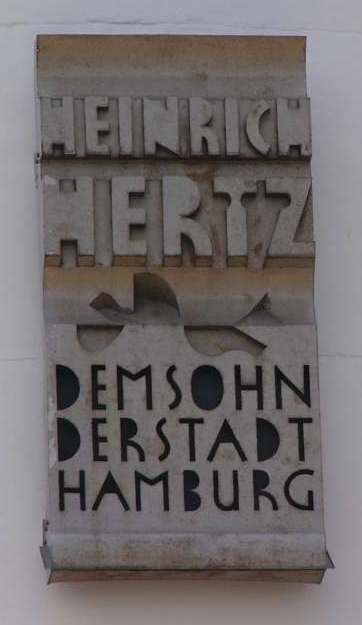
Memorial plaque

After the observation platform and restaurant were closed due to asbestos decontamination, former stuntman Jochen Schweizer had a bungee jumping base installed. The restaurant will not open again due to new fire escape regulations, and the bungee platform was closed at the end of 2001.

The tower has been home to the VFDB Hamburg section's radio amateur club station "DF0HHT". It also housed a DGPS transmitting station serving the city of Hamburg's Surveying Agency.

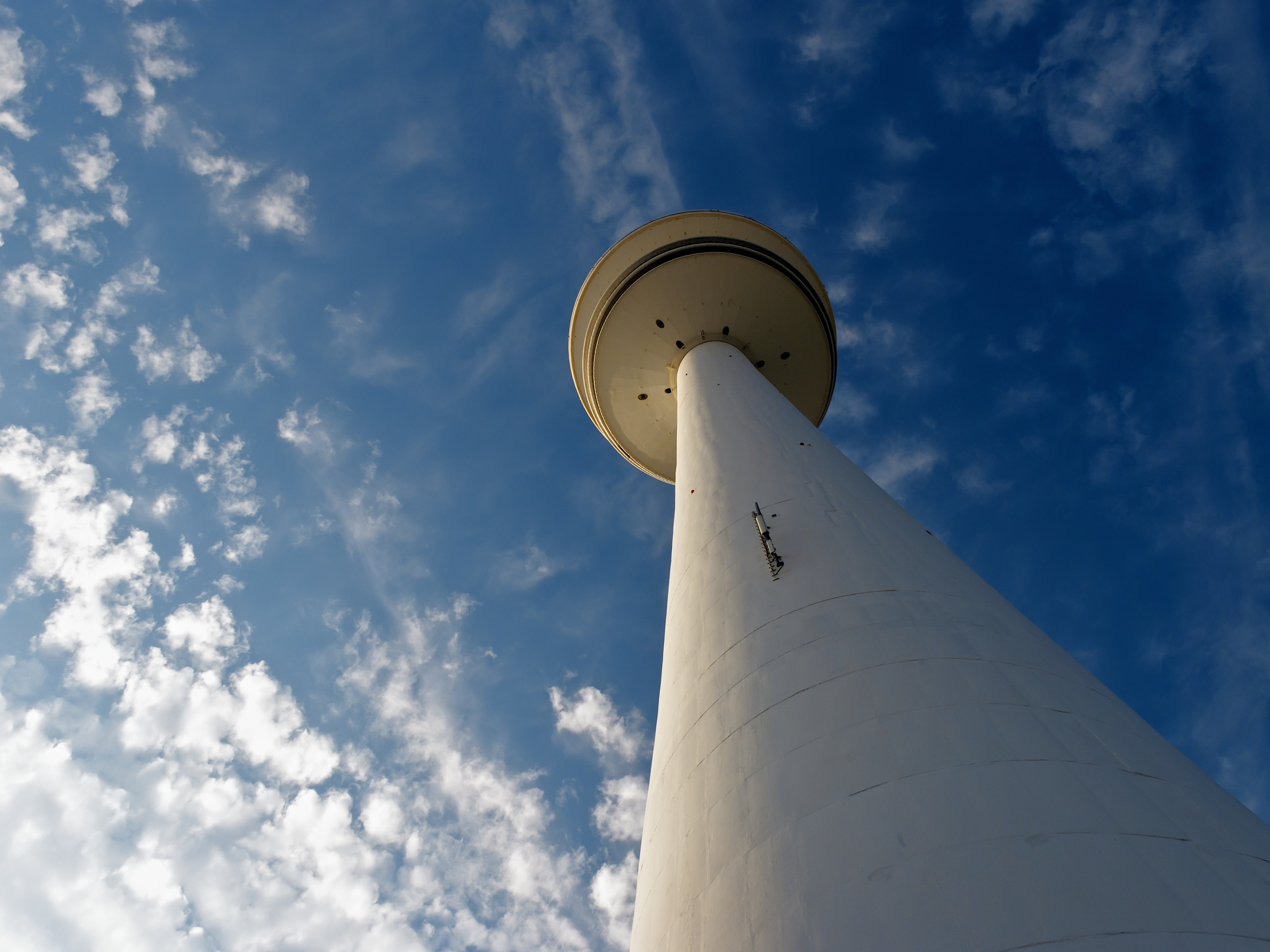
Heinrich hertz tower from ground level

The tower is named after the Hamburg-born German physicist Heinrich Hertz. A memorial plaque in his honour on the tower's wall reads: "Heinrich Hertz – Dem Sohn der Stadt Hamburg" ("Heinrich Hertz - to the Son of the City of Hamburg").

== See also ==
- List of towers
