= HafenCity =

- Quarter of Hamburg
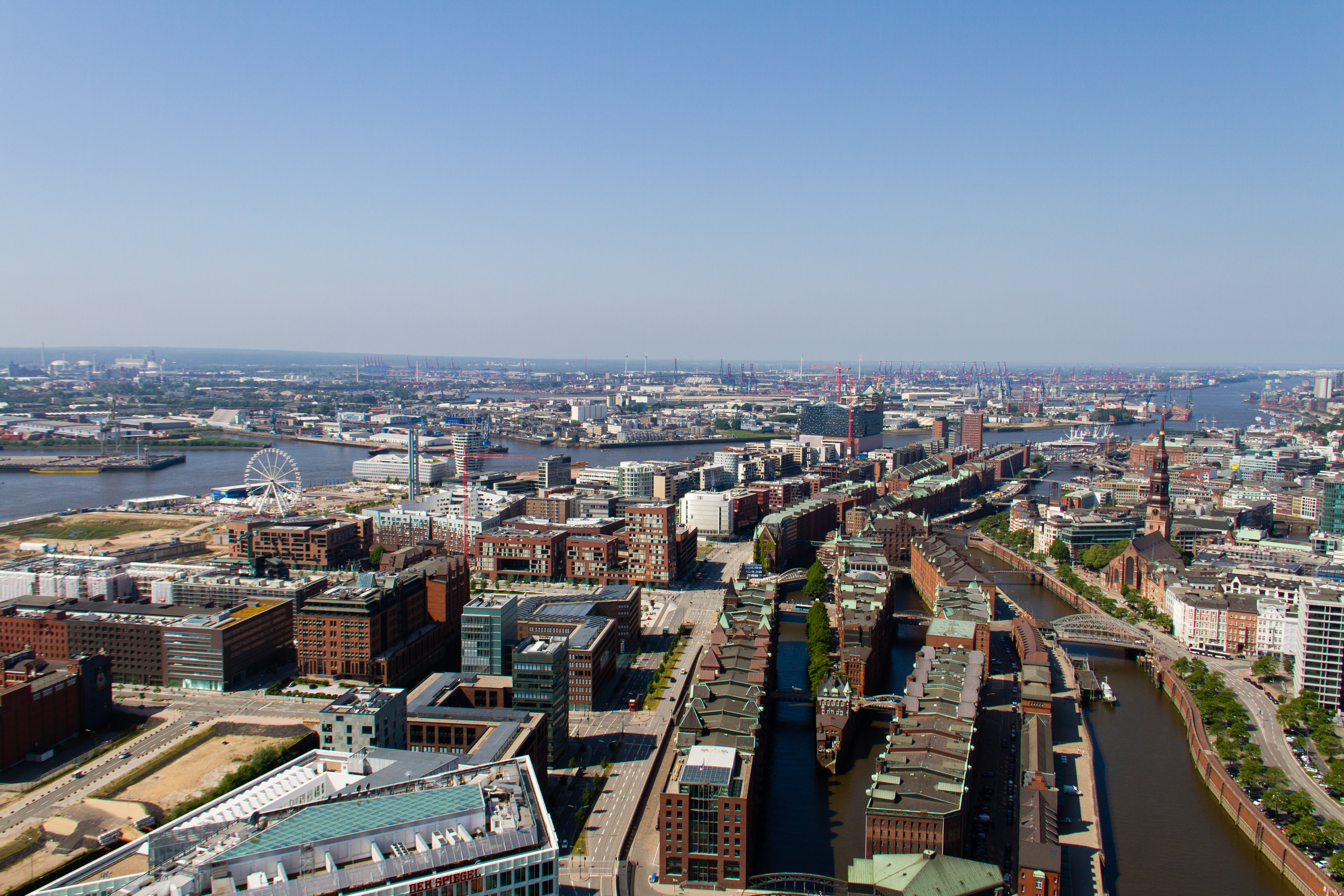
- Aerial view of western HafenCity and Speicherstadt (2013)

- Location of HafenCity in Hamburg
- Interactive map of HafenCity
- Location within Germany Location within Hamburg
- Coordinates: 53°32′30″N 9°59′36″E
- Country: Germany
- State: Hamburg
- City: Hamburg
- Borough: Hamburg-Mitte

Area
  - Total: 2.4 km^{2} (0.93 sq mi)
- Elevation: 8 m (26 ft)

Population (2024-12-31)
  - Total: 8,062
  - Density: 3,400/km^{2} (8,700/sq mi)
- Time zone: UTC+01:00 (CET)
  - Summer (DST): UTC+02:00 (CEST)
- Dialling codes: 040
- Vehicle registration: HH
- Website: www.hamburg.de

HafenCity (German pronunciation: [ˈhaːfn̩ˌsɪti]) is a quarter in the borough of Hamburg-Mitte, Hamburg, Germany. It is located on the Elbe river island Grasbrook, on the former Port of Hamburg area. It was formally established in 2008 and also includes the historical Speicherstadt area, which since 2015 is an UNESCO World Heritage Site with the adjacent Kontorhausviertel. The main landmark of the HafenCity is the Elbphilharmonie concert hall.

In a narrower sense, HafenCity Hamburg is a project of urban regeneration where the "greater Grasbrook" area of the former Hamburg free port is being revitalised with new hotels, shops, office buildings, and residential areas. The project is considered the largest urban redevelopment project in Europe by landmass, at approximately 2.2 square kilometres (220 ha). With the diminished economic importance of free ports in an era of European Union free trade, large container ships, and increased border security, the Hamburg free port was downsized, relieving the current HafenCity area of its restrictions. The ground-breaking ceremony was held on 20 June 2001, with the first quarter called "Am Dalmannkai/Sandtorkai", neighboring the Elbphilharmonie, completed in 2009.

When completely developed, the HafenCity area is projected to be home to about 12,000 people and the workplace of 40,000 people.

== Demarcation ==
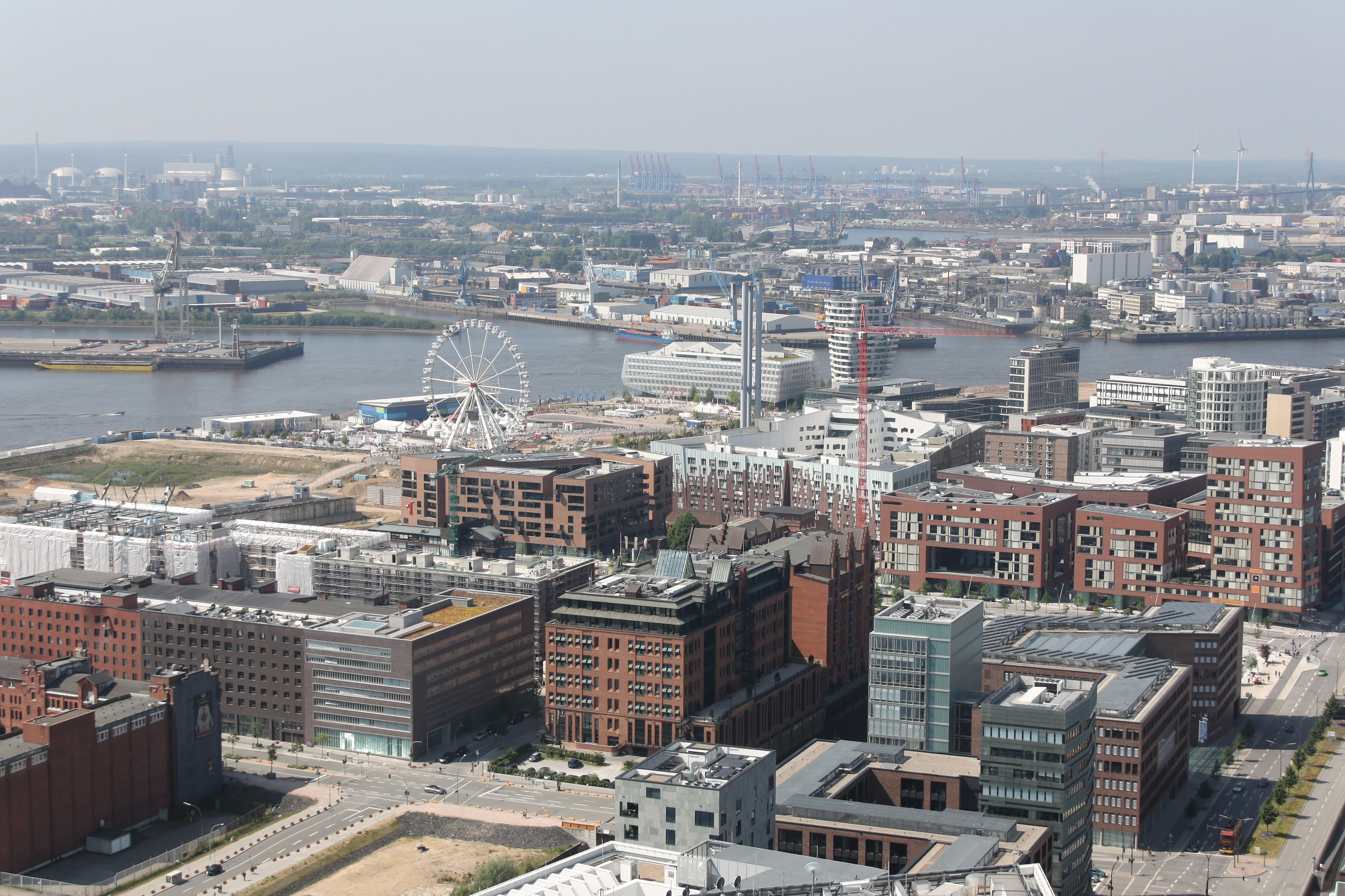
Überseequartier, one of the new quarters of HafenCity

On 1 March 2008, HafenCity was declared to be a separate district through the Law Concerning the Spatial Division of the Free and Hanseatic City of Hamburg (Gesetz über die räumliche Gliederung der Freien und Hansestadt Hamburg) - RäumGlG. It is composed of the former harbor of Großen Grasbrooks as well as the warehouse district on the islands of Kehrwieder and Wandrahm. Together, this borders the districts of Altstadt, Rothenburgsort, and the former district of Klostertor.

On 20 February 2007, a decree of the Senate established the exact border delineation of both parts of the new district. Just over four years earlier, on 1 January 2003, the area was removed from the duty-free zone of Hamburg to allow construction of housing and associated infrastructure.

=== Speicherstadt ===
Because of the new division, the Speicherstadt (Warehouse District) now belongs to the administrative region of the northern part of HafenCity instead of part of the Altstadt. However, the term HafenCity is primarily used to refer to the area of city development, whereas Speicherstadt is seen as a separate quarter.

== History ==
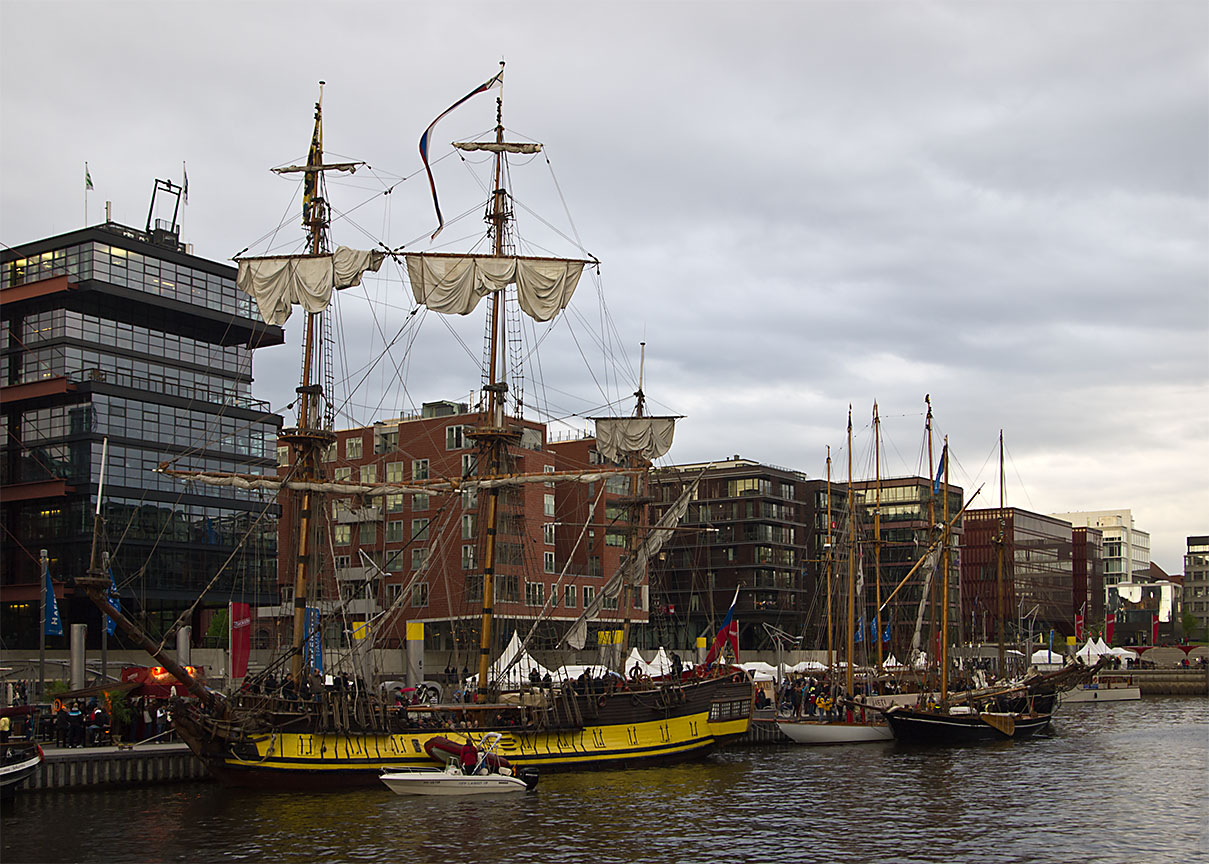
Tradition harbor at Sandtorkai

The land of the former island of Grasbrook, upon which the HafenCity is built, lay until the beginning of the 19th century outside of the city gates. The city fortifications used to run along what is now the street of Am Sandtorkai. The residential areas of Kehrwieder and Wandrahm were inside the walls, in the area of the current HafenCity. Outside the city walls, the boggy areas were used as meadows, and the western end of Große Grasbrook was used a place for executions, including those of pirates Klaus Störtebeker and the Victual Brothers. In the 18th and early 19th centuries, shipyards and port businesses operated here. In 1844, the first gasworks in Hamburg were built on the northern part of the island.

When the capacity of the Binnenhafen (de) and Niederhafen (de) ports became full at the end of the 19th century, the city walls were demolished and the area of Grasbrook was used to extend the harbor area. In 1868, the first artificial dock was constructed at Sandtorhafen, and in 1881, the Grasbrookhafen was added. The Strandhafen was built directly on the Norderelbe, the Magdeburger Hafen, Brooktorhafen, and Ericusgraben were made to connect to the Oberhafen, and, finally, the Baakenhafen was built with a rail connection to the Hamburger Elbbrücken (de) bridges and the Kirchenpauerhafen with anchorage on the Elbe. Until 1886, the entire island was built up with docks and port installations.

In 1872, the Hamburg Hanover railway station (de) was constructed on Lohseplatz east of the Magdeburger Hafen. The Kehrwieder and Wandrahm residential quarters were demolished in 1883 to allow construction of the customs and duty-free zone of the Port of Hamburg, displacing around 20,000 residents. In 1888, the Warehouse District (Speicherstadt) could then be built in this area. Kaispeicher B was built in 1878 and the administration building of the old port authority (Altes Hafenamt) was built in 1885 at the Magdeburger Hafen. Around the start of the 20th century, the first heated fruit storehouses were constructed, and in 1928, a refrigerated herring warehouse designed by Fritz Schumacher was built.

== Culture and education ==
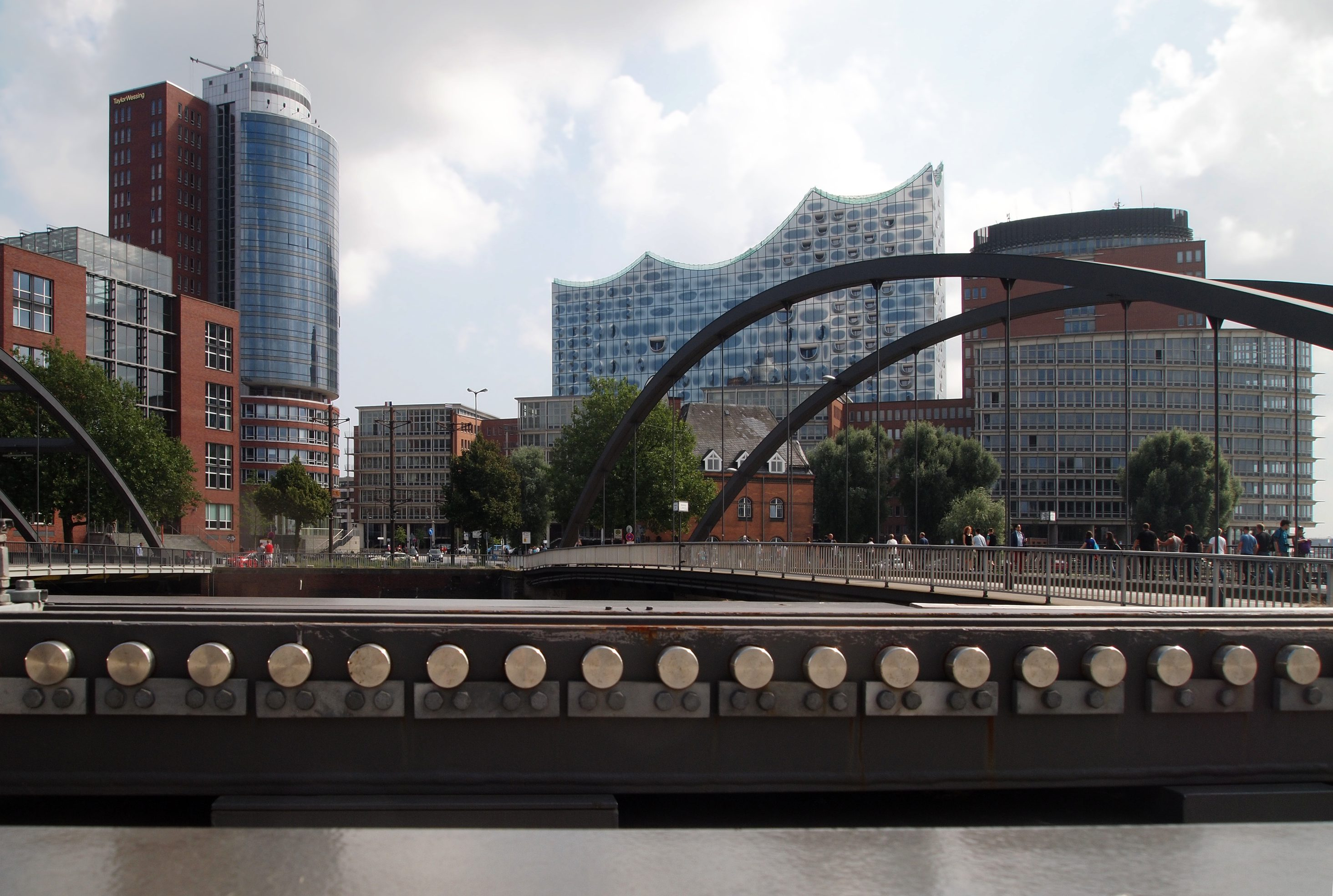
High-rises of the Hanseatic Trade Center around the Kehrwiederspitze; Elbphilharmonie visible in the background

The city of Hamburg built the Elbphilharmonie, a new concert hall on top of an old warehouse, as HafenCity's centerpiece. It is a new landmark for the city, but has been plagued by vast cost overruns and its construction was completed six years behind schedule. It was opened on 11 January 2017.

The area is served by the Katharinenschule, an elementary school. It is also the home of HafenCity University, a new school focusing on architecture and urban planning.

== Politics ==
These are the results of HafenCity in the Hamburg state election:

State Election	SPD	Greens	CDU	Left	AfD	FDP	Others
2025	28,5 %	23,2 %	22,4 %	8,9 %	5,0 %	4,9 %	7,1 %
2020	32,3 %	28,1 %	13,4 %	5,6 %	3,8 %	11,6 %	5,2 %
2015	43,4 %	9,9 %	15,5 %	4,6 %	4,1 %	20,6 %	1,9 %
2011	39,7 %	12,0 %	27,1 %	1,1 %	–	16,0 %	4,1 %
2008	15,7 %	12,2 %	61,6 %	0,4 %	–	9,8 %	0,3 %

== Economy ==
The area is currently home to the German headquarters of Kühne & Nagel, an international shipping conglomerate, the Spiegel Group's new headquarters on the Ericusspitze, and Unilever. Greenpeace opened its new headquarters in Hafencity in 2011. The Hamburg-America Center opened its doors in 2009.

== Transport and Infrastructure ==
At Strandkai, cruise ships can berth at Hamburg Cruise Center HafenCity.

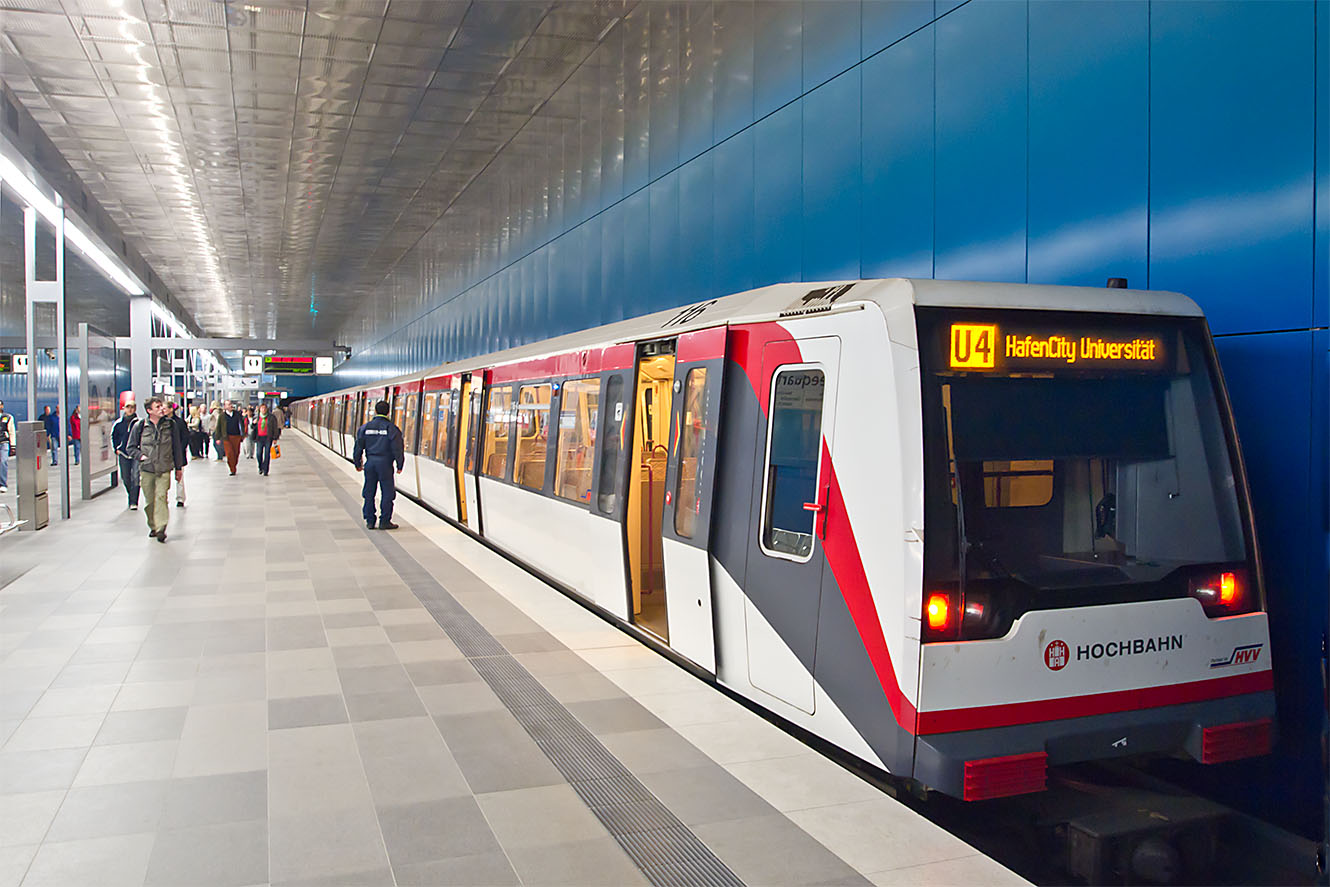
Metro station Überseequartier, line U4

The area is served by a newly constructed underground line, the U4, which was completed in 2012. The line features three new stations: Überseequartier, HafenCity Universität and Elbbrücken.

== Flood protection innovations ==
Because HafenCity is subject to periodic flooding from storm surges, using innovative flood protection technologies has been an important part of its redevelopment. The threat from flooding is even more grave due to the predicted effects of climate change.

While dikes were initially considered to shield the islands from storm surges, it would have been impossibly expensive and taken away from the view. Instead, there are strict flood-protection rules in places within the special development zone, such as requiring new roads and public spaces to be built on sand terraces over 25 feet (7.6 m) above the normal high-tide line.

Buildings along the shore remain at their original level but must be waterproofed up to the elevated-road level. In addition, shore-adjacent buildings are required to have an entryway allowing access to the 25-foot (7.6 m)-high road level so that they remain accessible during times of flooding. Although the design has been expensive, it has been recognized as one of the more innovative flood protection measures in use today.

== Construction work and work accidents ==
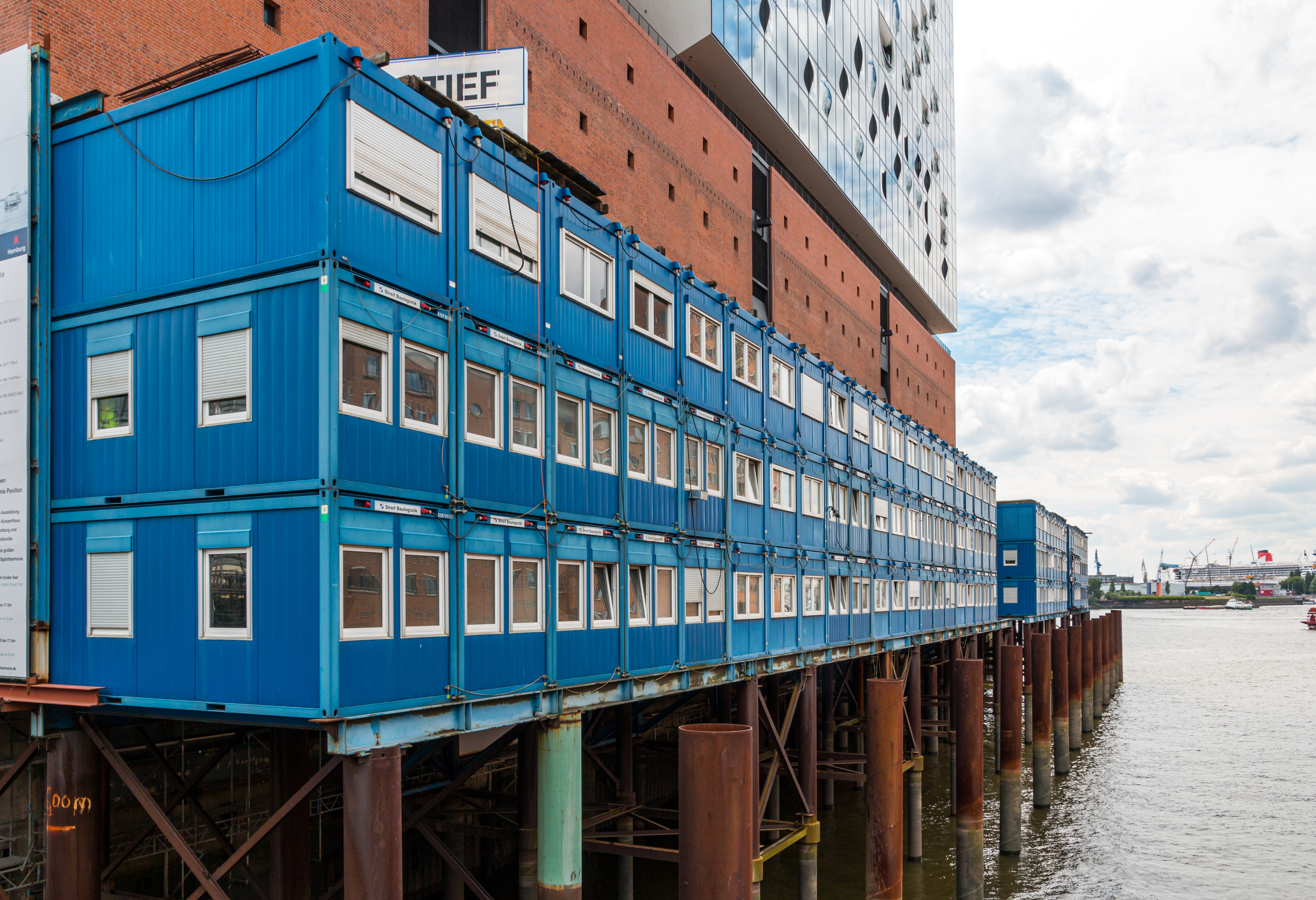
Containers beneath Elbphilharmonie in 2016

To build Hafencity, over 1,000 people have been working on various construction sites since 2016. Many construction companies use subcontractors for individual construction phases. Many workers come from Southeast and Eastern Europe.

Since construction, there have been several serious accidents on the construction sites. The most serious occurred in October 2023. When scaffolding extending over eight floors collapsed on October 30, 2023 in the Überseequartier (Unibail-Rodamco-Westfield), five people died.

== See also ==
- Port of Hamburg
- Internationales Maritimes Museum Hamburg

== Bibliography ==
- Act of the areal organisation, 6 July 2006. Gesetz über die räumliche Gliederung der Freien und Hansestadt Hamburg (RäumGlG) (in German).
