= Franz Andreas Meyer =

German civil engineer

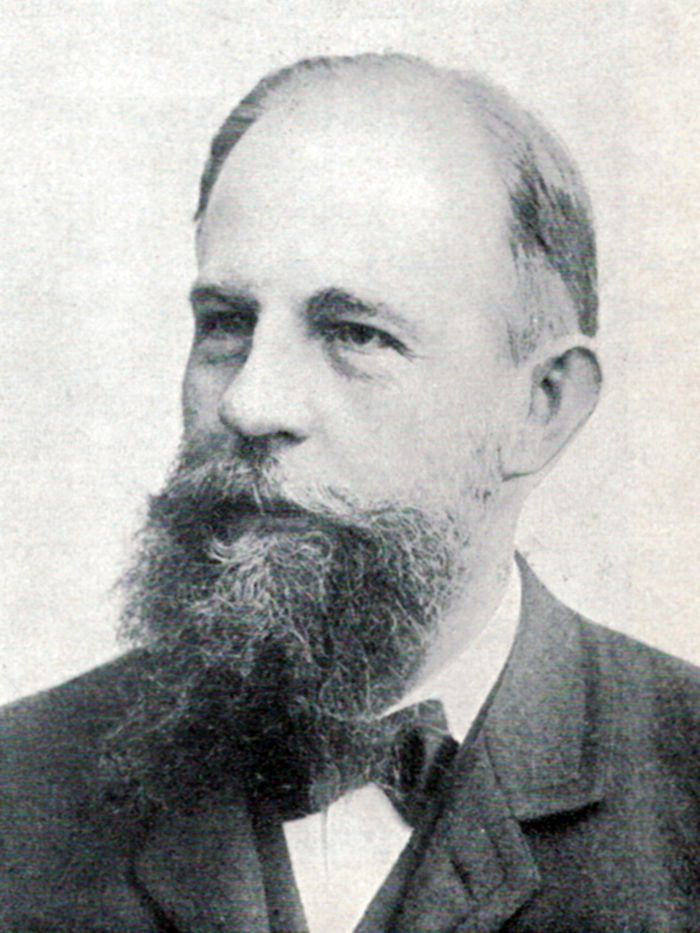
Franz Andreas Meyer (date unknown)

Franz Ferdinand Carl Andreas Meyer (6 December 1837, Hamburg - 17 March 1901, Bad Wildungen) was a German civil engineer, known primarily as the creator of the Speicherstadt on Hamburg's waterfront.

== Biography ==
He was born to Ferdinand Wilhelm Meyer (1800–1862), a merchant who had to abandon his business in 1851, due to financial difficulties. After attending the private boys' school operated by Elise Averdieck, he switched to the Gelehrtenschule des Johanneums. He left there in 1854 to enroll at the Technical University of Hanover. There, he studied with Conrad Wilhelm Hase and became a lifelong adherent of the Hanover school of architecture. After completing his studies, in 1858, he worked for Hase for a year, then joined the Royal Hanoverian State Railways, where he participated in building the Bremen to Bremerhaven line.

He returned to Hamburg in 1862 and found employment with the Port Authority. Three years later, he appointed the Technical Manager, under the Director of hydraulic engineering, Johannes Dalmann. When the position of District Engineer became vacant in 1868, he moved to the city Building Department. That same year, he married Antonie Mathilde Goßler (1848–1920), a niece of Senator Hermann Goßler. Upon the retirement of Christian Wilhelm Plath (1820–1894) in 1872, he was named Chief Engineer, a position he held until his death.

When plans for the Speicherstadt were nearing completion in 1883, he became chief planner and designer for the project. He also became an advisor to the Hamburger Freihafen-Lagerhaus-Gesellschaft, which was charged with operating the warehouses. He hired several architects, including Wilhelm Emil Meerwein, Bernhard Georg Hanssen, Hugo Stammann and Gustav Zinnow, to produce the detailed specifications. In addition to the Speicherstadt, he personally designed a number of bridges. He also engineered the Vierländerin-Brunnen (Four Nations Fountain), and took part in the renovation of Schloss Bergedorf.

Overall, however, his emphasis was on projects for improving public health, which included public baths and water filtration systems. Following the cholera epidemic of 1892, he was able to create drainage and sewage systems that had been proposed by William Lindley in the late 1850s, but rejected by the Hamburg Parliament. He also planned most of Hamburg's inner city parks, and was involved in planning the Ohlsdorf Cemetery. By 1896, he had prepared a general development plan for railways, canals, parks, and other public spaces. He was also sought after as a consultant for projects outside of Hamburg; advising the city of Strasbourg on its proposed expansion in 1878 as well as assisting the city of Kiel with construction related to the opening of the Kiel Canal.

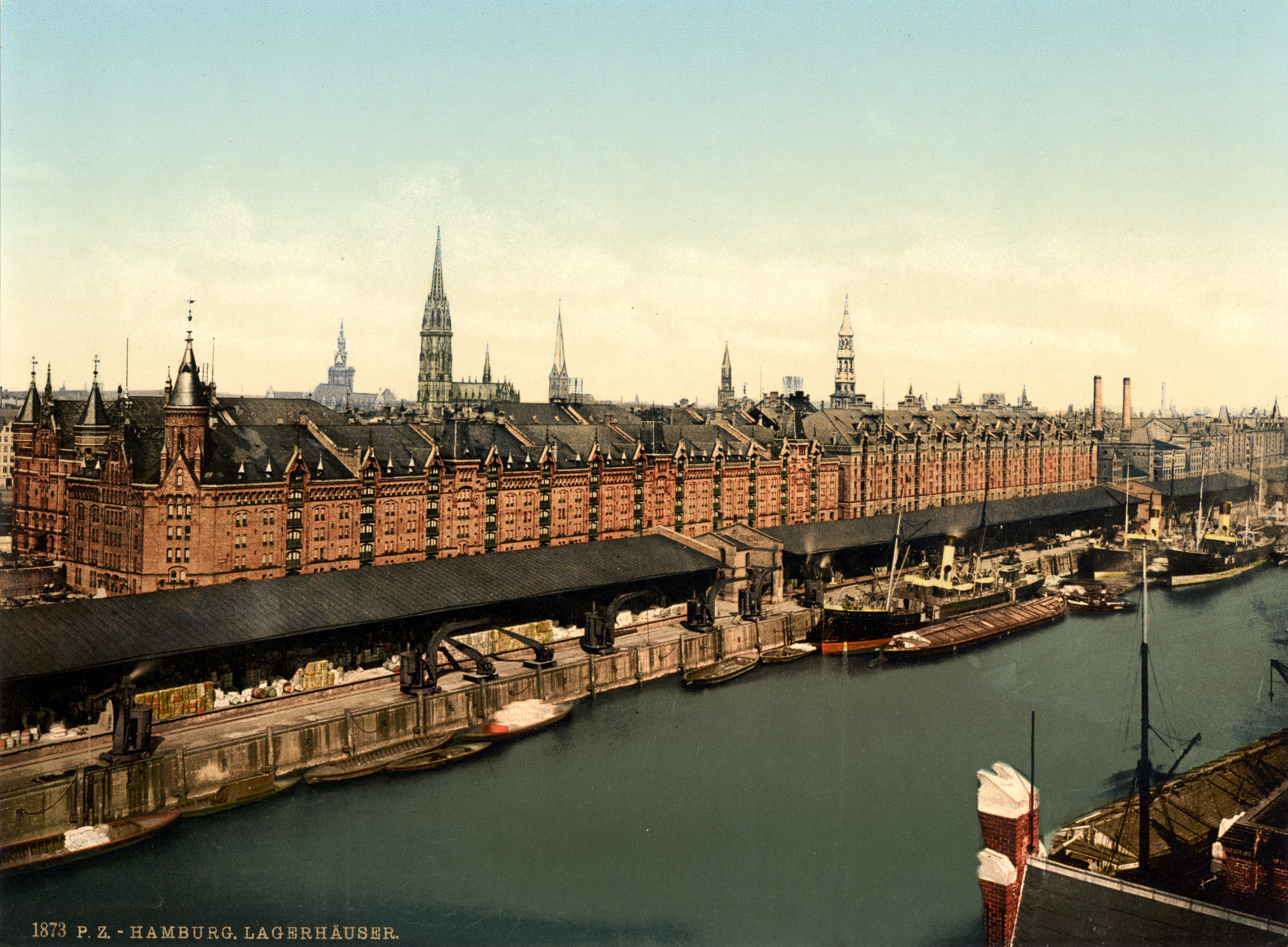
The Speicherstadt in 1895

His health worsened in his later years, and he died while under treatment by his doctor at the spa in Bad Wildungen. A bridge and a street in Billbrook are named after him, as is a street in Winterhude.
