= Speicherstadtrathaus =

Building in Hamburg, Germany

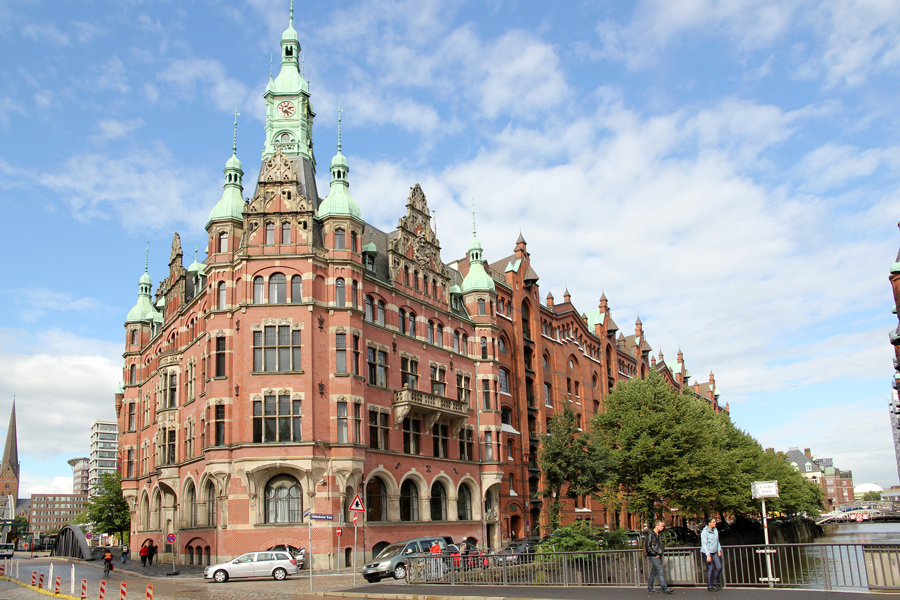
- Main façade of the Speicherstadtrathaus
- Interactive map of the Speicherstadtrathaus area

General information
- Architectural style: Gothic-Baroque-revival
- Location: Bei St Anne 1, Hamburg, Germany
- Coordinates: 53°32′42″N 9°59′52″E
- Construction started: 1902
- Completed: 1904

Design and construction
- Architects: Johannes Grotjan, Bernhard Georg Hanssen, Wilhelm Emil Meerwein

The Speicherstadtrathaus (English: Warehouse City Town Hall) is the administration building of Hamburger Hafen und Logistik AG. It is located in the historic warehouse complex of the Speicherstadt in the Port of Hamburg, Hamburg, Germany. The Speicherstadtrathaus has been a listed building since 1991 and has been on the UNESCO World Heritage List since July 5, 2015, along with the neighboring Kontorhaus District.

== Construction ==
The building was erected on 463 oak piles as part of the third construction phase during the construction of the Speicherstadt, which lasted from 1899 and 1912 on the former island of Wandrahm, in the street Bei St. Annen 1, as part of the U block of warehouses. The construction of the building itself took place between 1902-04. The architects were Johannes Grotjan, municipal architect in charge of the construction of the town halls for the various city districts, with Bernhard Georg Hanssen and Wilhelm Emil Meerwein of the local Hamburg firm Hanssen & Meerwein, who designed much of the warehouses in the district. The building's inauguration took place on June 1, 1904. The building was planned for the Hamburger Freihafen-Lagerhaus-Gesellschaft (HFLG), today called Hamburger Hafen und Logistik AG (HHLA), as the head office and was the successor to the headquarters building at Sandtorkai 1, which itself was inaugurated in 1887 and had since become too small. That building had also been built by Hanssen & Meerwein.

== Description and Significance ==
Hanssen & Meerwein and Grotjan were not only involved in the management building, the predecessor building, but also in the construction of the Hamburg City Hall (for the entire municipality). The naming of the Speicherstadtrathaus reflects the importance of HFLG for the Speicherstadt. But there are also similarities with the Hamburg City Hall in the architecture. The bell tower above the corner dominates the surrounding buildings and the façade has an eclectic collection of architectural elements. Romanesque round arches and Renaissance windows were combined with baroque decorative elements. In addition, the facade, made of Saxon brick, is accented with strips of gray Oberkirchen sandstone. The coat of arms of the HFLG can be seen on the heavily decorated gable. The tower helmets are shod with copper. The construction of the building cost 600,000 Reichsmarks and took two years to complete.

The interiors were furnished in a Jugendstil (Art Nouveau style). The curved forms of Jugendstil can be found on the tiles, the doors and the wooden panels. In addition, the rooms were lined with black slate slabs with embedded fossils.

The building was, surprisingly, not damaged during World War II and was completely renovated for its centennial in 2002. The work was managed by the architects' office Gmp Architekten von Gerkan, Marg and Partners. In addition to preserving the historic architecture, the building was modernized for the 21st century. New meeting rooms were created in the foyer when the originally open atrium was closed off by a curved glass roof in 2001-02.
