= Johannes Grotjan =

German architect

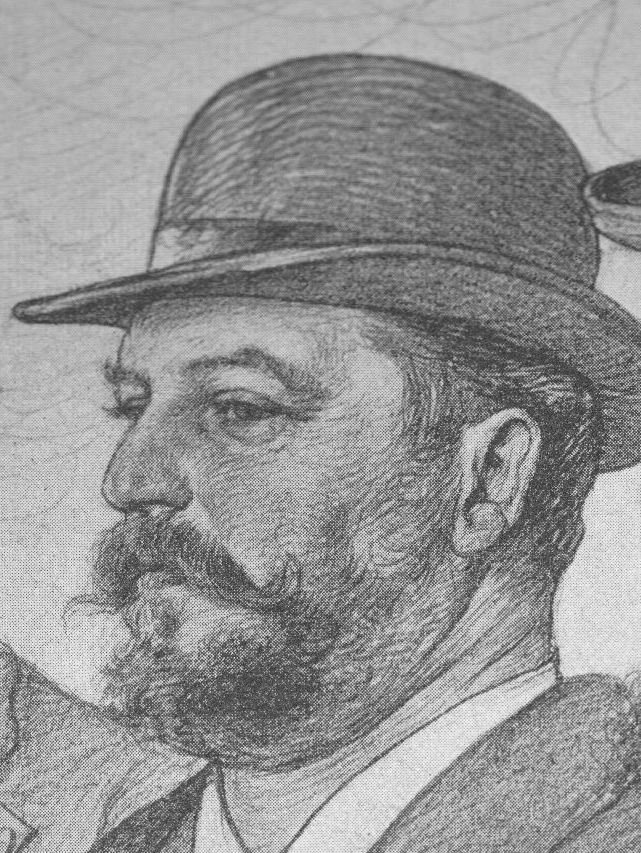
- Grotjan from a sketch of four of the architects of the Hamburg Rathaus
- Born: 18 October 1843; Hamburg, Free City of Hamburg, German Confederation
- Died: 5 October 1922 (aged 78); Hamburg, Germany
- Occupation: Architect
- Buildings: Hamburg City Hall; Speicherstadtrathaus; Colonnaden; Gebr. Hirschfeld store

Johannes Martin Friedrich Grotjan (18 October 1843, in Hamburg – 5 October 1922, in Hamburg) was a German architect. He was responsible for a large number of the municipal buildings constructed in Hamburg during the late nineteenth and early twentieth centuries, a period of great expansion and rise to global prominence for the city.

== Life and work ==
Johannes Grotjan was the son of the merchant Johann Georg Abraham Grotjan. He attended school and trained as a carpenter. From 1862 to 1864 he studied at the building trades school in de:Nienburg an der Weser and then worked as a journeyman carpenter. In 1865 he went to Munich to see de:Rudolf Gottgetreu, in whose studio he worked for two years. After that he returned to Hamburg. Here he worked for the construction company Johannes G. Minck and from 1868 for the Berlin-Hamburg Railway Company. As a graduate architect with practical experience in construction, Grotjan had completed what was then a common architectural training in Germany.

In 1871 Grotjan opened his own office in Hamburg as an independent architect. He planned single and multi-family houses, which quickly found favor with the upper bourgeoisie. Grotjan participated in the peripheral development of the commercial streets, particularly the Colonnaden (those covered by sidewalk arcades), and in other new buildings outside the city center. Since the city gates were not closed at the end of 1861, the Alster foreland was a sought-after residential area outside of Hamburg, where Grotjan planned many buildings. He built mainly in the Renaissance style with richly structured facades and balanced proportions. In doing so, he intended to give buildings representative features and place them in an appropriate historical context.

When the city government decided to rebuild Hamburg City Hall in the 1870s, Grotjan entered the 1876 architectural competition, ultimately receiving second prize. Since the construction project seemed too big, Grotjan redesigned the building together with his partner Henry Robertson, who died shortly afterwards, and seven other architects: Martin Haller, Bernhard Hanssen, Wilhelm Hauers, Leopold Lamprecht, Wilhelm Emil Meerwein, Hugo Stammann and Gustav Zinnow. In this group of architects the individual members had a contract with each other giving each one equal rights in all decisions made. Two internal competitions were held as part of the work: while Haller and Lamprecht drew up the floor plan, Grotjan designed the outer facade. He consciously chose stylistic devices of the Flemish Renaissance, which were intended to embody bourgeois self-confidence, important in a Northern European city with strong foreign trading and shipping connections. This group was finally awarded the contract for the new city hall, on which construction began in 1886 but was not completed until 1897.

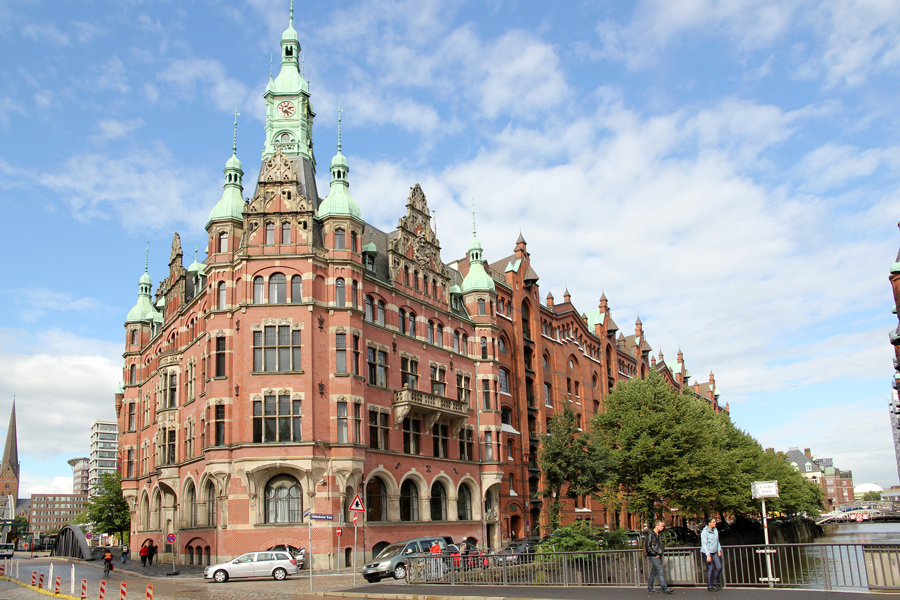
The Speicherstadtrathaus in Hamburg (1902–04) was one of Grotjan's most important commissions.

Grotjan partnered again with Hanssen and Meerwein in 1902 when they were selected to design the new headquarters of the Hamburger Freihafen-Lagerhaus-Gesellschaft (HFLG), the company that managed the free port area of Hamburg with its bevy of huge brick warehouses. This building, known more commonly as the Speicherstadtrathaus ("Harbor City Town Hall") was completed in a similar Northern Baroque-Gothic-Renaissance style of red brick, adorned with motifs of seafaring in beige sandstone, and inaugurated on 1 June 1904.

In contrast to the historical motifs that he used for the town hall, Grotjan's office buildings and commercial structures for central Hamburg also constructed during this period feature modern and functional floor plans. These included the stock exchange building on Alter Wall (1895), the Neidlinger house (1886), and the fashion house Gebr. Hirschfeld (1906; modified by Franz Fahning in 1938) with modern skeleton constructions and historic facades.

Since construction activities came to an almost complete standstill during World War I, Grotjan received only a few orders during this time. He completed a few more, less extensive buildings and then went into retirement. His son, who studied architecture and was to continue his father's business, died during the First World War. His second wife, whom the architect survived by a year, died in 1921.

== Significant buildings ==
- 1877–78: Colonnaden 68/70, office building
- 1886–97: Hamburger Rathaus, together with Martin Haller, Bernhard Hanssen, Wilhelm Emil Meerwein, Wilhelm Hauers, Hugo Stammann, and Gustav Zinnow
- 1885: Neidlinger House, Admiralitätstraße 77, corner of Michaelisbrücke, Hamburg
- 1893: Wagenbau Factory, Neuer Pferdemarkt 27, Hamburg
- 1894–95: Börsenhaus, Alter Wall 32, Hamburg (with Puls & Richter)
- 1898–99: Messtorff'sche Villa at Wentorfer Straße 38, Bergedorf, 1925–27 built as the Rathaus Bergedorf
- 1902–04: Speicherstadtrathaus (HFLG-Hauptverwaltungsgebäude) in the Hamburger Speicherstadt (with Bernhard Hanssen)
- 1905–06: Fahning-Haus, Neuer Wall 19, Hamburg
- 1911–12: Jerusalem-Kirche and the Jerusalem-Krankenhaus in Hamburg-Eimsbüttel
