= Bernhard Hanssen =

Bernhard Hanssen may refer to:

- Cornelius Bernhard Hanssen (1864–1939), Norwegian teacher, shipowner and politician
- Bernhard Georg Hanssen (1844–1911), German architect and politician
