= Afghan Museum =

Museum in Hamburg, Germany

Afghan Museum Afghanisches Museum (in German)
- Location of the Afghan Museum in Hamburg Afghan Museum (Germany)
- Established: 1998
- Dissolved: December, 23rd 2011
- Location: Hamburg, Germany
- Coordinates: 53.543333°N 9.989444°E
- Type: Culture and cultural history
- Public transit access: Messberg
- Website: www.afghanisches-museum.de/ (no longer in service)

The Afghan Museum (German: Afghanisches Museum) was private museum of culture and cultural history of Afghanistan, situated in the historic and picturesque Speicherstadt (warehouse district) of Hamburg, Germany. The museum's mandate was to bring the authentic and traditional aspects of Afghan culture to life.

== History ==
This private museum was opened in March 1998 by lawyer and businessman Nek Mohamad Pirzad, his family and friends and was closed in December 2011

== Interior and contents ==
The artistic design for the museum was led by Mr. Hessan, an Afghan artist living in Germany. The museum housed displays how a cobbler repairs worn out shoes, tandoori bread is baked, a carpet-maker ties knots for a large Afghan carpet with the famous Elephantfoot pattern. Exhibitions displayed a look inside a tea house and a Turkmen tent called yurt, or under an Afghan veil (chadri). Reproductions of the great fortress of Bost, Qala-e-Bost, in Lashkar Gah, the big Buddhas of Bamyan, and the minaret of Jam are represented.

The store offered green tea flavoured with cardamom, roasted chick peas, raisins, mulberries, Afghan jewellery and clothes were sold.

== Visitors ==
The museum took part in the Long Night of Museums of Hamburg.

== See also ==
- Kabul Museum
- List of museums and cultural institutions in Hamburg
