= Internationales Maritimes Museum Hamburg =

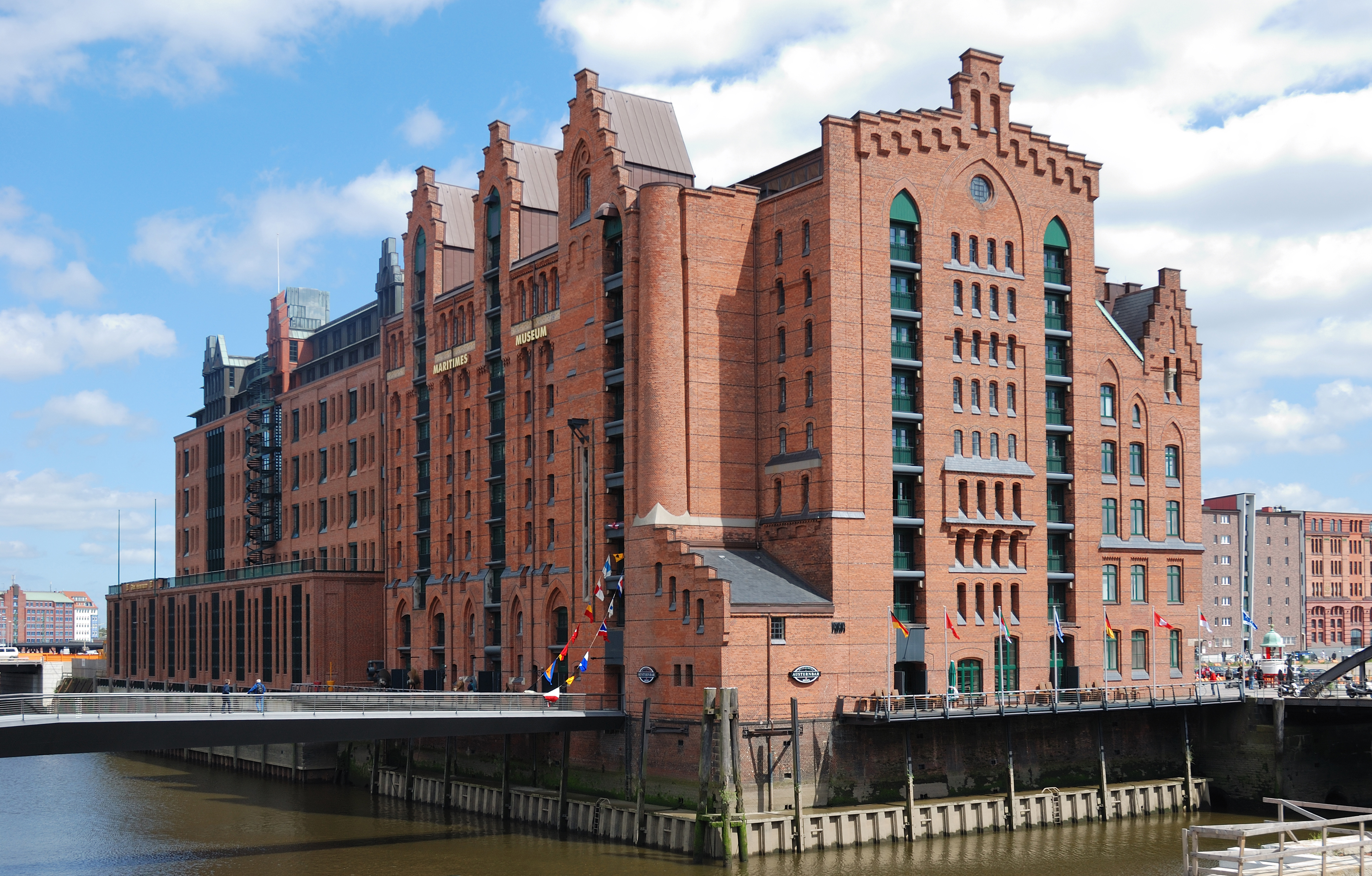
- Former warehouse, now the museum (2009)

- Location in Hamburg Internationales Maritimes Museum Hamburg (Germany)
- Established: 25 June 2008
- Location: Koreastraße 1; 20457 Hamburg, Germany
- Coordinates: 53.543344°N 10°E
- Type: transport museum
- Public transit access: Meßberg
- Website: Official website

The Internationales Maritimes Museum Hamburg (abbr. IMMH, International Maritime Museum) is a private museum in the HafenCity quarter of Hamburg, Germany. The museum houses Peter Tamm's collection of model ships, construction plans, uniforms, and maritime art, amounting to over 40,000 items and more than one million photographs. It opened in a former warehouse in 2008.

== History ==
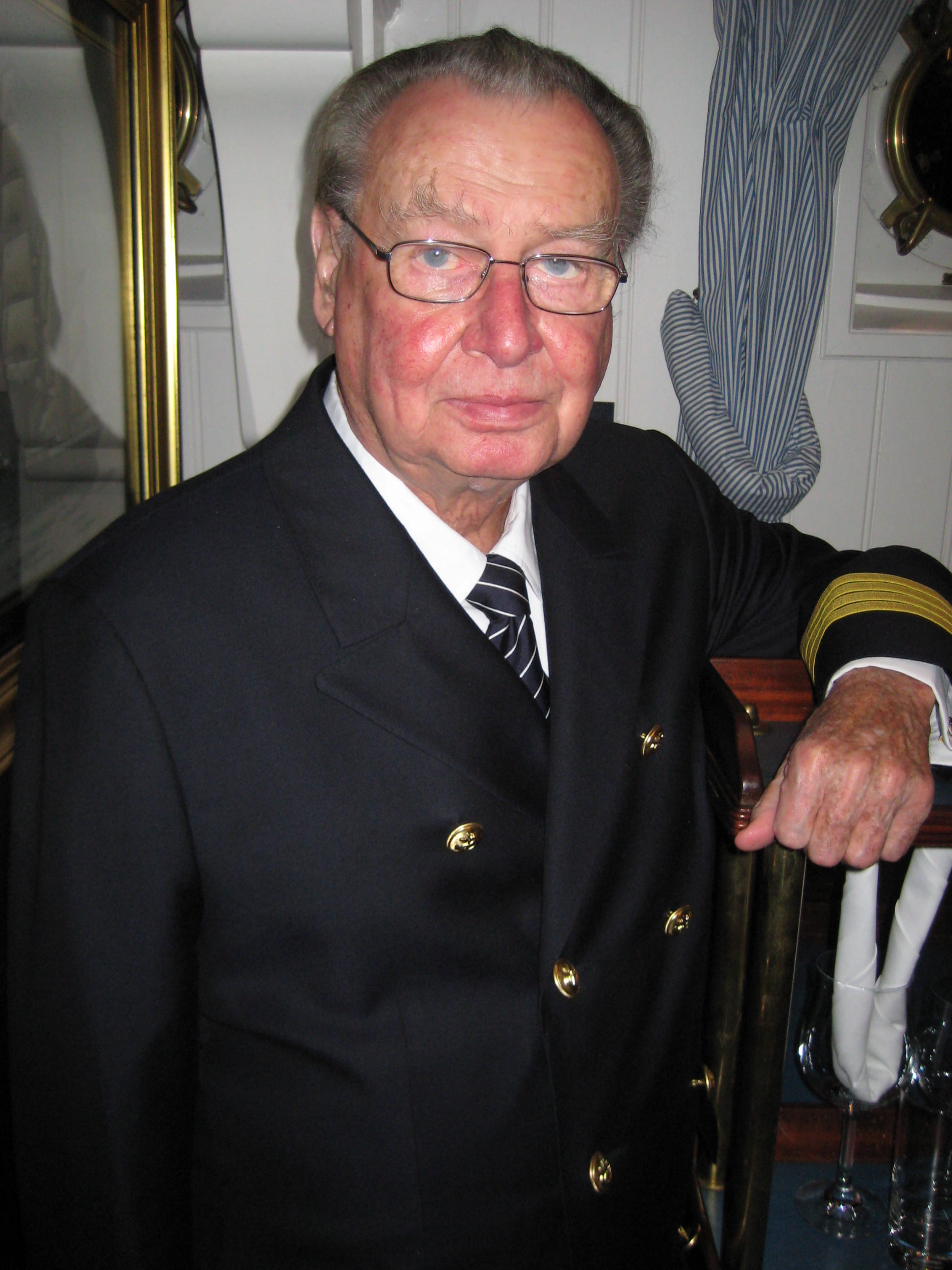
Peter Tamm

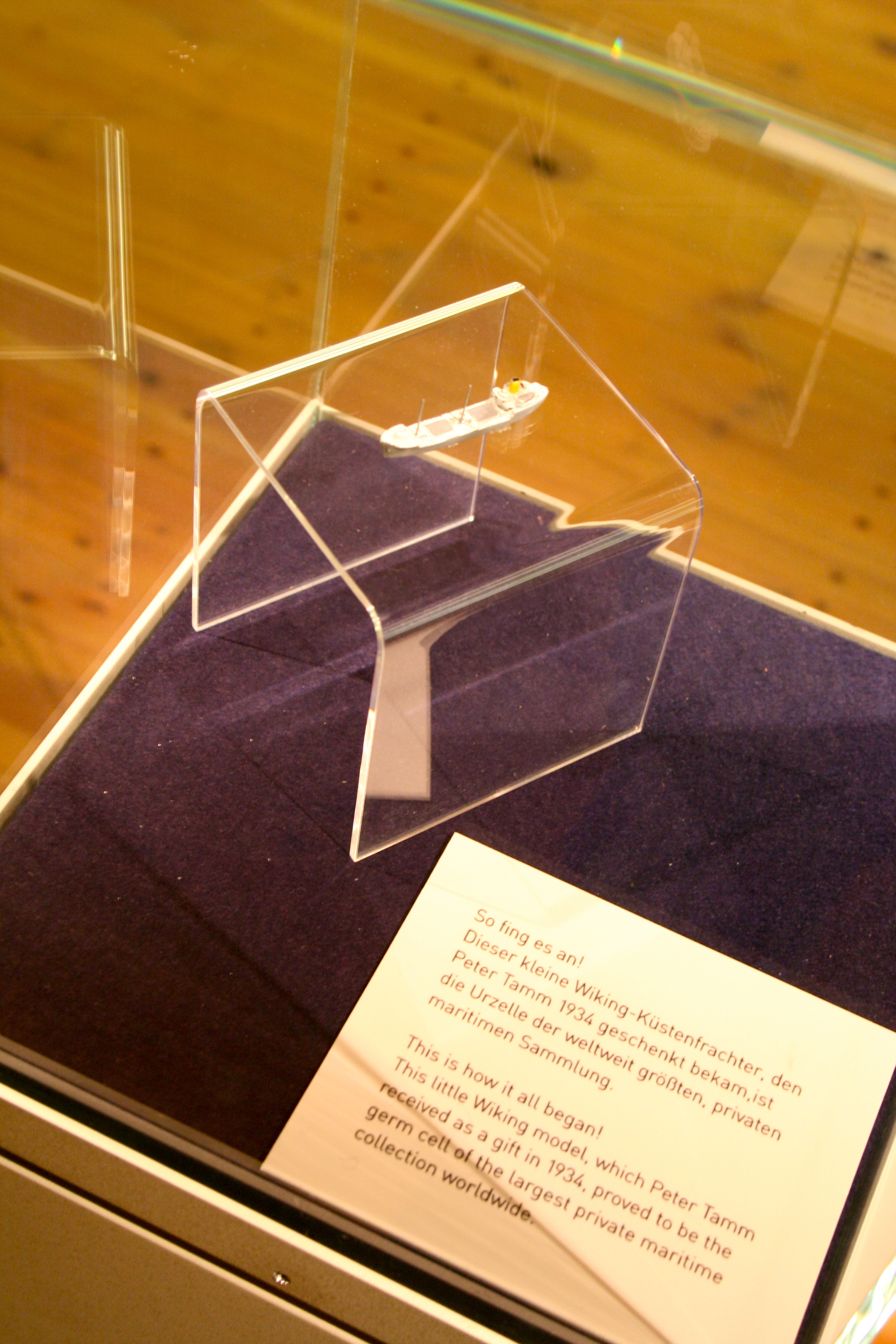
The first model ship

The private collection was started in 1934 by Peter Tamm—former chairman of the board of the Axel Springer AG—when Tamm was six years old. As Tamm retold the history, the initial event was when his mother presented him his first model ship. Prior to the opening in the HafenCity, the collection was called "Wissenschaftliches Institut für Schifffahrts- und Marinegeschichte" (Academic Institute of Shipping and Naval History) and located in a mansion at the Elbchaussee street and only open by appointment. In 2004 the Hamburg Parliament approved a grant for a new museum in the HafenCity quarter unanimously, with an abstention from voting by the GAL party parliamentary group. On 25 June 2008, the museum was opened by the German president Horst Köhler.

== Architecture ==
The Kaispeicher B (quay warehouse B) is the oldest preserved warehouse in Hamburg, built in 1878 and 1879 by the architects Bernhard Georg Hanssen and Wilhelm Emil Meerwein. It was built with a supporting structure of wood and steel columns, the outer walls of bricks also supporting the building. It was designed in neo-Gothic style. Constructed and used as a combination of a grain elevator and for ground storage for packaged goods. In 1890 the city of Hamburg bought the warehouse, which has been called Kaispeicher B ever since. In 2000 it was listed as a cultural heritage building but used as a warehouse for goods until the end of 2003. In 2008 the museum was opened after a period of renovation. Mirjana Marcovic (MRLV Architekten) planned the renovations and received an award from the Architekten- und Ingenieurverein Hamburg. The bridge crossing the Brocktorhafen—a steel construction of 80 t (79 long tons; 88 short tons) in the shape of a boomerang with a length of 60 m (200 ft)—by architect Dietmar Feichtinger (Paris) and WTM Engineers (Hamburg) also received an award in 2008.

== Interior and contents ==
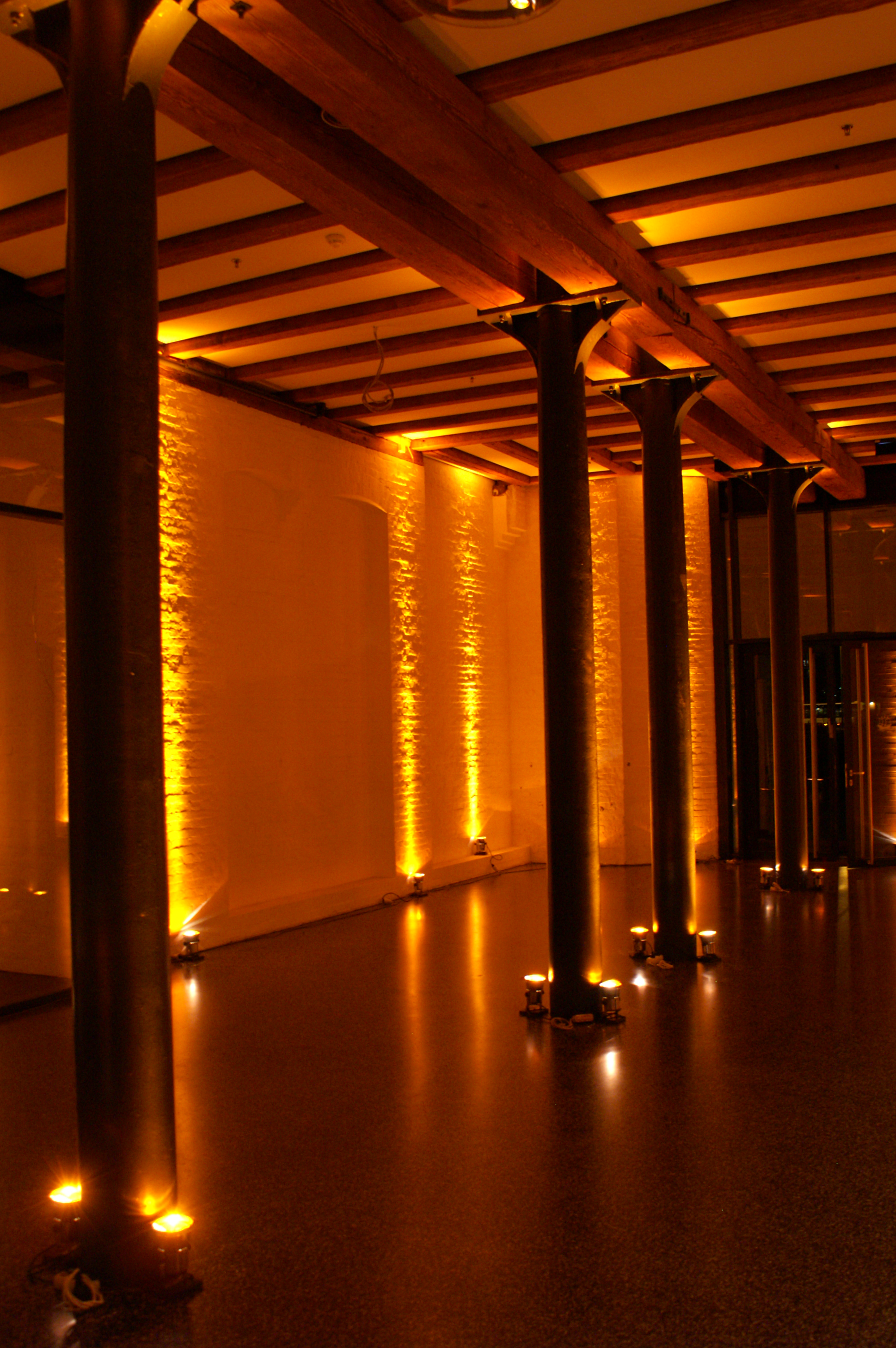
Renovated interior of the museum before the opening in 2008

The collection contains predominantly samples from the private collection of Peter Tamm and was severely criticised in the media for the lack of distance and historical awareness toward the German U-Boat war, the German sea war during World War II, and German colonial history. Some critics changed their opinion later.

The walkabout starts with a 3,000-year-old dugout, which was found in the Elbe river. Another exhibit is the baton of Großadmiral Karl Dönitz (1891–1945), displayed in an article about the Nuremberg Trials in the newspaper Berliner Zeitung of 1946. This article describes the sentences against the Nazi war criminals. The exhibition of the baton was often taken as an example of the lack of historical awareness about Nazi propaganda and the lack of distance toward Nazi symbolism, without challenging it. Further the exhibition consists of paintings with a naval or marine theme, model ships made of whale bones or ivory, weapons, uniforms, and decorations. Also the reproduction of the James Caird, the small lifeboat of Sir Ernest Shackleton's Imperial Trans-Antarctic Expedition, used by the German explorer Arved Fuchs in a relived journey in 2000, is displayed. The museum's archive also possesses 47 original letters of Lord Horatio Nelson, famous for his victory at the Battle of Trafalgar, and 15,000 cruise ship menus.

The collection shows more than 36,000 items on 12,000 m^{2} (130,000 sq ft).

- 10th floor: Cultural Forum "10th Longitude", special exhibitions
- 9th floor: The big world of ship models, water sports
- 8th floor: Maritime Art (art gallery and "treasure trove")
- 7th floor: marine research, energy and fisheries
- 6th floor: merchant shipping, cruise and ports
- 5th floor: navies of the world (from 1815 to present)
- 4th floor: life on naval vessels, ship's armament
- 3rd floor: The development of shipbuilding and engineering
- 2nd floor: sailing ships - from antiquity to the Hanse Sail, Cape Horniers and piracy
- 1st floor: explorers, navigation, communications and children's area
- Ground floor: foyer, reception area, restaurant and museum shop

In addition to the permanent exhibition, the museum also has presented several special shows including, for example, one about the Vikings.

== Gallery ==
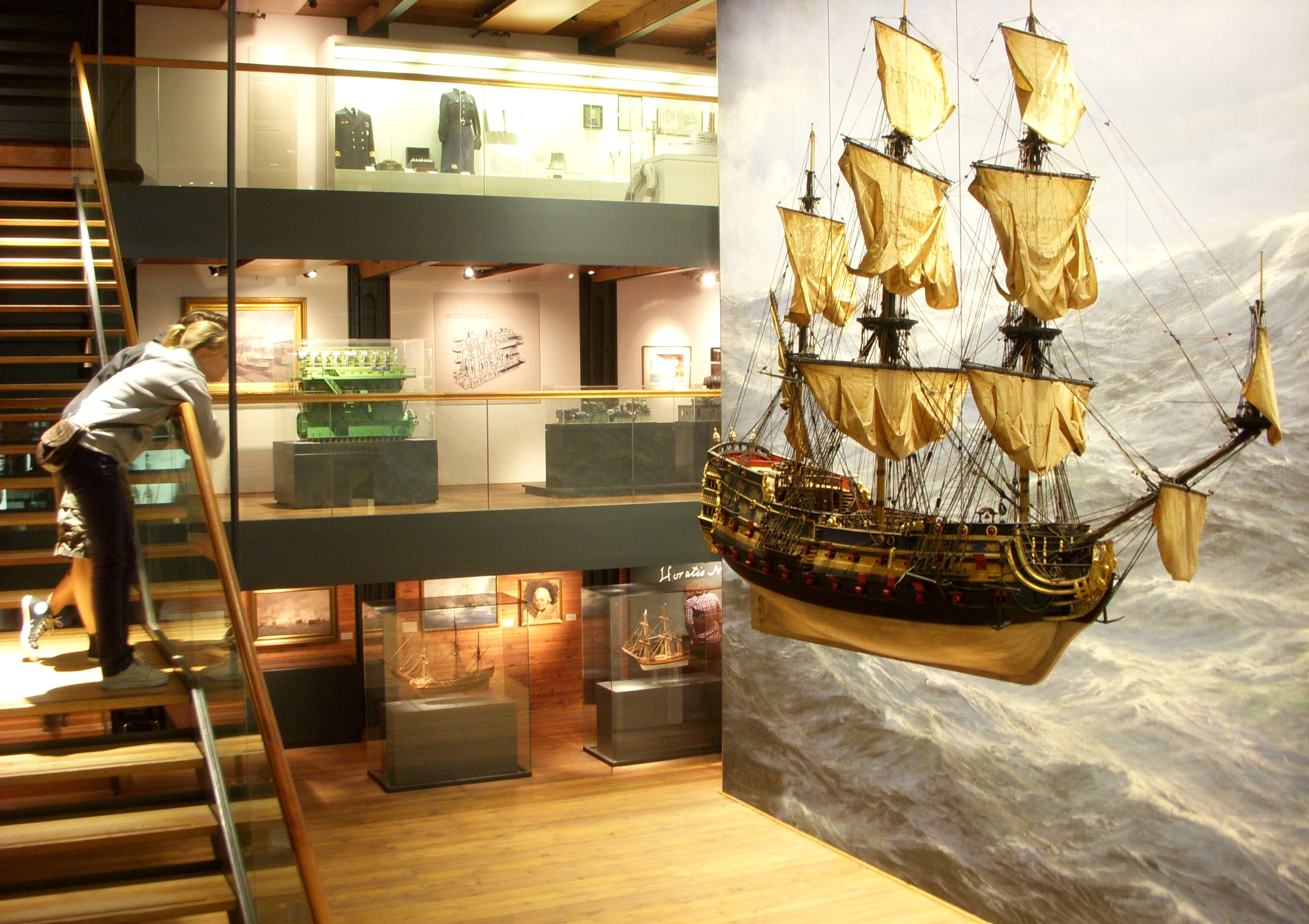

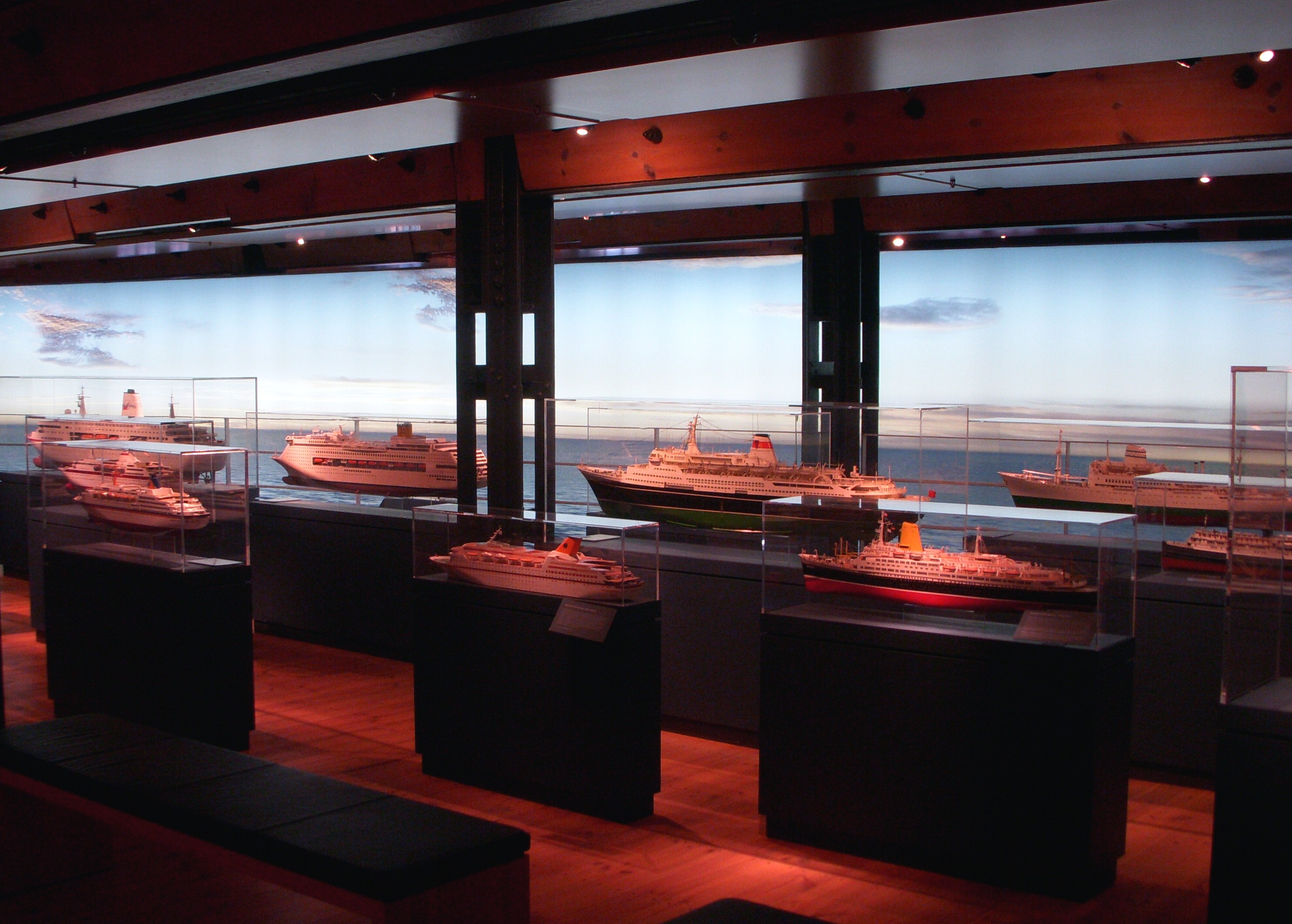

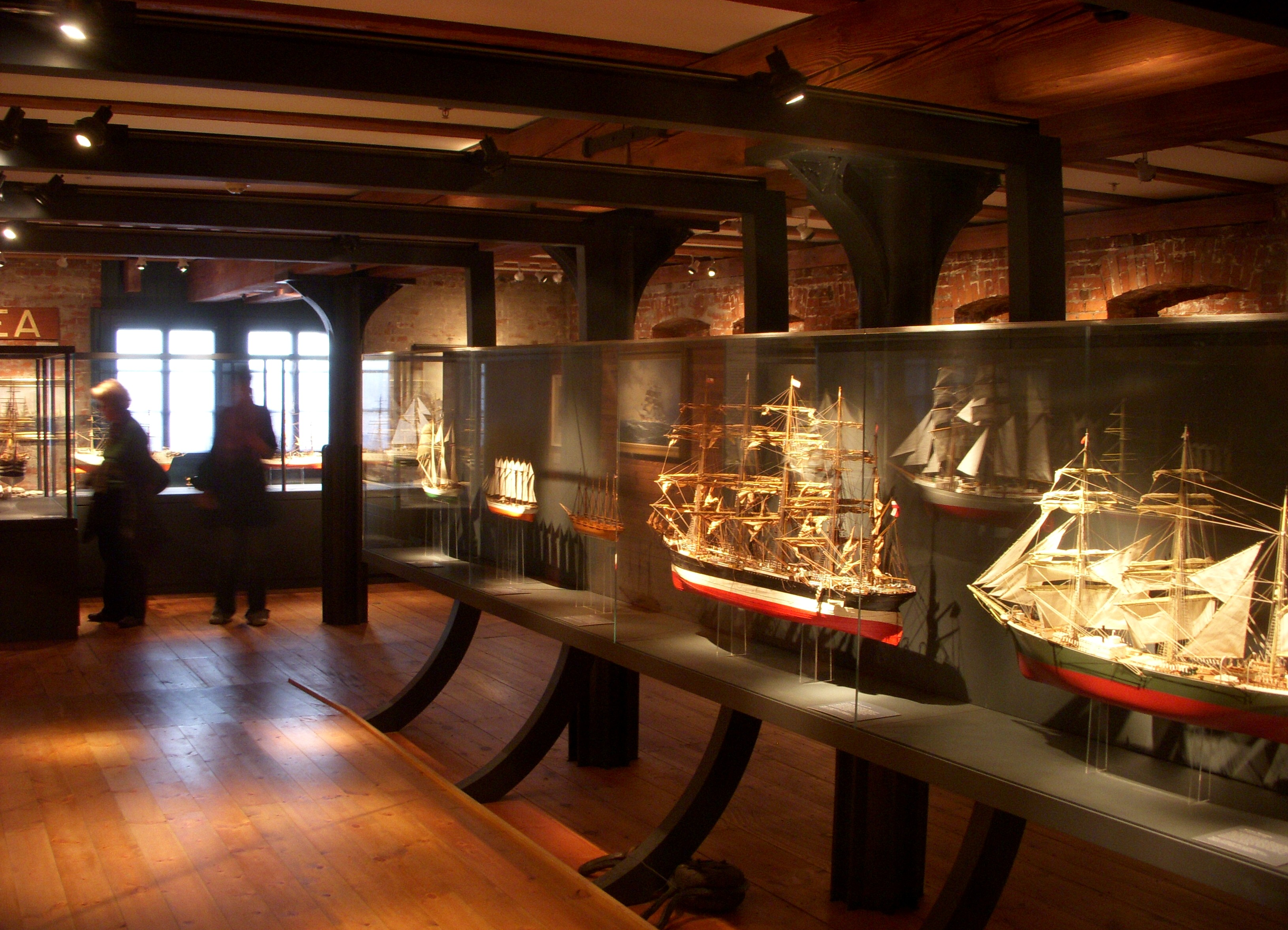

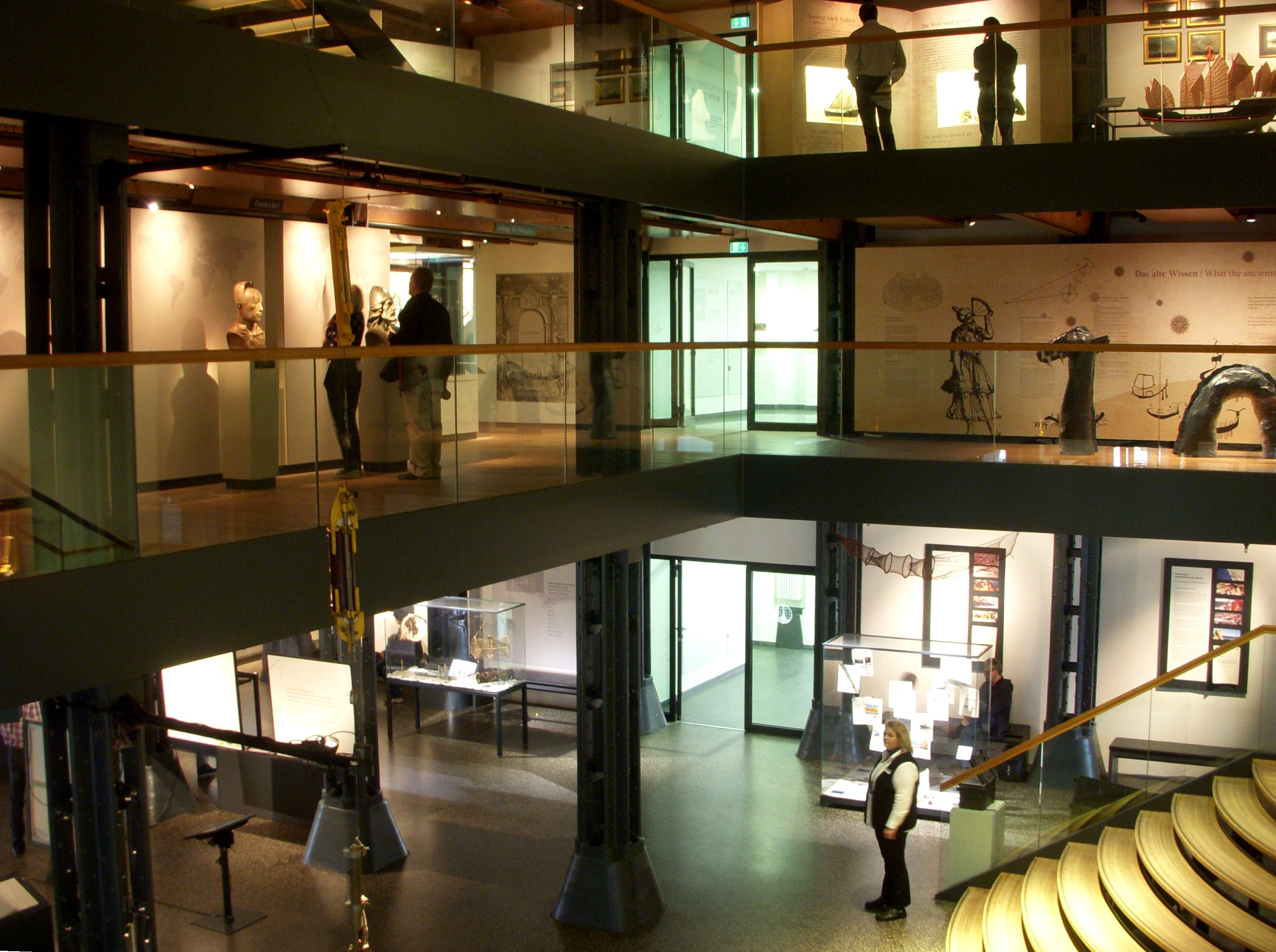

== Visitors ==
On 28 February 2009 the 100,000th visitor was counted. The museum's budget is calculated based on an estimate of 150,000 visitors per year.

In 2008 the museum participated for the first time in the Tag des offenen Denkmals, an annual, nationwide event sponsored by the Deutsche Stiftung Denkmalschutz, that opens cultural heritage sites to the public. It also takes part in the Long Night of Museums of Hamburg.

== Owners ==
The museum is owned by the foundation Peter Tamm Sen. Stiftung. The remodeling of the building was supported by a €30 million grant from the city of Hamburg.

== Location ==
The museum is located in the Speicherstadt (warehouse district) in the port of Hamburg. The building was given to the foundation by lease for free for 99 years by the senate of Hamburg.

== See also ==
- List of museums and cultural institutions in Hamburg
