= Peter Tamm =

German journalist (1928–2016)

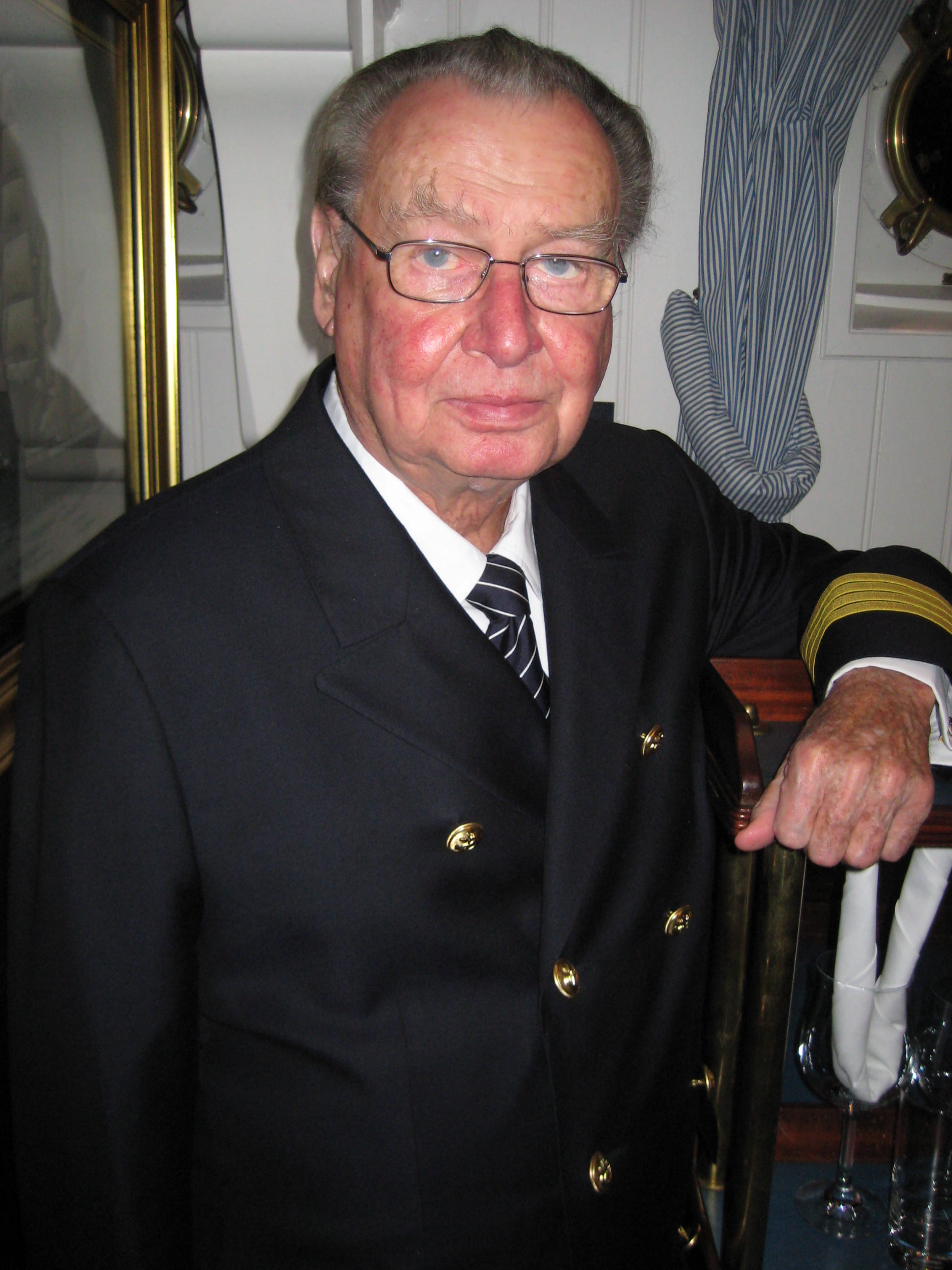
- Tamm on the Rickmer Rickmers in 2008
- Born: 12 May 1928
- Died: 29 December 2016 (aged 88)
- Occupation: Journalist

Peter Tamm (12 May 1928 – 29 December 2016) was a German journalist and collector. His collection formed the basis for the founding of Hamburg's International Maritime Museum in 2008.

== Early life ==
Tamm attended Gymnasium Eppendorf.

== Career ==
Tamm began his career as an editor for naval themes at the Hamburger Abendblatt newspaper in 1948. From 1970 to 1991, Tamm was chairperson of the board at the Axel Springer AG.

He collected militaria and model ships, among other things. From his collection, he founded the Wissenschaftliches Institut für Schifffahrts- und Marinegeschichte (Academic Institute for Shipping and Naval History) and later the Peter Tamm Sen. Stiftung foundation, which is the owner of the Internationales Maritimes Museum Hamburg.

Peter Tamm was criticised for his handling of Nazi symbolism. Some critics, like the German actor Rolf Becker, changed their opinions later. He died on 29 December 2016, aged 88.

== Works ==
- Tamm, Peter (2007). Selbsthilfe als Politik : eine explorative Studie zur qualitativen Bestimmung politischen Handelns im gesellschaftlichen Sektor kooperativer Selbsthilfetätigkeiten (in German). Munic: Hampp. ISBN 978-3-86618-182-3.
- Bracker, Jörgen; North, Michael; Tamm, Peter (1980). Maler der See : Marinemalerei in dreihundert Jahren (in German). Herford: Koehler. ISBN 978-3-7822-0244-2.
