= HHLA =

German logistics and transportation company

Hamburger Hafen und Logistik AG
- Company type: Aktiengesellschaft
- Traded as: FWB: HHFA
- Industry: Logistics, transportation
- Founded: 7 March 1885
- Headquarters: Hamburg, Germany
- Key people: Angela Titzrath, Chief executive officer; Rüdiger Grube, Chairman of Supervisory board
- Services: Container terminals, cargo handling and transport
- Revenue: € 1,382.6 million (2019)
- Operating income: € 221.2 million (2019)
- Net income: € 137.1 million (2019)
- Total assets: € 2,610.0 million (2019)
- Total equity: € 578,862 thousand (2019)
- Number of employees: 6,296 (2019)
- Website: www.hhla.de

Hamburger Hafen und Logistik AG (abbreviated HHLA), known until 2005 as Hamburger Hafen- und Lagerhaus-Aktiengesellschaft, and prior to that as Hamburger Freihafen-Lagerhaus Gesellschaft (HFLG) since 1885, is a German logistics and transportation company specialising in port throughput and container and transport logistics.

== Overview ==
HHLA's core business is divided into four business segments:

- Container
- Intermodal
- Logistics
- Real estate

As of 31 December 2019, the company employed 6,296 people worldwide, and generated revenue of €1.38 billion.

Shares in the Port Logistics subgroup ("Class A shares") have been listed since November 2007. Class A shares in HHLA were included in the MDAX from 2008 to 2013 before becoming part of the SDAX in June 2013. The Real Estate subgroup covers the company's properties that are not specific to port handling, with its shares listed as "Class S". These cannot be freely traded and are entirely owned by the City of Hamburg. HHLA's administrative headquarters is known as the Speicherstadtrathaus.

=== Container ===
HHLA operates three of the four container terminals in the Port of Hamburg:

- Container Terminal Altenwerder (CTA, operational since mid-2002) As of 2019, HHLA Container Terminal Altenwerder CTA was almost completely automated.
- Container Terminal Burchardkai (CTB) Container Terminal Burchardkai is the largest and oldest surviving container handling facility at the Port of Hamburg.
- Container Terminal Tollerort (CTT)

In 2019, about 7.6 million TEU were handled here (2018: 7.3 million TEU). As of 2018, the shipping company Hapag-Lloyd owned a share of 25.1% in the terminal.

In June 2018, HHLA acquired the largest Estonian terminal operator Transiidikeskuse AS (headquartered in Muuga). At the time, the container terminal had a handling capacity of approximately 300,000 TEU. HHLA's Container segment also includes a number of services related to container handling offered by its subsidiaries. As of 2019, HHLA also owned a container terminal at the Port of Odesa.

=== Intermodal ===
This segment covers container transport by rail and road. The sector includes the transport company Metrans and road transport company Container-Transport-Dienst (CTD). Metrans operates container trains from its own terminals in the Czech Republic, Austria, Slovakia, Hungary, Poland and neighbouring countries; CTD covers the area surrounding the Hamburg Metropolitan Region by road. In 2012, HHLA sold its 50% share in TFG Transfracht to Deutsche Bahn, and in 2018, Polzug Intermodal merged with Metrans. In 2019, the intermodal companies transported a total of 1.6 million standard containers by rail and road.

=== Logistics ===
This segment incorporates warehouse logistics and special handling, consulting, and various Start-ups. It includes a number of equity holdings and subsidiaries, including the consulting firm HPC Hamburg Port Consulting. The fruit terminal at O'Swaldkai is also part of this segment. At the same port is a RoRo terminal handling rolling cargo (RoRo). Together with Salzgitter AG, HHLA also operates the Hansaport, Germany's largest terminal for bulk cargo.

=== Real estate ===
HHLA develops, designs and operates commercial properties. These include the Speicherstadt historical warehouse district, the area surrounding the Fischmarkt Hamburg-Altona as well as other logistics facilities and office buildings in and around the Port of Hamburg.

=== Other ===
The company supports and oversees the development of start-ups and holds investments in technology companies in the areas of drone technology and 3D printing. It co-founded the joint venture Hyperport Cargo Solutions to develop a component to bring Hyperloop technology to ports.

== History ==
=== 1885–1945 ===
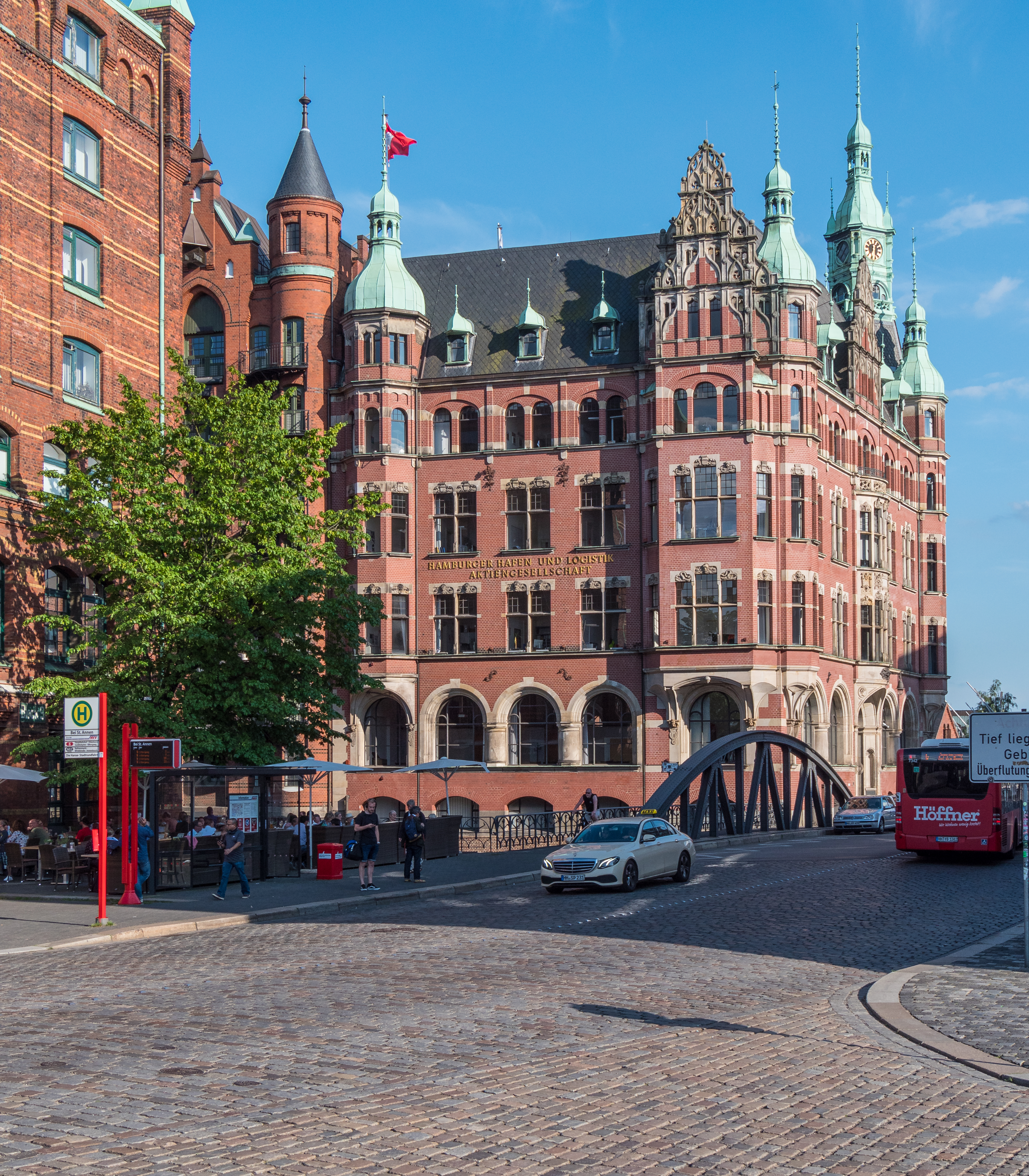
Administrative building in the Speicherstadt

Hamburg's state quay administration was founded in 1866. Its role included organising transloading for the city and the maintenance of both the wharfs and the equipment and machinery on them. In March 1885, the city founded the Hamburger Freihafen-Lagerhaus-Gesellschaft (HFLG). As part of Hamburg's inclusion in the German Imperial customs system, the company's role was to build and maintain the world's most modern and largest logistics centre at that time – Hamburg's Speicherstadt historical warehouse district. It was an Aktiengesellschaft from the very beginning, with the city contributing the property and Norddeutsche Bank the capital. Construction of the Speicherstadt warehouse district began in 1885 and was largely completed by 1912. By 1913, the Port of Hamburg was the third-largest in the world behind the ports of London and New York.

During World War I (1914–1918), the Royal Navy blocked the seaports of the German Reich. This brought business in Hamburg and its port to a complete standstill. In the Treaty of Versailles, the allied powers forced Germany to give up the majority of its merchant navy. Companies such as HAPAG were, however, able to retool in the coming years. In 1927, the City of Hamburg became the sole shareholder in HFLG.

The effects of the Great Depression (from 1929), protectionism in many industrial countries, the seizure of control by the National Socialists (1933) and their autarky policy saw cross border trade drop to levels lower than before the crisis. In 1935, HFLG merged with the state quay administration to become the Betriebsgesellschaft der hamburgischen Hafenanlagen. As well as operating the port facilities, it was also responsible for their upkeep and expansion. In 1939, the company was renamed, becoming Hamburger Hafen- und Lagerhaus-Aktiengesellschaft (HHLA). During World War II, HHLA employed forced labour. Allied bombers attacked the Port of Hamburg multiple times, destroying large parts of it.

=== 1945–2000 ===
The Second World War ended in May 1945. The Port of Hamburg had suffered further damage. Around 90% of the quay shed area was destroyed, and two thirds of the warehouses were left unusable. Large parts of the quay walls lay in ruins. Almost 3,000 shipwrecks prevented regulated shipping movements. The reconstruction of the port was largely completed by 1956.

1967 saw the opening of the "Übersee-Zentrum". It was, at the time, the world's largest distribution shed and was used as a distribution facility for mixed break bulk cargo. It remained in use until 2016. The first container ship docked in the Port of Hamburg in 1968. It was handled at Burchardkai – where HHLA later built the Container Terminal Burchardkai – using container cranes. In 1970, new port order regulations relieved HHLA of all sovereign functions. This created competition between companies in the port industry. In 1978, HHLA opened its new fruit and cooling centre for fruit and refrigerated goods, which has been modernised multiple times in the years since.

In 1990, many of the former Eastern Bloc states became independent after the dissolution of the Soviet Union. The Port of Hamburg was soon able to resume handling cargo for these countries (its Hinterland was now much larger). HHLA began to invest in a number of companies that organised container transport on the railway network, and the volume of cargo that they handled rose.

=== 2000- present ===
On 25 June 2002, the first container ship was handled at the new Container Terminal Altenwerder (CTA) . On 1 October 2005, the company changed its name to Hamburger Hafen und Logistik AG. The abbreviation HHLA remained.

HHLA was retroactively split into the subgroups Port Logistics and Real Estate with effect from 1 January 2007. On 2 November 2007, the Port Logistics subgroup was listed on the stock exchange. Since its initial public offering in October 2007, HHLA shares have been traded on the Prime Standard at the Frankfurt Stock Exchange and the Hamburg Stock Exchange.

In 2010, Burchardkai and am Tollerort were fused to decrease costs after a decrease of 30 percent in container business and 20 percent in across land logistics in 2009. There had been delays in the digging of the Elbe to deepen it for large container ships.

In early 2023, Chinese shipping firm Cosco bought one of the three terminals, which caused protests by the German government coalition (Scholz cabinet)and from abroad. In September 2023 it was reported that billionaire Klaus-Michael Kühne wanted to take over HHLA. which was followed by an offer of Swiss MSC of nearly 1.3 billion euros.

== Gallery ==
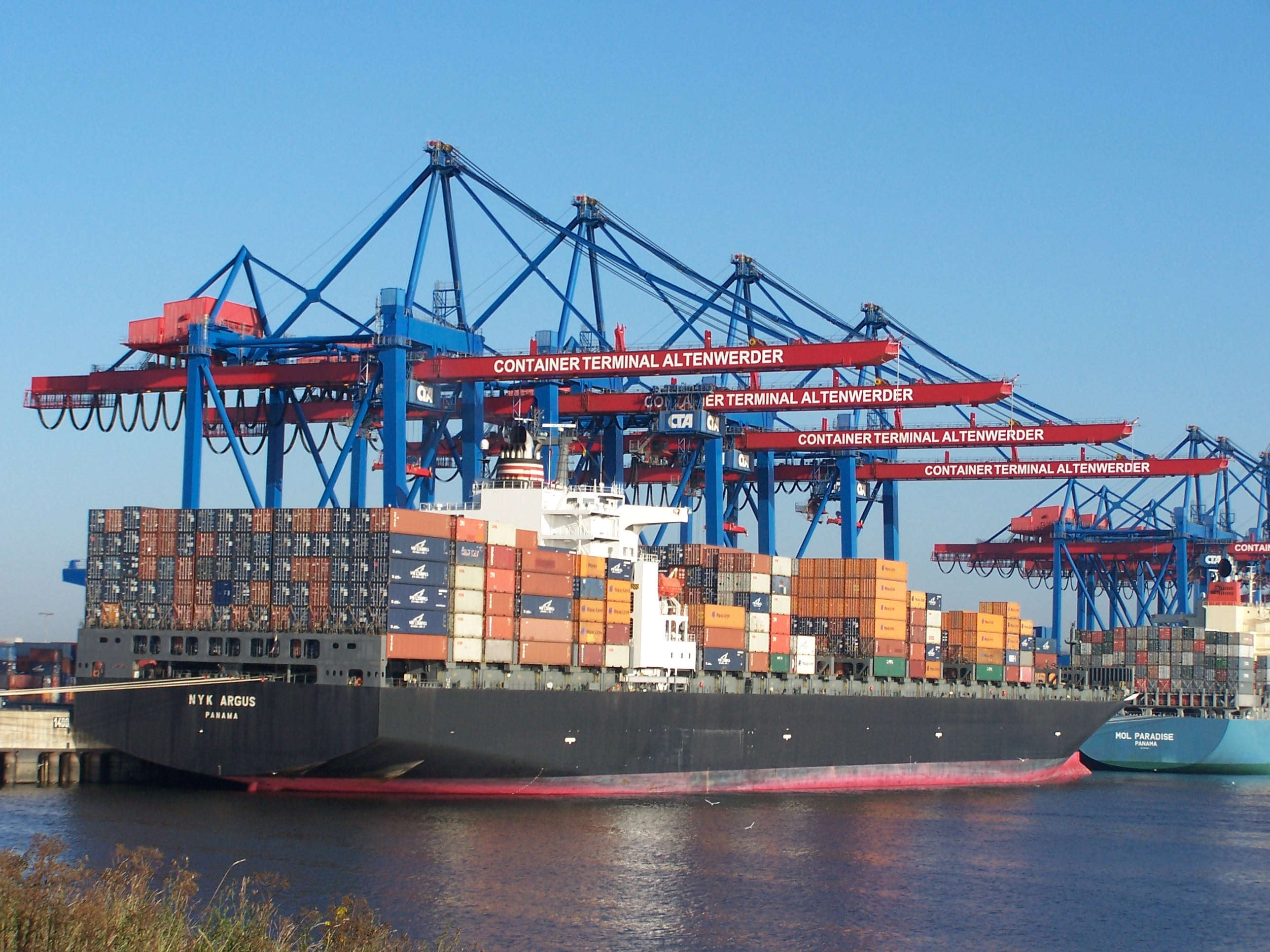
Container Terminal Altenwerder (2006)

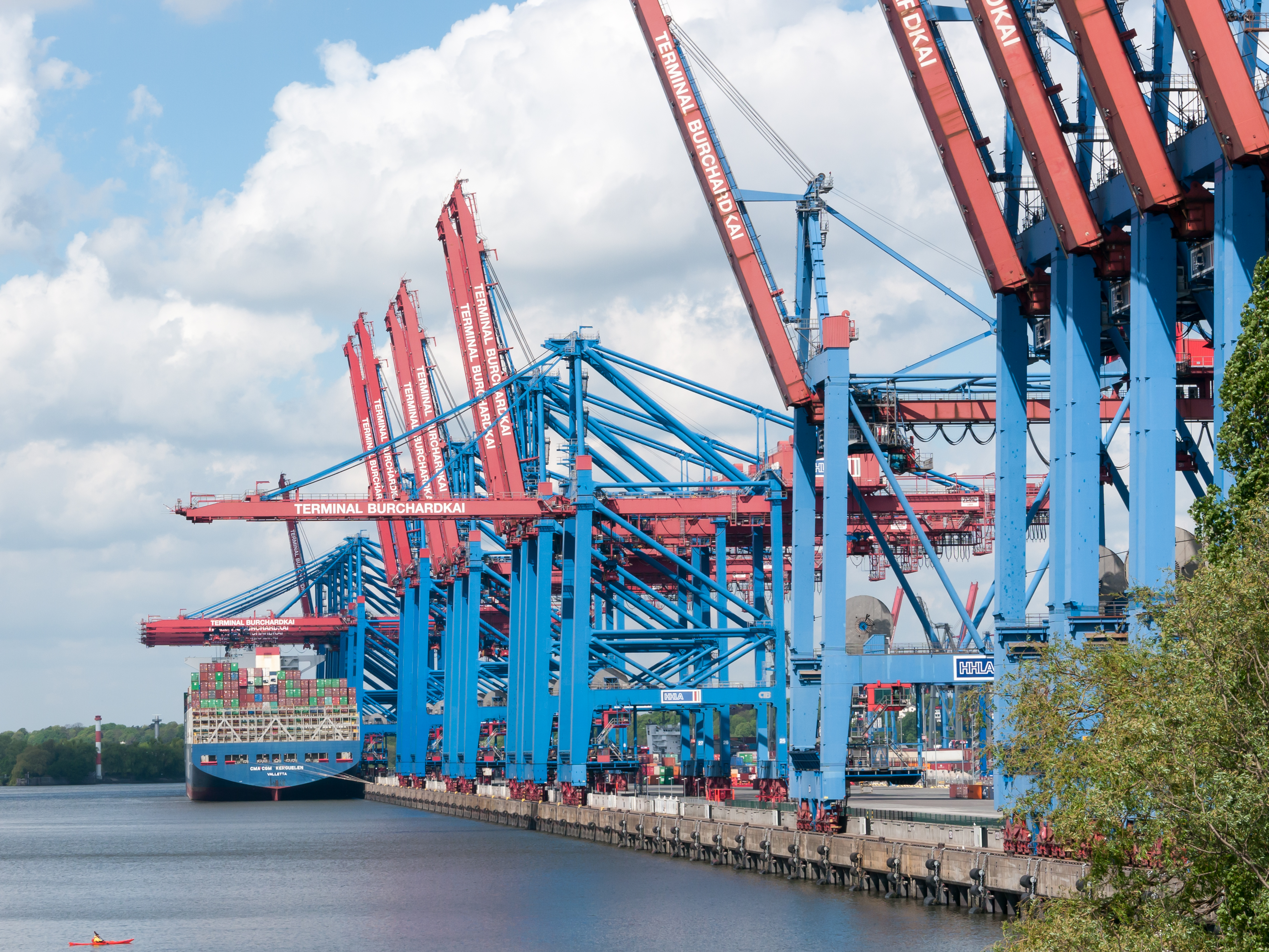
Container Terminal Burchardkai (2019)

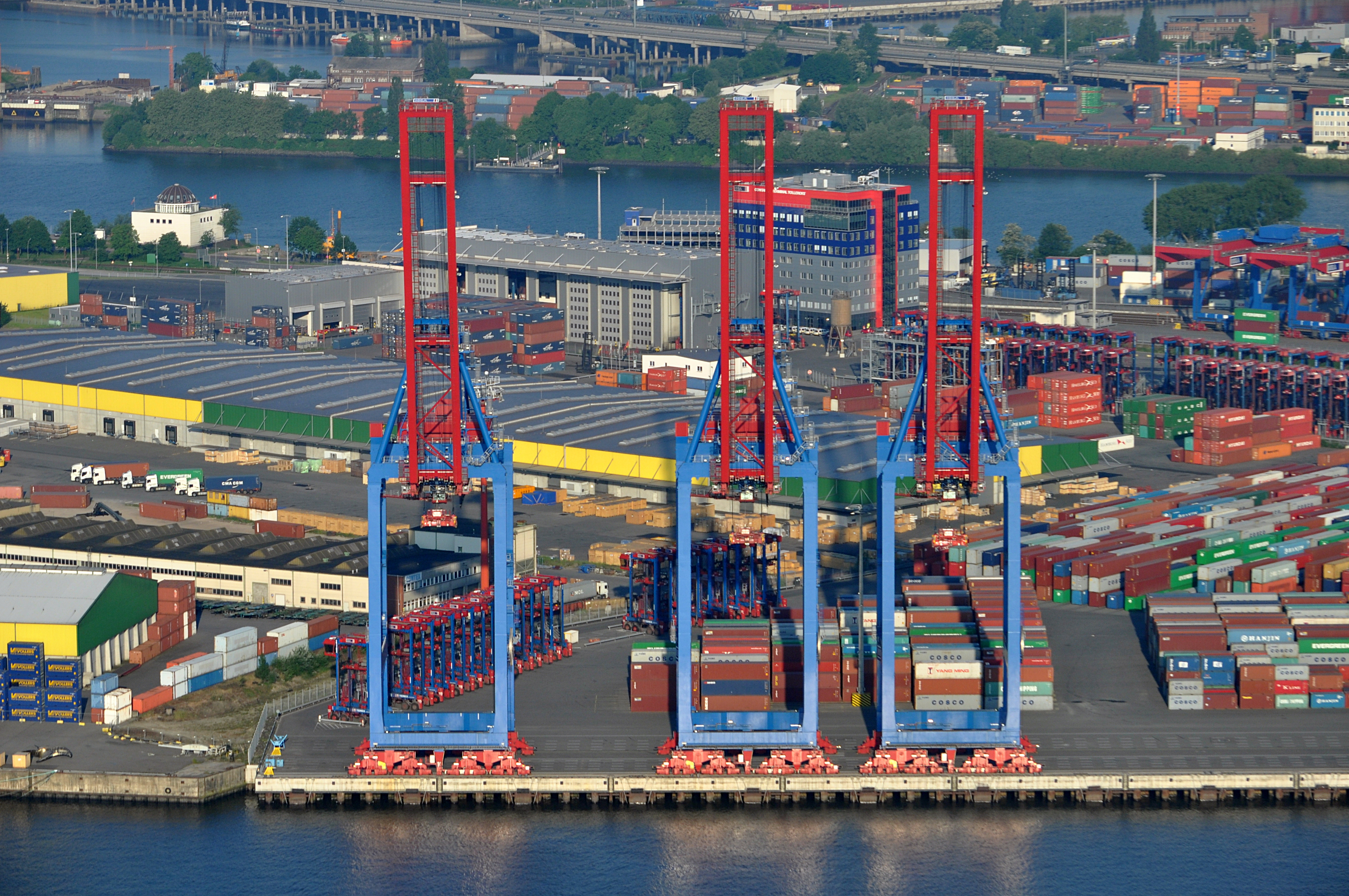
Container Terminal Tollerort (2013)

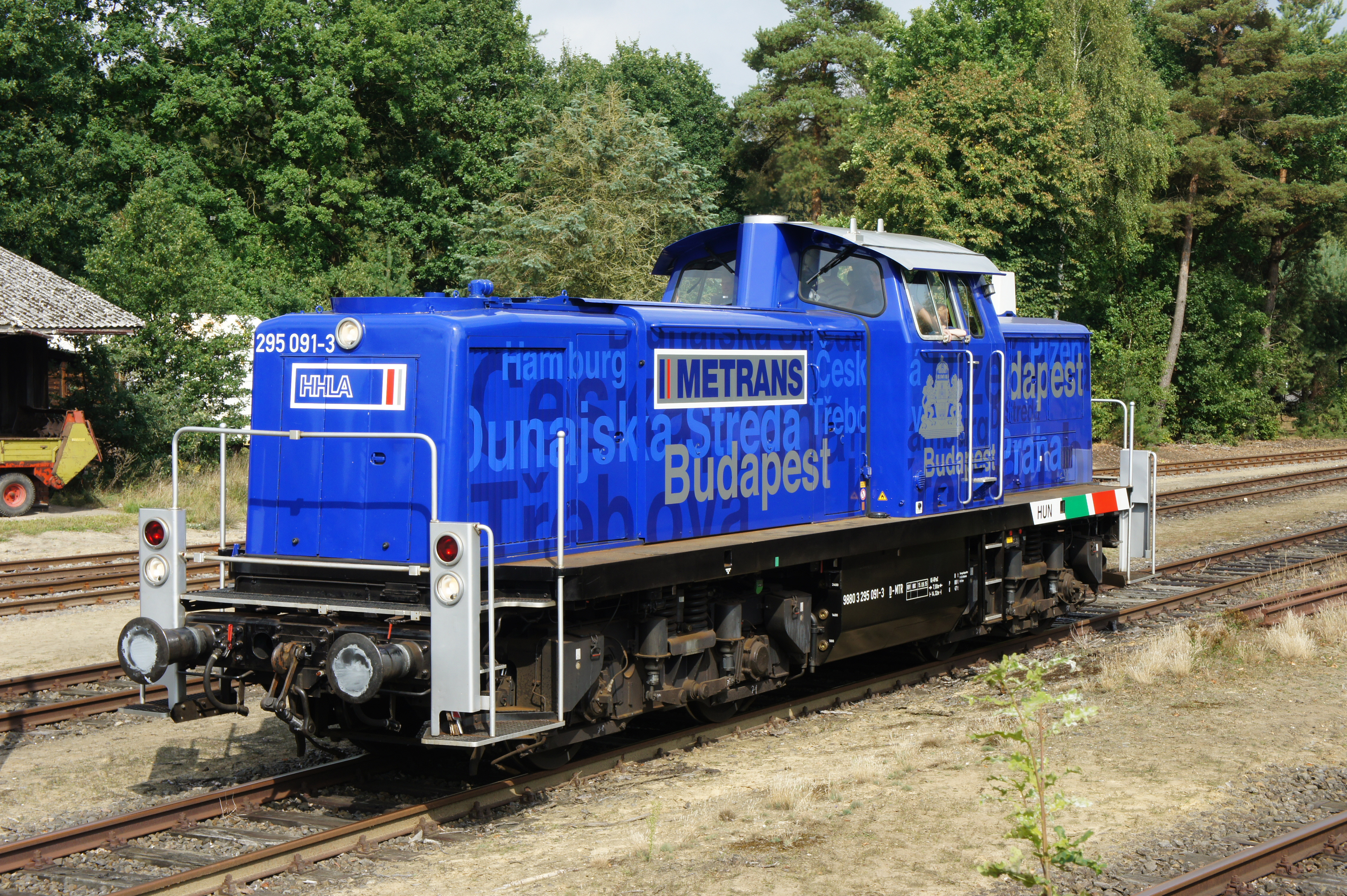
V 90 of Metrans (2016)

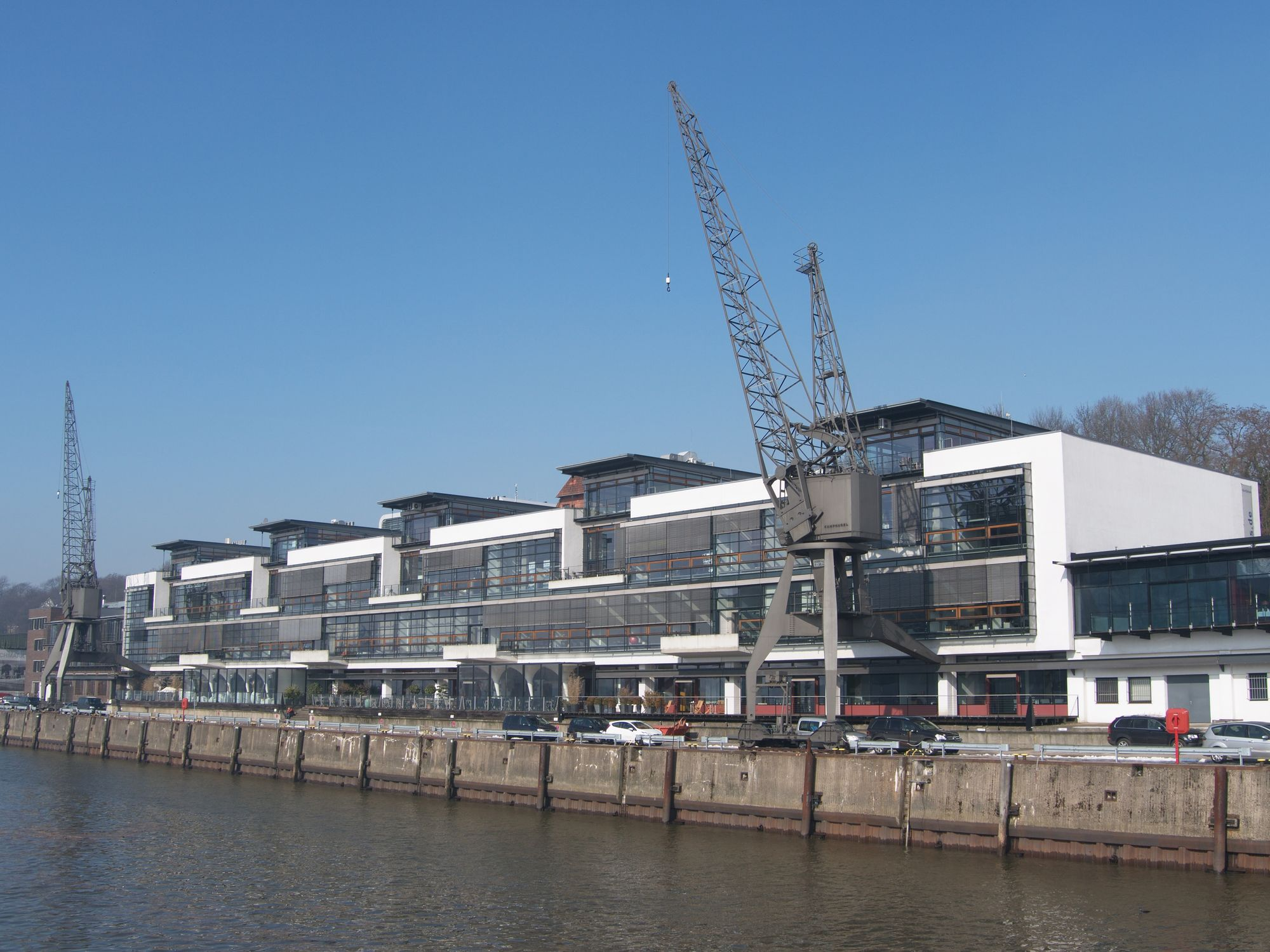
Elbkaihaus (Real Estate, 2010)
