= Stammann & Zinnow =

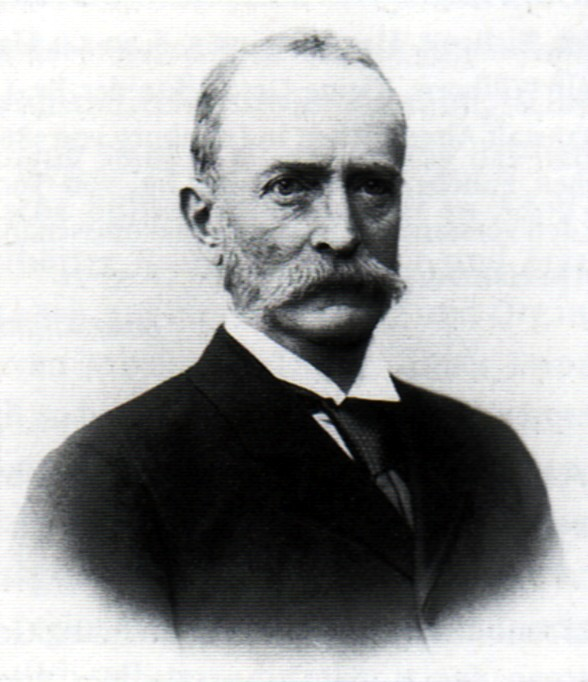
Hugo Stammann

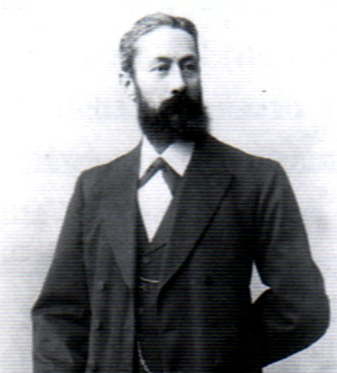
Gustav Zinnow

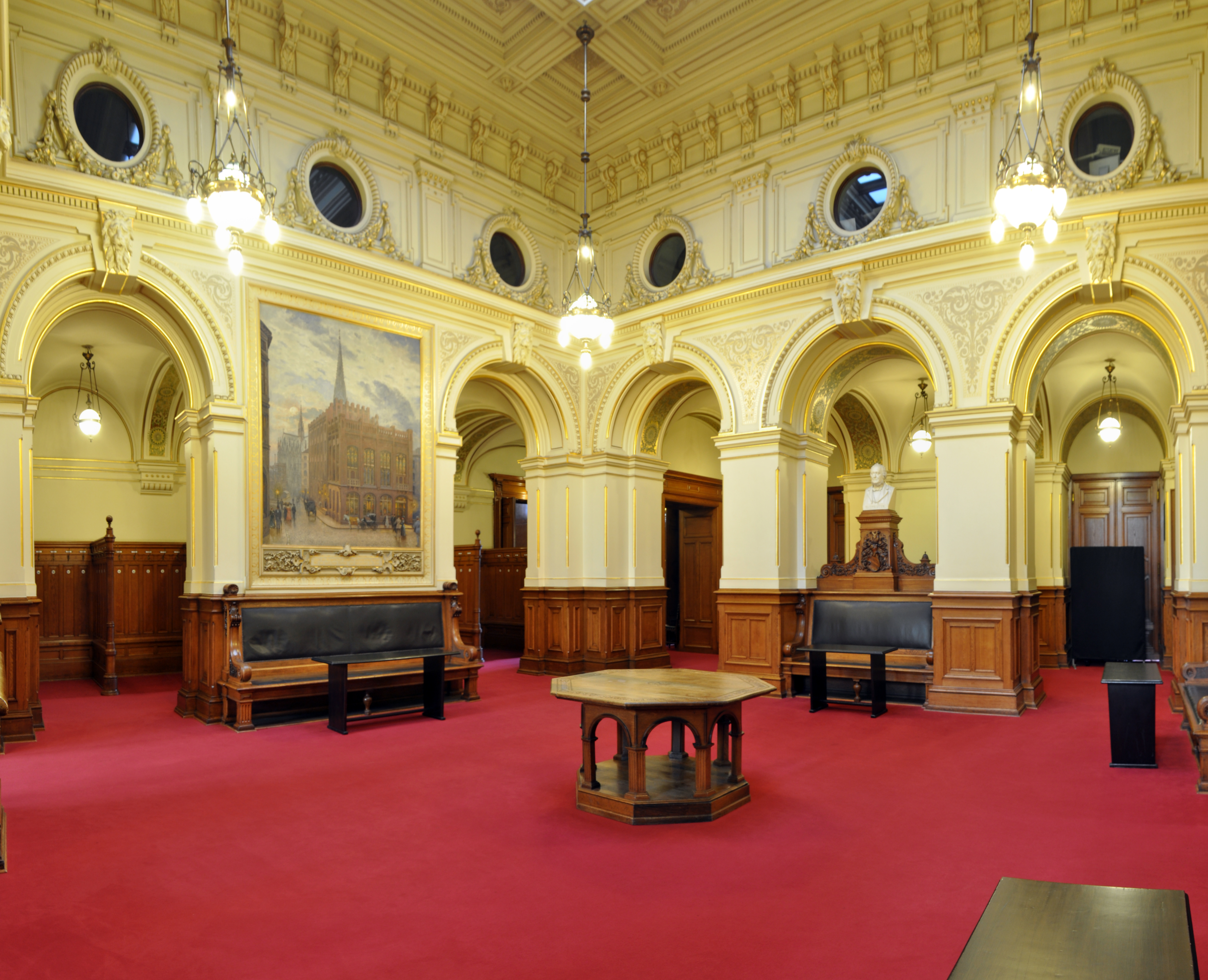
Entry hall at the Hamburg Parliament

Hugo Stammann (12 May 1831, in Hamburg – 1 November 1909, in Hamburg) and Karl Friedrich Gustav Zinnow (26 January 1846, in Berlin – 8 January 1934, in Hamburg) were German architects. They are primarily remembered for their work on the Hamburg City Hall.

== Lives and work ==
Stammann was the only son of the famous Hamburg architect, Franz Georg Stammann. After finishing an apprenticeship as a carpenter and studying at the Bauakademie in Berlin, he worked for August Soller, a Master Builder for the Prussian Council of Architecture. When Soller died, he returned to Hamburg, spent a short time in his father's office, then went to the United States, where he worked as an urban planner. He returned to Germany in 1864 and started his own practice.

Zinnow, on the other hand, came from a working-class background. His father was a stone mason. Both of his parents died during a cholera pandemic so, following a stay in an orphanage, he was adopted and raised by an aunt. After finishing school, he was apprenticed as a bricklayer and attended a trade school. In 1866, he found employment as a draftsman in the elder Stammann's office. In 1873, during the building boom that followed the Proclamation of the German Empire, Hugo took him on as a partner. Two years later, he married Bertha Philippine Beit (1851–1907), the sister of Alfred and Otto Beit.

Their major projects included the Norddeutsche Bank building on Neuer Wall, conversion and expansion of the Thalia Theatre, a major structure for the Zollverein (Customs Union), and the Hospital zum Heiligen Geist, which was destroyed during World War II.

In 1886, they became part of a group of architects known as the "Rathausbaumeisterbund", organized by Martin Haller, which was commissioned to create the new Hamburg City Hall; a project that lasted until 1897. Stammann & Zinnow designed much of the area devoted to the Hamburg Parliament.

After Stammann's death, Zinnow ran the office alone, until the beginning of World War I. A street in Hamburg's Winterhude district was named after Stammann in 1928.

== Sources ==
- Jan Lubitz: "Stammann, Hugo". In: Franklin Kopitzsch, Dirk Brietzke (Eds.): Hamburgische Biografie. Vol.5. Wallstein, Göttingen 2010, ISBN 978-3-8353-0640-0, pp. 355–356.
- Jan Lubitz: "Zinnow, Gustav". In: Franklin Kopitzsch, Dirk Brietzke (Eds.): Hamburgische Biografie. Vol.5. Wallstein, Göttingen 2010, ISBN 978-3-8353-0640-0, pp. 398–399.
