= Wilhelm Emil Meerwein =

German architect and politician

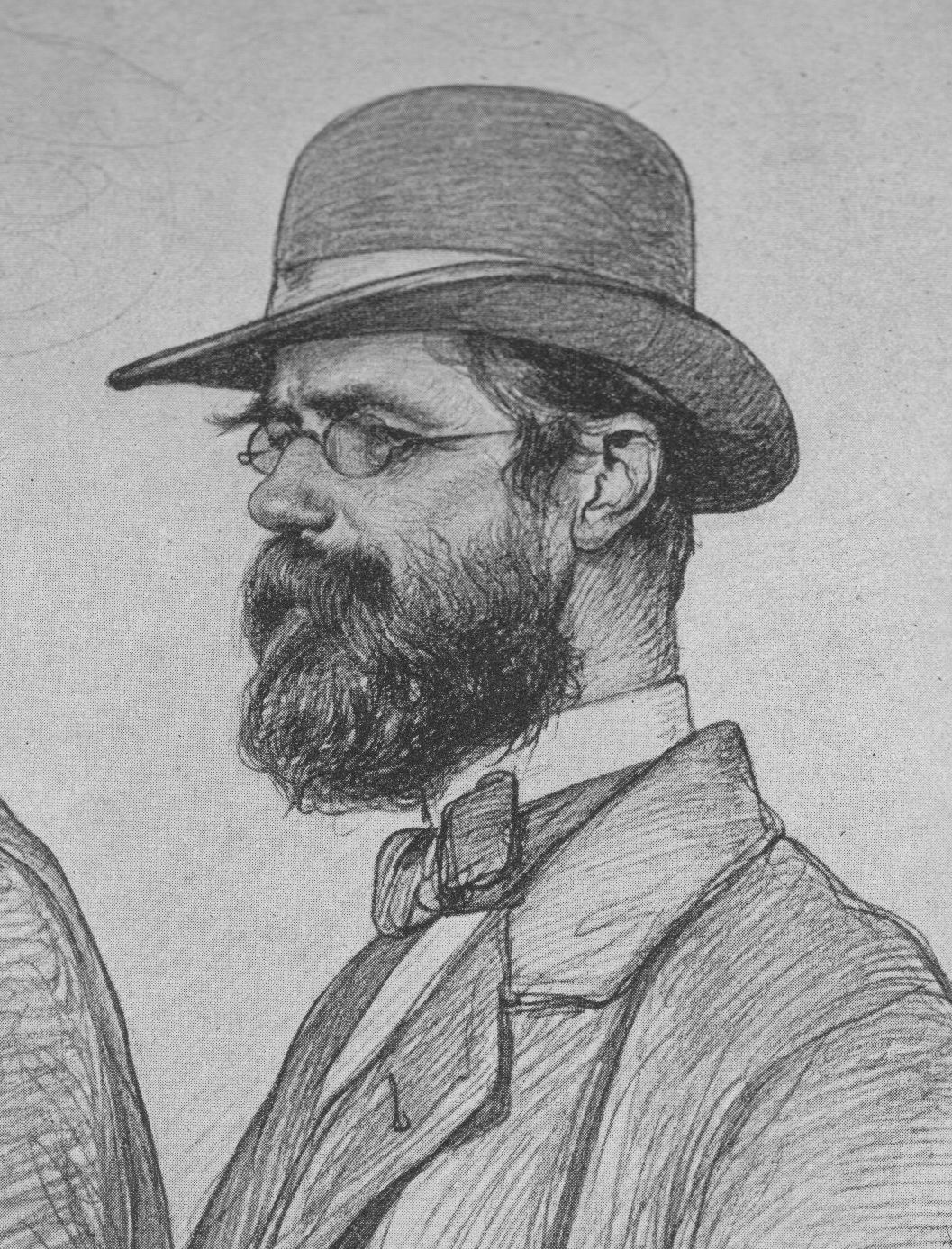
Wilhelm Emil Meerwein; from a drawing by Christian Wilhelm Allers (c. 1894)

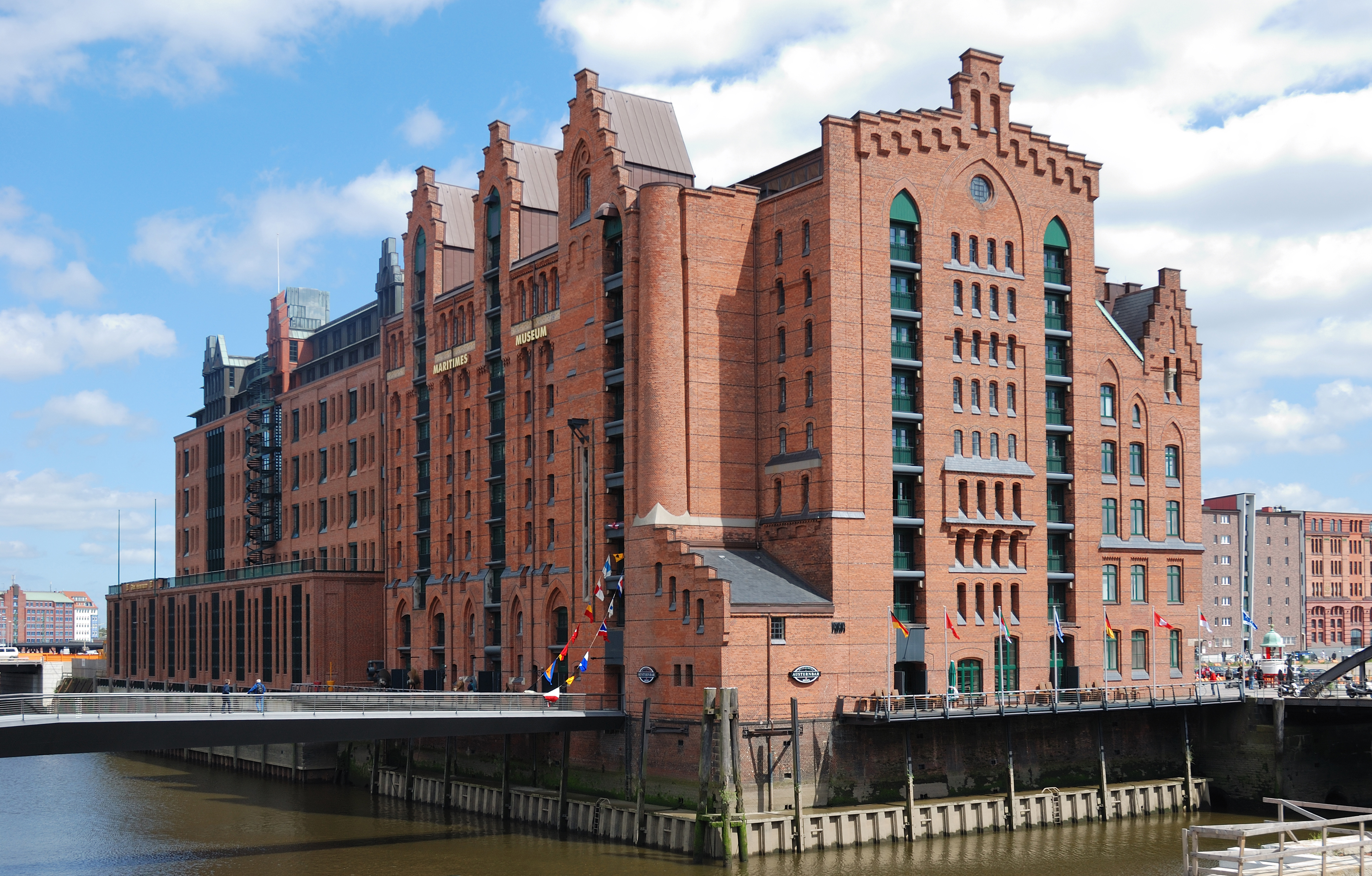
The International Maritime Museum; formerly Quay Warehouse B

Wilhelm Emil Meerwein (17 September 1844 in Amsterdam – 25 January 1927 in Hamburg) was a German architect and politician.

== Biography ==
He spent his childhood in Switzerland, and began his professional studies at the Polytechnikum in Zürich with Gottfried Semper. After further studies in Karlsruhe, where he met his future business partner, Bernhard Georg Hanssen, and at the Bauakademie in Berlin, he briefly worked as a site manager at the Royal Prussian Mint. Following several study trips, throughout Europe and the Middle East, he settled in Stuttgart in 1871, where he worked with Christian Friedrich von Leins.

In 1873, after winning a design competition in Hamburg, he encountered his old friend, Hanssen, and they set up a practice there. It became one of the largest architectural firms in Hamburg. Their best known project is the Kaispeicher B, part of the Speicherstadt development at the Hamburg waterfront (1878-79). Since 2008, it has been the home of the International Maritime Museum.

He was a member of the "Rathausbaumeisterbund", an association created in 1885 by Martin Haller, which was commissioned to create the new Hamburg City Hall; a project that lasted from 1886 to 1897.

In 1899, he was one of the judges in a competition to design a scrapbook for the trading cards that came with chocolates from the Stollwerck company of Cologne. His fellow judges were Justus Brinckmann, an art director, Georg Hulbe, a bookbinder, Julius Christian Rehder (1861–1955), a painter, and Bruno Schmitz, an architect.

In 1901, he became a member of the Hamburg Parliament and was no longer active in his architectural firm. He served as a member until 1919. Hanssen's health went into a period of decline, so he retired and closed their offices in 1905.

A street in Hamburg's Winterhude district is named after him. His son, Hans, became a well known chemist.
