= Bernhard Georg Hanssen =

German architect and politician

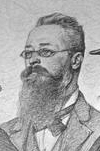
- Hanssen; from a drawing by Christian Wilhelm Allers (c. 1894)
- Born: 12 April 1844; Hamburg
- Died: 3 September 1911; Travemünde

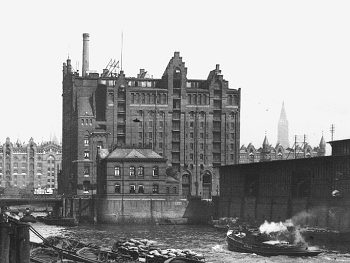
Kaispeicher B (c. 1920)

Bernhard Georg Jacob Hanssen (1844–1911) was a German architect and politician.

== Life and work ==
After completing an apprenticeship as a carpenter, he studied architecture in Karlsruhe (1863–64) and Stuttgart (1865). Following that, he worked as a site manager for Christian Friedrich von Leins, who was engaged in restoring rural churches. He then studied for an additional two years in Berlin while working part time for several architectural firms. From 1870, he was in Hamburg where he was employed by an engineer named Schmetzer; until 1873, when he and an old friend from Karlsruhe, Wilhelm Emil Meerwein, began their own architectural practice.

Their best known project is, perhaps, the Kaispeicher B (Quay Warehouse B, 1878–79), a large structure on Hamburg's waterfront, which was incorporated into the Speicherstadt development. Since 2008, it has been the home of the International Maritime Museum.

He was a member of the Hamburger Künstlerverein (Artists' Association) and, from 1880 to 1886, served in the Hamburg Parliament. At that time, he joined the "Rathausbaumeisterbund", a group of architects, organized in 1885 by Martin Haller, who had been appointed to create the new Hamburg City Hall; a project that lasted from 1886 to 1897.

In 1901, Meerwein was elected to the Hamburg Parliament and devoted most of his time to it so, when Hanssen's health began to decline in 1905, he retired and closed their firm. He died six years later in the resort city of Travemünde.

A street in Hamburg's Winterhude district is named after him.
