= Speicherstadt =

Warehouse district in Hamburg, Germany

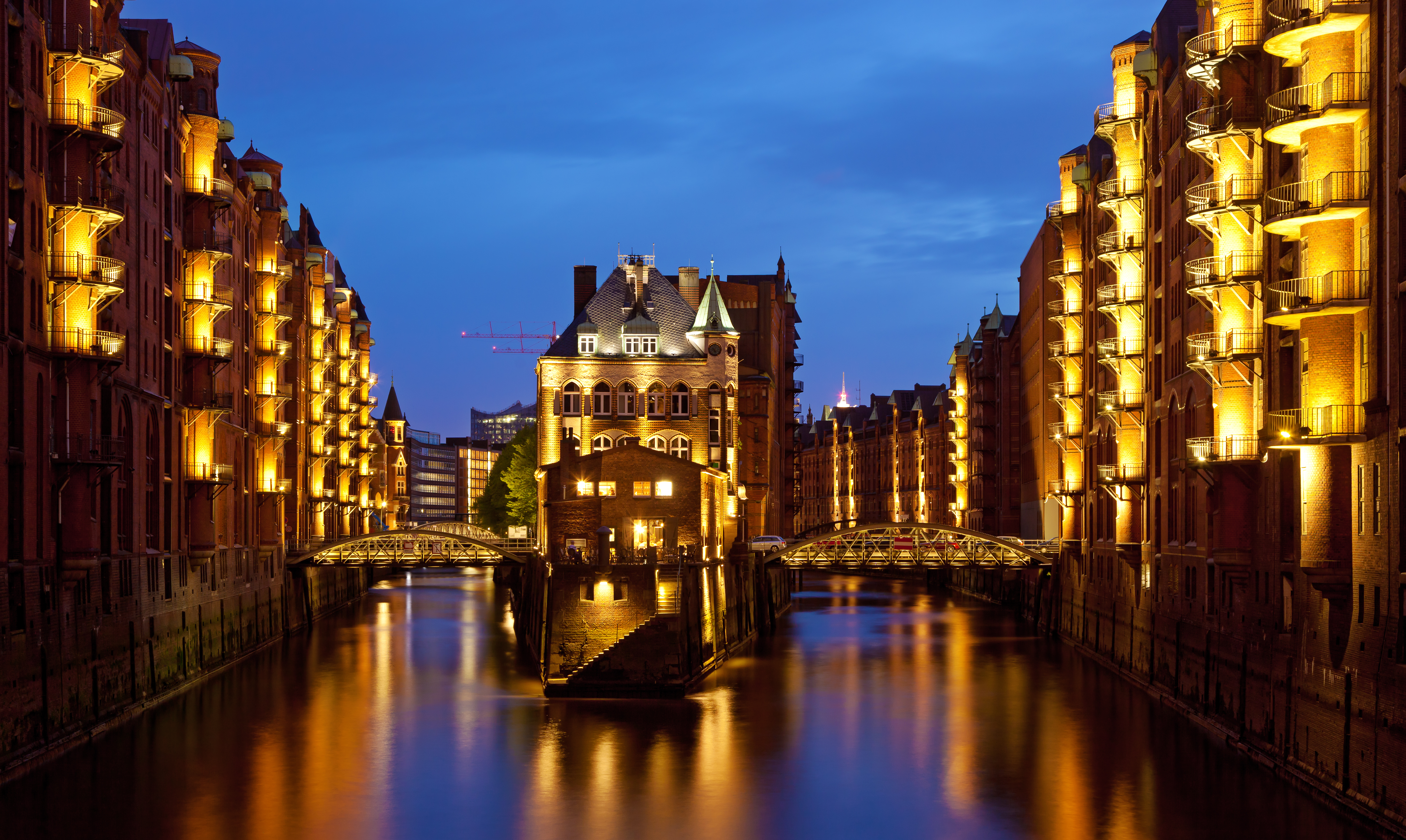
- View at night, 2012
- Interactive map of the Speicherstadt area

General information
- Type: warehouse district
- Architectural style: Gothic Revival
- Location: Hamburg, Germany
- Coordinates: 53°32′36″N 9°59′31″E
- Construction started: 1883
- Completed: 1927
- Opened: 1888
- Owner: Free and Hanseatic City of Hamburg

Dimensions
- Other dimensions: 1,500 m × 250 m

Technical details
- Material: red brick
- Size: 26 ha (64 acres)
- Floor area: 630,000 m^{2} (6,800,000 sq ft)

Design and construction
- Architect: Carl Johann Christian Zimmermann
- Engineer: Franz Andreas Meyer

UNESCO World Heritage Site
- Official name: Speicherstadt
- Type: cultural
- Criteria: iv
- Designated: 2015
- Part of: Speicherstadt and Kontorhaus District with Chilehaus
- Reference no.: 1467
- Property: 26.08 ha (64.4 acres)
- Buffer zone: 56.17 ha (138.8 acres)

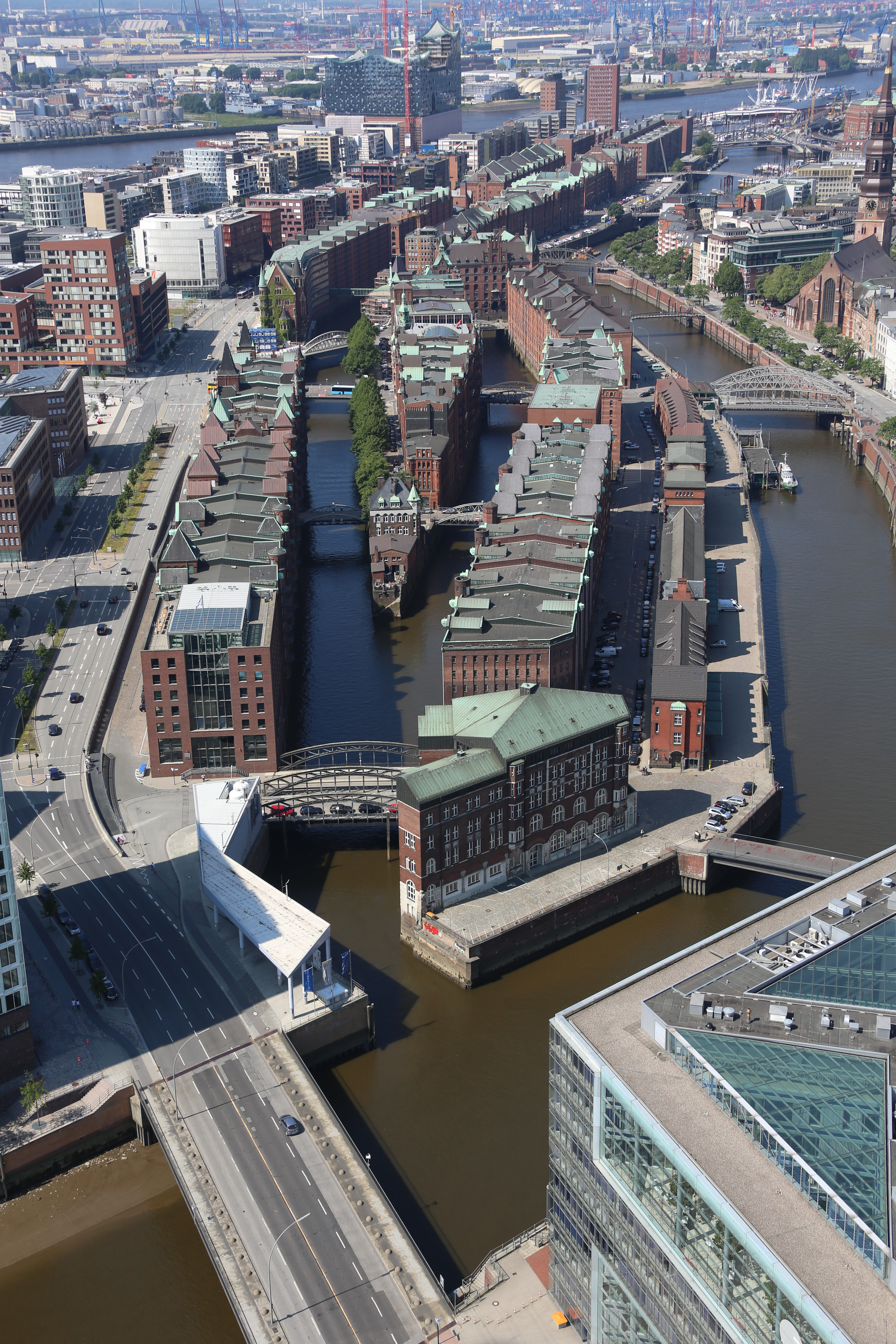
Aerial view of the Speicherstadt seen from the east

The Speicherstadt (German pronunciation: [ˈʃpaɪ̯çɐˌʃtat], literally: 'City of Warehouses', meaning warehouse district) in Hamburg, Germany, is the largest warehouse district in the world where the buildings stand on timber-pile foundations—oak logs, in this particular case. It is located in the port of Hamburg, in the HafenCity quarter, and was built from 1883 to 1927.

The district was built as a free zone to transfer goods without paying customs. The district and the surrounding area have been under redevelopment for many years as the port industry has evolved. As an exceptional example of Neo-Gothic and modernist architecture, and for its testimony to the development of international maritime trade, the Speicherstadt was awarded the status of UNESCO World Heritage Site on 5 July 2015, along with the Kontorhaus District.

== Geography ==
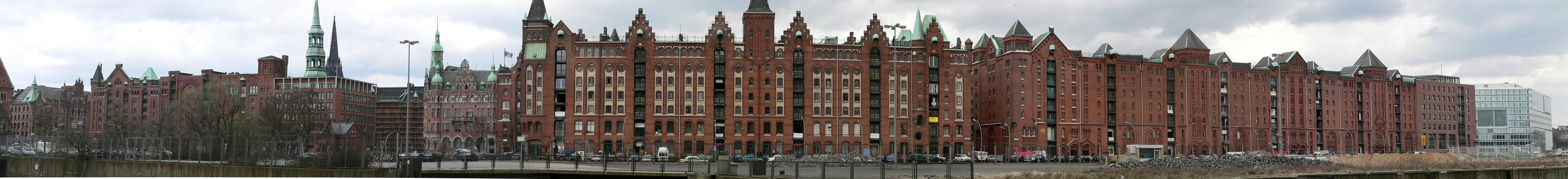
A panoramic view of the Speicherstadt

The Speicherstadt is located in the port of Hamburg. It is 1.5 km (0.93 mi) long and interlaced by loading canals (Low German: Fleets).

== History ==
From 1815, the independent and sovereign city of Hamburg was a member of the German Confederation – the association of Central European states created by the Congress of Vienna – but not a member of the German Customs Union.

Following the Austro-Prussian War which established Prussian hegemony in North Germany, Hamburg was obliged to join the North German Federation. However it obtained an opt-out in the form of Article 34 of the North German constitution, which stated that Hamburg and the other Hanseatic cities would remain as free ports outside the Community customs border until they apply for inclusion. Article 34 was carried over into the imperial constitution of 1871, when the south German states joined the federation. However, Hamburg came under great pressure from Berlin to join the Customs Union after 1879, when the latter's external tariff was greatly increased. In 1881 an agreement was signed between the Prussian Finance Minister Karl Hermann Bitter and the State Secretary of the imperial Treasury, on the one hand, Hamburg's Plenipotentiary Senators Versmann and O'Swald, and the envoy of the Hanseatic states in Berlin, Dr Krüger, on the other. Hamburg would join the Customs Union with all its territory, except a permanent free port district which the agreement specified. For this district, Article 34 would still apply, thus the freedoms of that district could not be abolished or restricted without Hamburg's approval.

In 1883, to clear space for the new port area, the demolition of the Kehrwieder and Wandrahm area began and more than 20,000 people needed to be relocated. The construction was completed before the start of World War I, managed by the Freihafen-Lagerhaus-Gesellschaft (the predecessor of the Hamburger Hafen und Logistik AG), which was also responsible for the subsequent operation.

After the destruction of about half of the buildings in Operation Gomorrah by bombing during World War II, the conservative rebuilding was finished in 1967, while the Hanseatic Trade Center now occupies the sites of the completely destroyed structures. In 1991 it was listed as a protected Hamburg heritage site. Since 2008, it has been part of the HafenCity quarter. In an attempt to revitalize the inner city area, the Hamburg government initiated the development of the HafenCity area, for example with the construction of the Elbe Philharmonic Hall.

== Architecture ==
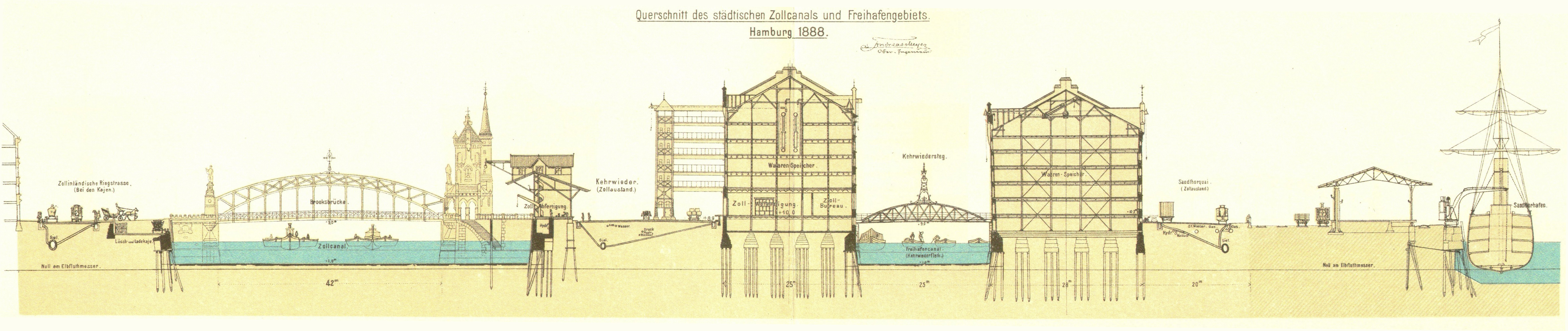
A cross-section view of the Speicherstadt from 1888

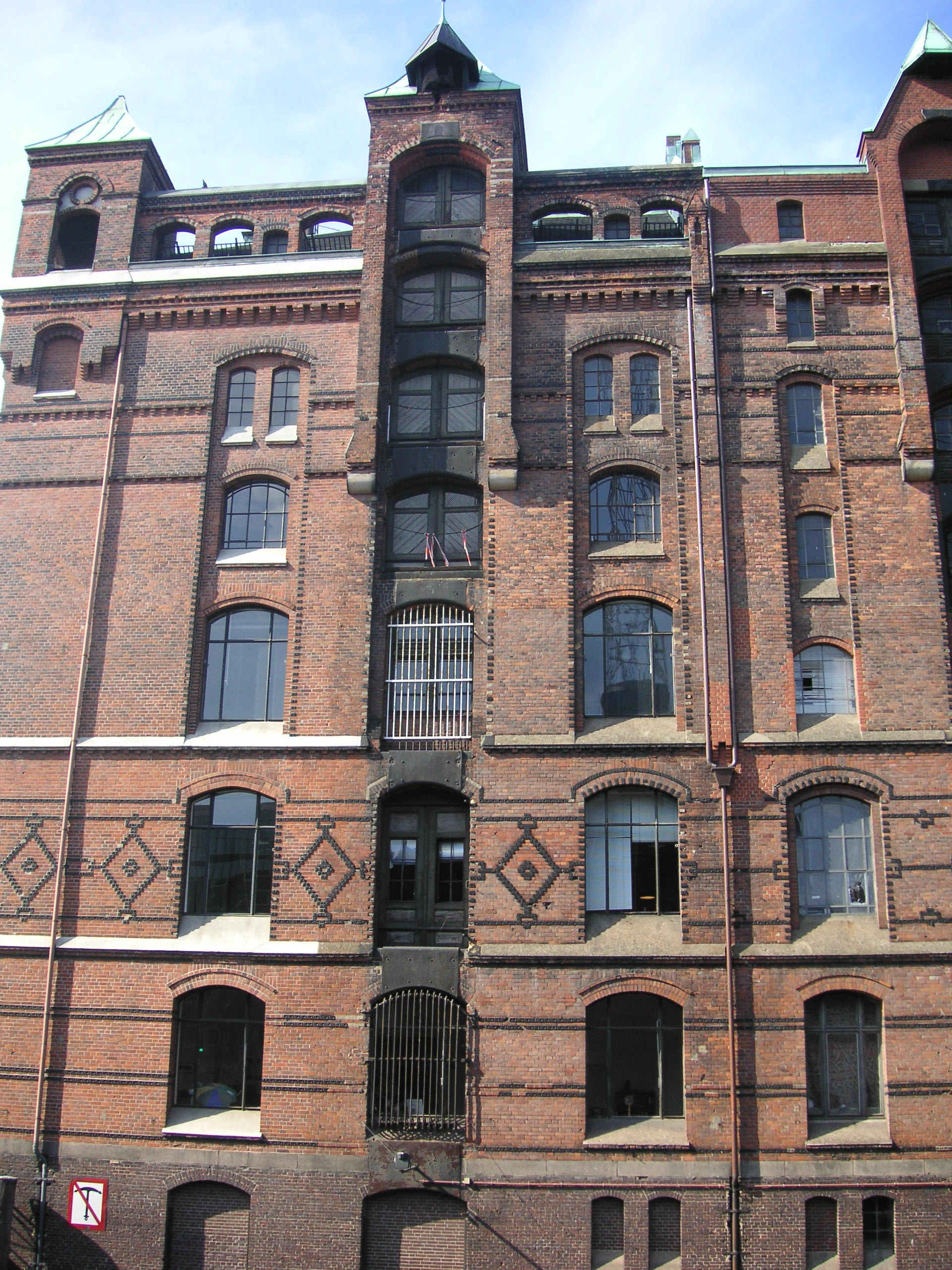
Facade of a warehouse

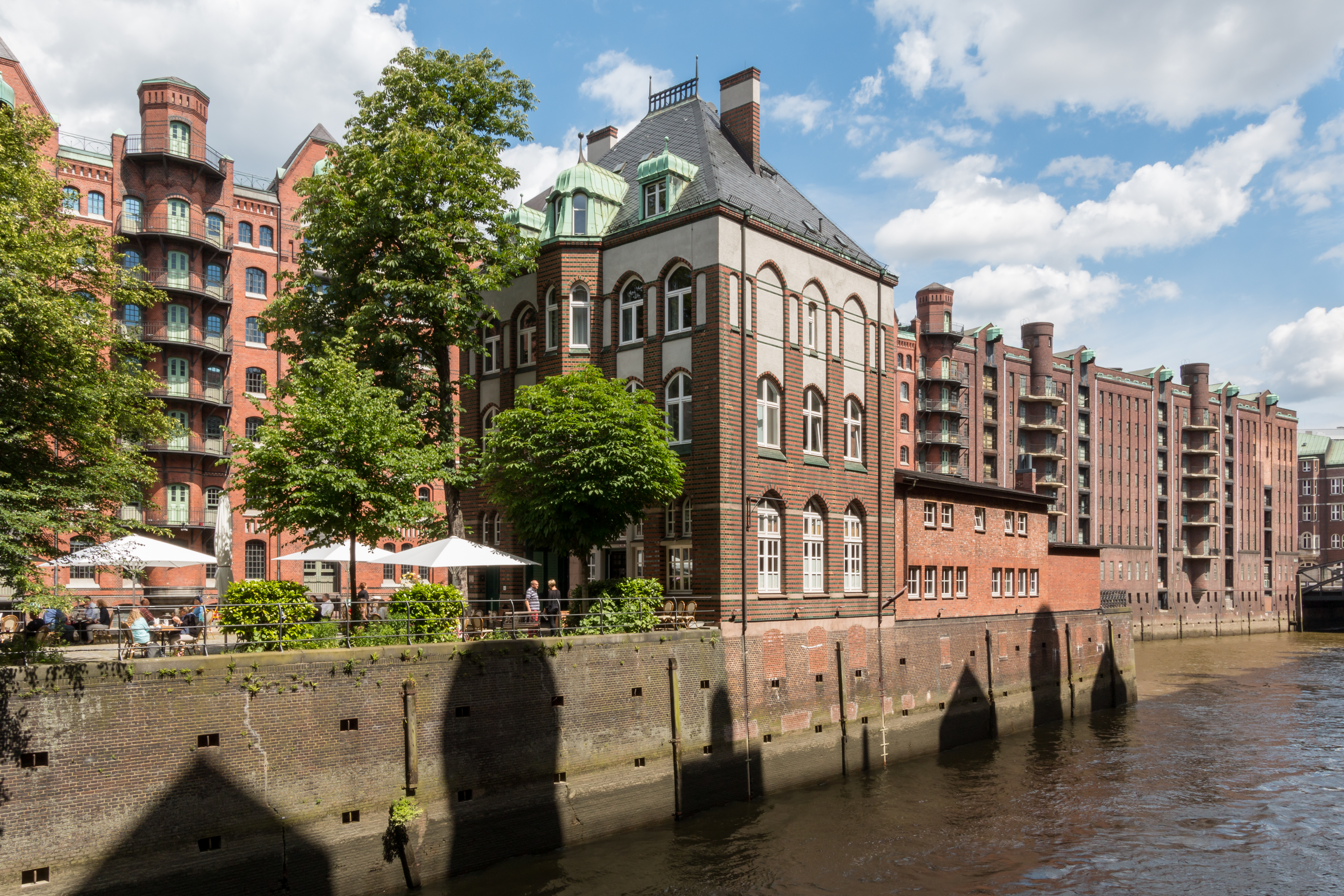
'Wasserschloss' at Holländischbrookfleet

The warehouses were built with different support structures, but Franz Andreas Meyer created a Neo-Gothic red-brick outer layer with little towers, alcoves, and glazed terra cotta ornaments. The warehouses are multi-storey buildings with entrances from water and land. One of the oldest warehouses is the Kaispeicher B of the International Maritime Museum.

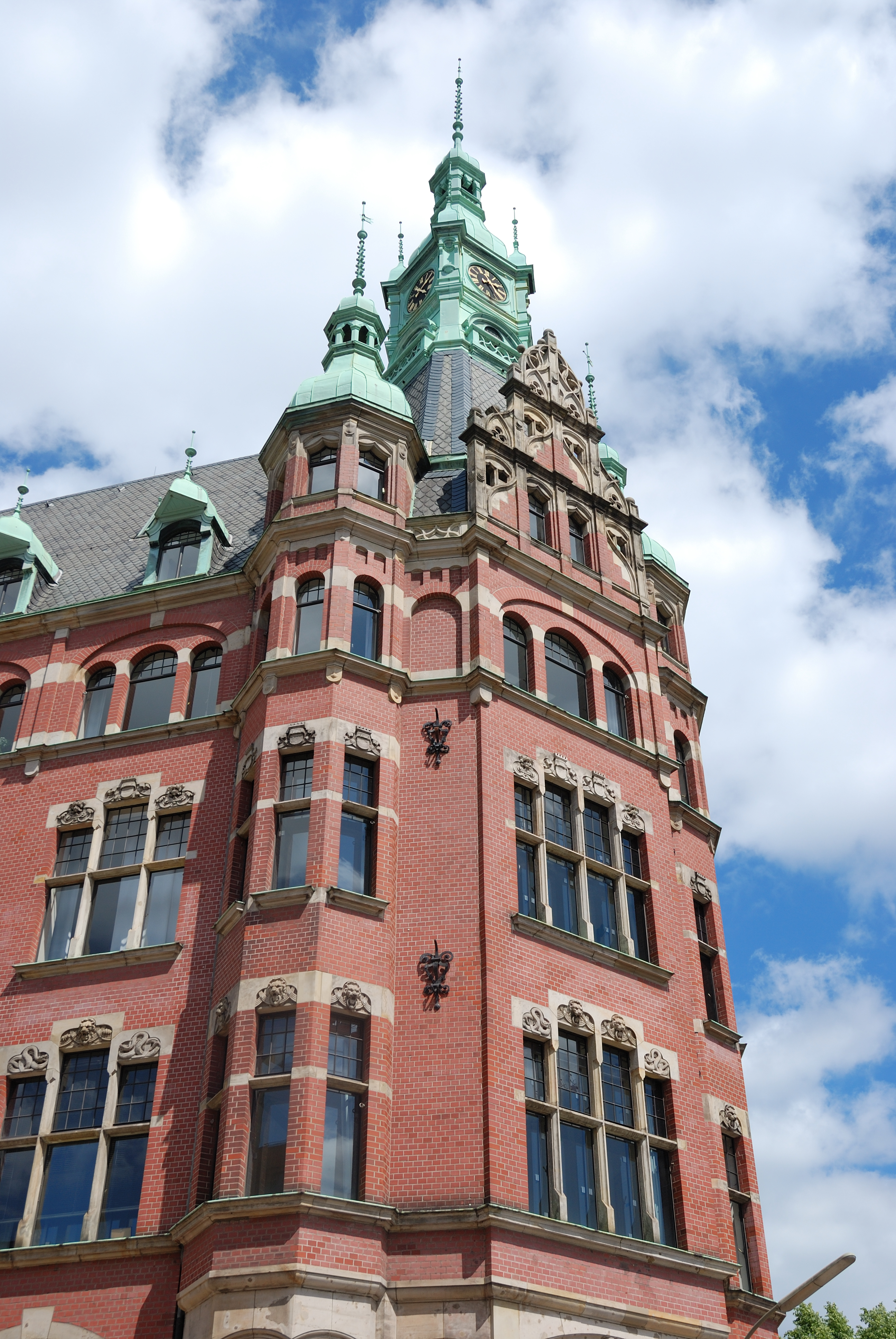
Hafenrathaus ('Harbour City Hall') in the Speicherstadt

== Use ==
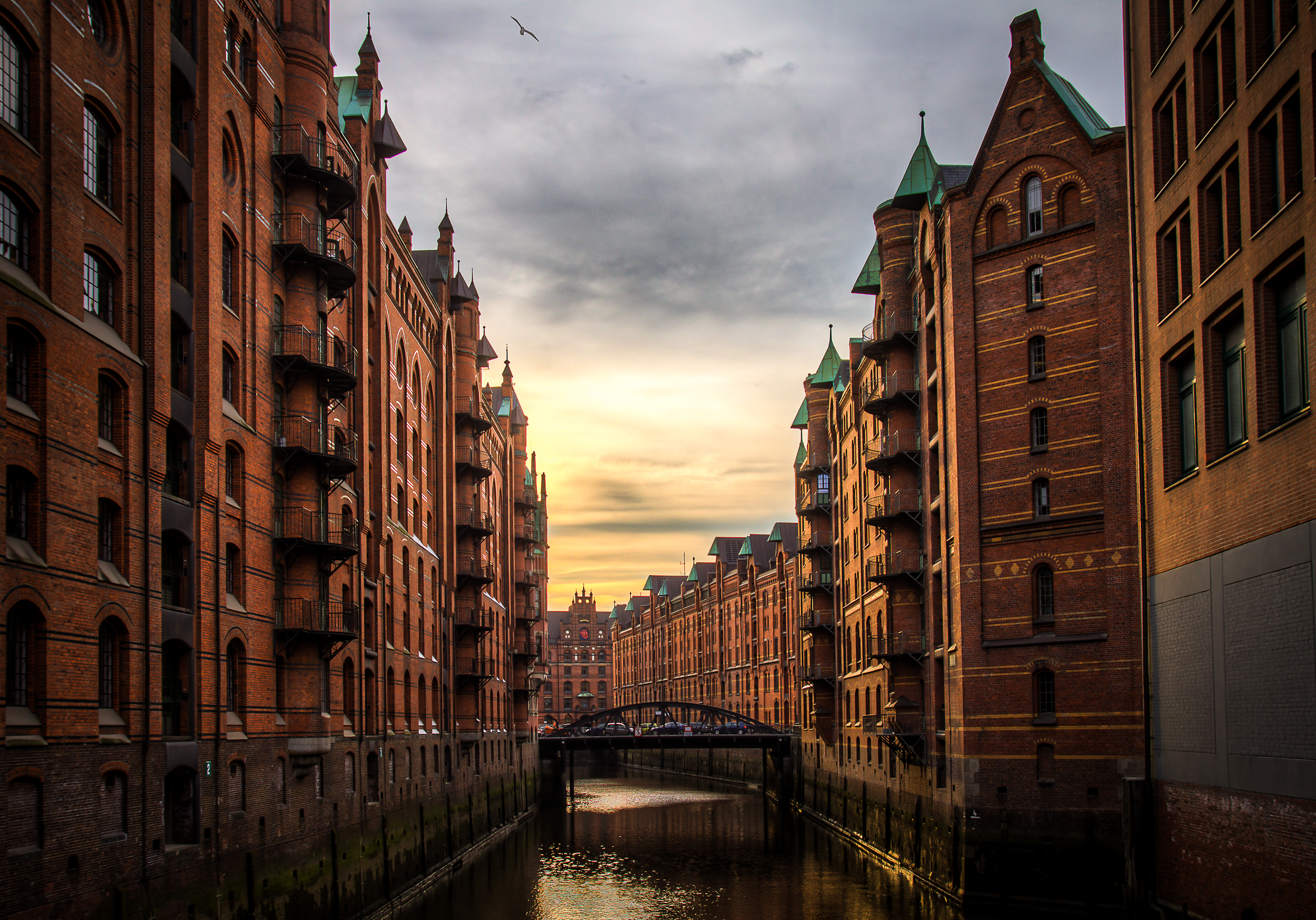
Bridges across Speicherstadt canal

The Speicherstadt is a major tourist attraction in Hamburg and is the focus of most of the harbor tours. There are several museums, like the Deutsches Zollmuseum (German Customs Museum), Miniatur Wunderland (a model railway), and the Hamburg Dungeon. The Afghan Museum was also located here, but closed in 2012.

Some of the buildings retain their original use as warehouses. As of 2005, the companies in the Speicherstadt handled one third of the world's oriental rug production, and other goods including cocoa, coffee, tea, spices, maritime equipment, and electronics.

== See also ==
- Mortzenhaus

== Bibliography ==
- Batz, M. (2002). "Urbane Light Germany Speicherstadt, Hamburg, the largest historical warehouse complex in the world, has become a softly-glowing night-time panorama". International Lighting Review (12): 14–19. OCLC 193350885.
- Lawrenz, Dierk; von Borstel, Christiane (2008). Die Hamburger Speicherstadt (in German). Freiburg, Br: EK-Verlag. ISBN 978-3-88255-893-7.
- Meyn, Boris (2003). Die rote Stadt: ein historischer Kriminalroman (in German). Reinbek: Rowohlt. ISBN 978-3-499-23407-1. A historical detective story.
- Lange, Ralf; Hampel, Thomas (2004). Speicherstadt und HafenCity: zwischen Tradition und Vision (in German). Hamburg: Elbe-und-Flut-Ed., Hampel und Hettchen. ISBN 978-3-7672-1440-8.
