= Vishwananda =

Neo-Hindu religious leader

Paramahamsa Sri Swami Vishwananda
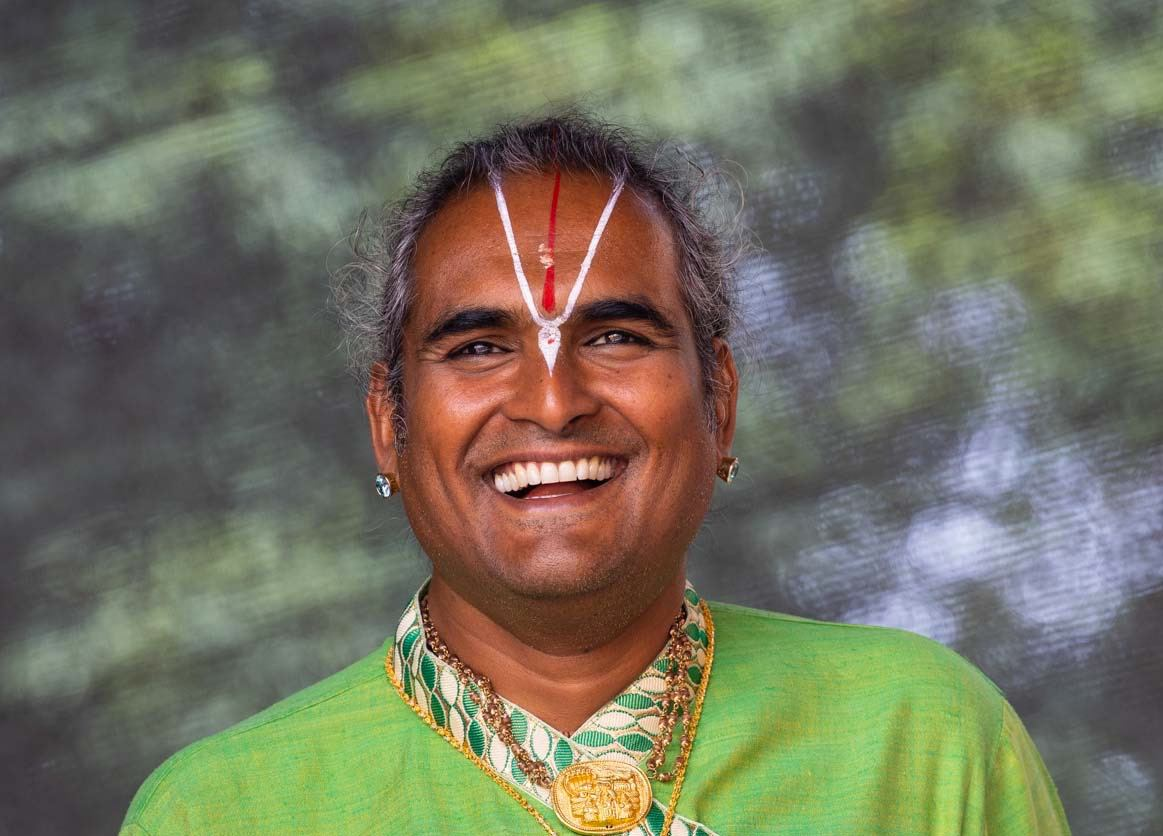
- Vishwananda in 2019
- Title: Guru, Spiritual Master

Personal life
- Born: Mahadeosingh Komalram; June 13, 1978 (age 48) Beau Bassin-Rose Hill, Mauritius
- Known for: Systematizing Atma Kriya Yoga; founding Bhakti Marga
- Other name: Paramahamsa Sri Swami Vishwananda
- Website: paramahamsavishwananda.com • bhaktimarga.org

Religious life
- Religion: Hinduism
- Order: Vaishnavism
- Founder of: Bhakti Marga
- Philosophy: Vishishtadvaita
- School: Bhakti Yoga / Atma Kriya Yoga
- Sect: Hari Bhakta Sampradāya

Religious career
- Organization: Bhakti Marga

Vishwananda (born Mahadeosingh 'Visham' Komalram in 1978), known to followers as Paramahamsa Sri Swami Vishwananda (IAST: Paramahāṁsa Śrī Svāmī Viśvānanda), is a Mauritian neo-Hindu religious leader. He is the founder of Bhakti Marga, a neo-Hindu organization. His main ashram is in the small village of Springen (Heidenrod) in the Taunus, Germany, and teaches his own version of kriya yoga called Atma Kriya Yoga.

By the end of 2022 Bhakti Marga had around 10,000 followers and between 30 and 50 ashrams worldwide. By the end of 2023 Vishwananda had around 50,000 followers, which includes 450 initiated male and female Brahmacharis, as well as 50 male and female Swamis and Rishis. The order is rooted in the cultural tradition of India and sees itself as an offshoot of Sanatana Dharma, an "eternal religion".

== Life ==
Vishwananda was born on 13 June 1978 into a Hindu Brahmin family (originated in Bihar) in Beau Bassin-Rose Hill, Mauritius. He entered samadhi for the first time at the age of 14. Samadhi is described as a profound state of meditation marked by total union with God.

After finishing his secondary education, he became a spiritual master at the age of 19 and soon after made his first journey to Europe. Since 1998 he was invited to Switzerland and England, and later to Germany, Poland, South Africa, Portugal and other countries. Around the turn of the century, he was baptized in Switzerland and married.

In 2004, he purchased a property in the small village of Steffenshof in Hunsrück, Rhineland-Palatinate, and expanded into an ashram. There, in July 2005, he established the organisation Bhakti Marga.

Since 2005, Vishwananda has been traveling across the globe, sharing his vision of meditation, which embraces the belief that all religions follow a unifying path rooted in love and spirituality.

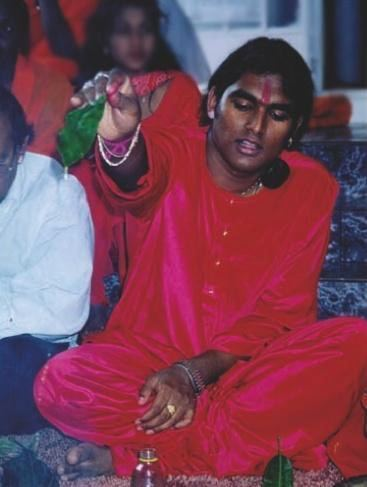
Young Vishwananda engaged in prayers

In 2008 he acquired the former conference and seminar house of the "ver.di" trade union in Springen, a larger property near the Rhine-Main area.

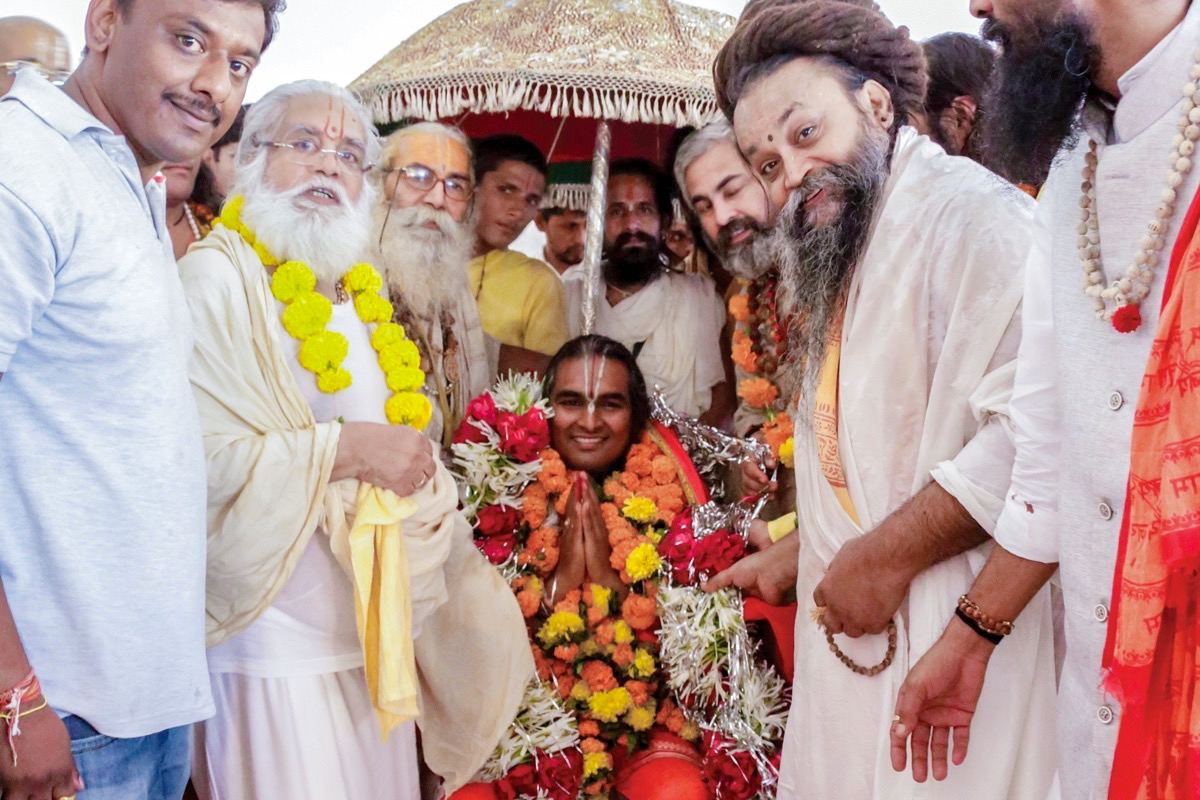
Mahamandaleshwara initiation of Vishwananda

In September 2015 he was granted the title Mahamandaleshwara by Nirmohi Akhada, the first guru outside of India to be awarded the title.

On July 11, 2015, a peace pole and a certificate were conveyed to Swami Vishwananda. According to May Peace Prevail on Earth International, Vishwananda was honored for his outstanding accomplishments for world peace over the last 20 years.

On July 2, 2016, he received the Bharat Gaurav Award, which honors Indian nationals.

On July 24, 2021, he established the Hari Bhakta Sampradaya.

== Philosophy ==
The teaching of Vishwananda combines components of Hindu traditions with influences of other religions, especially Eastern Orthodox Christianity. Since roughly around 2020, a stronger shift towards Vaishnavism has been noticeable, without complete disposal of the Christian elements.

Followers of Vishwananda claim that he can perform miracles like the materialization of jewelry or stigmata. Officially, this is neither denied nor confirmed by Bhakti Marga.

According to a follower of Vishwananda, the Hindu religion is open and embraces all paths in the world. It is based on yoga, a term that means 'union of the soul with the divine'. It embraces all ways to realise this union. According to the follower, Vishwananda does not proclaim to possess a single truth, but speaks of the existence of one truth and of many masters, each of whom reveals it in a different way.

According to the pacifist organisation May Peace Prevail on Earth International, Vishwananda "gives people access to a very personal experience with the Divine, regardless of culture, gender or age"

== Spiritual practices ==
=== Darshan ===
Vishwananda travels around the world where he gives "darshans" (blessings), some of them to thousands of people. According to a person involved in the organization of his events, he has conducted 331 darshans in 46 countries and 220 cities, and has provided blessings to more than 133,000 persons. Some darshans can last up to 17 hours. During these events there is singing of Bhajans, the guru gives lectures, and touches his followers at the third eye as a form of shaktipat and distributes vibhuti.

=== Atma Kriya Yoga ===
This practice encompasses a variety of techniques, including breathing exercises for full-body balance, as well as meditation and concentration methods. The practice is supposed to purify the mind, body, and spirit in order to move closer to God. Rui Patrício, the goalkeeper of the Portuguese national team, practises Atma Kriya Yoga as taught by Vishwananda. Followers of Bhakti Marga claim that the practice was taught to Vishwananda by the mythological guru Mahavatar Babaji.

== Controversies ==
In 2001, Vishwananda and two former members of Bhakti Marga stole relics from 25 churches and monasteries in Switzerland during a tour. Such relics included the remains of bones believed to be of Mother Mary and Saint Brother Klaus. The case was held in 2003, after one of the culprits voluntarily reported herself to the police. The case was brought before the Baselland Criminal Court in Liestal. Vishwananda did not appear at the hearing due to a tour in America and sent apologies for his absence. The two ex-disciples who were at the court spoke about their "psychological dependence and the manipulative skills of the guru". They also claimed that it was Vishwananda's order to collect as many relics as possible for "an imminent relic war and the end of the world by black magic", and had convinced them that the theft was by "God's will". The court sentenced Vishwananda to four months' suspended prison sentence for damage to property and disruption of religious freedom. The 48-year-old woman from Berne received a suspended fine of 3,500 francs, and the 29-year-old woman from Zurich received a fine of 400 francs. Most of the bones, which were in Mauritius and in a French monastery, were taken over to the diocese of Basel, and returned to the places of origin.

=== Allegations of misconduct ===
Former followers accuse the guru of sexual activities with around 15 pupils, including adolescents. In at least two cases, these are said to have involved rape. Cult experts from the Evangelische Zentralstelle für Weltanschauungsfragen reported sexual incidents occurring in a grey area between voluntary consent and enforced obedience to the guru. Followers were said to have been psychologically and emotionally manipulated. This led, in 2008, to more than half of the followers leaving the community, partly because Vishwananda’s activities conflicted with the community’s self-imposed celibacy.

In January 2022, Hessischer Rundfunk (HR), a regional broadcast arm of German state broadcaster ARD, released a TV documentary and a podcast series in which Vishwananda was accused of sexual coercion and power abuse. Vishwananda denied all the accusations and sought injunctions at the regional court of Hamburg.

The court ruled in favor of Vishvananda, issuing that there was 'a lack of evidence' to broadcast suspicions of sexual misconduct. However, the court also ruled that some key elements of HR’s reporting, including allegations that Vishwananda sought sexual contact with young men and that Bhakti Marga had totalitarian structures, were legally permissible to report under German press law. As a result of the rulings, the TV show was temporarily removed from the ARD Mediathek platform. The podcast series was partially revised and shortened. The HR also filed an appeal.The Hessischer Rundfunk alleged that an identifiable follower of Paramahamsa Vishwananda had tried to commit suicide after suffering sexual abuse, without verifying with the alleged victim if the allegation was actually true. The follower in question denied any such abuse or suicide attempt ever occurred and took legal action against HR, obtaining injunctions about the misreporting about him.

The HR appealed against the orders issued to the Hanseatisches Oberlandesgericht, submitting, among other things, statutory declarations from the interviewees. The court ruled in favor of the broadcaster on various points. Hessischer Rundfunk saw this as a success and announced that it would take further legal action. All six episodes of the podcasts are back online due to the ruling, although some have been severely abridged. The TV documentary is not available as of April 2025.

== Selected books ==
- Vishwananda, S. S. (2012). Just Love: The Essence of Everything. Bhakti Event Gmbh. ISBN 978-3940381194.
- Vishwananda, P. S. S. (2019). Bhagavad Gita Essentials. Bhakti Marga Publications. ISBN 978-3963430473.
- Vishwananda, P. S. S. (2023). Nārada-bhakti-sūtra: Commentary on the Perfection of Devotion. Bhakti Marga Publications. ISBN 978-3963430985.
