= Bhakti Marga =

Bhakti Marga (भक्ति मार्ग, path of bhakti) may refer to:

- Bhakti Marga (organisation), a Hindu organisation
- Bhakti yoga, a sprititual path or practice within Hinduism
