= Bhakti Marga (organisation) =

Neo-Hindu group based in Germany

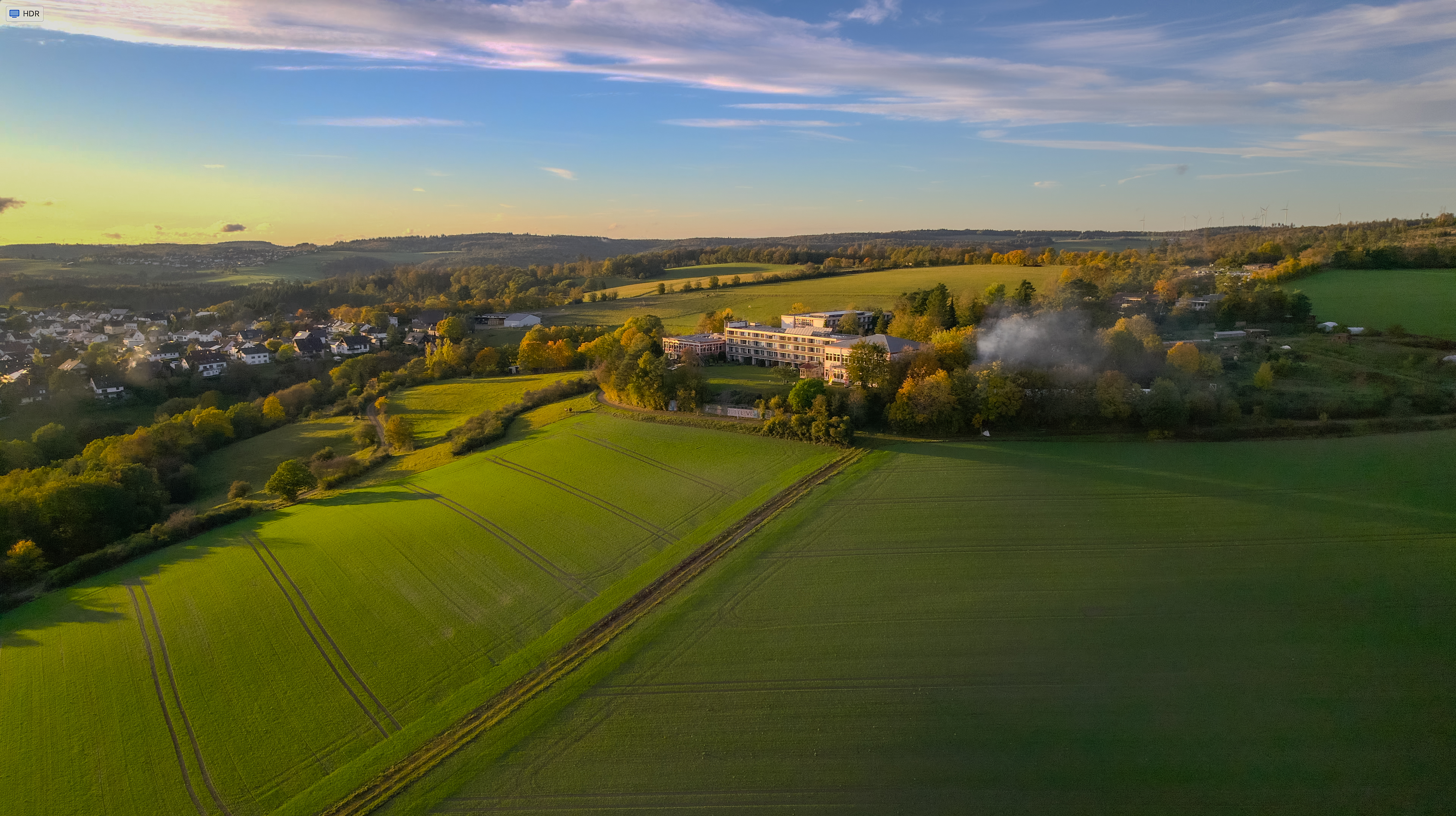
- Shree Peetha Nilaya, the main headquarters and ashram of Bhakti Marga in Heidenrod, Hesse, Germany.
- Formation: 13 June 2005 (21 years ago)
- Founder: Vishwananda
- Type: Religious organization
- Legal status: Foundation
- Purpose: Promotion of devotional (bhakti) practices and Hindu spirituality
- Headquarters: Shree Peetha Nilaya, Heidenrod, Hesse, Germany
- Coordinates: 50.143921°N 7.992129°E
- Region served: Worldwide
- Members: ~80,000 (self-declared, 2025)
- Affiliations: Vishishtadvaita; Kriya Yoga school; Warkari; Shaktism; Shaivism; Sri Vaishnavism; Sant Tradition (Hinduism)
- Website: www.bhaktimarga.org

Bhakti Marga is a neo-Hindu organisation founded by Mauritian-born guru Paramahamsa Sri Swami Vishwananda. It was established on 13 June 2005 in Frankfurt, Germany. Its main headquarters is located in Heidenrod, Hesse, Germany. It views itself as being part of a new tradition founded by Vishwananda, the Hari Bhakta Sampradaya, which represents a combination of certain Vaishnava, Shaiva and Shakta philosophies. The followers not only adhere to multiple sets of Hindu scriptures but also predominantly on the "personality of Paramahamsa Vishwananda", similar to the Sant tradition.

== History ==
Bhakti Marga means "Path of Devotion". Hari means 'God' (more specifically Vishnu), Bhakta means 'devotees' and Sampradaya means 'lineage of teachings'. The sampradaya has been viewed as a combination of the teachings of various vedantic saints, such as Mahavatar Babaji, Ramanujacharya and Chaitanya Mahaprabhu, including other Hindu denominations.

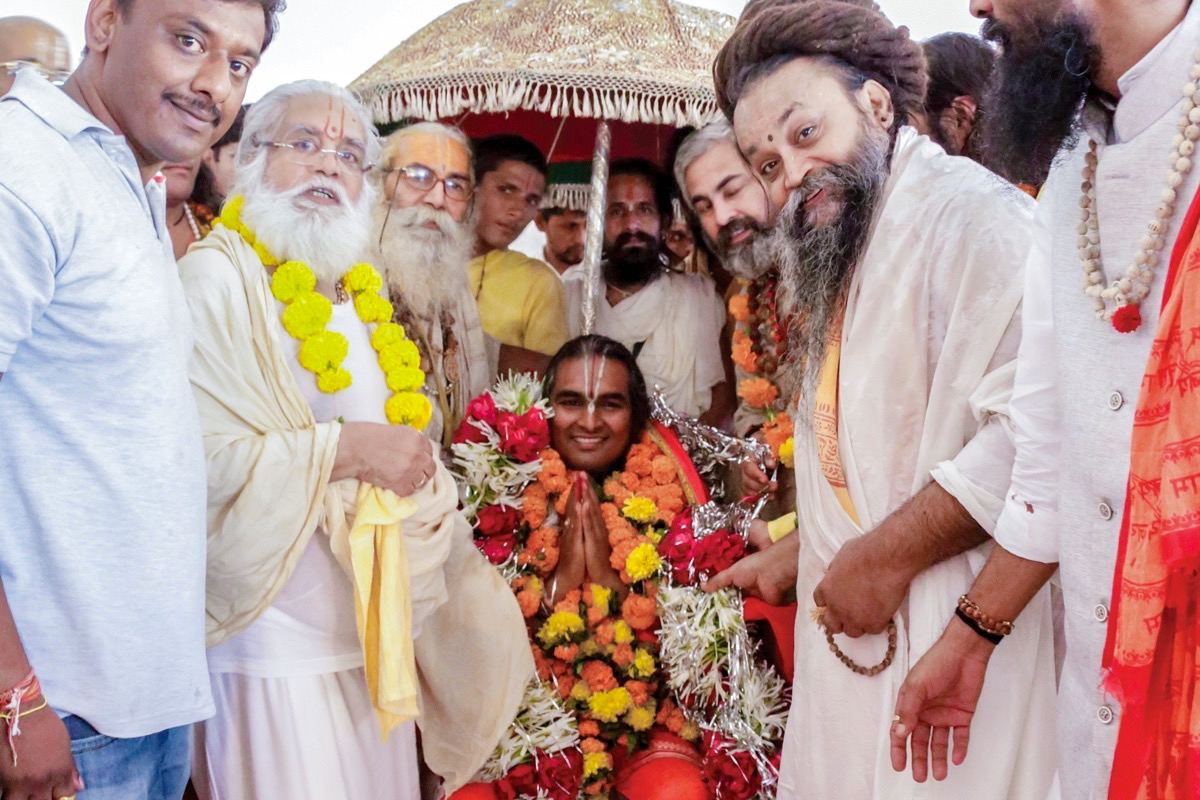
Vishwananada receives the title Mahamandaleshwara by Nirmohi Akhada, which makes him the second guru outside of India to be awarded the title.

Vishwananda arrived in the West in the year of 2004 and settled in a house in Steffenshof, Germany, with a small group of followers. The group held their activities at a center in the Hunsrück region (Steffenshof), but this later became inadequate to contain them as the followers grew in numbers. The members then found a new place – an old conference center equipped with facilities including seminar rooms, guest rooms and swimming pool. The center was later converted into a temple. He later established the organisation on 13 June 2005 at the age of 27.

By 2018, the movement claimed that it had between 30 and 50 centers or temples worldwide, some of which were rather small. This number soon increased, with the movement being present in over 80 countries by 2020. By the end of 2022 the organisation had around 10,000 followers. By the end of 2023, Bhakti Marga experienced an increase of up to around 50,000 followers, which included 450 initiated male and female Brahmacharis, as well as more than 50 male and female Swamis and Rishis. Vishwananda was the first non-Indian guru with foreign disciples allowed to join India's official Kumbh Mela Shahi Sangam bathing procession of Sadhus and Akharas. The first version of the logo of Bhakti Marga featured the Hindu 'Om' alongside symbols from Abrahamic traditions, including a cross, a small Islamic crescent, and the Star of David. This design has since been replaced by a logo depicting a white horse rearing from a lotus. According to Martin J. Haigh, the new symbol resonates with themes of transformation and new beginnings, and signifies the anticipated arrival of Kalki, the 10th, prophesied avatar of Sri Vishnu.

In Portugal, in March 2024, another ashram of Bhakti Marga, Ashram Pundarikaksha Rukmini Dham, was inaugurated in Cercal, Cadaval, serving as the organization's headquarters in Portugal, with five other temples located in Lisbon, Porto, Braga, Viseu, and Caranguejeira (previously there was another one also in Leiria). In line with its mission of service and ecological awareness, Bhakti Marga launched the "Plantar Amor" initiative, planting 108 native trees on December 6 as part of its second edition; more than 200 trees have already been planted, with a goal to surpass 1,000, emphasizing ecosystem service as a core value.

== Motto and principles ==
The core of Vishwanandas teaching is the omniprensent divine love (Bhakti), which everyone can find within themself. To access this divine love, a salvation-bringing guru is needed. The teachings are based on a neohinduistically oriented doctrine of the unity of all religions.

Every Bhakti Marga ashram has at least one temple, which in turn often contains several idols representing deities. In addition to various Hindu deities, Vaishnava and non-vaishnava, Babaji and Ramanuja are worshipped as gurus in the main temple in Springen. The main deities in Sri Vaishnava are Narayana and Lakshmi, who are also worshiped in the Bhakti Marga temples. However, many other deities are also worshiped, some of which belong to the Vaishnava pantheon (Radha and Krishna), but some of them do not. This worship of non-vaishnava gurus and deities, like Shiva and Durga, distinguishes Bhakti Marga from other Vaishnava traditions, such as Shri Vaishnava, or Gaudiya Vaishnava, which is known in western countries mainly through the Hare Krishna movement. Bhakti Marga initially incorporated a syncretistic system of Hinduism with Christianity in their temples, including having crosses, icons, and the figure of Jesus. Since roughly around 2020, the organisation has reoriented itself towards Vaishnavism, even though some Christian elements have been retained.

Bhakti Marga representatives have stated that the organization does not actively seek to convert individuals, instead focusing on being a part of the communities where its temples and centers are located.

== Religious practices ==
Bhakti Marga devotees follow Sadhana or 'spiritual practice', which can be carried out in any form or sequence. The spiritual practices are divided in 4 arms: Rituals, Meditation, Devotional Arts and Knowledge. Apart from the Bhagavad Gita, the Srimad Bhagavatam and the Guru Gita are attributed primary authority in the organisation. Devotional arts are also seen as ways to express bhakti towards Hari, such as painting, Sri Yantra composition, singing, dancing and theatre plays.

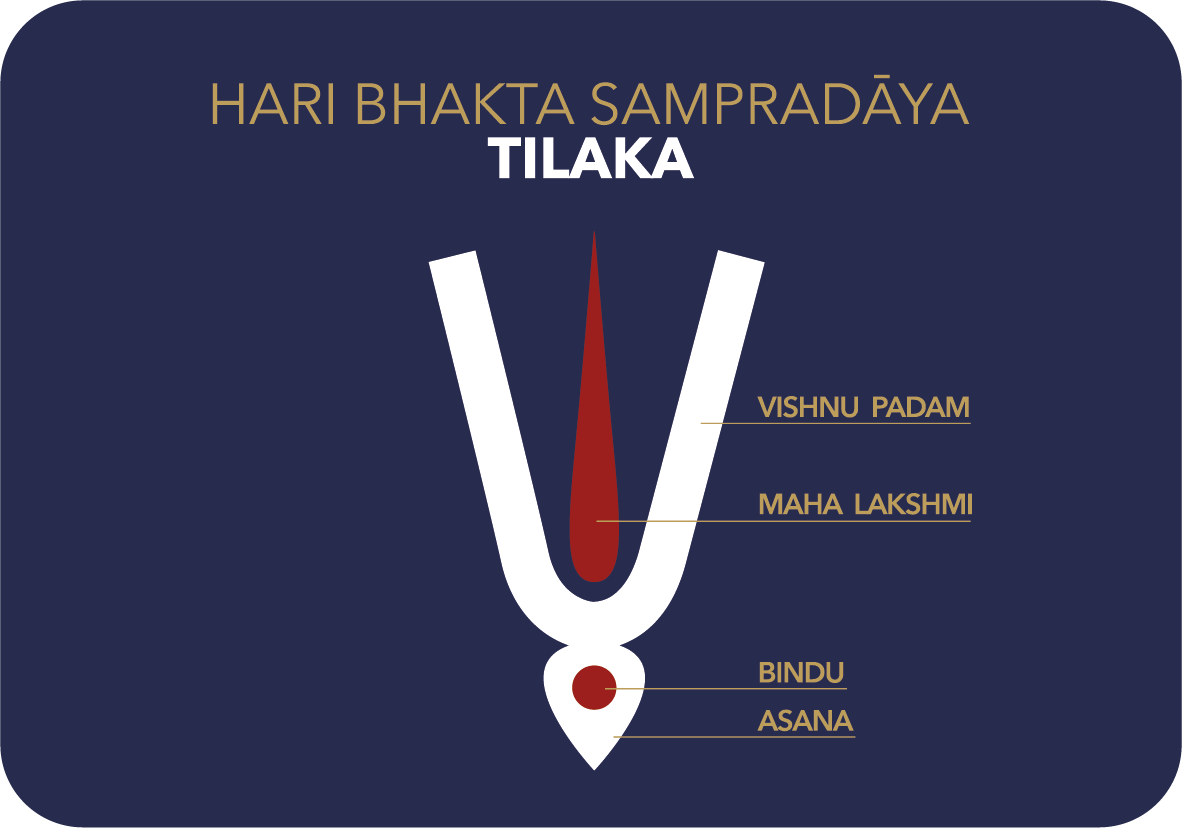
The Tilak used by followers in Bhakti Marga

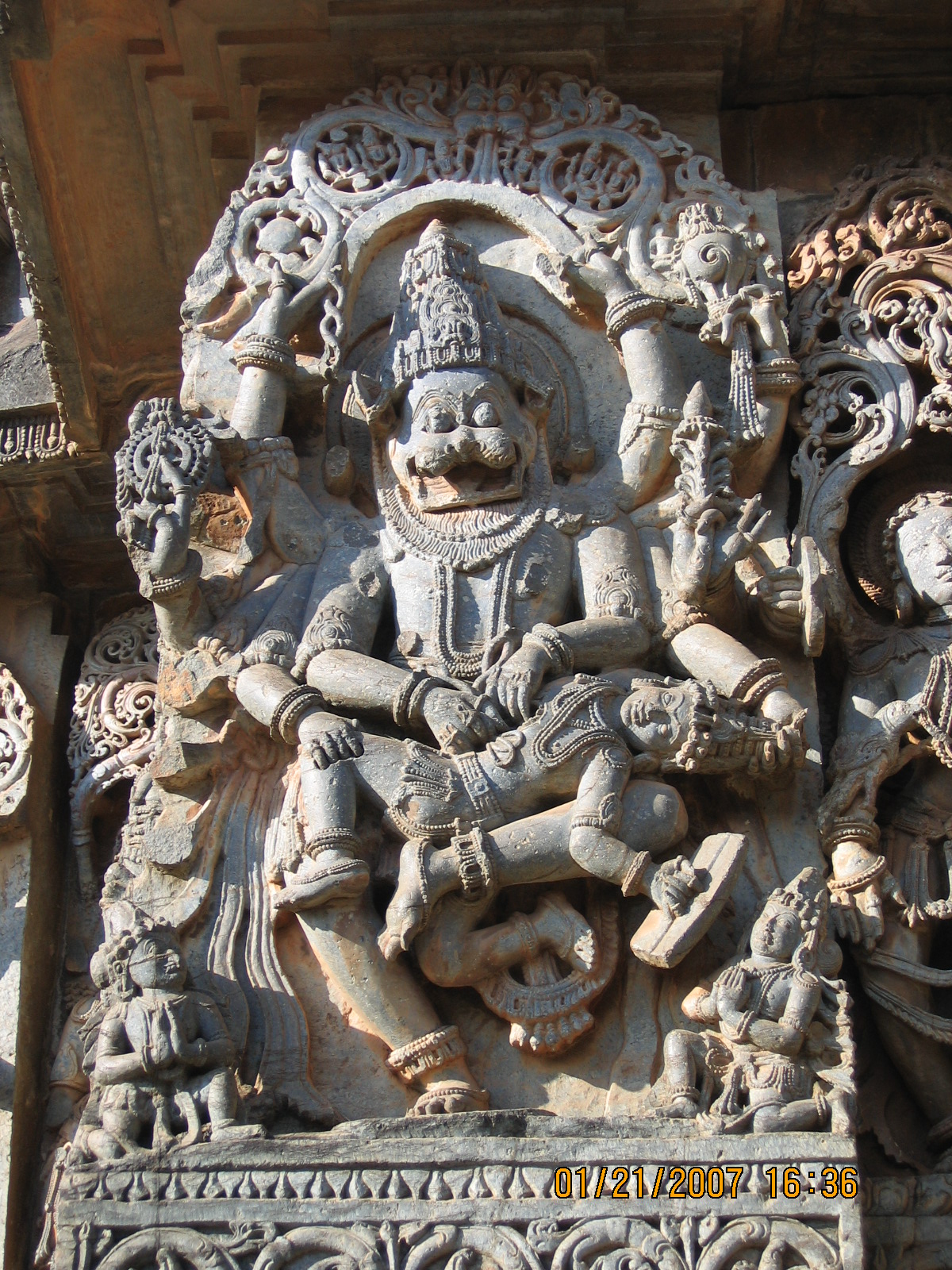
Narasimha, an avatar of Vishnu, is prominently worshipped in various Bhakti Marga ashrams

=== Atma Kriya Yoga ===
Vishwananda is the founder of Atma Kriya Yoga, a meditation practice that aims to support spiritual development through a combination of techniques, including breathing exercises, meditation, and concentration methods.

=== Celebrated festivals ===
Bhakti Marga organizes events for key Hindu festivals, including Maha Shivaratri, Navaratri, Krishna Janmashtami, and Narasimha Chaturthi.

Since 2015, Bhakti Marga has held a large, multi-day festival in Germany every year, the Just Love Festival, which attracts up to 3,000 visitors. The duration of the festival varies between three and ten days. During the festival, various spiritual music bands from different countries play, mainly bhajans and kirtans, but these can be interpreted differently, such that Sanskrit hymns could also be rapped. The event is usually in the summer, the focus of the festival is Guru Purnima, a Hindu festival held every year in honor of the guru, spiritual or academic, on a full moon day. The festival also includes exhibitions, a bazaar, a vegan restaurant, and lectures or workshops led by Bhakti Marga members.

=== Darshan ===
During his travels, Vishwananda gives "darshans" (blessings), some of them to thousands of people. Some darshans can last up to 17 hours.

=== Initiation ===
Followers of Bhakti Marga who wish to be formally initiated into the sampradaya are expected to adhere to certain religious practices for a minimum of two years. These practices typically include maintaining a vegetarian diet and abstaining from meat, eggs, and fish; avoiding intoxicants such as alcohol, tobacco, and recreational drugs; participating regularly in Bhakti Marga activities, either in person or online; performing daily japa (mantra repetition); studying Hindu scriptures such as Bhagavad Gita Essentials or Shreemad Bhagavad Gita: The Song of Love; reading at least one book by Paramahamsa Vishwananda (excluding the Bhagavad Gita commentary); completing a Devotee Course to learn concepts necessary for formal initiation; and receiving approval from a senior member, such as a swami/ni or rishi/ka.

=== Vestments and roles within the spiritual order ===
Bhakti Marga members wear long, colored robes as part of their traditional attire, which reflect their roles within the community. Swamis, who are spiritual leaders responsible for spreading the teachings and guiding communities, wear orange robes. Those who are in the process of studying and deepening their understanding of the teachings, such as brahmacharis and brahmacharinis, wear yellow. The organization's rishis/rishikas wear red and carry out the mission of disseminating the organization's teachings and are regarded as "swamis-in-training." Both groups receive their initiation directly from Paramahamsa Vishwananda. Their clothing is usually in the form of kurtas, dhotis, and saris.

== Ashrams ==
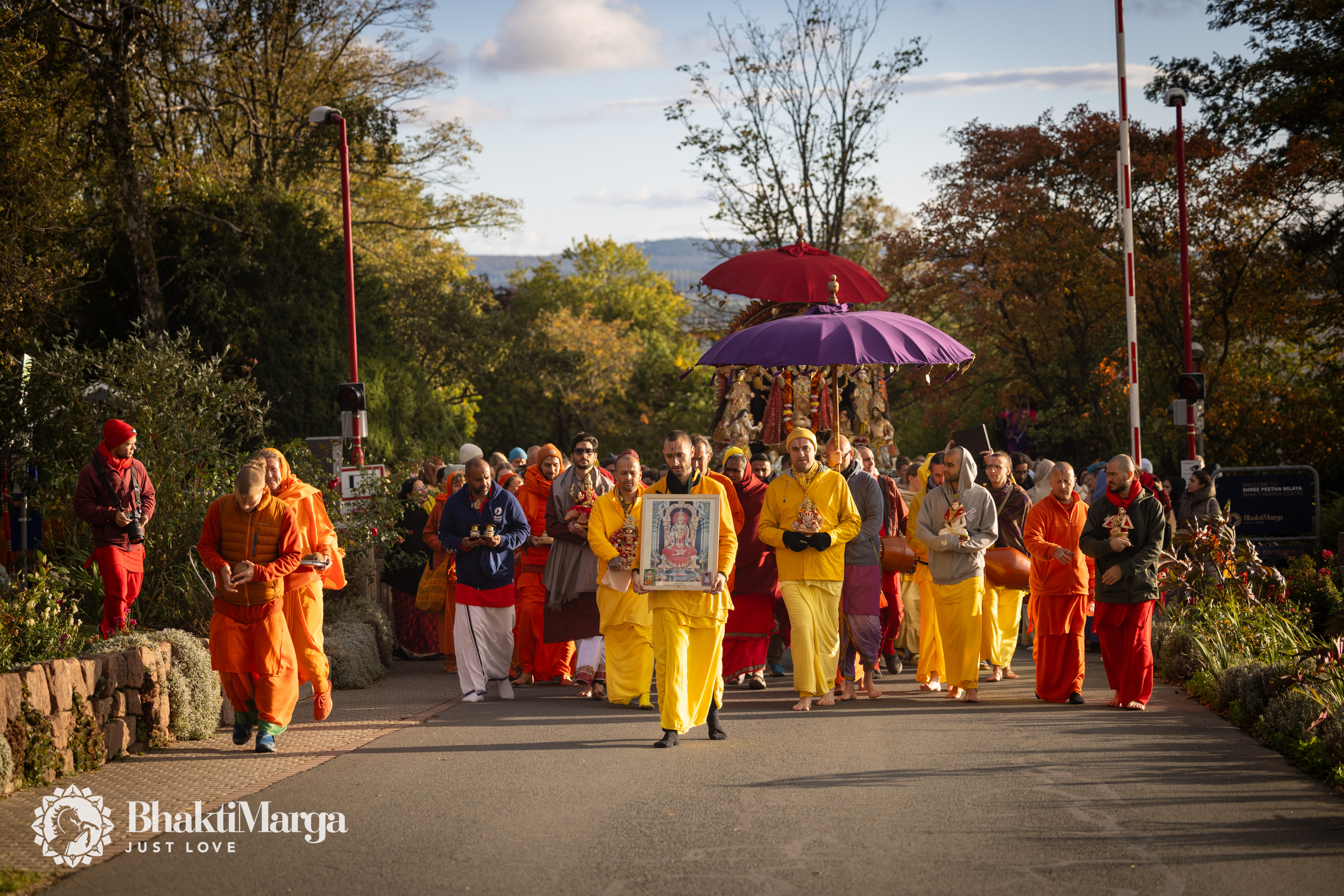
A procession which includes the various members of Bhakti Marga wearing different coloured robes, during the first day of Navaratri, that was celebrated at Shree Peetha Nilaya.

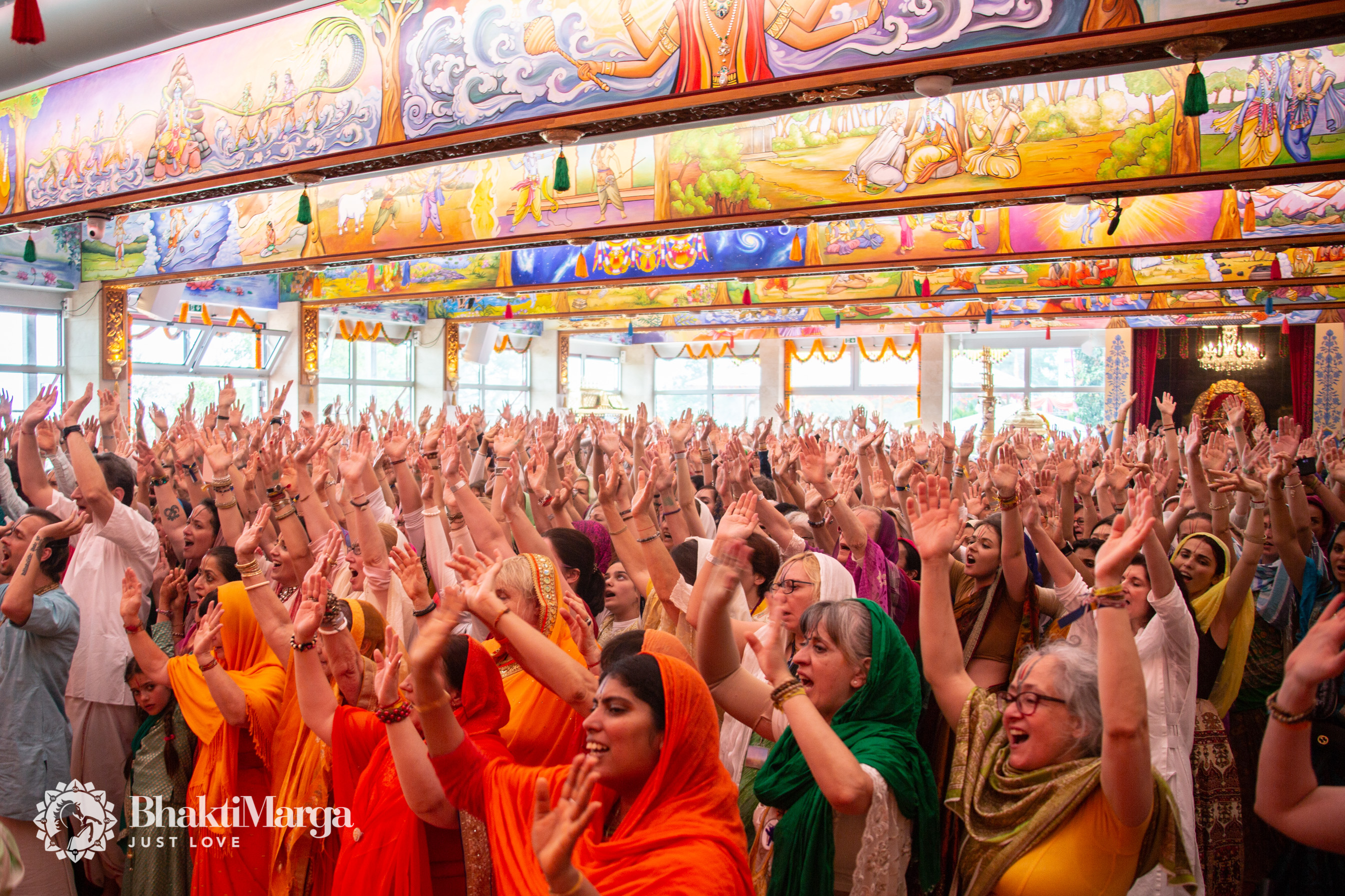
The Bhuthabhrteshwarnath Mandir inauguration took place over five days with ancient Vedic rituals in June 2018, which was attended by distinguished guests, acharyas, and Bhakti Marga followers

The movement claims to have between 30 and 50 centres or temples worldwide, some of them rather small, which soon increased to being present in over 80 countries in 2020.

In November 2020 it became known that Bhakti Marga in Kirchheim in the Hersfeld-Rotenburg district of Hesse wants to set up its Hindu Germany center in the area of the Seepark Kirchheim holiday complex, which includes its own lake.

In January 2022 Bhakti Marga purchased a former Catholic Church in West Elmira, New York, the former Our Lady of Lourdes parish, to become its first ashram and temple in America.

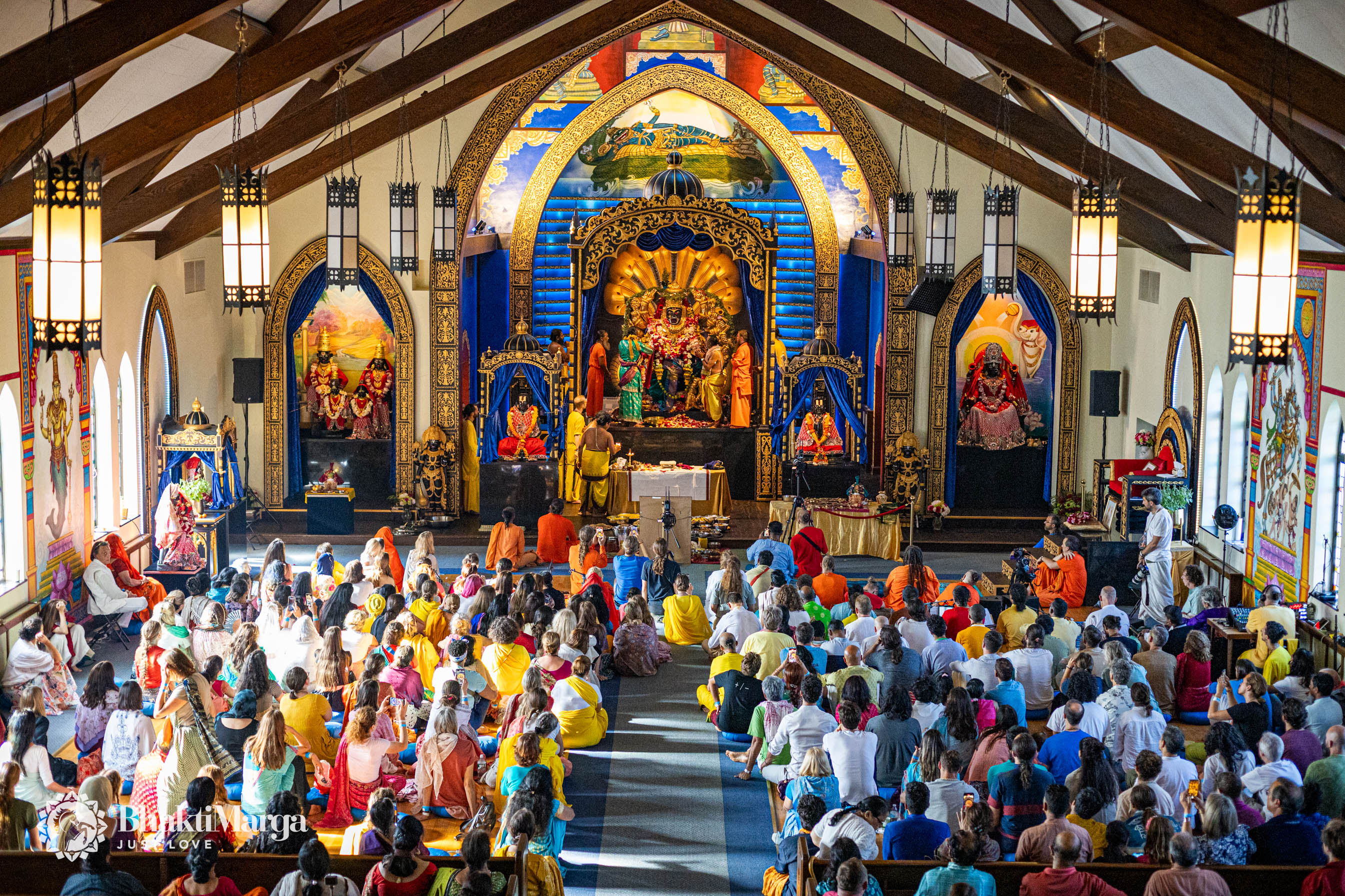
The Paranitaya Narasimha Temple in Elmira, Chemung County, New York, USA, was inaugurated with four days of Vedic rituals, with kirtan, yajna, abishekam, and vegan food. On the third night, Paramahamsa Vishwananda gave darshan to a full house.

=== Museum ===
The Saints Of India Museum, located in Shree Nilaya Peetha in Germany, has a collection of over 1,300 Hindu relics, sacred texts, and artefacts belonging to hundred of saints who have contributed to Indian religious traditions.

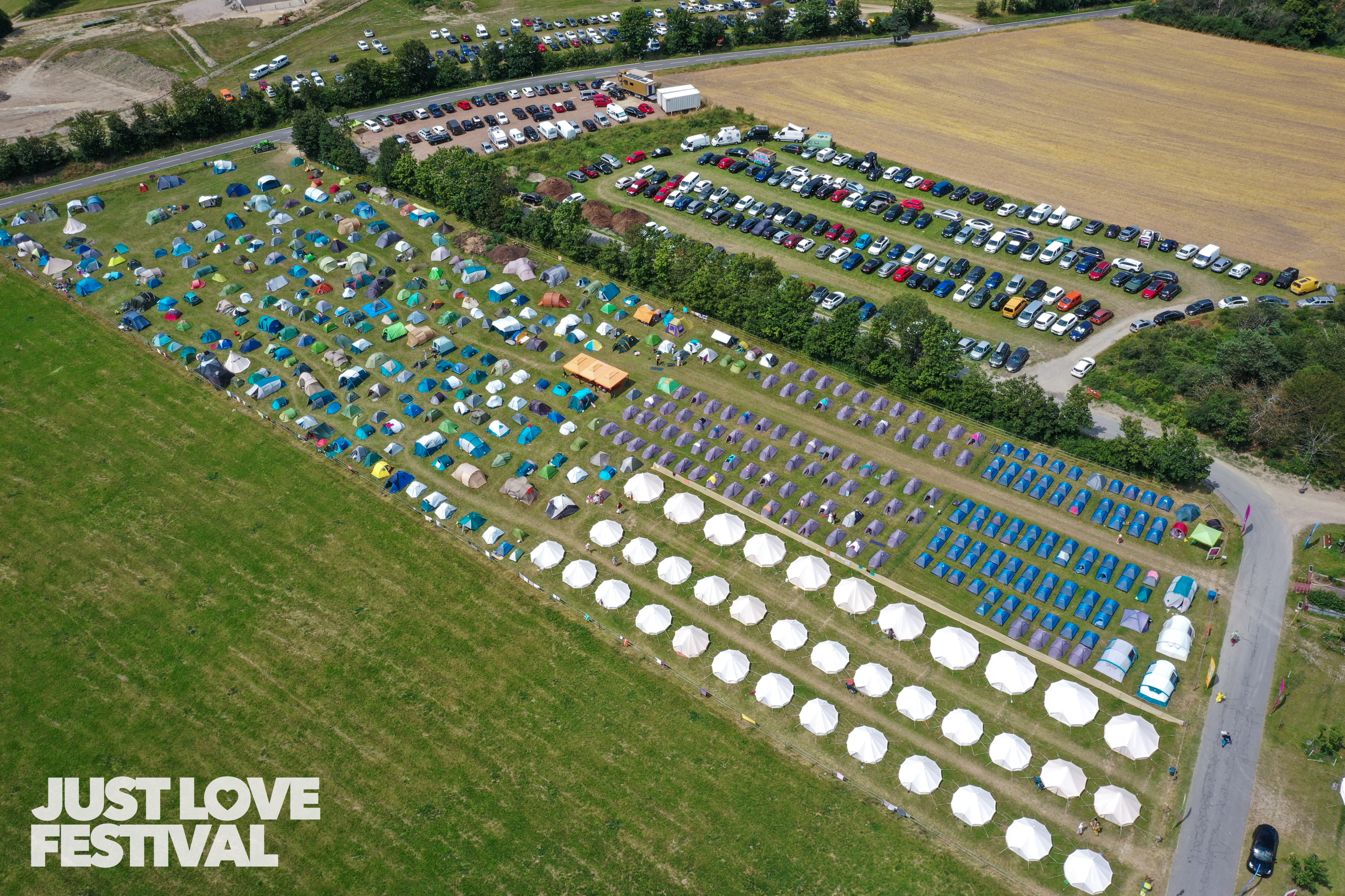
A drone view from 19 July 2024 of tents and campervans used by the participants of the Just Love Festival.

== Controversies and criticism ==
=== Theft of Christian relics ===
In 2001, the Swiss newspaper Tages-Anzeiger reported that Vishwananda as well as two former members of Bhakti Marga stole relics from 25 churches and monasteries in Switzerland during a tour. Such relics include the remains of bones believed to be of Mother Mary and Saint Brother Klaus. The case was held in 2003, after one of the culprits voluntarily reported herself to the police. The case was brought before the Baselland Criminal Court in Liestal. Swami Vishwananda did not appear at the hearing due to a tour in America and sent apologise for his absence. The two ex-disciples who were at the court spoke about their "psychological dependence and the manipulative skills of the guru". They also claimed that it was Vishwananda's order to collect and save as many relics as possible "from being destroyed by an imminent relic war and the end of the world by black magic", and had convinced them that the theft was by "God's will".

The court sentenced Vishwananda to four months' suspended prison sentence for damage to property and disruption of religious freedom. The 48-year-old woman from Berne received a suspended fine of 3,500 francs, and the 29-year-old woman from Zurich received a fine of 400 francs. Most of the relics, which were in Mauritius and in a French monastery, were taken over to the diocese of Basel, and returned to the places of origin.

=== Activities in memorials of Nazi concentration camps ===
On 10 December 2016, Bhakti Marga held an Om chanting ritual at the Mauthausen concentration camp memorial site in Austria. The organisation described the practice as a way to bring peace and "transform negative energy" associated with places of suffering. The event received varied responses: some observers viewed it as a respectful act of remembrance, while others criticised it as a form of exploitation or relativization of the Holocaust.

On 17 March 2018, Bhakti Marga organised a similar chanting event at the Buchenwald concentration camp in Germany. In the lead-up to the event, the group faced protests from critics who argued that the ritual risked trivialising the unique historical significance of the site. The director of the Flossenbürg concentration camp memorial later stated that he had rejected a separate request by Bhakti Marga, citing concerns that the ceremony would constitute an "inappropriate manipulation of the site" and the memory of its victims.

Bhakti Marga maintains that its ceremonies are spiritual rather than political and are intended to honour victims by creating "peace and harmony." Participants typically visit the memorial museum, view educational exhibits, and engage in dialogue with local communities before performing the chanting ritual. Some Jewish leaders expressed support for the organisation's participation: Reinhard Schramm, head of the Jewish community in Thuringia, described Bhakti Marga as a partner in the fight against racism and xenophobia.

Authorities responsible for concentration camp memorials gave differing responses. In Austria, the interior ministry stated that the monuments are open to any group that respects "the dignity of the place." Willi Mernyi, chair of the Mauthausen Committee, said that he considered the event an act of respect and chose not to criticise the organisation. Rikola-Gunnar Lüttgenau, spokesperson for the Buchenwald memorial, explained that Protestant, Catholic, and Jewish groups are permitted to hold prayers at the site, and Bhakti Marga was therefore not barred from carrying out its chanting ceremony. Following an investigation, the Buchenwald memorial's management reported that Bhakti Marga had not violated any site rules. Critics of the chanting argued that framing the ritual as "purifying" or "healing" risks conflating spiritual concepts with historical remembrance, potentially diverting attention from the educational mission of Holocaust memorials. Scholars and commentators have noted that while interfaith participation can foster dialogue, spiritualising the past may unintentionally diminish the specific historical lessons of Nazi crimes.

=== Relationship with local community ===
The UK branch of Bhakti Marga reports its activities and finances through the UK Charity Commission. Filings indicate that it organizes educational events and spiritual gatherings, including programs for children at the Hari Bhakta Vidyalaya School and courses on the Bhagavad Gita and Bhakti Marga teachings.

Bhakti Marga's activities at its main ashram in the village of Springen have received mixed reactions from residents. The community has been accused of causing noise pollution due to loud chanting through the village and contributing to traffic congestion during festivals, with visitors parking cars on the street. Concerns have also been raised about the community purchasing properties, which has led to fears about the availability of housing for local residents. However, some locals and local authorities have acknowledged the group's politeness and contributions to the local economy. Bhakti Marga actively participates in village life, supports environmental initiatives like "My Village Stays Clean," and maintains close collaboration with the municipality. Bhakti Marga has also been noted for providing shelter to Ukrainian refugees.

In September 2025, the Town of Elmira Planning Board in New York State required Bhakti Marga America to conduct a full State Environmental Quality Review (SEQR) before moving forward with plans to expand its Paranitya Narasimha Temple complex in West Elmira. Bhakti Marga, which purchased the former Our Lady of Lourdes Catholic Church in 2022 and reopened it as a Hindu temple in September 2023, proposed a major expansion to include a renovated community center with an auditorium, cafeteria, kitchen, religious shop, and temporary housing for international visitors. The project drew opposition from some residents, who expressed concerns about traffic, light pollution, noise and changes to the neighborhood's character. At a public meeting, Planning Board members determined that the expansion could have a moderate to large environmental impact, prompting the requirement for a full review under New York's SEQR law. Bhakti Marga officials stated that the organization aimed to be good neighbors and was happy to comply with the additional review, adding that opposition largely came from a vocal minority of local residents.

=== Allegations of misconduct ===
In January 2022, Hessischer Rundfunk (HR), a regional broadcast arm of German state broadcaster ARD, released a TV documentary and a podcast series in which Vishwananda was accused of sexual coercion and power abuse. Vishwananda denied all the accusations and sought injunctions at the regional court of Hamburg.

The court ruled in favor of Vishvananda, issuing that there was 'a lack of evidence' to broadcast suspicions of sexual misconduct. However, the court also ruled that some key elements of HR's reporting, including allegations that Vishwananda sought sexual contact with young men and that Bhakti Marga had totalitarian structures, were legally permissible to report under German press law. As a result of the rulings, the TV show was temporarily removed from the ARD Mediathek platform. The podcast series was partially revised and shortened. The HR also filed an appeal.

The Hessischer Rundfunk alleged that an identifiable follower of Paramahamsa Vishwananda had tried to commit suicide after suffering sexual abuse, without verifying with the alleged victim if the allegation was actually true. The follower in question denied any such abuse or suicide attempt ever occurred and took legal action against HR, obtaining injunctions about the misreporting about him.

The HR appealed against the orders issued to the Hanseatisches Oberlandesgericht, submitting, among other things, statutory declarations from the interviewees. The court ruled in favor of the broadcaster on various points. Hessischer Rundfunk saw this as a success and announced that it would take further legal action. All six episodes of the podcasts are back online due to the ruling, although some have been severely abridged. The TV documentary is not available as of April 2025.

In March 2024 German infotainment show ZDF Magazin Royale aired a 21-minute segment criticising Vishwananda and Bhakti Marga, including the controversy of sexual abuses. Journalists from the Wiesbadener Kurier, a local newspaper, who engaged directly with Bhakti Marga described their experience as open and transparent, in contrast to the critical tone of the satirical broadcast. Repeated resurfacing of the accusations, was viewed as misleading and lacking journalistic integrity.

=== Links to conspiracy theorists ===
In 2022 and 2023, the German broadcaster Hessischer Rundfunk and Tagesschau reported that Bhakti Marga's headquarters in Heidenrod (Springen), Hesse, had hosted public events attended by individuals associated with Germany's Reichsbürger movement and with the Querdenker protests against pandemic restrictions. According to the coverage, conspiracy activists produced media content on the premises and used the site for networking with antisemitic and anti-democratic milieus.

A parliamentary inquiry in the Hessian Landtag raised the issue in May 2023, asking the state government whether Bhakti Marga had connections to the Reichsbürger or conspiracy-ideological scene. The government referred to existing media reports but confirmed that Bhakti Marga itself was not under observation by the Landesamt für Verfassungsschutz and that no investigations were being conducted against the group.

Civil-society monitoring initiatives have also discussed the organisation in this context. A 2023 study by MBT Hessen cited Bhakti-Marga-affiliated associations in analyses of conspiracy ideology networks. The Beratungsnetzwerk Hessen reported on public fundraising initiatives involving Bhakti-Marga-linked associations and activists from the Querdenker scene. A 2022 report in T-Online likewise documented how donations collected by Querdenker activist Bodo Schiffmann after the 2021 floods were channelled to groups including a Bhakti-Marga-affiliated association, Eine Hand hilft der anderen e.V.

Bhakti Marga and its representatives have rejected the characterisation that the organisation is linked to conspiracy networks. In statements to Tagesschau, the group's lawyer argued that individuals mentioned in press reports had acted only in a private capacity and not on behalf of the organisation. Bhakti Marga has maintained that it does not support conspiracy theories and that some gatherings cited in media coverage were organised by outside groups renting its facilities.

== See also ==
- Vishwananda
