= Akhileshwaranand Giri =

Indian ascetic and environmentalist

Mahamandeleshwar Swami Akhileshwarnand Giri

Cabinet Minister, Madhya Pradesh Government
- In office June 2018 – Incumbent

Minister of State, Madhya Pradesh Government
- In office April 2018 – Incumbent

Personal details
- Profession: Spiritual Leader, preacher

Mahamandaleshwar Swami Akhileshwaranand Giri is an Indian spiritual leader and preacher. He currently serves as the Vice-Chairman of the Madhya Pradesh Gopalan and Livestock Promotion Board and Chairman of the Executive Council of the Madhya Pradesh Cow Husbandry and Livestock Promotion Board, appointed by the Madhya Pradesh government in 2021. He is also a Cabinet Minister in Shivraj Singh Chouhan's cabinet and holds the status of Minister of State (MoS) in the Madhya Pradesh government. Additionally, he serves as the Chairman of the Madhya Pradesh State Gau Samvardhan Board (Cow Protection Board).

In 2018, Akhileshwaranand was appointed to a Narmada conservation panel set up by the state government for conservation of the Narmada River. He is a former pracharak of the Rashtriya Swayamsevak Sangh and had participated in the Ram Janmabhoomi movement.

He works for cow protection and demanded the creation of a dedicated cow ministry in the state of Madhya Pradesh. Later a cow ministry was established in the state. Swami Akhileshwaranand was given the title of Mahamandaleshwar in March 2010 by the Niranjani Akhara. Giri also served as the head of the state-level committee constituted by the Vishva Hindu Parishad (VHP) to raise funds for the construction of the Ram Mandir in Ayodhya.

== Controversies ==
Akhileshwaranand Giri made a controversial statement regarding actor Shah Rukh Khan's alleged sympathy for Pakistan amidst ongoing protests against the song Besharam Rang featured in the film Pathaan. Swami said, "if Shah Rukh Khan has sympathy for the enemy country, then he should immediately leave India and settle in Pakistan."

In April 2022, Akhileshwaranand Giri called for an immediate ban on the use of loudspeakers for Azaan or Namaz, stating his full support for the ban. Giri made these comments while speaking to the media in Jabalpur that using loudspeakers for Azaan or Namaz is not a part of traditional practice.
