= Peace pole =

Monument series advocating for world peace

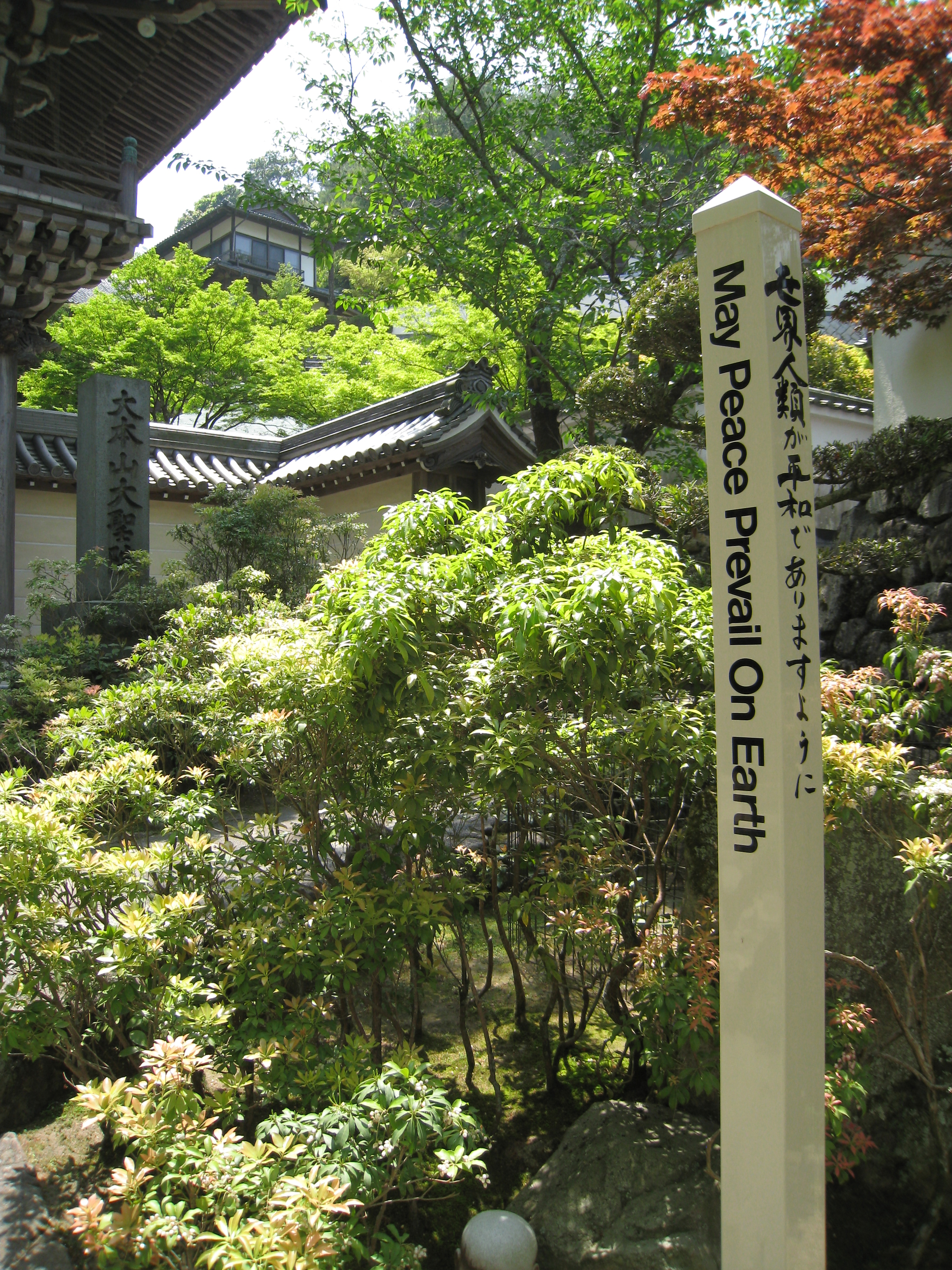
Peace pole near Hiroshima, Japan.

A peace pole(世界平和祈願柱) is a monument that displays the message "May Peace Prevail on Earth" in the language of the country where it has been placed, and usually some additional translations. The message is often called a peace prayer.

Peace poles were first thought up by Masahisa Goi(五井昌久), the founder of the Byakko Shinko Kai(白光真宏会), a religious group which he created in Japan in 1955. The group is considered an offshoot of the Seicho-no-Ie.

Goi believed that thoughts affect reality, and that the chanting of prayers was the most effective way to achieve world peace. The phrase, “May peace be upon the earth,” comes from a prayer chanted at the Hakko Shinkokai, "May peace prevail on earth / May peace be in our home and nation / May our divine mission be fulfilled / Our Guardian Spirits, Divine Lords, and Master Goi / We are very thankful for your love and guidance".

The Japanese Red Army's AIA building hostage crisis in Malaysia in 1975 had caused the worldwide impression of the Japanese to deteriorate. Therefore, Goi wanted to restore the impression of Japan and the Japanese by demonstrating to the world that they sincerely wanted peace, and he came up with the idea of the Peace Pole.

In 1976, in the last years of Goi's life, the Byakko Shinko Kai began erecting peace poles throughout Japan. Posters, leaflets, and peace poles with “Prayer for World Peace” were spread over a wide area in Japan and abroad. As the peace movement by Goi's followers was gaining momentum, He died in 1980.

The first peace poles outside Japan were constructed in 1983. Since then, more than 200,000 have been placed around the world in close to 200 countries.

Peace poles are often seen in various places in Japan, but most people do not know who erected them and for what purpose, and some find them suspicious. Some people of other religions consider the erection of the Peace Pole as part of their religious activities. Countless peace poles have been erected on the grounds of the Byakko Shinko Kai's headquarters.

The peace pole project today is promoted by The World Peace Prayer Society as well as other groups and individuals. The World Peace Prayer Society was founded by Masami Saionzi(西園寺昌美), the second president of the Byakko Shinko Kai.Yoshida 2019, p. 304 The Goi Peace Foundation(五井平和財団), chaired by Masami Saionji, is a sister organization of The World Peace Prayer Society and has presented peace poles to international organizations and dignitaries from various countries.

Peace poles have been placed in such notable locations as the north magnetic pole, the Hiroshima Peace Memorial, the site of the Egyptian pyramids in Giza, and the Aiki Shrine in Iwama, Japan. Peace poles are commonly installed at high-profile public gathering places, such as community parks or near the entrances of churches or schools. In one case, a garden, created for a wedding, was designed around the peace pole that was its centerpiece. The Republic of Molossia, a micronation, has a peace pole in eight languages. The University of California, Los Angeles has a limestone peace pole with 14 languages directly in front of Kerckhoff Hall.

The initial inspiration for planting a peace pole often is as a response to a local historic hate crime, incident or issue. The world's second-largest peace pole, at 52 feet (16 m), is located in Janesville, Wisconsin, at the site of a 1992 KKK rally (Saturday, May 30). Another of the largest peace poles in the world, as measured in tons, is the granite peace pole in Beech Acres Park near Cincinnati, Ohio, inspired by hate literature left in the driveways of Jewish residents.

In September 2016, the World Peace Prayer Society and the Little Free Library project announced a collaboration to offer a new peace pole library structure. It features the standard peace pole message of peace – "May Peace Prevail on Earth" – in a six-foot library. Some of these new libraries were installed at locations significant to the civil rights movement, such as the 16th Street Baptist Church in Birmingham, Alabama.

== Gallery ==
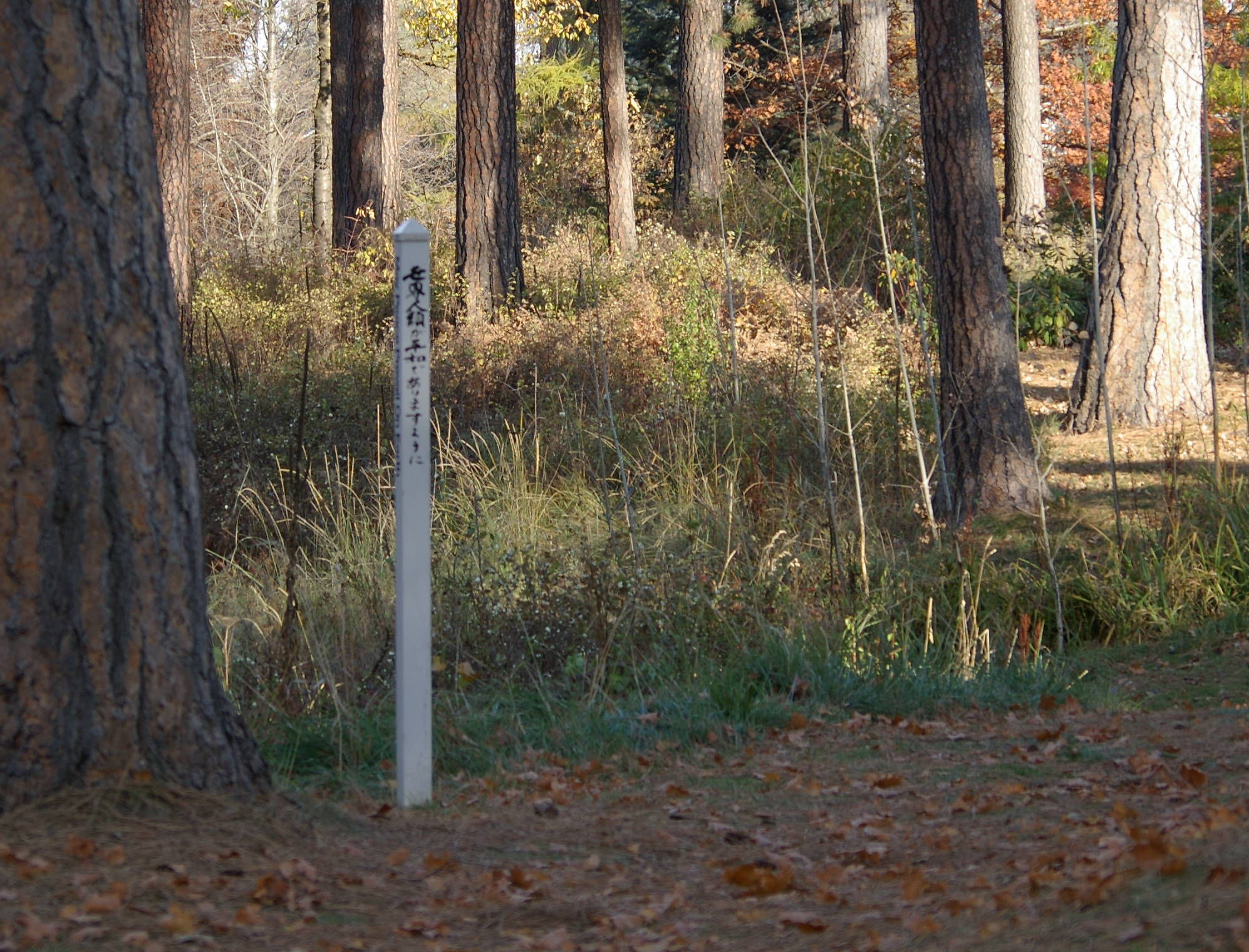
Peace pole in Spokane's Finch Arboretum, Washington

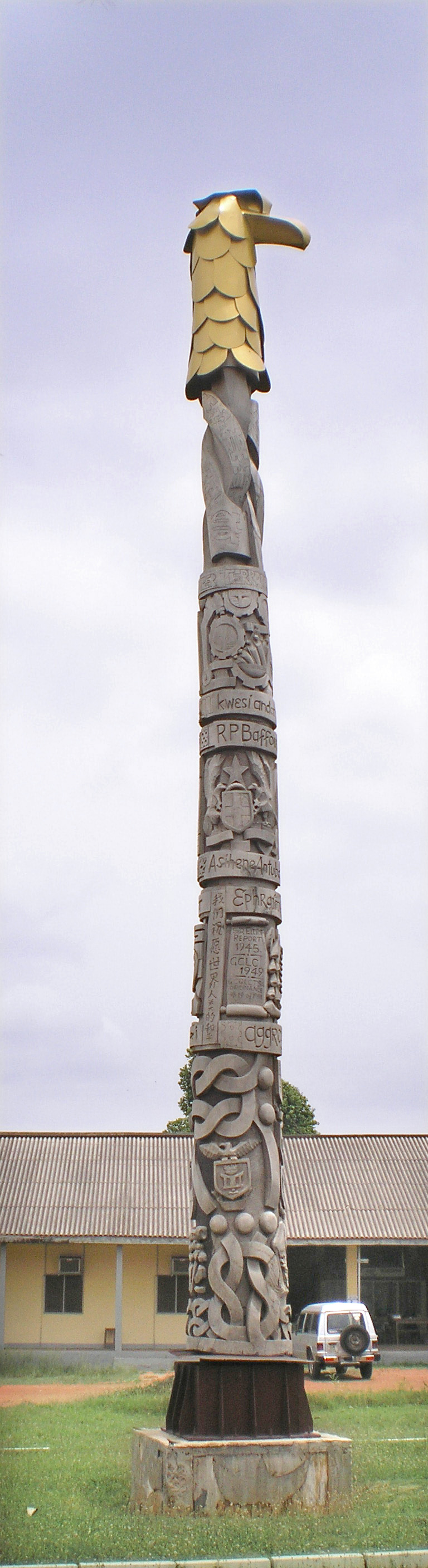
The tallest (16.5 m or 54 ft) peace pole in the world on the campus of the Kwame Nkrumah University of Science and Technology in Ghana. It is made of a 105-year-old Sapele tree. Five languages – Twi (a local language in Ghana), Hindi, Chinese, Swahili, and Arabic – are used on the pole to express the peace prayer: "May Peace Be on Earth".

Peace Pole in 12 languages at Alverno College, Milwaukee

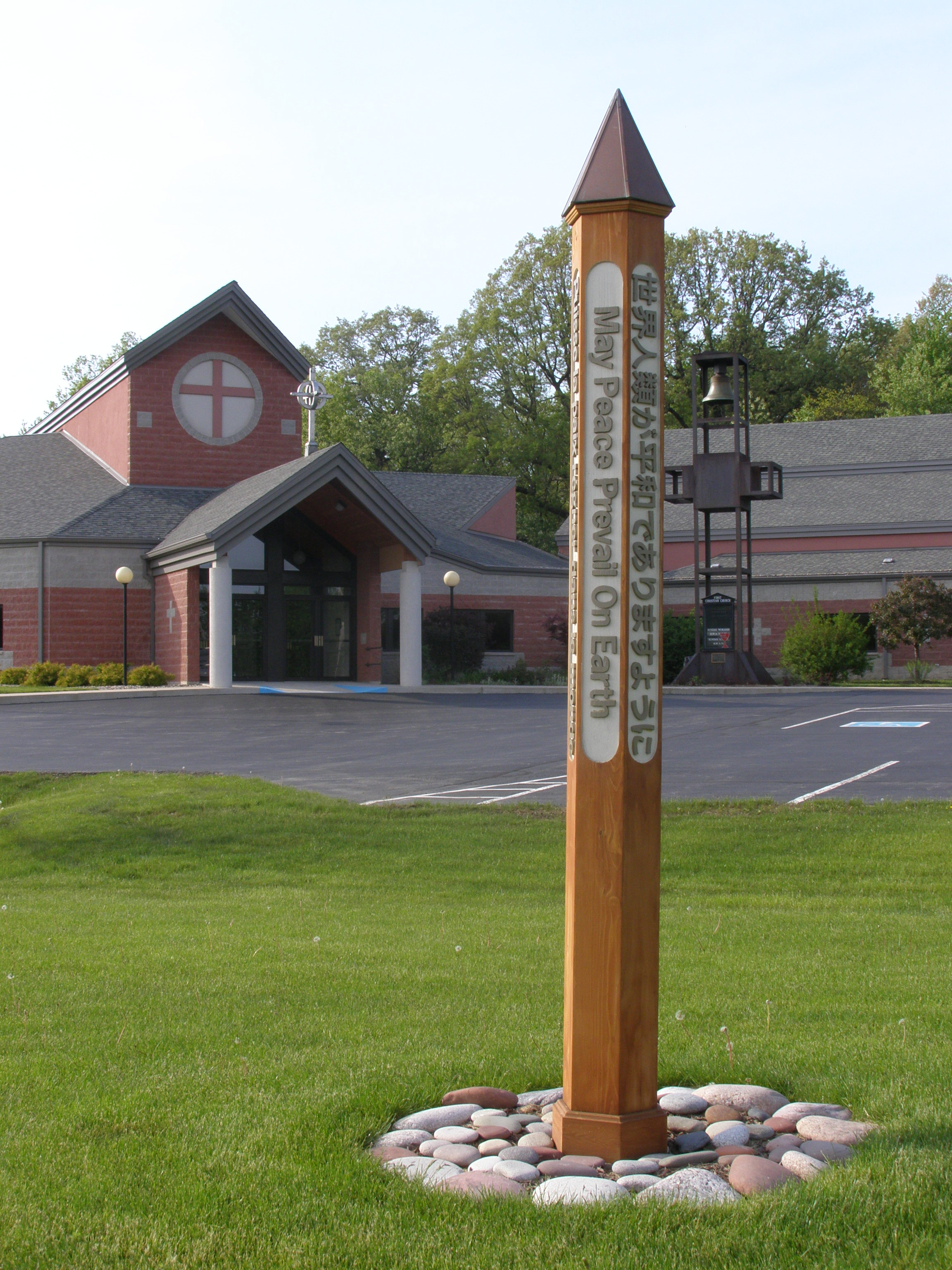
Peace pole at a church in Valparaiso, Indiana. Displays the Japanese text rotated, not arranged vertically.

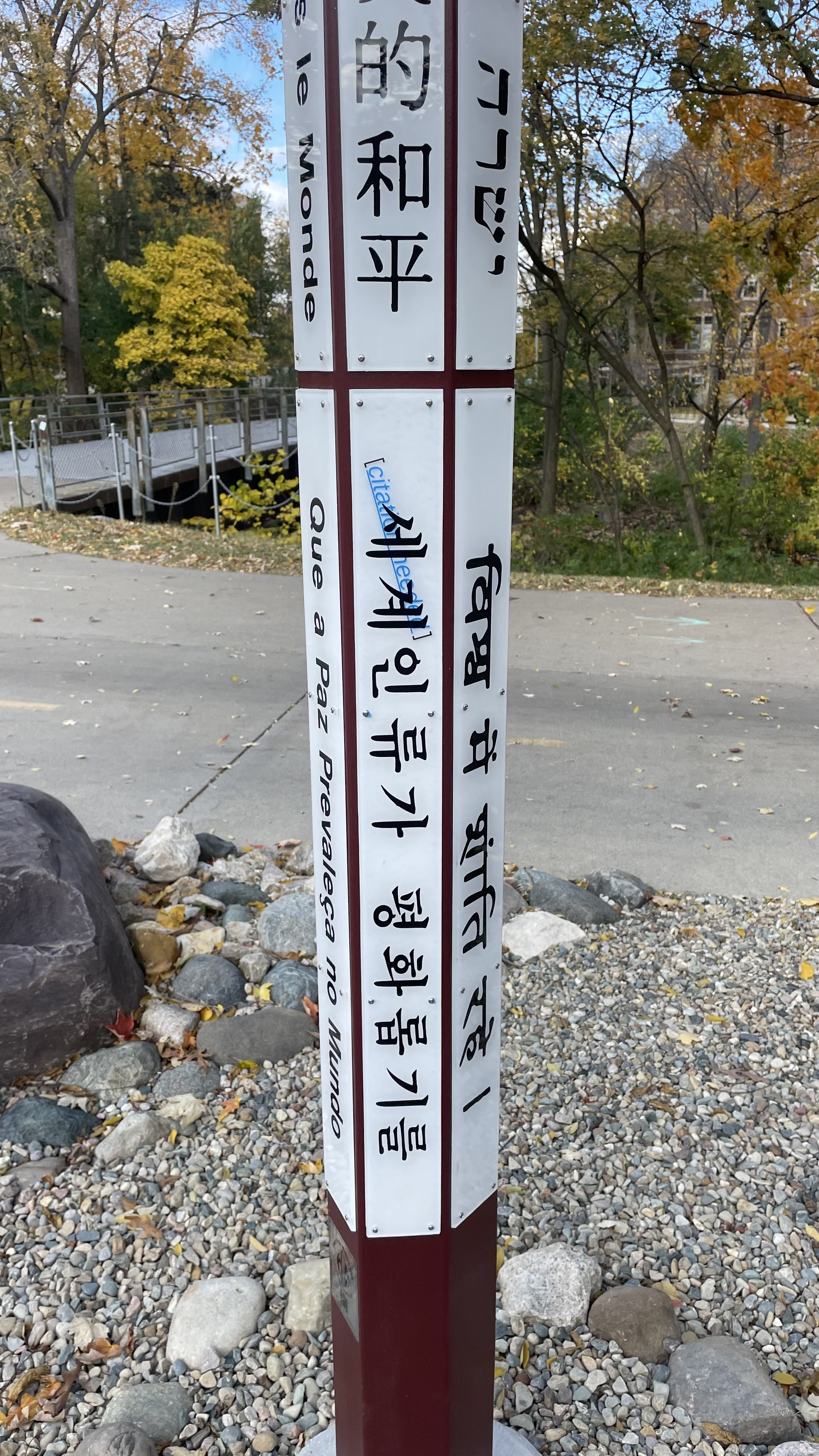
Peace pole on the campus of Michigan State University. Korean text not arranged properly for vertical writing, but Chinese text above it is.

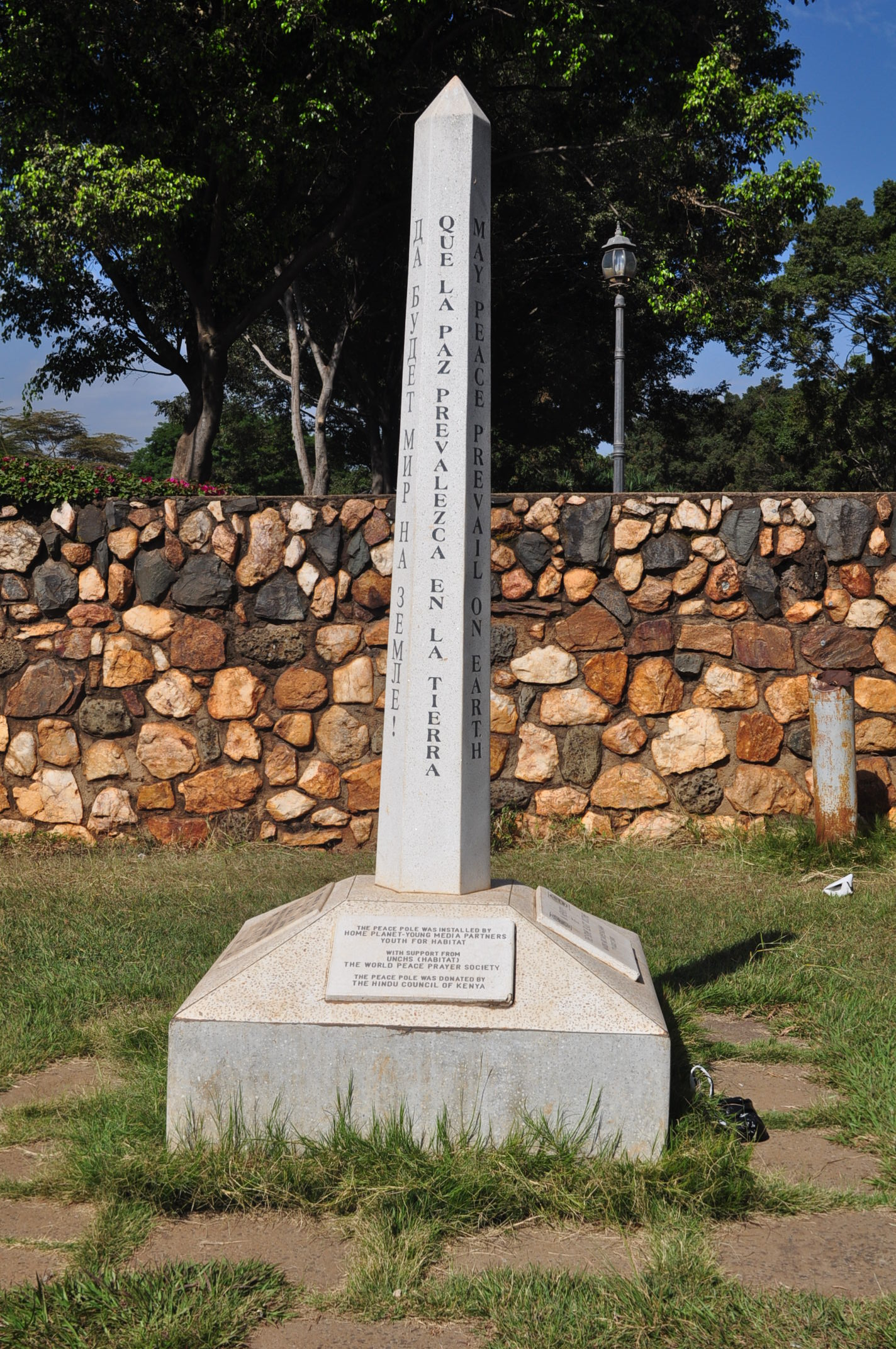
Monument in memory of the 1998 embassy bomb blast victims from Nairobi (Kenya) and Dar es Salaam (Tanzania). Shows an unusual vertical arrangement of the engraved text.

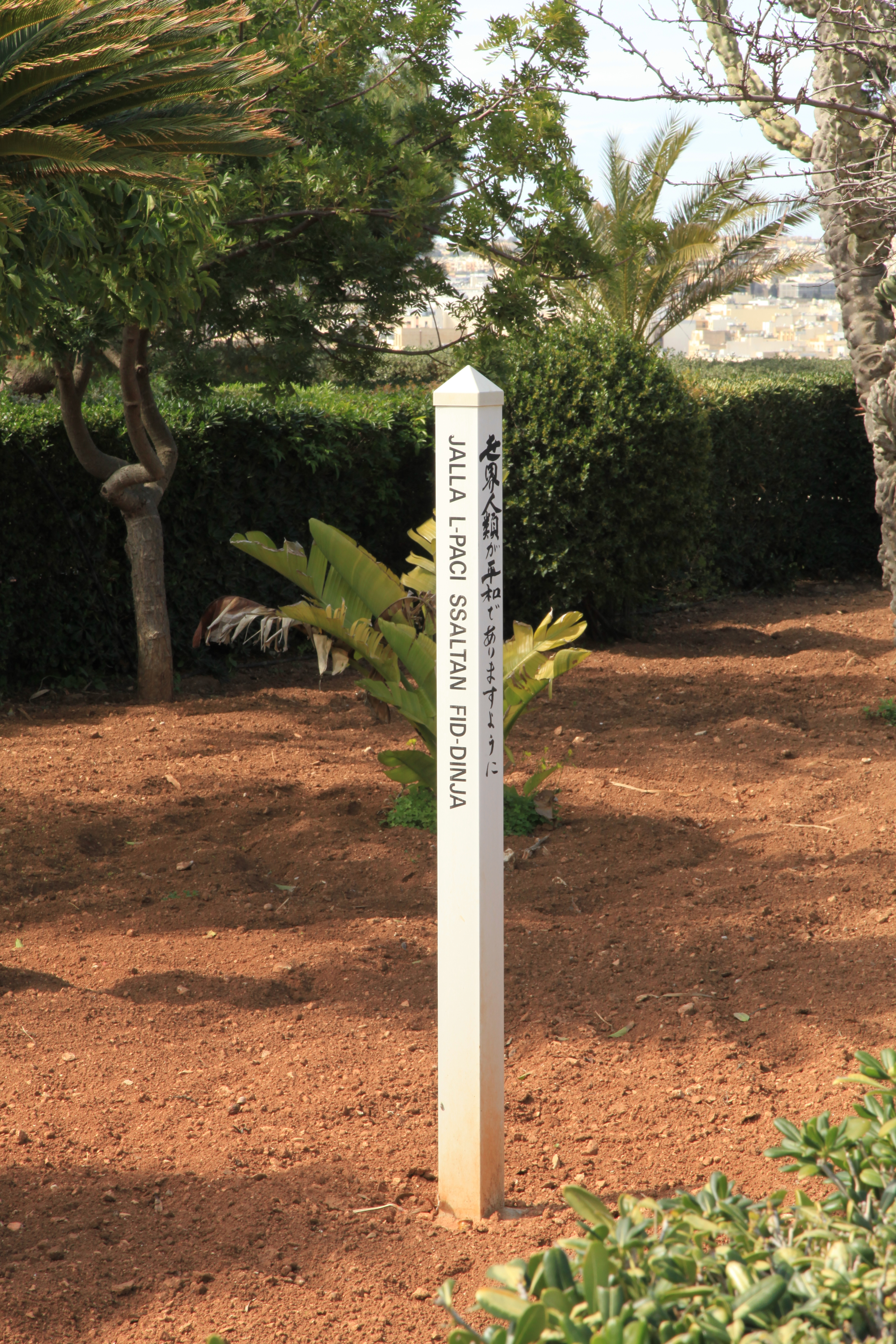
Peace pole planted in Argotti Botanic Gardens (Floriana, Malta)

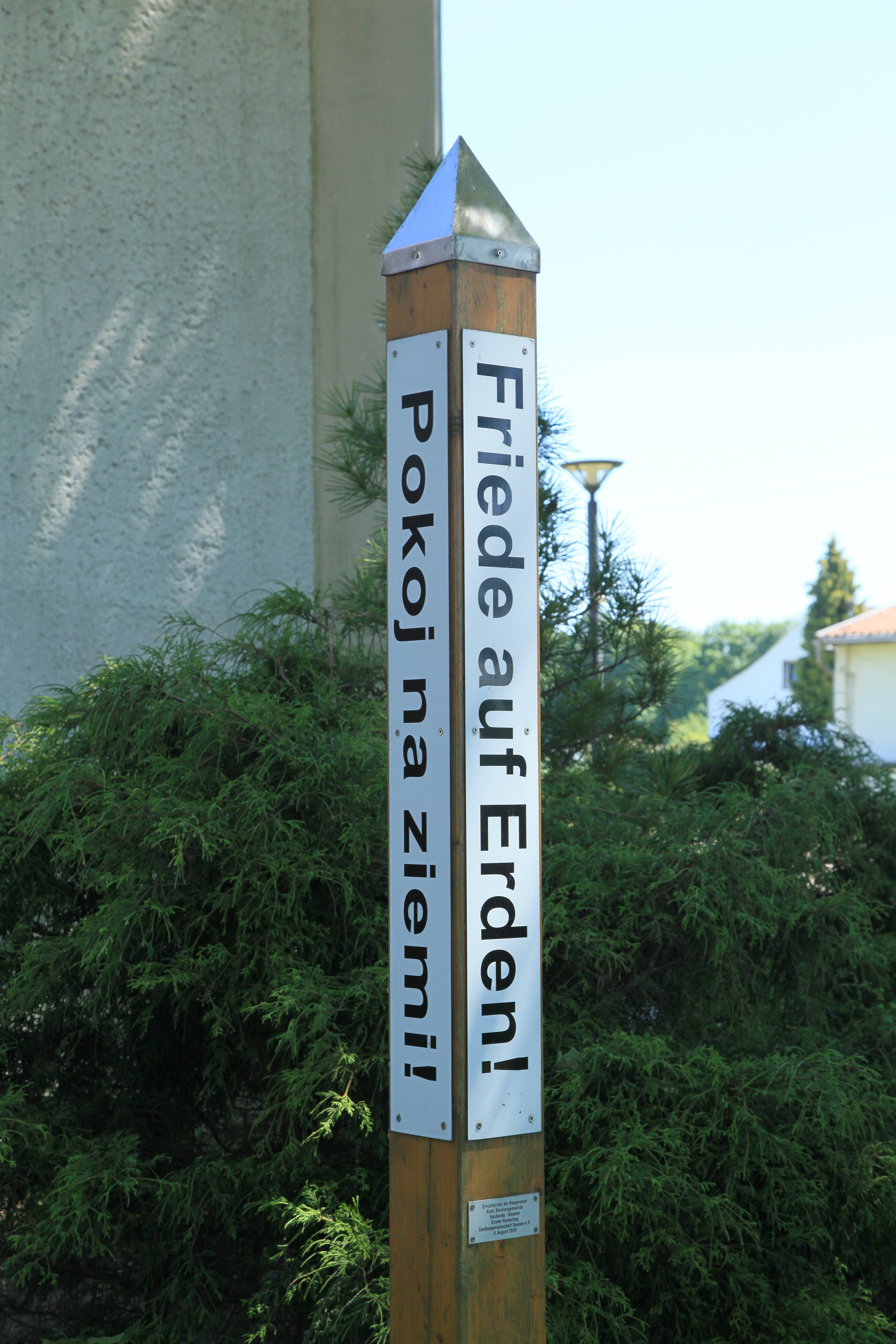
Peace marker with abbreviated texts in Dortmund, Germany

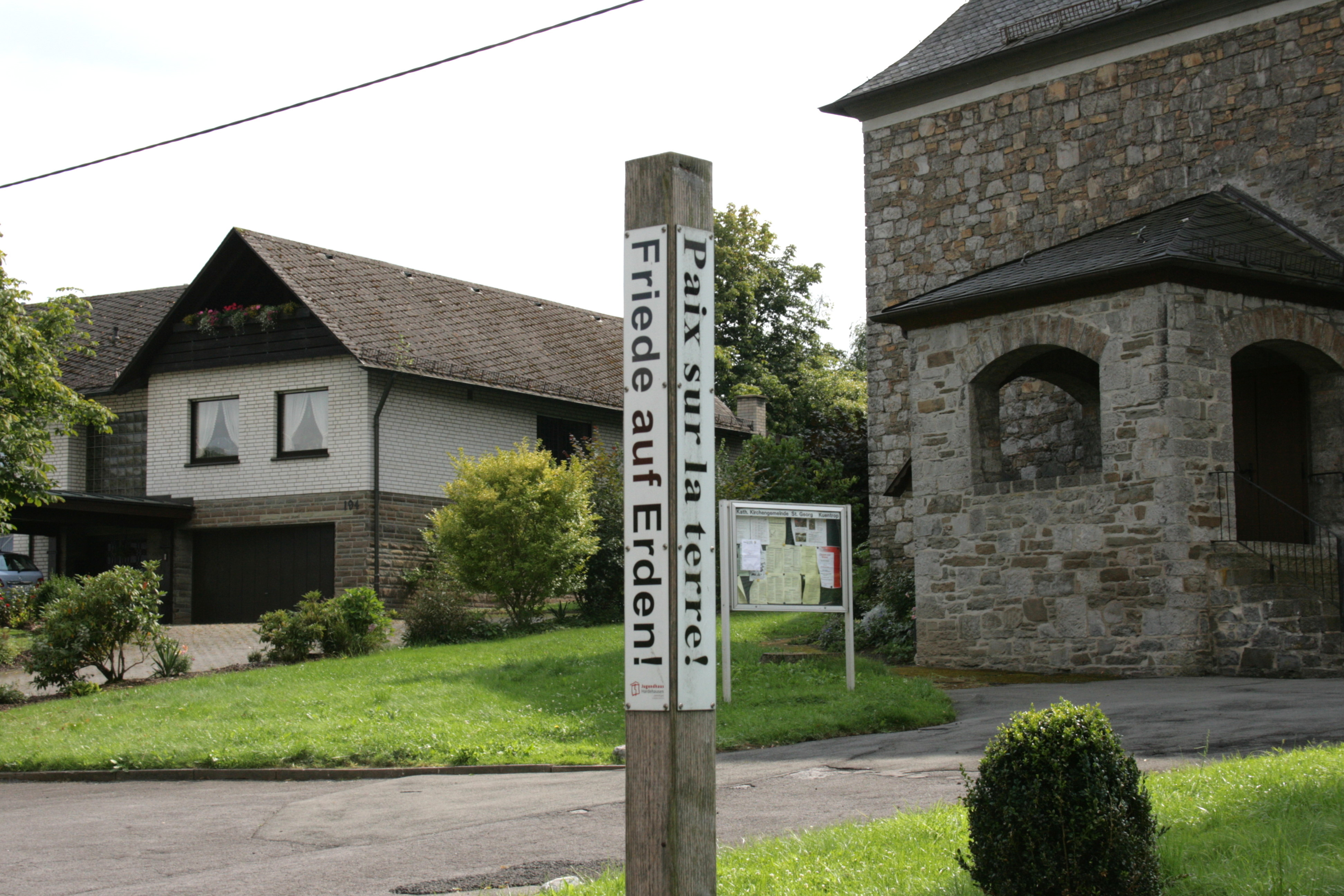
Peace marker with abbreviated texts in Neuenrade, Germany

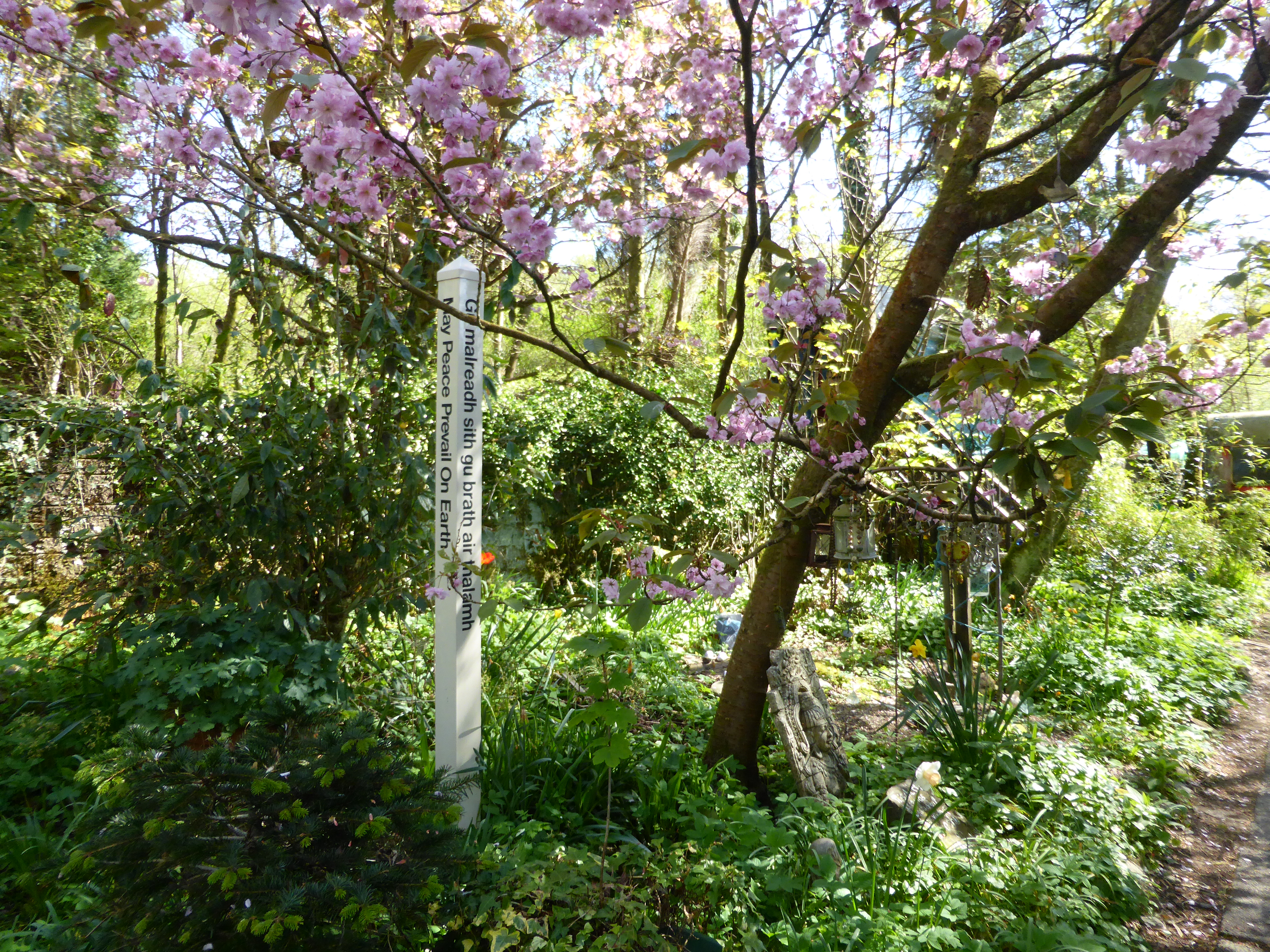
Peace Pole and Cherry Tree planted by Hiroshima Survivors at Faslane Peace Camp, Scotland (on 6 August 1985)

== See also ==
- Ceremonial pole

== Sources ==
- Yoshida, Naofumi (15 March 2019). 五井昌久の平和思想を支える理念 : その形成と展開 [The Principles Underlying Masahisa Goi's Philosophy of Peace: Their Formation and Development] (PhD thesis) (in Japanese). Kokugakuin University. doi:10.57529/00002459.
