= World Peace Prayer Society =

Non-sectarian pacifist organization

The World Peace Prayer Society
- Headquarters: Wassaic, New York
- Region served: Global
- Website: http://www.worldpeace.org

The World Peace Prayer Society (WPPS) is a pacifist organization. It was founded in 1988. In 2019, the organization's official name was changed to May Peace Prevail on Earth International.

Its motto is "May Peace Prevail on Earth". This was taken from the prayer of the religion Masahisa Goi（五井昌久） founded. WPPS was founded in New York by Masami Saionji（西園寺昌美）, the adopted daughter of Masahisa Goi and successor to his religious organization, the Byakko Shinko Kai（白光真宏会）. The organization took over peace promotion activities, such as the erection of Peace Poles, from the Byakko Shinko Kai. The organization is commonly known through its Peace Pole Project.

In 1990, the society was accepted as a non-governmental organization (NGO) in affiliation with the United Nations Department of Public Information.

== World Peace Sanctuary ==
The World Peace Sanctuary is the international home of the World Peace Prayer Society. Nestled in the foothills of the Berkshire Mountains, the site occupies 154 acres (0.62 km^{2}) located in Wassaic, New York two hours north of New York City.

The Sanctuary serves as home to annual events, including the World Peace Festival, Earth Day Peace Fair, Thanksgiving for the Earth, Honoring Dr. Martin Luther King Jr., and Planet Peace Day for schoolchildren.
