= Mahamandaleshwar =

Hindu religious title

Mahamandaleshwar (or Maha Mandaleshwar) is a title used by some Hindu monks of the Dashanami order of swamis, founded by Shankaracharya. The word Mahamandaleshwar means "superior of great and/or numerous monasteries" or "superior of a religious district or province"; the title implies a great spiritual leader.

In 2019, nine foreigners were given the title Mahamandaleshwar for the first time at the Kumbh Mela.

== Some honored ==
- Nithyananda
- Vishwananda

== See also ==
- Mahant
