= Regional Court of Hamburg =

Landgericht Hamburg
- Abbreviation: LG Hamburg
- Founded: 1811
- Headquarters: Hamburg
- Region served: Oberlandesgericht Hamburg
- Members: 580
- Präsident des Landgerichts: Bernd Lübbe
- Key people: Birte Meyerhoff
- Website: https://justiz.hamburg.de/gerichte/landgericht-hamburg

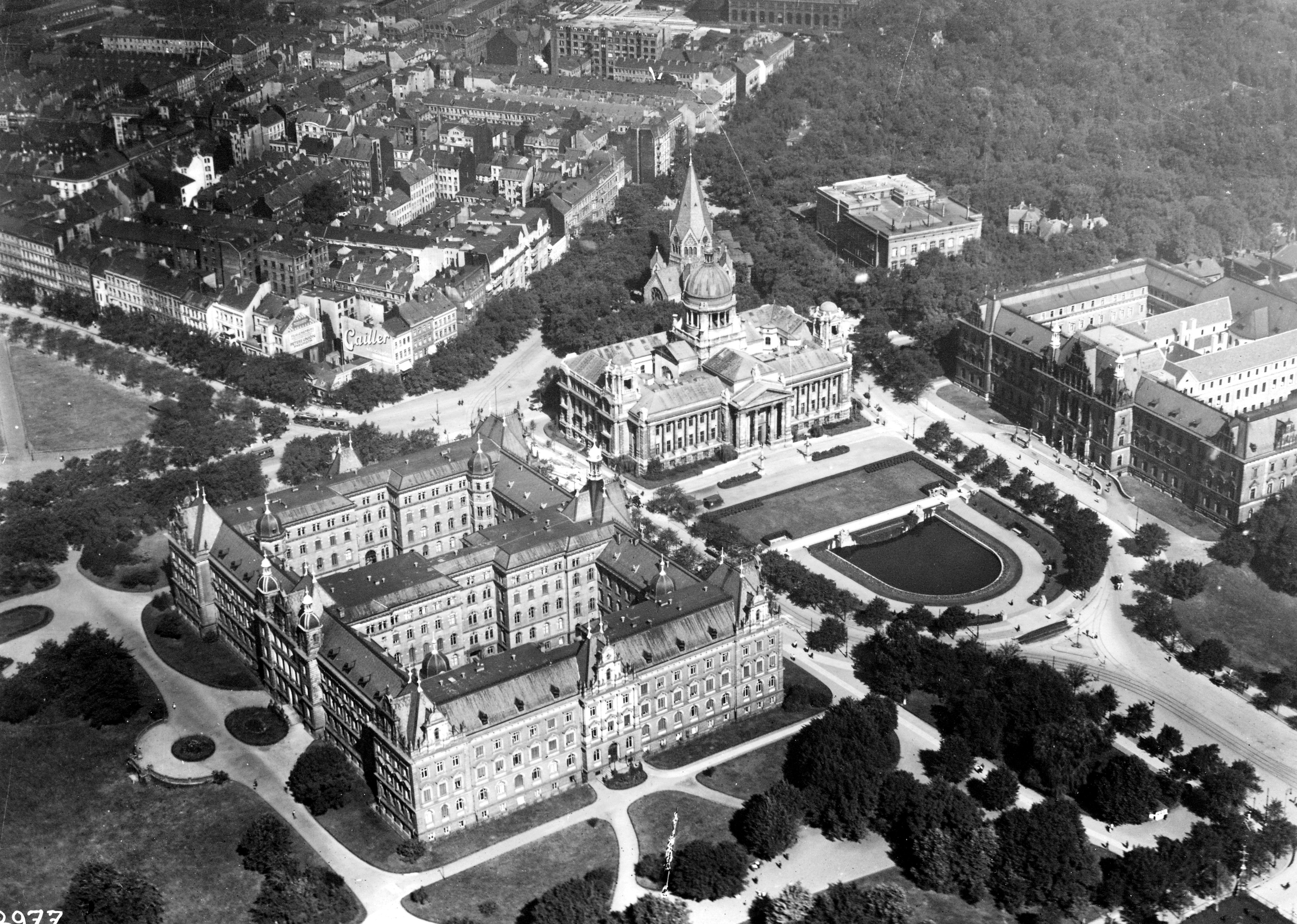
Grounds of the Hamburg Regional Court with the civil justice building (left) and the criminal justice building (right). The building behind Sievekingplatz and the large ramparts is the Hanseatic Higher Regional Court.

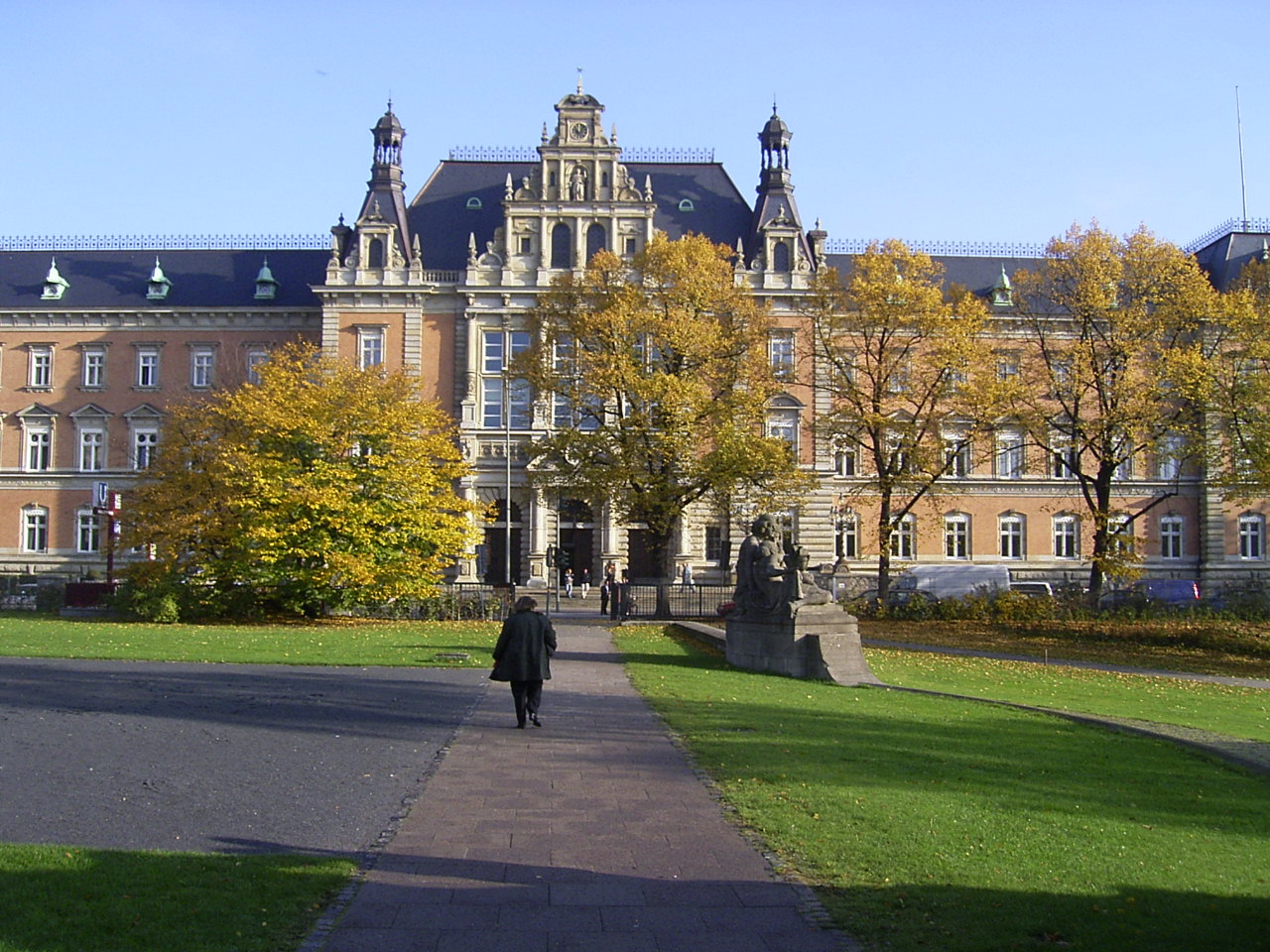
Criminal justice building of the district and regional court of Hamburg, view from Sievekingplatz.

The Hamburg Regional Court is a court of ordinary jurisdiction and the only regional court in the district of the Hanseatic Higher Regional Court based in Hamburg. The first woman to head the Hamburg Regional Court was Konstanze Görres-Ohde, who held office from 1996 to 2001. Sibylle Umlauf was president from 2009 until her retirement on March 31, 2018. Marc Tully headed the court from September 2018 to November 2020.

== Court seat and district ==
The seat of the court is the Free and Hanseatic City of Hamburg. The 755 km^{2} judicial district covers the entire area of the city-state with 1,841,179 inhabitants.

The Hamburg Regional Court is also responsible for legal disputes over technical property rights for the territory of the Free Hanseatic City of Bremen and the states of Mecklenburg-Western Pomerania and Schleswig-Holstein.

== Building ==
The court is located at Sievekingplatz 1 (civil justice building) and Sievekingplatz 3 (criminal justice building). The civil justice building, its extension, the criminal justice building opposite with the attached remand prison on Holstenglacis and the Hanseatic Higher Regional Court form a listed ensemble known as the Hamburg Justice Forum.

- Presidents
  - 1980 - 1995: Roland Makowka
  - 1996 - 2001: Konstanze Görres-Ohde
  - 2002 - 2008: Kai-Volker Öhlrich
  - 2009 - 31 March 2018 Sibylle Umlauf, ausgeschieden wegen Pensionierung
  - September 2018 - November 2020: Marc Tully
  - Since 14. April 2021: Bernd Lübbe

== Superior and subordinate courts ==
The Hanseatic Higher Regional Court is superior to the Hamburg Regional Court. The district courts of Hamburg, Altona, Barmbek, Bergedorf, Blankenese, Harburg, St. Georg and Wandsbek are subordinate.

== Known procedures ==
- 1942: Fritz Walter Tauchau was sentenced to three years in prison for “Rassenschande.” He was deported to Auschwitz in the same year and murdered there shortly afterwards.
- 1949/1950: In two trials led by judge Walter Tyrolf, who himself had Nazi ties, the Nazi propaganda director Veit Harlan (Jud Süß (1940)) was acquitted of the charge of aiding and abetting the Nazi persecution of Jews.
- 1950: The Hamburg Regional Court prohibited Erich Lüth from calling for a boycott of a Veit Harlan film. The ruling was only overturned eight years later by the Federal Constitutional Court because it violated the fundamental right to freedom of expression.
- 1953: Acquittal for the naval officer Rudolf Petersen, who had three of his sailors executed in 1945, just two days after the unconditional surrender of the Wehrmacht.
- 1962: Acquittal “due to lack of evidence” for SS-Obersturmbannführer Willi Dusenschön, who was accused of murdering the social democratic journalist Fritz Solmitz in the Fuhlsbüttel concentration camp.
- 1963 bis 1965: Mariotti trials, in which the defendant was initially convicted and later acquitted.
- 1985: In the trial of the fake Hitler diaries the court sentenced Konrad Kujau to four and a half years in prison.
- 1986: The court sentenced four of the approximately 30 skinheads who beat the migrant Ramazan Avcı to death in the street to prison terms of between three and ten years for manslaughter. Murder was denied because there were no base motives.
- 1991: In the proceedings concerning the unlawful police operation at the Hamburg Kessel, the court issued a warning with a suspended sentence against the police officers responsible for 861 counts of deprivation of liberty.
- 1998: The state court made a civil ruling on liability for web links. Many website operators then distanced themselves from the content of the external websites they linked to by means of a disclaimer, citing the ruling, because the court had allegedly recognized this approach as an effective distancing from illegal linked content. On the contrary, the court had determined that when linking to a third-party website from one's own website, it is not sufficient to point out the personal responsibility of the author of the linked page in order to effectively distance themselves.
- 2001: Acquittal of judge and right-wing populist Ronald Schill on charges of perverting the course of justice
- 2004: The Hamburg Regional Court prohibited the Springer publishing house from claiming that Günter Wallraff was an unofficial employee of the Ministry of State Security.
- 2019: In the trial against former SS man Bruno Dey for aiding and abetting murder in at least 5,230 cases in the Stutthof concentration camp, the court imposed a youth sentence of two years on probation.

There are a number of civil chambers with special jurisdictions at the Hamburg Regional Court. Civil Chamber 24 of the Hamburg Regional Court, which is responsible for disputes arising from violation of personal rights, violation of protection of honour or interference with the right to an established and practised business directly through publications in the press, film, radio, television or other mass media or through reports from press agencies, was headed by Judge Andreas Buske until 2011 and has been headed by presiding judge Simone Käfer since then, has become known nationwide since around the year 2000 through case law which, to a degree that is controversial even among experts, emphasises the priority of personal rights over the interests of freedom of the press and freedom of expression and sets very strict copyright requirements for Internet publications. Due to these peculiarities and as a consequence of the principle of “flying jurisdiction”, the Hamburg Regional Court often hears media law cases in which neither the plaintiff nor the defendant have a connection to Hamburg.

=== Criticism ===
In May 2016, lawyer Udo Vetter criticized the alleged “Hamburg monopoly” in his law blog as a “strange concentration of interpretive sovereignty in the right of expression“. The reason why “the vast majority of plaintiffs“ choose the flying jurisdiction there is that the Hamburg Regional Court [...] is considered the safest bet when it comes to deciding in favor of the plaintiffs in the area of freedom of expression. In other words, in effect, it goes against freedom of expression.” He hoped that the Böhmermann affair, in the course of which Recep Tayyip Erdoğan applied for an interim injunction at the Hamburg Regional Court, would provide "enough impetus to vigorously question this strange floating jurisdiction. The Hamburg judiciary's sovereignty over what can and cannot be said in Germany should certainly be put to the test." However, the temporary injunction against Böhmermann was also upheld by the Higher Regional Court of Hamburg and the Federal Court of Justice. However, the court was reprimanded several times in connection with other rulings.

== See also ==
- Liste deutscher Gerichte
- Liste der Gerichte der Freien und Hansestadt Hamburg

== Literature ==
- Hans Robinsohn: Justiz als politische Verfolgung. Die Rechtsprechung in „Rassenschandefällen“ beim Landgericht Hamburg 1936 – 1943. Vierteljahrshefte für Zeitgeschichte, Schriftenreihe 35. Deutsche Verlagsanstalt, Stuttgart 1982
