= Jungfernstieg =

Promenade in Hamburg, Germany

Coordinates: 53°33′11″N 9°59′33″E

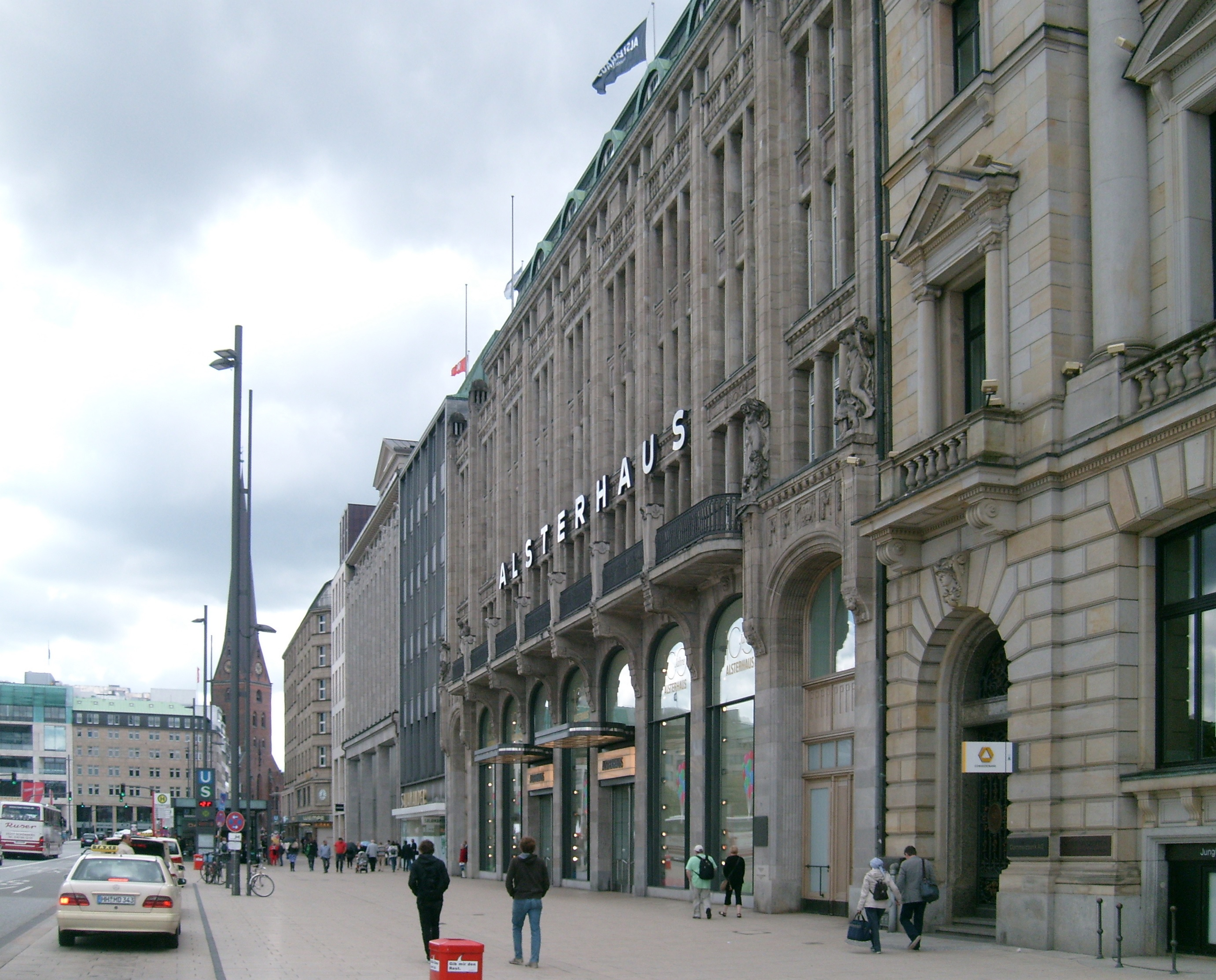
Alsterhaus and the eastern end of Jungfernstieg, seen towards St. Petri

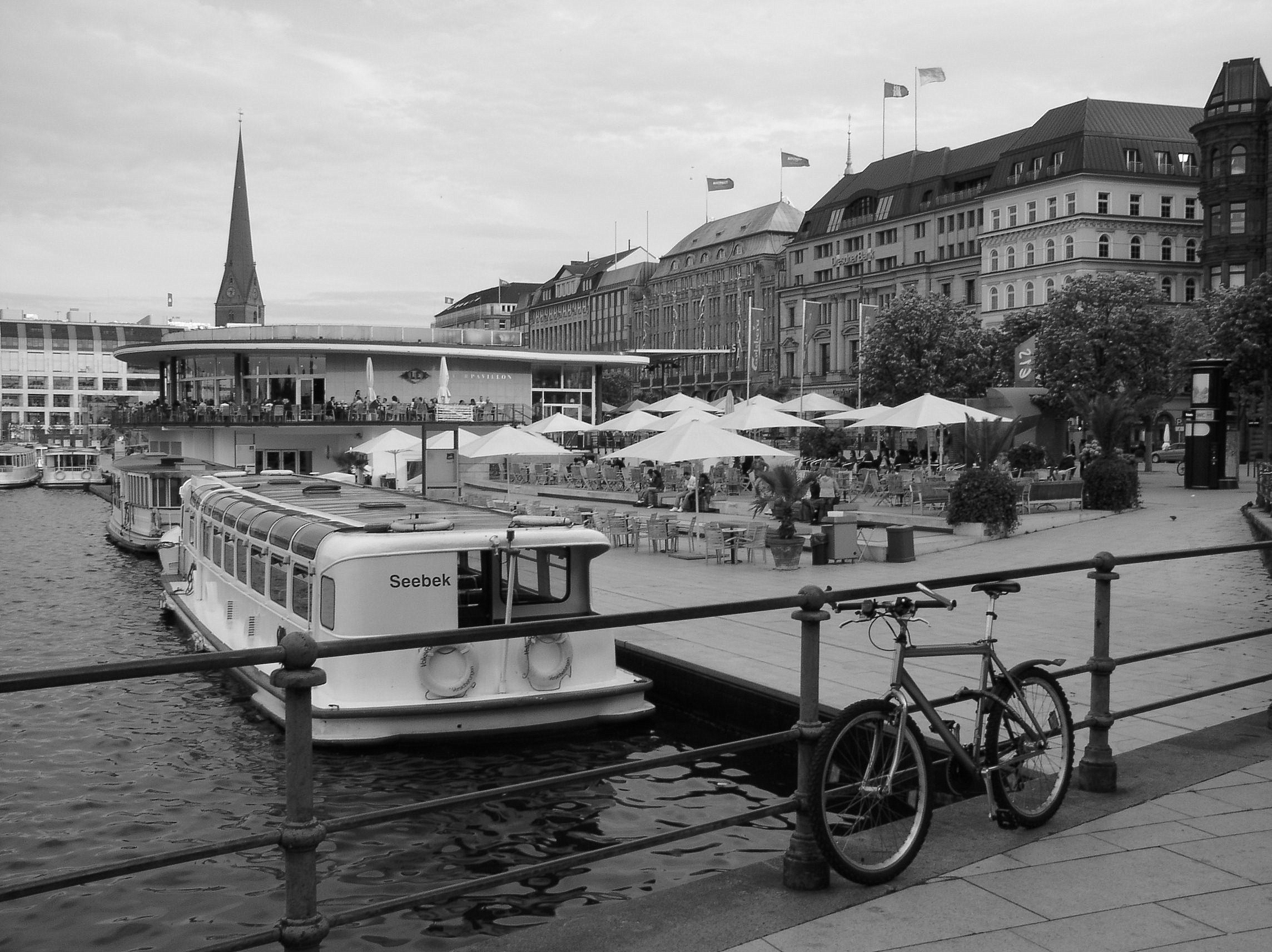
Alster ferry boats, Alsterpavillon and Jungfernstieg

The Jungfernstieg (German pronunciation: [ˈjʊŋfɐnʃtiːk]) is an urban promenade in Hamburg, Germany. It is the city's foremost boulevard.

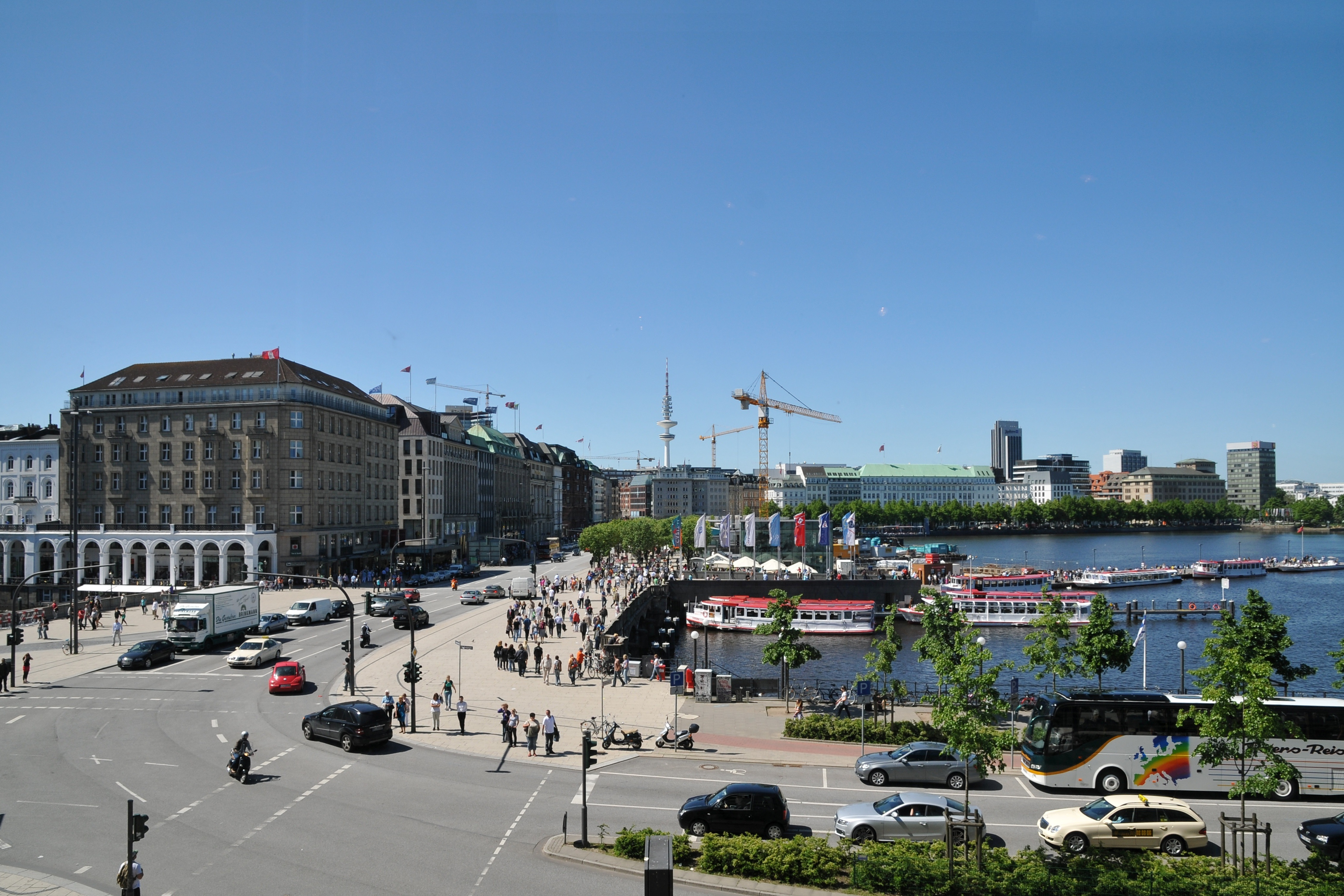
Jungfernstieg, seen towards Neustadt

== Location ==
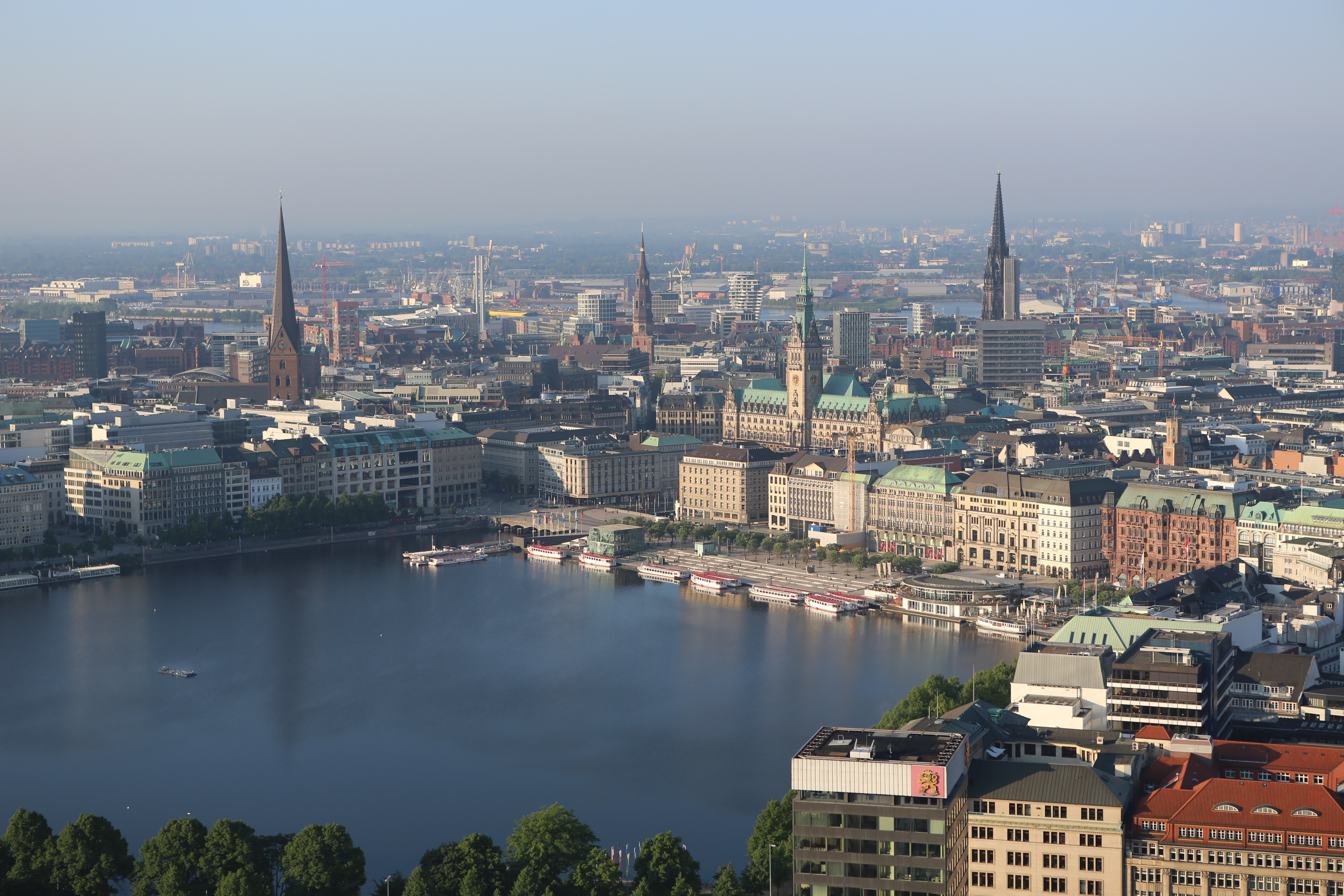
Aerial view of Lake Binnenalster; Jungfernstieg in the center

Jungfernstieg mostly lies within the quarter of Neustadt; however at its easternmost it stretches as far as Hamburg-Altstadt. In total the Jungfernstieg stretches some 600 m along the southern and south-western shores of the Binnenalster lake and continues further to Gänsemarkt. On the lakeside it is framed by Ballindamm (and the nearby Europa Passage shopping centre) to the east and Neuer Jungfernstieg to the west. Towards the built-up area Jungfernstieg intersects with a number of streets - in the Altstadt with Bergstraße, Plan and Reesendamm; the latter carries on along the shore of Kleine Alster (Little Alster) towards Rathausmarkt. At Reesendammbrücke, Jungfernstieg crosses the Alster into Neustadt. It goes past Neuer Wall and Große Bleichen, two of Hamburg's leading shopping precincts. At the intersection with Neuer Jungfernstieg, Jungfernstieg forms a Y-junction with Colonnaden, another shopping street.

The entire circumference of the lakeside is occupied by a terrace. Two pavilions are located on the terrace: the Alsterpavillion (a café), and a smaller pavilion, which functions as the entrance to the rapid transit station. The lakeside is also a hub for Hamburg's Alster ferries.

== History ==
The history of Jungfernstieg began in 1235. At that time, Count Adolph IV of Holstein commissioned the construction of a mill dam, in order to use the Alster's water for a local corn mill. The resulting mill pond turned out much larger than expected, as it reached dimensions of an outright lake. It caused a legal battle, as to who had to pay for the lost land, but it also gave land for a city expansion in the back of the dam: Hamburg's Neustadt (new town). The embankment along the newly created Lake Binnenalster was named Reesendamm, in honor of miller Heinrich Reese, who at the time operated the mill.

During the 17th and 18th century Reesendamm was enhanced and widened several times. In 1665 a line of linden trees were planted along the water front. With Hamburg's growing international sea trade and the city's status as a sovereign city-state, the elegant promenade obtained a cosmopolitan outlook and became popular for strolls along the lake front. Hanseaten accompanied their unmarried daughters out on a walk, looking for a suitable bridegroom, led to today's name of the promenade: Jungfern (i.e. maiden), Stieg (i.e. stair, walk). In 1799 the first Alsterpavillion (Alster Pavilion) was opened; it housed a café and a restaurant and − according to fashion − has been replaced six times until today. In 1838 Jungfernstieg became Germany's first street to be asphalted.

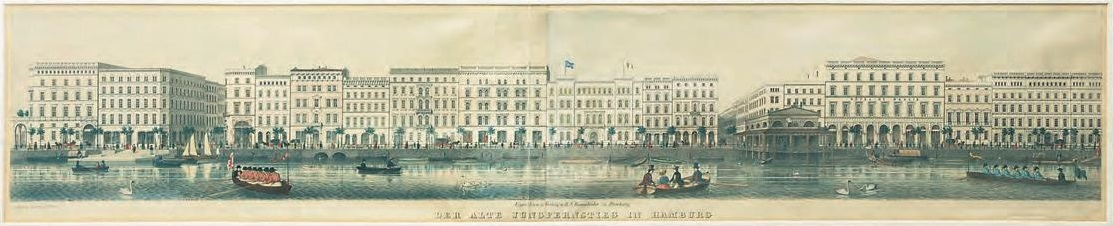
The redeveloped Jungfernstieg after of the Great Fire of 1842; steel engraving by O. Moritz

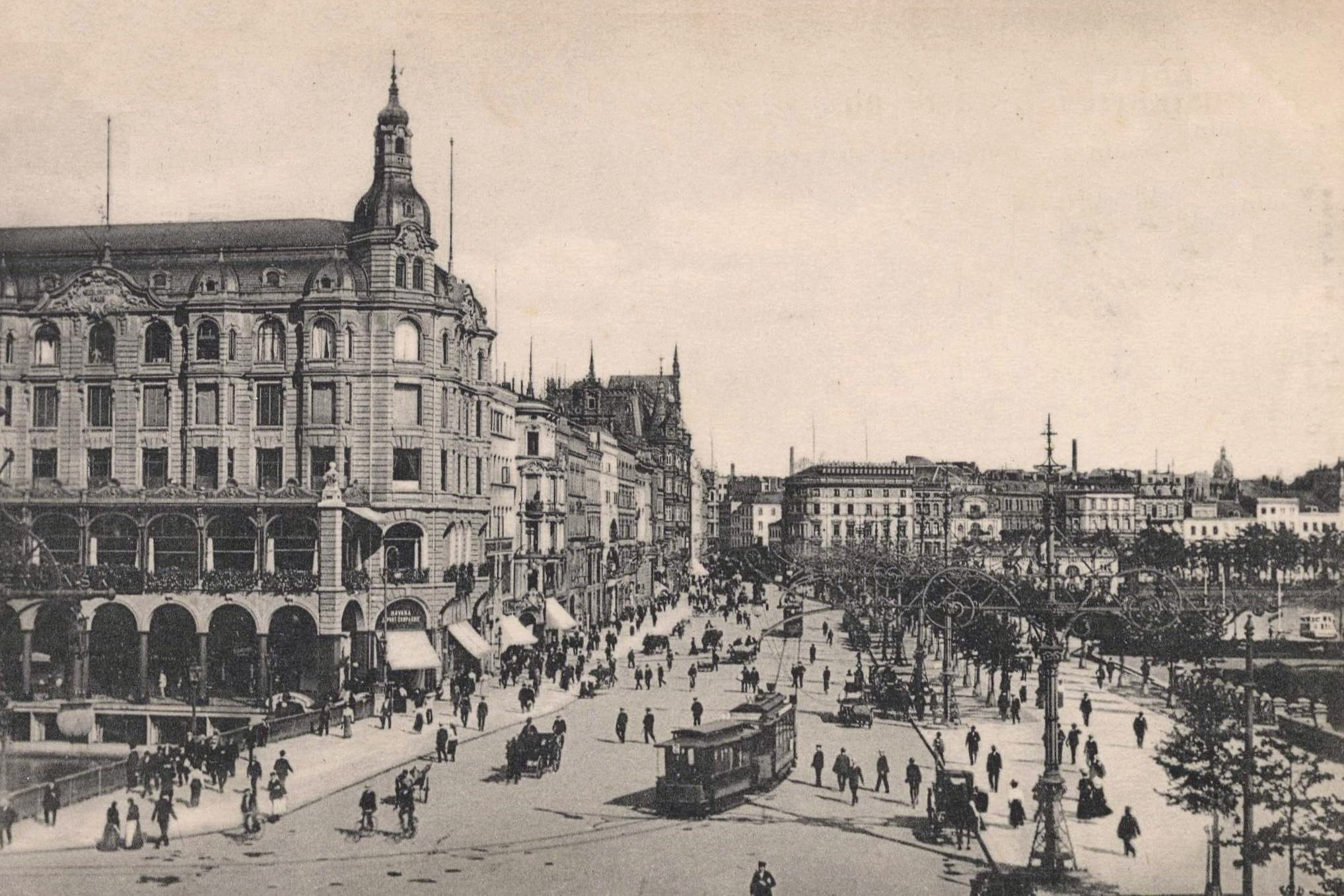
Jungfernstieg as seen from across Reesendammbrücke, ca. 1900

The Great Fire of 1842 destroyed the entire build-up. After the subsequent reconstruction, Jungfernstieg presented itself in a coherent Neoclassical form. The Arcades on Kleine Alster date from this period. In 1843, Sillem's Bazar opened on Jungfernstieg as Germany's first shopping arcade, connecting onto Poststraße. During the Gründerzeit boom in the later decades of the 19th century, many of the Neoclassical buildings were gradually replaced by various Revival style buildings. Sillem's Bazar was replaced by Renaissance Revival Hamburger Hof in 1881. Art Nouveau Heine-Haus was rebuilt in 1903. Scholviens-Passage was replaced by Alsterhaus department store in 1912.

In 1866, a horsecar line was introduced on Jungfernstieg, which by 1900 was replaced by an electric tram line. Jungfernstieg U-Bahn station was opened in 1931 and extended by an underground S-Bahn station in 1973. Gänsemarkt U-Bahn station opened in 1970. By 1978 the tram was discontinued, though the Senate has repeatedly considered to reintroduce it. During the early 2000s, Jungfernstieg was substantially refurbished.

=== Today ===
The newly refurbished lake-side's terrace forms a public waterfront-plaza with views onto lake and the lake's fountain. The terrace is used for events throughout the year.

Though not one of Hamburg's typical shopping streets, Jungfernstieg features direct access to some of Hamburg's largest shopping malls and accommodates a number of banks, art galleries and high-end shops. More importantly, its history, the scenic setting on the Binnenalster and its pivot role for the inner city's commercial life and street grid, attribute it with a strong "sense of place" for people to relax, watch and meet.

In the course of the European migrant crisis, on 31 December 2015, Jungfernstieg boulevard was one of the scenes of the numerous crimes in the city. During the summer of 2016, the promenade saw violent clashes and other crimes; migrants and refugees who gathered there in large groups were again among those involved. Several people were injured. Police eventually floodlighted the street on weekend nights to avoid further crimes, which decreased with the colder days in autumn.

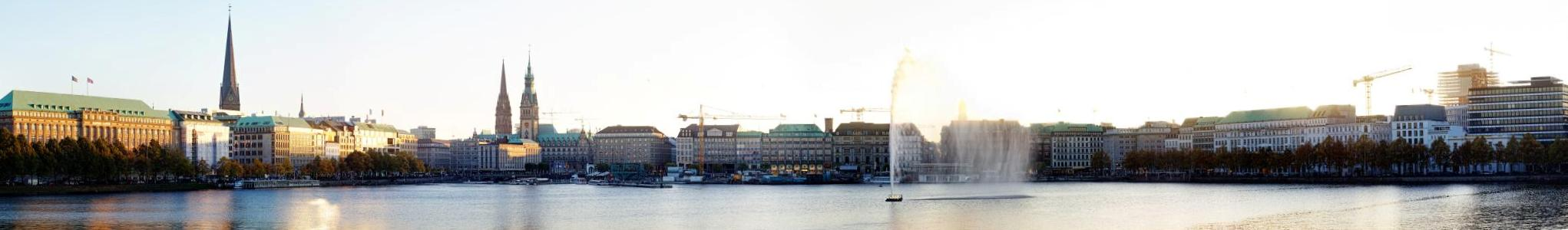
Panoramic view of Lake Binnenalster: Jungfernstieg (center), between Ballindamm (tree-lined) to the left, and Neuer Jungfernstieg (also tree-lined) to the right

== See also ==
- List of leading shopping streets and districts by city
- Brühl's Terrace in Hamburg's sister-city Dresden
- English Embankment in Hamburg's sister-city Saint Petersburg
