= Mönckebergstraße =

Commercial street in Hamburg, Germany

Coordinates: 53°33′02″N 9°59′53″E

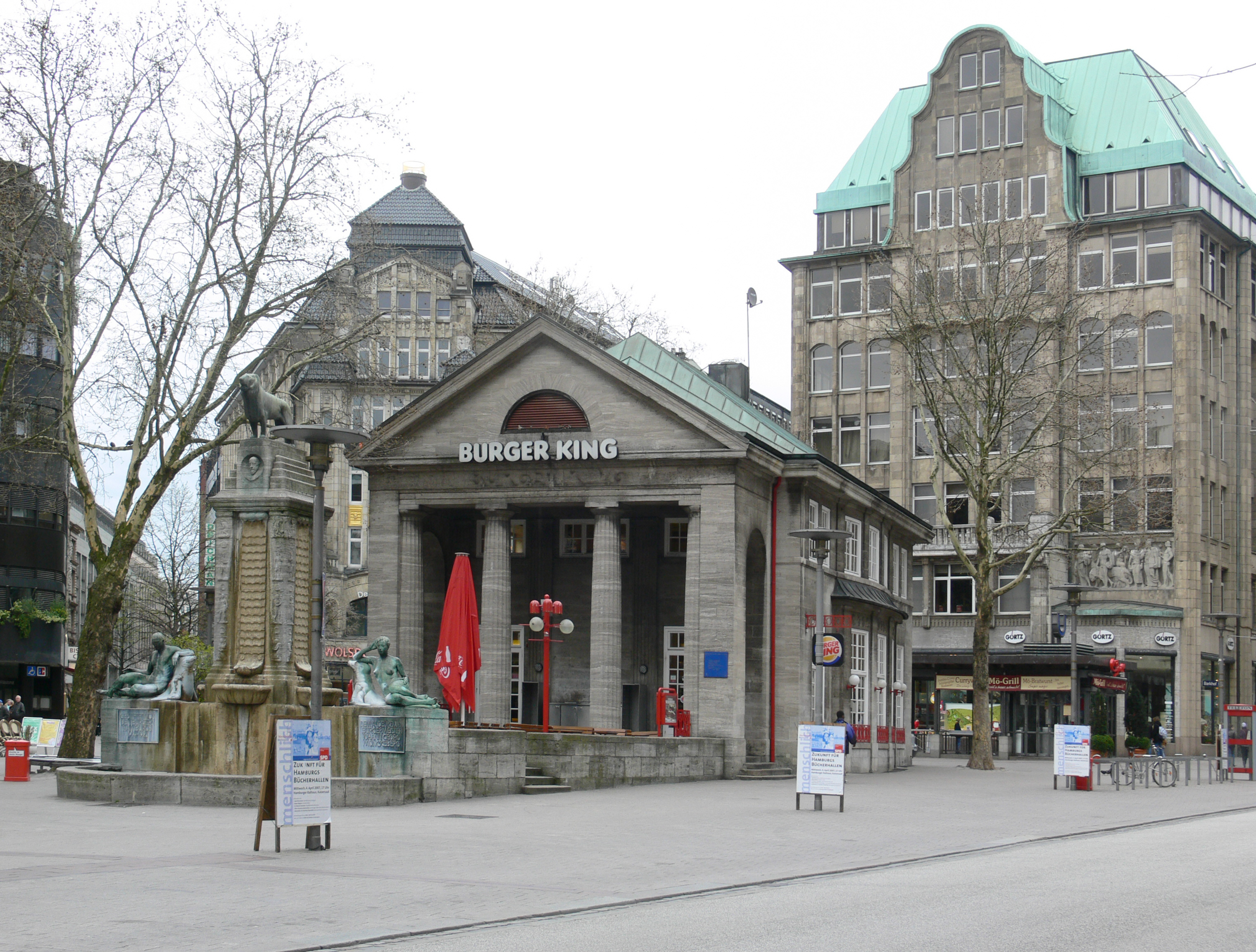
Mönckeberg-Fountain (left) at the intersection of Mönckebergstraße and Spitalerstraße.

The Mönckebergstraße (locally also called Mö) is one of the main shopping streets in Hamburg, Germany.

Mönckebergstraße is located in Hamburg-Altstadt, running some 800 m in east-west-direction between the Hauptbahnhof at Steintorwall and the Rathaus at Rathausmarkt. It is named after Johann Georg Mönckeberg, mayor of Hamburg in the 1890s and 1900s.

On the south side, Mönckebergstraße passes the churches of St. Petri and St. Jacobi. Halfway in between, at Gerhart-Hauptmann-Platz, Mönckebergstraße intersects with Spitalerstraße, another important shopping street. Notable attractions of this prominent four-way-fork-junction are the Mönckebergbrunnen (Mönckeberg-Fountain) and a former central building of Hamburg public libraries, later had been a Burger King restaurant for many years, now a Starbucks subsidiary inside a coffeehouse called Elbphilharmonie Kulturcafé.

Many major retailers such as H&M, Kaufhof, Karstadt, Karstadt Sport, Peek & Cloppenburg, Saturn or Zara have a presence on Mönckebergstraße. Many of the department stores have been converted from former kontor-houses. Some houses were demolished for the construction of Europa Passage in 2003. The shopping mall, which leads to the Jungfernstieg boulevard, opened in 2006.

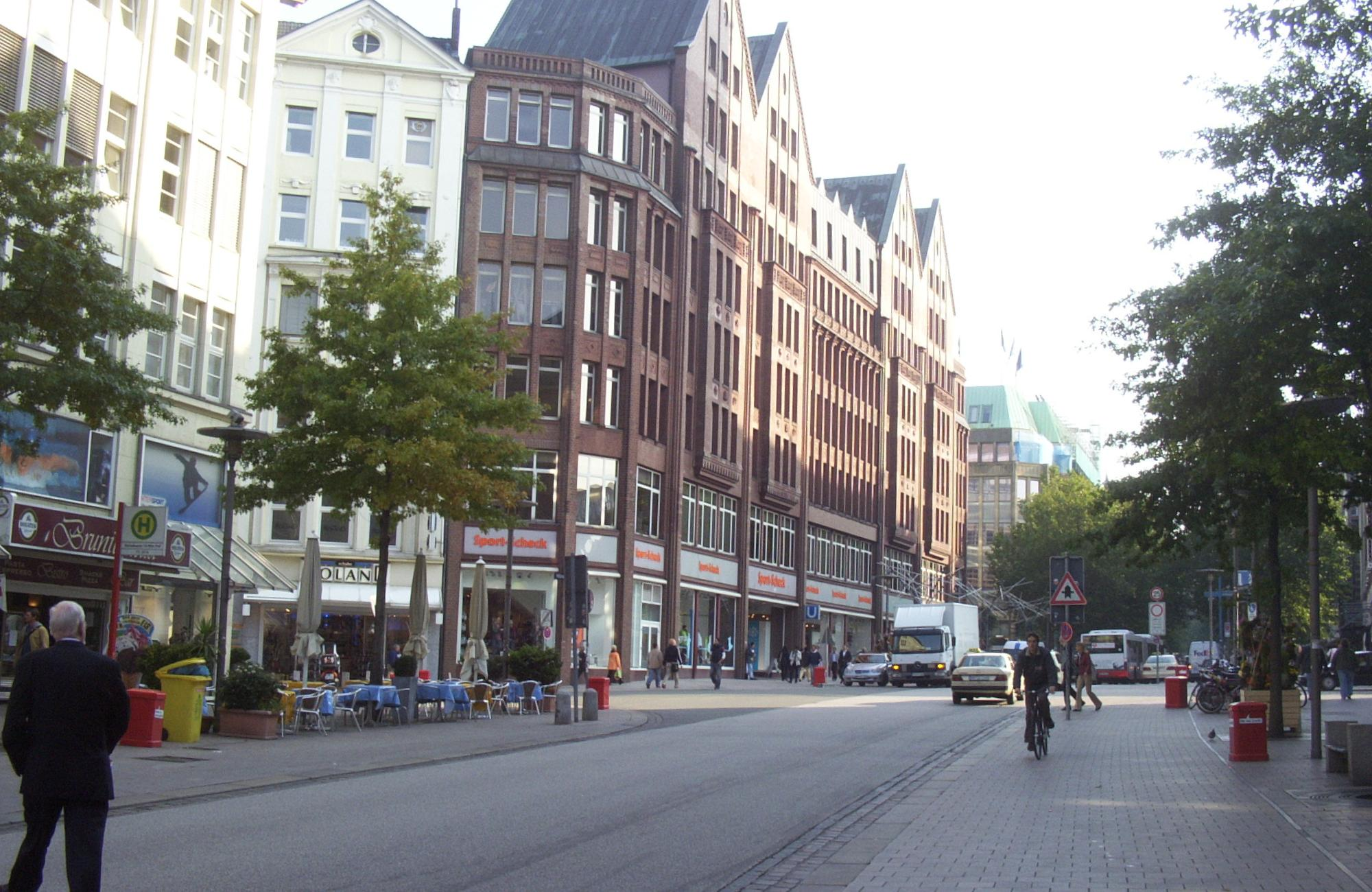
Grellhaus (left) at the intersection with Bergstraße

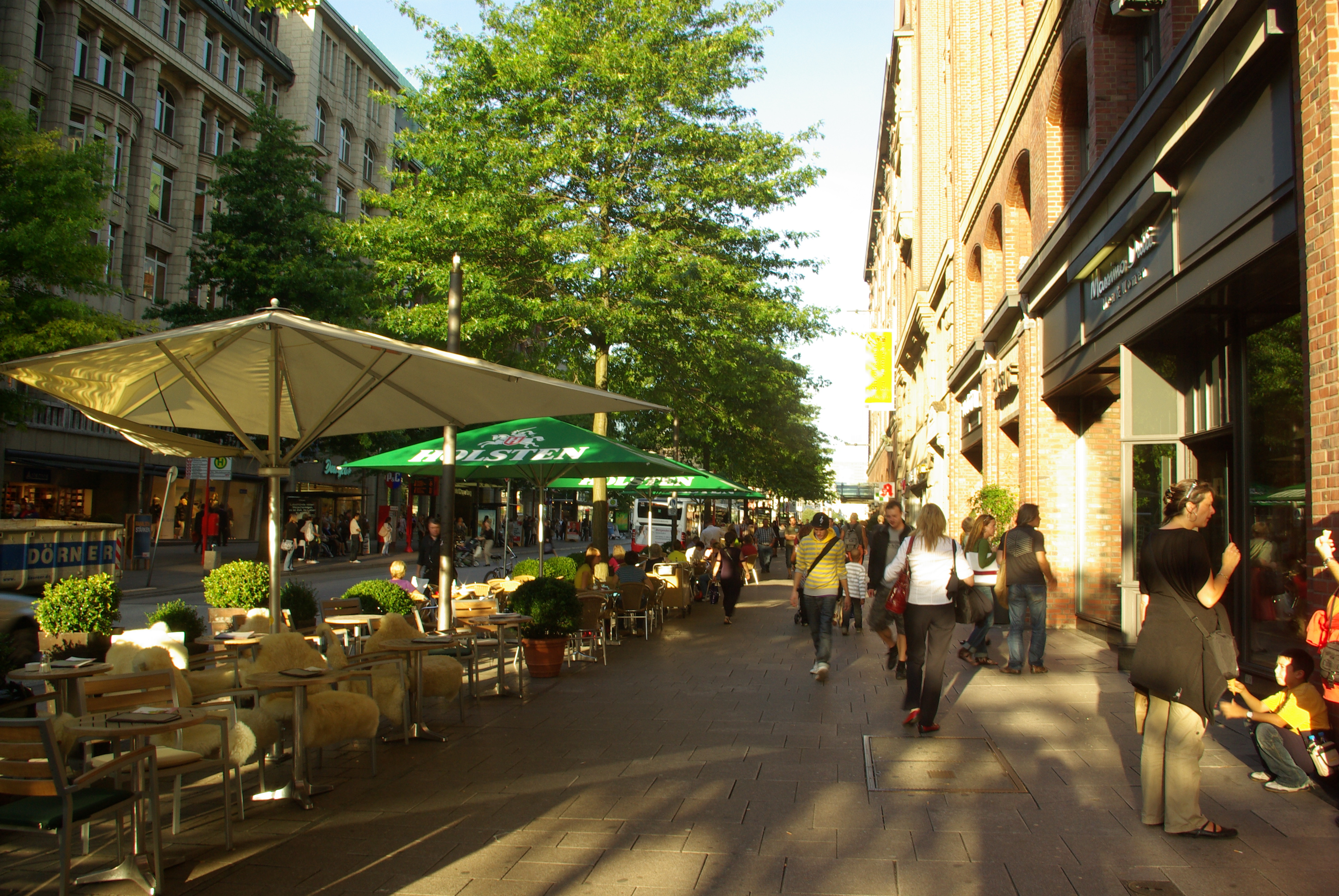
Barkhof (left) opposite Levantehaus (right)

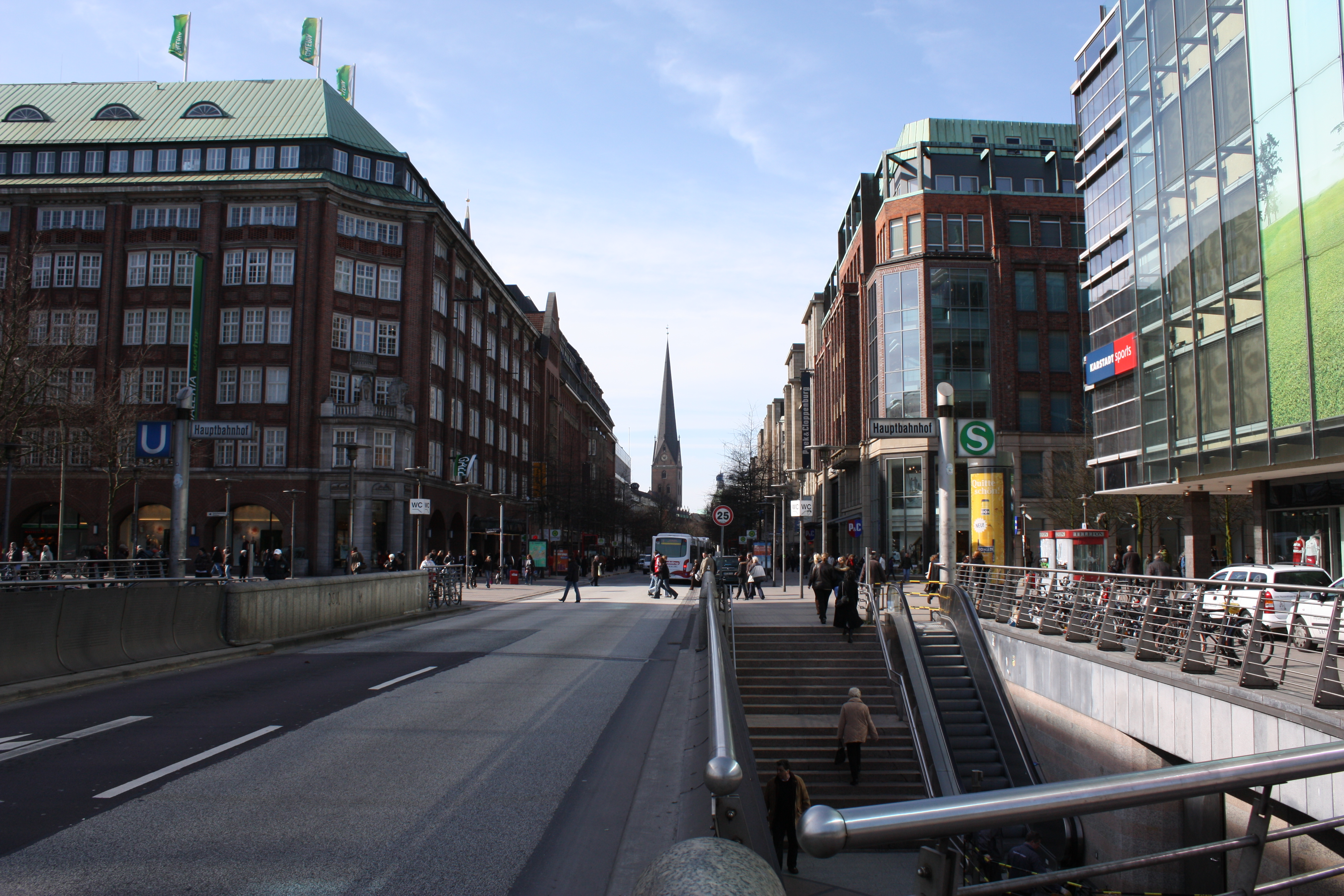
Klöpperhaus (left) at the intersection with Lange Mühren

== See also ==
- List of shopping streets and districts by city
