= Ida Ehre =

Austrian-German actress, theatre director, and manager

Ida Ehre (German: [iː.da ˈeː.ʁə]; 9 July 1900 – 16 February 1989) was an Austrian-German actor, theatre director, and manager.

== Biography ==
Ehre was born in Přerov, Moravia in 1900. Her father was a hazzan (Hebrew cantor). She learned acting at the University of Music and Performing Arts, Vienna. She made her acting debut at the Stadttheater in Bielitz, and appeared in theatres in Budapest, Cottbus, Bonn, Königsberg, Stuttgart and at the National Theatre Mannheim. From 1930, she appeared at the Lessing Theater in Berlin.

In Nazi Germany, she was not allowed to work in acting because she was Jewish, and so she helped in the gynaecolological practice of her husband, Dr. Bernhard Heyde (1899–1978), in Böblingen. After the Kristallnacht, she planned to emigrate to Chile with her husband and her daughter Ruth (born 20 October 1927 in Mannheim), but the ship they were on was ordered to return to Hamburg because of the outbreak of World War II. She was later arrested by the Gestapo and interned in the concentration camp Fuhlsbüttel for six weeks.

After the war, on 10 December 1945 she opened the Hamburger Kammerspiele theatre in the Hartungstraße in Rotherbaum in a theatre building that had been used by the Jüdischer Kulturbund until 1941. In addition to modern German drama such as Wolfgang Borchert's The Man Outside (German: Draußen vor der Tür), she brought modern pieces by playwrights from other countries for the first time in Germany, including plays by Jean Anouilh, T. S. Eliot, Jean Giraudoux, Jean-Paul Sartre and Thornton Wilder. She continued managing the theatre until her death in Hamburg from a heart attack in 1989. After her death, she was given an honorary grave in Ohlsdorf Cemetery next to Gustaf Gründgens.

== Honours ==
In 1971, she was a member of the jury at the 21st Berlin International Film Festival.

In 1984, she became the first female honorary citizen of Hamburg. She was also made an honorary doctor by the University of Hamburg. In 1971, she won the Schiller Prize of the City of Mannheim. In 1984, she received the Silberne Blatt (silver leaf) of the Dramatiker-Union (dramatists' union).

In the Altstadt quarter of Hamburg, part of the square of Gerhart-Hauptmann-Platz, named after Gerhart Hauptmann, was renamed Ida-Ehre-Platz in 2000. In 2001, the Jahn-Schule in Eimsbüttel, Hamburg was renamed the Ida-Ehre-Gesamtschule following a second vote after a first vote had preferred the name Gesamtschule am Grindel.

== Films ==
- In Those Days (German: In jenen Tagen), 1947, Regie: Helmut Käutner, mit Willy Maertens
- The Prisoner (1949)
- You Don't Shoot at Angels (1960)
- The Dead Eyes of London (German: Die toten Augen von London), 1961, Regie: Alfred Vohrer, mit Joachim Fuchsberger
- The Gypsy Baron (1962)
- The Investigation (1966, TV film)

== Bibliography ==
- Ida Ehre, Helmut Schmidt: Gott hat einen größeren Kopf, mein Kind.... Rowohlt, Reinbek, ISBN 3-499-12160-3
- Ida Ehre, Sepp Schelz: Zeugen des Jahrhunderts. Ida Ehre. Ullstein, 1999 ISBN 3-548-33252-8
