= Europa Passage =

Coordinates: 53.5514°N 9.9967°E

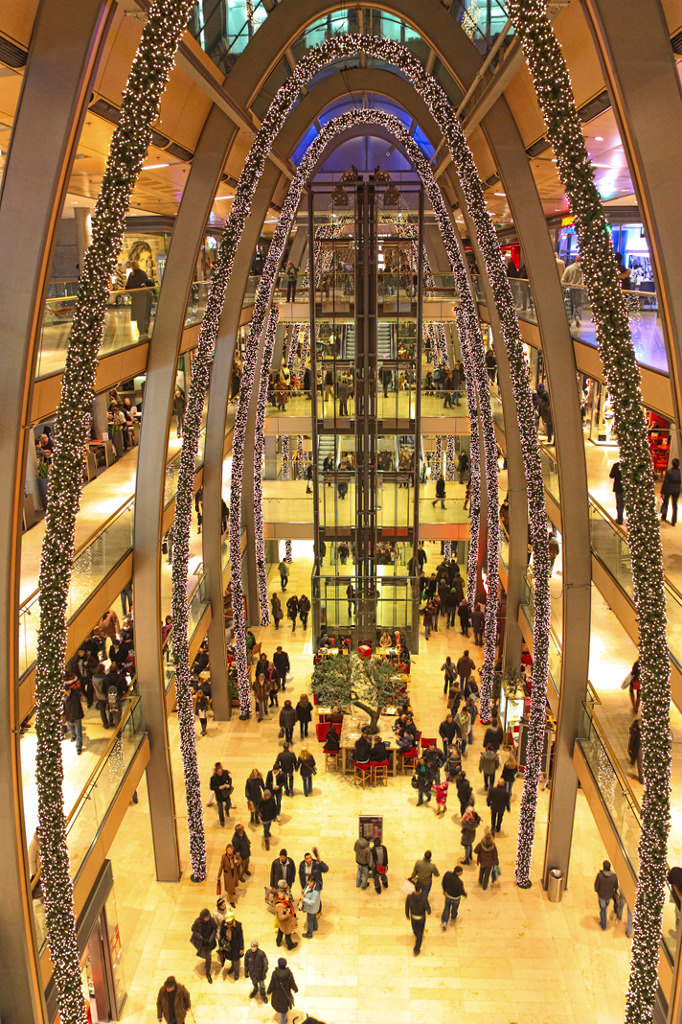
Europa Passage during Christmas in 2008

Europa Passage is a large shopping mall in the Altstadt quarter of Hamburg, Germany, located between the streets of Ballindamm/Jungfernstieg and Mönckebergstraße near the lake of Binnenalster. It was opened on 5 October 2006. Within the 5-level mall 120 shops and 27 catering outlets can be found on an overall length of around 160 metres and a space of 30,000 square metres. Another 30,000 square metres of office space are located within the building. The total investment cost of the building amounted to 430 million Euro. The building is operated by ECE Projektmanagement and owned by Alida Grundstücksgesellschaft GmbH & Co KG (Alida Real Estate Company). The passage was designed by Hadi Teherani of BRT Architects.

== Construction ==
For the construction of the passage, several buildings had to be demolished since 2003. The building excavation had a depth of 24 metres on an area of 12,000 square metres. An 80 cm diaphragm wall up to a depth of 35 metres was used to hold back the ground water from the pit. Historical buildings close to the excavation had to be protected during construction.

The passage is directly connected to Jungfernstieg station by a pedestrian tunnel.

Europa Passage won the MIPIM Awards for shopping centres in 2007.

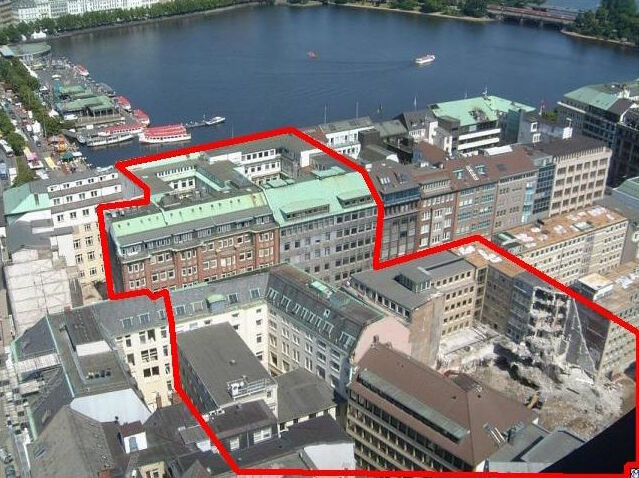
Buildings to be demolished during construction works in 2003
