= Gerhart-Hauptmann-Platz =

Square in Hamburg, Germany

Coordinates: 53.5515°N 9.9991°E

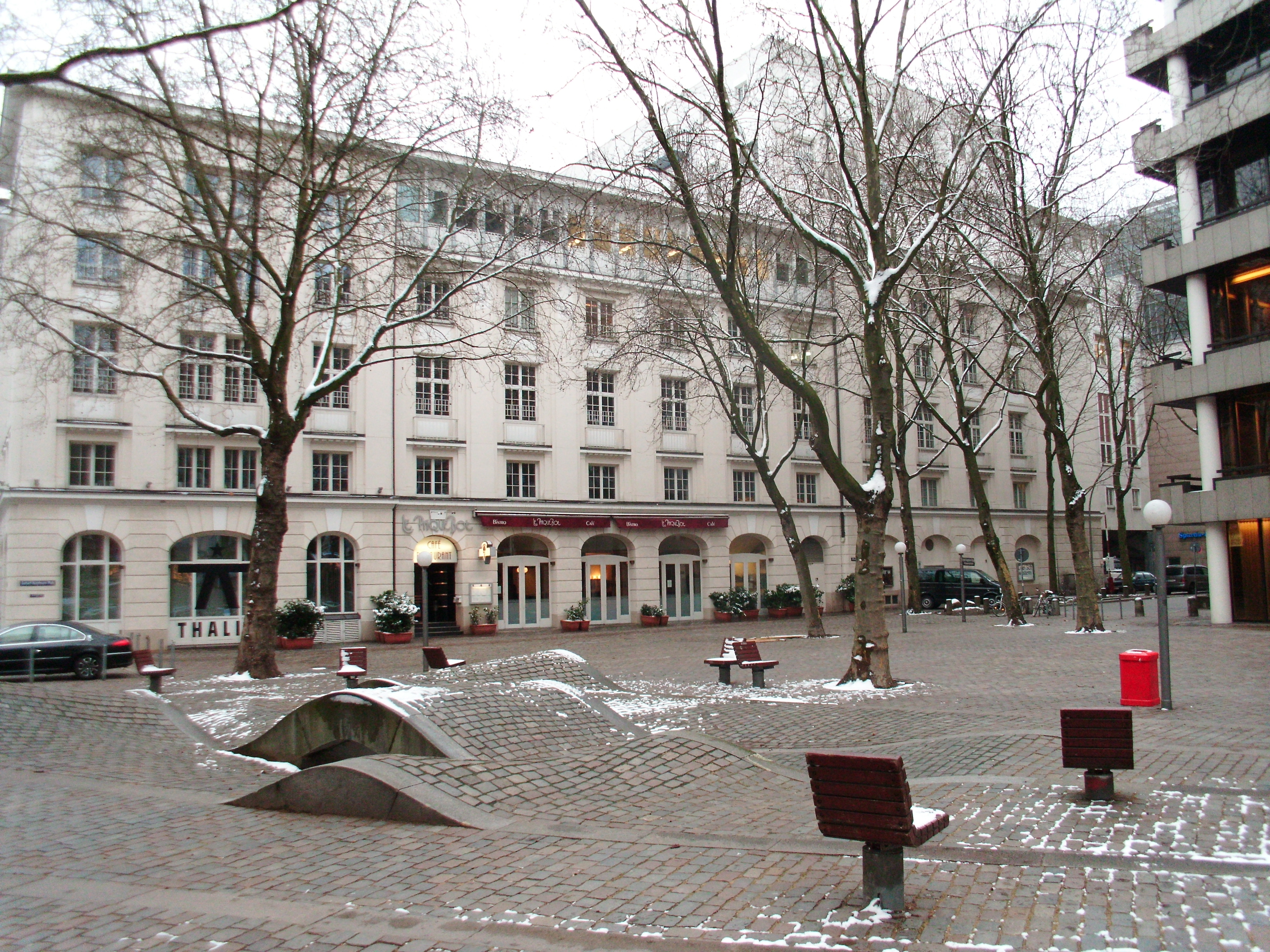
Gerhart-Hauptmann-Platz in 2011, Thalia Theater in the background

Gerhart-Hauptmann-Platz (Gerhart Hauptmann Square) is a central square in Altstadt quarter, Hamburg, Germany. The former Pferdemarkt (Horse Market) is located at the junction of the streets of Mönckebergstraße, Spitalerstraße and Alstertor. The southern part of the square was renamed into Ida-Ehre-Platz (Ida Ehre Square) on 9 July 2000, in honour of the actress and intendant of Hamburger Kammerspiele.

== History ==
The square was first mentioned in 1260 as Pferdemarkt. Horse trading was later relocated to Neuer Pferdemarkt (New Horse Market) square in St. Pauli after construction of Hamburg city walls. The square was renamed after dramatist and novelist Gerhart Hauptmann after his death in 1946. In the 1970s the square was redesigned with a wavy surface, which was partly flattened in the 2000s, because the square should be used regularly for a Christmas market and other events.

Thalia Theater is located at the square since 1843. Major retailer Karstadt has its Hamburg central department store at the corner of Gerhart-Hauptmann-Platz and Mönckebergstraße, often called Karstadt Mö by the Hamburg inhabitants.
