= Spitalerstraße =

Street in Altstadt (Hamburg), Germany

Coordinates: 53.5520°N 10.0026°E

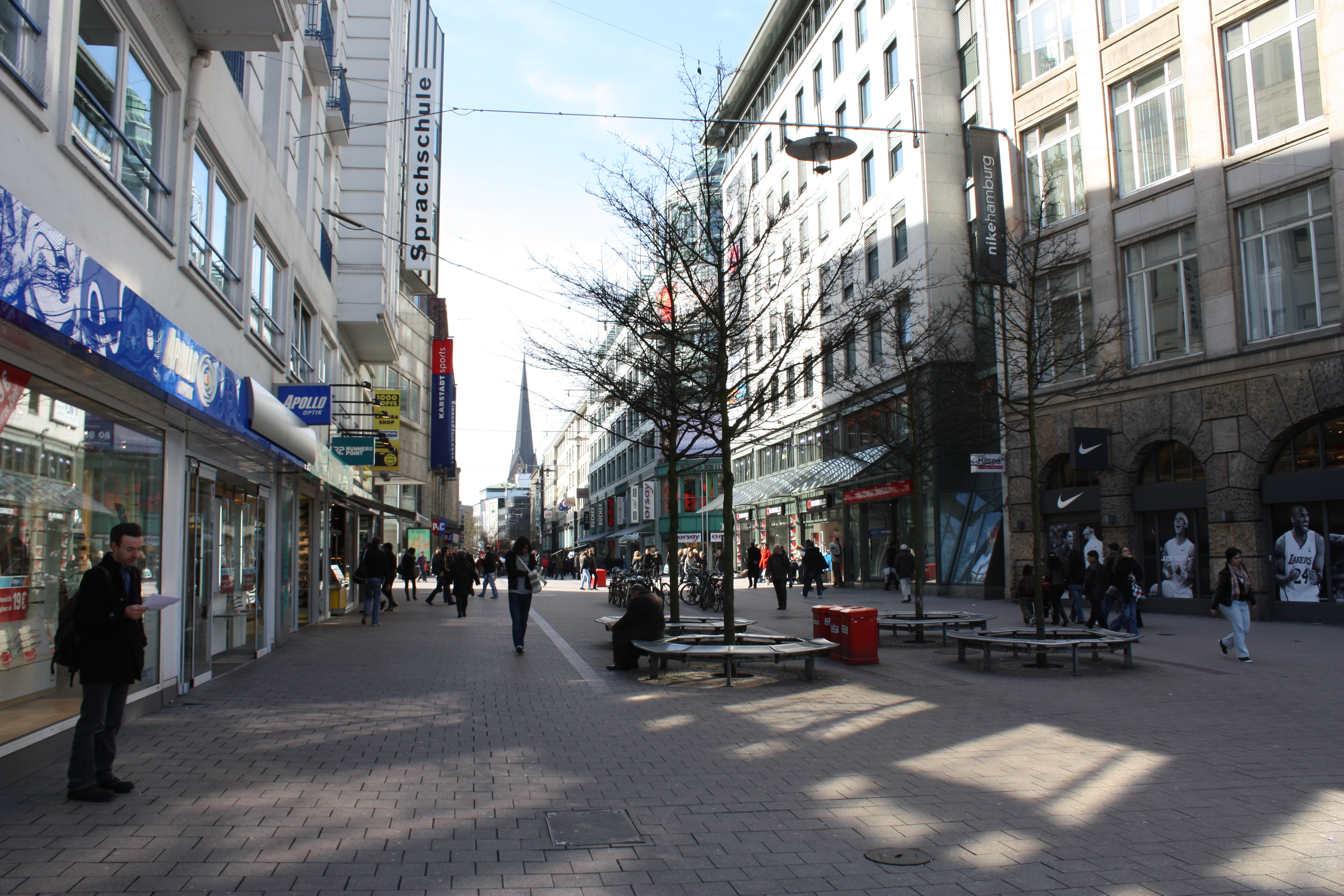
Spitalerstraße in 2009

Spitalerstraße is a shopping street in the Altstadt quarter, Hamburg, Germany. The street, a pedestrian zone, is one of the central shopping districts of the city and forms a diagonal junction from Gerhart-Hauptmann-Platz/Mönckebergstraße boulevard in the west to Hamburg Hauptbahnhof/Steintorwall in the east. It is the most frequented street by pedestrians in Hamburg - ahead nearby Mönckebergstraße - and the fifth most frequented street in Germany with 13,070 persons per hour on a Saturday by 2015.

== History ==
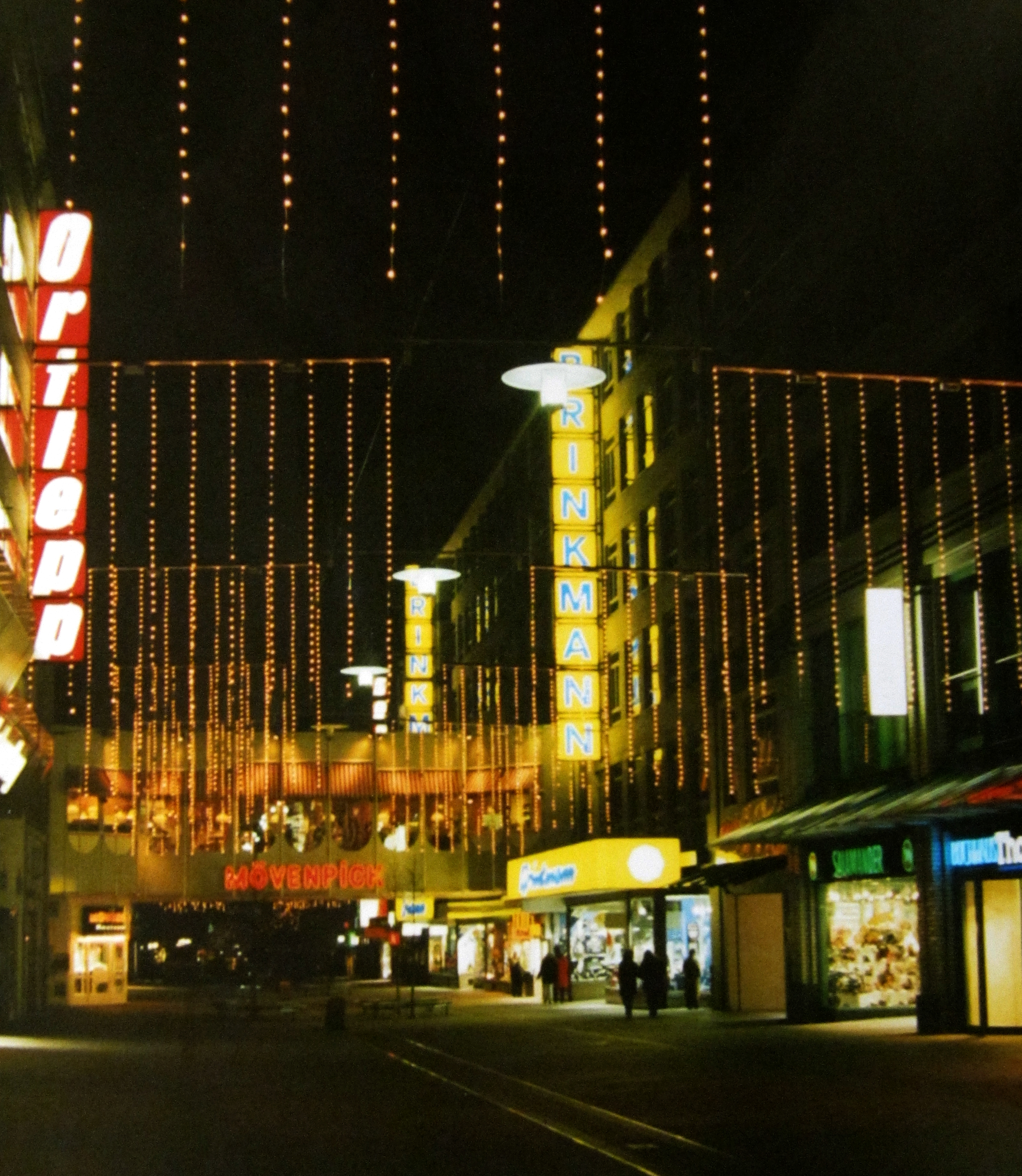
Spitalerstraße by night in 1992. A restaurant was located in the bridge which was demolished in the 2000s

The street can already be found on old city maps in the year of 1200, while it was first mentioned in 1320 as Spitalerstrate. It was the street leading from the city to the hospital of St. George outside the city walls. There was also a "Spitaler Tor", a gate leading to the hospital, at the end of the street, but it only existed until the strong fortifications of Hamburg city walls were built in 1620 by Jan van Valckenborgh. There was a hospital directly at the street, St. Hiob's Hospital, but it was built in 1509, when the street was already named.

While the houses at Spitalerstraße mostly weren't damaged in the Great Fire of Hamburg in 1842, a Cholera epidemic in 1892 led to the reconstruction of the former small and dark alleyway. Most of the merchant's buildings were constructed between 1906 and 1909. Spitalerstraße was turned into a pedestrian zone in 1968, after motorized traffic had increased and Hamburg was re-planned as a "car-friendly city", in which cars and pedestrians were separated wherever possible.
