= Ballindamm =

Street in Hamburg, Germany

Coordinates: 53.5536°N 9.9975°E

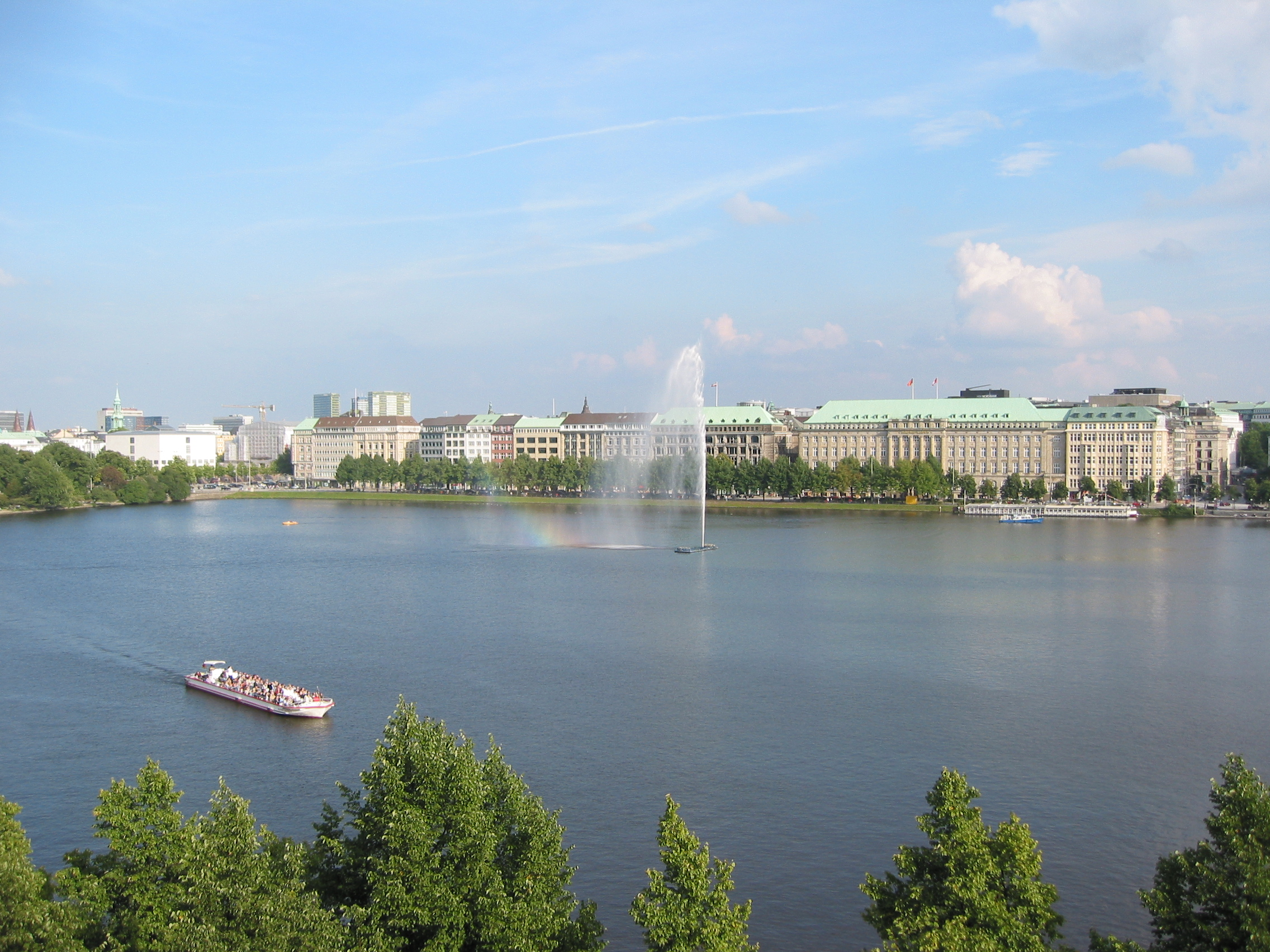
View of Ballindamm over Lake Binnenalster

The Ballindamm is an inner city boulevard of Hamburg, Germany. Located within the Altstadt quarter directly at the Binnenalster, the Ballindamm represents the connection between Jungfernstieg and Glockengießerwall. It is thus located in the heart of the city. Today, it is a four-lane alley with parking spaces on its median strip.

== History ==
Ballindamm was created after the Great Fire of 1842, then named Alsterdamm. 1947 it was renamed Ballindamm. It owes its name to the German shipowner Albert Ballin. The Hapag-Lloyd building is located at the street. Likewise, various banks - mainly private banks - have their headquarters at Ballindamm.

The Europa Passage, a large shopping mall, was completed in 2006. Entrances to Jungfernstieg transport hub are located at the street.

At Ballindamm, the military dealer André Hüsken operates his Galerie d'Histoire André Hüsken, offering antiquities.

== Gallery ==
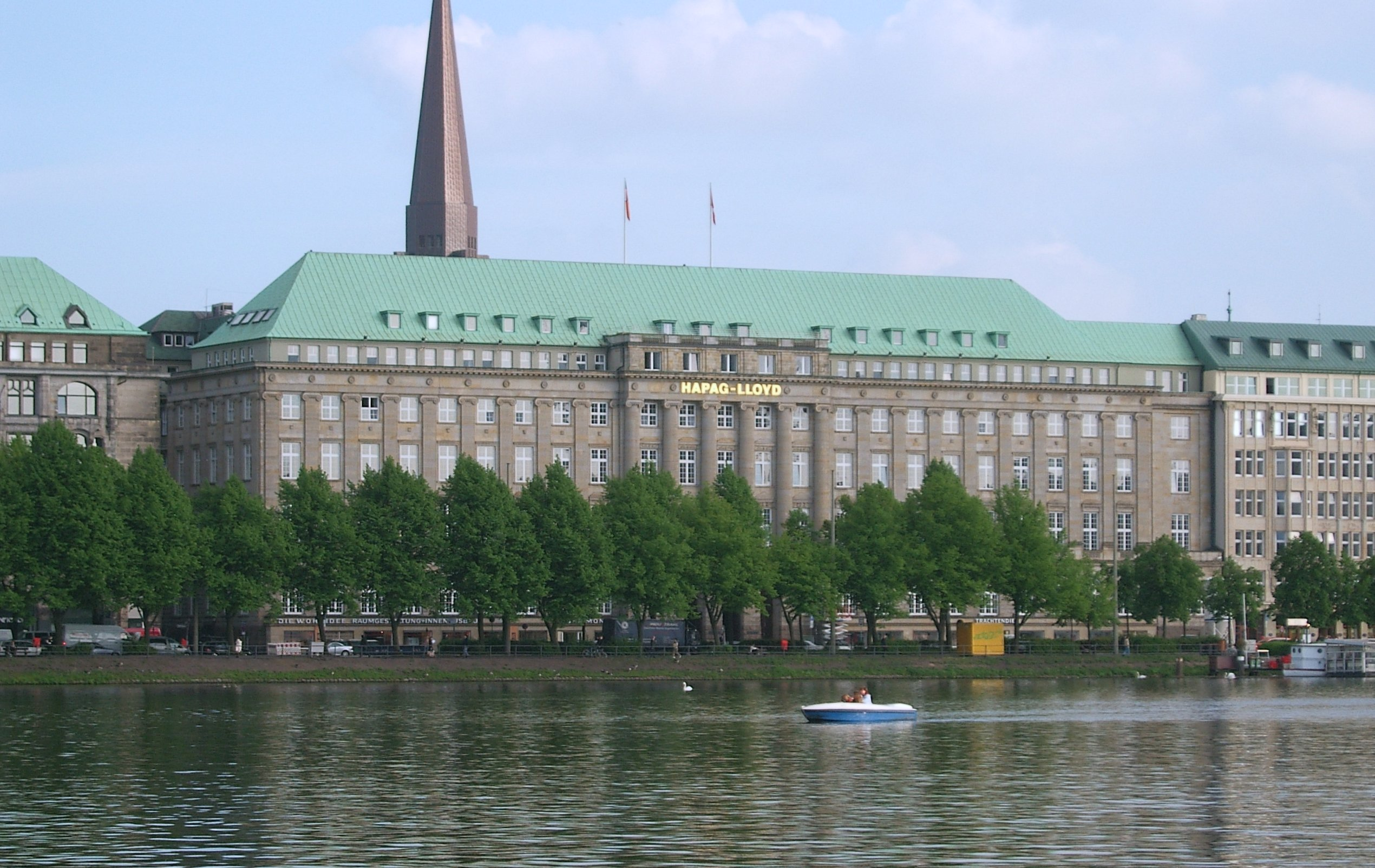
Hapag Lloyd building at Ballindamm

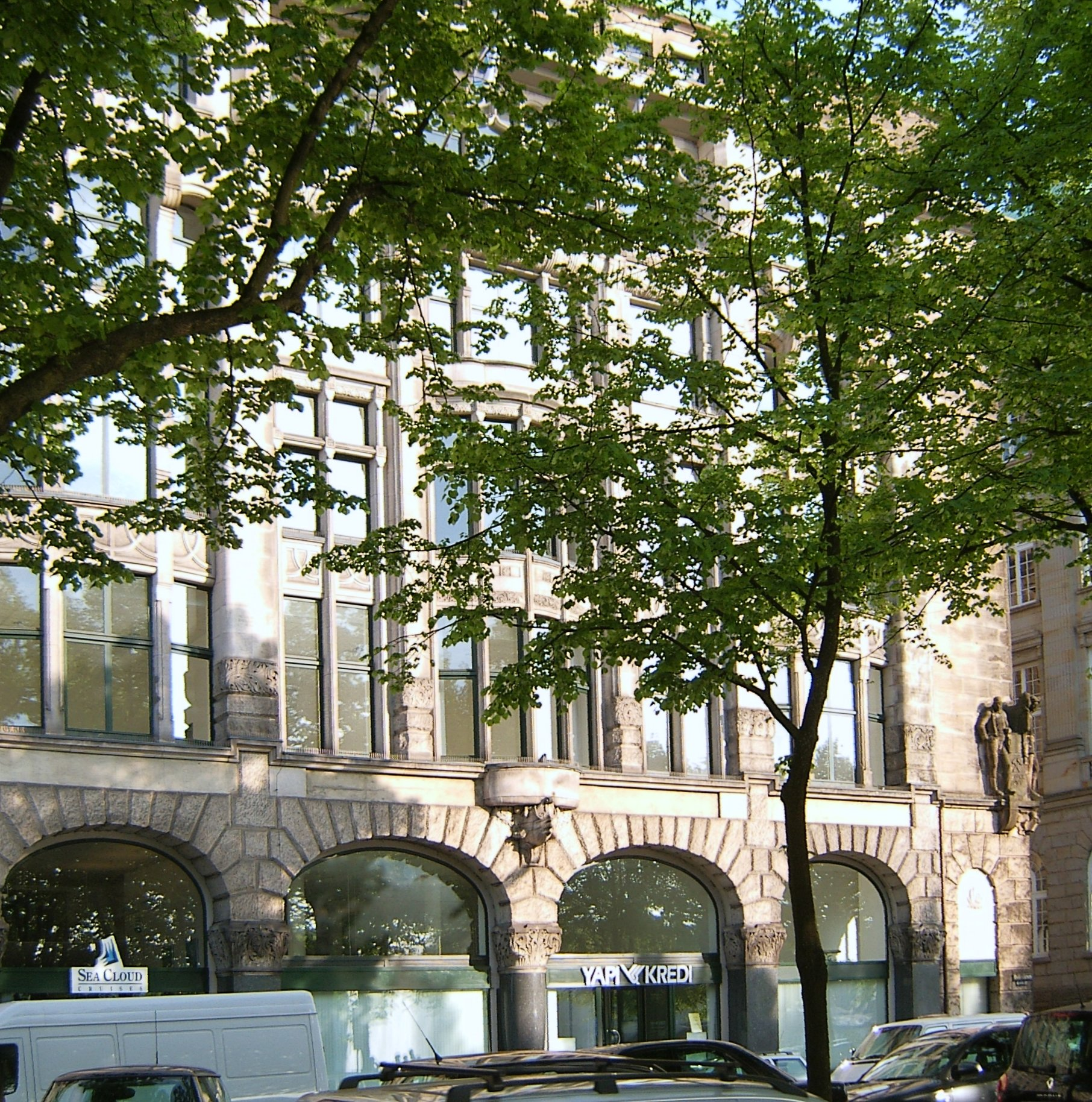
Kirdorfhaus, named after Emil Kirdorf, until 1989 seat of Seereederei "Frigga"

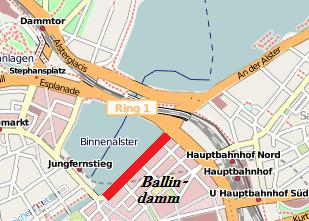
Location of Ballindamm in Hamburg
