= Thalia Theater (Hamburg) =

Theatre in Hamburg, Germany

Coordinates: 53°33′10″N 9°59′49″E

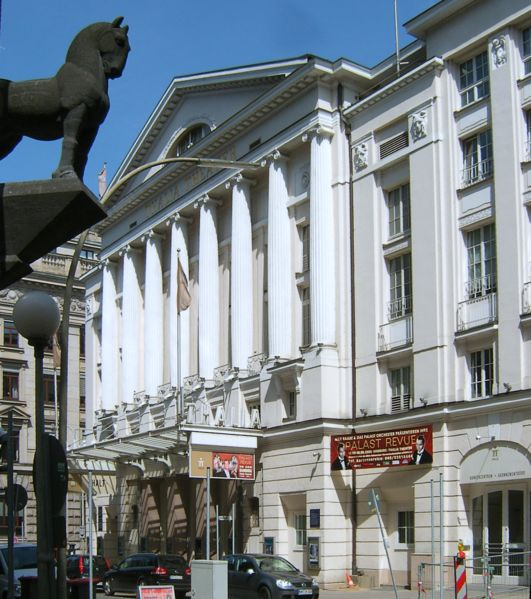
- Thalia Theater front view.
- Interactive map of Thalia Theater
- Address: Raboisen 67; Hamburg, Germany
- Owner: Free and Hanseatic City of Hamburg

Construction
- Opened: 1843

Website
- http://www.thalia-theater.de/

The Thalia Theater is one of the three state-owned theatres in Hamburg, Germany. It was founded in 1843 in a previous building by Chéri Maurice and named after the muse Thalia. Today, it is home to one of Germany's most famous ensembles and stages around 20 new plays per season. Current theatre manager is Sonja Anders, 2009/10 Joachim Lux succeeded Ulrich Khuon.

In addition to its main building, located in the street Raboisen in the Altstadt quarter near the Binnenalster and Gerhart-Hauptmann-Platz in Hamburg's inner city, the theatre operates a smaller stage, used for experimental plays, the Thalia in der Gaußstraße, located in the borough of Altona.

== Plays ==
In October 1991 Ruth Berghaus directed Bertolt Brecht's In The Jungle of Cities (German: Im Dickicht der Städte) as part of a series of 'related texts', as she called them (which also included Büchner's Danton's Death).

=== Performed by the ensemble in 2006 ===
Thalia Theater

- Sommergäste by Maxim Gorki
- Quixote in der Stadt
- Die schmutzigen Hände (Dirty Hands) by Jean-Paul Sartre
- Das Versprechen by Armin Petras, inspired by Friedrich Dürrenmatt
- Ein Mitsommernachtstraum (A Midsummer Night's Dream) by William Shakespeare
- Buddenbrooks by Thomas Mann, edited by John von Düffel
- Die Jungfrau von Orleans by Friedrich Schiller
- Effi Briest by Theodor Fontane
- Penthesilea by Heinrich von Kleist, in cooperation with the Salzburg Festival
- Rose Bernd by Gerhart Hauptmann
- Lulu by Frank Wedekind
- Der Bus (Das Zeug einer Heiligen] by Lukas Bärfuss
- Mnozil Brass
- Minna von Barnhelm (Minna of Barnhelm) by Gotthold Ephraim Lessing
- Klein Zaches genannt Zinnober by Stefan Moskov, inspired by E.T.A. Hoffmann
- Ulrike Maria Stuart by Elfriede Jelinek

Thalia in der Gaußstraße

Performed by the theatre's ensemble in 2006

- Café Umberto by Moritz Rinke
- Zeit zu Lieben Zeit zu Sterben by Fritz Kater
- Dies ist kein Liebeslied by Karen Duve
- Das Ende vom Anfang by Seán O'Casey
- Antigone by Sophocles
- Liebesruh by Jan Neumann
- Bartleby, der Schreiber by Herman Melville
- Sauerstoff by Iwan Wyrypajew
- Norway.Today by Igor Bauersima
- WE ARE CAMERA/JASONMATERIAL by Fritz Kater
- Limited Edition: Das Wunder von St. Georg by Peer Paul Gustavsson
- Ware Liebe
- Hinter euren Zäunen
- Durchgebrannt by Ursula Rani Sarma
- Kick & Rush by Andri Beyeler
- Abalon, One Nite in Bangkok by Fritz Kater
- Z by Nino Haratischwili
- Mein Kampf by George Tabori

== Criticism for pro-Russian activities ==
In 2022, during the Russian war against Ukraine, the theater drew strong criticism from the Ukrainian community of Germany for showing a play by the Russian playwright Kirill Serebrennikov which glamourizes the genocide, whitewashes Russian war crimes and equates the victims with the criminals.
