= Trams in Hamburg =

Overview of the tram system of Hamburg, Germany

Coordinates: 53°33′01″N 09°59′32″E

Hamburg tramway network
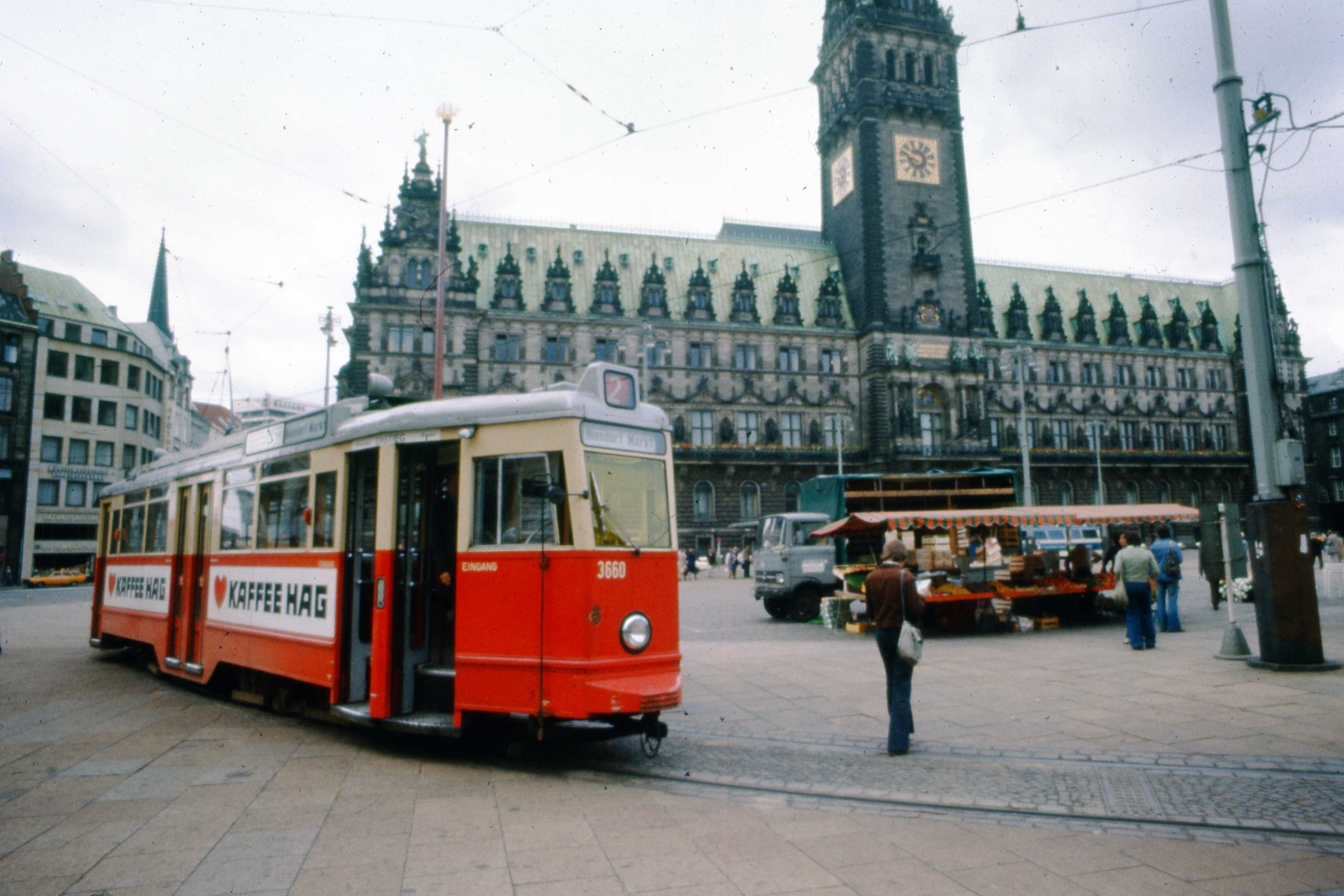
- A tram of line 2 in the Rathausmarkt, 1975

Operation
- Locale: Hamburg, Germany

Statistics
Horsecar era: 1866–1922
- Status: Closed
- Operators: Pferde-Eisenbahn Gesellschaft (1866–1881); Hamburg-Altonaer Pferdebahn (1878–1896); Straßen Eisenbahn Gesellschaft (1880–1919)
- Track gauge: 1,435 mm (4 ft 8 1/2 in) standard gauge
- Propulsion system: Horses
- Route length: 1879: 28 km 1881: 66 km 1896: 100 km 1909: 167.17 km
Steam tramway era: 1878–1897
- Status: Closed
- Operators: Pferde-Eisenbahn Gesellschaft (1878–1880); Straßen Eisenbahn Gesellschaft (1880–1897)
- Track gauge: 1,435 mm (4 ft 8 1/2 in) standard gauge
- Propulsion system: Steam power
- Route length: 1879: 28 km (17 mi); 1881: 66 km (41 mi); 1896: 100 km (62 mi)
Electric tram era: 1894–1978
- Status: Closed
- Routes: 1955: 19; 1965: 11; 1970: 10; 1974: 5; 1978: 1 (line number 2)
- Operators: Hamburger Hochbahn (1920–1978)
- Track gauge: 1,435 mm (4 ft 8 1/2 in) standard gauge
- Propulsion system: Electricity
- Electrification: 500 V DC overhead line (initially); 550 V DC (later)
- Route length: 1909: 167.17 km (103.87 mi), 1955: 217 km (135 mi)
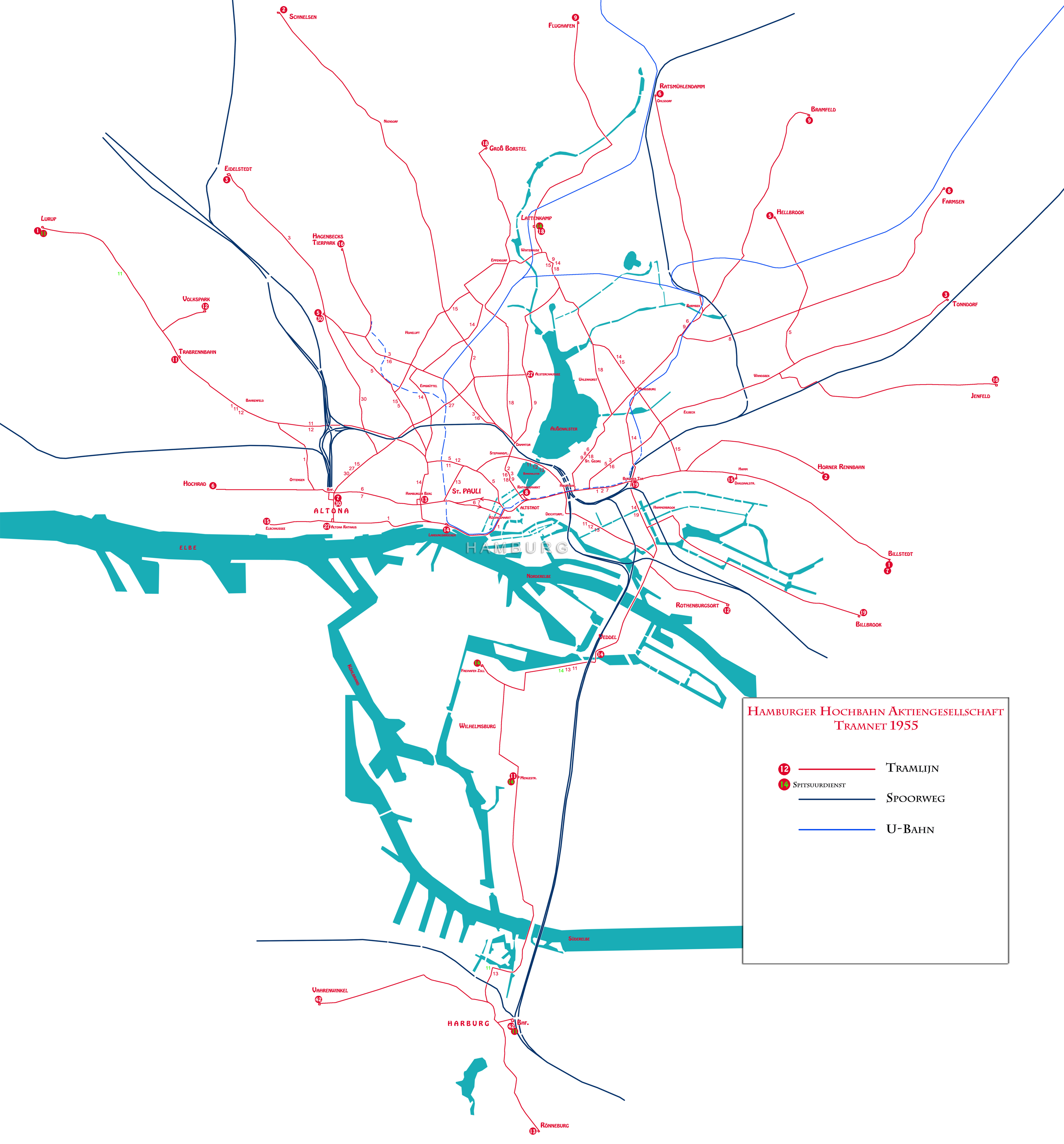
- Hamburg tramway network, 1955.
- Website: http://www.hochbahn.de Hamburger Hochbahn (in German)

The Hamburg tramway network (German: Straßenbahnnetz Hamburg) once formed part of the public transport system in the city and federal state of Hamburg, Germany. Opened in 1866, the network lasted until 1978.

== Overview ==
Hamburg's first tram service was with horsecars, beginning on 16 August 1866. Operation of steam-powered trams began on 13 May 1878 and continued until 1897, while horsecar service continued on some lines (with the last one surviving until 1922).

Electric tram service was introduced on 5 March 1894 and continued until 1978, with the system closing on 1 October 1978.

== Proposed 21st century system ==
A similar style of transport, light rail, was to have been provided by the Hamburg Stadtbahn project, but following the Hamburg state election, 2011, the newly elected First Mayor of Hamburg, Olaf Scholz, announced that that project would not be going ahead.

== See also ==
- List of town tramway systems in Germany
- Trams in Germany
- Hamburg U-Bahn
- Hamburg S-Bahn
- Transport in Hamburg
