= Das Schiff =

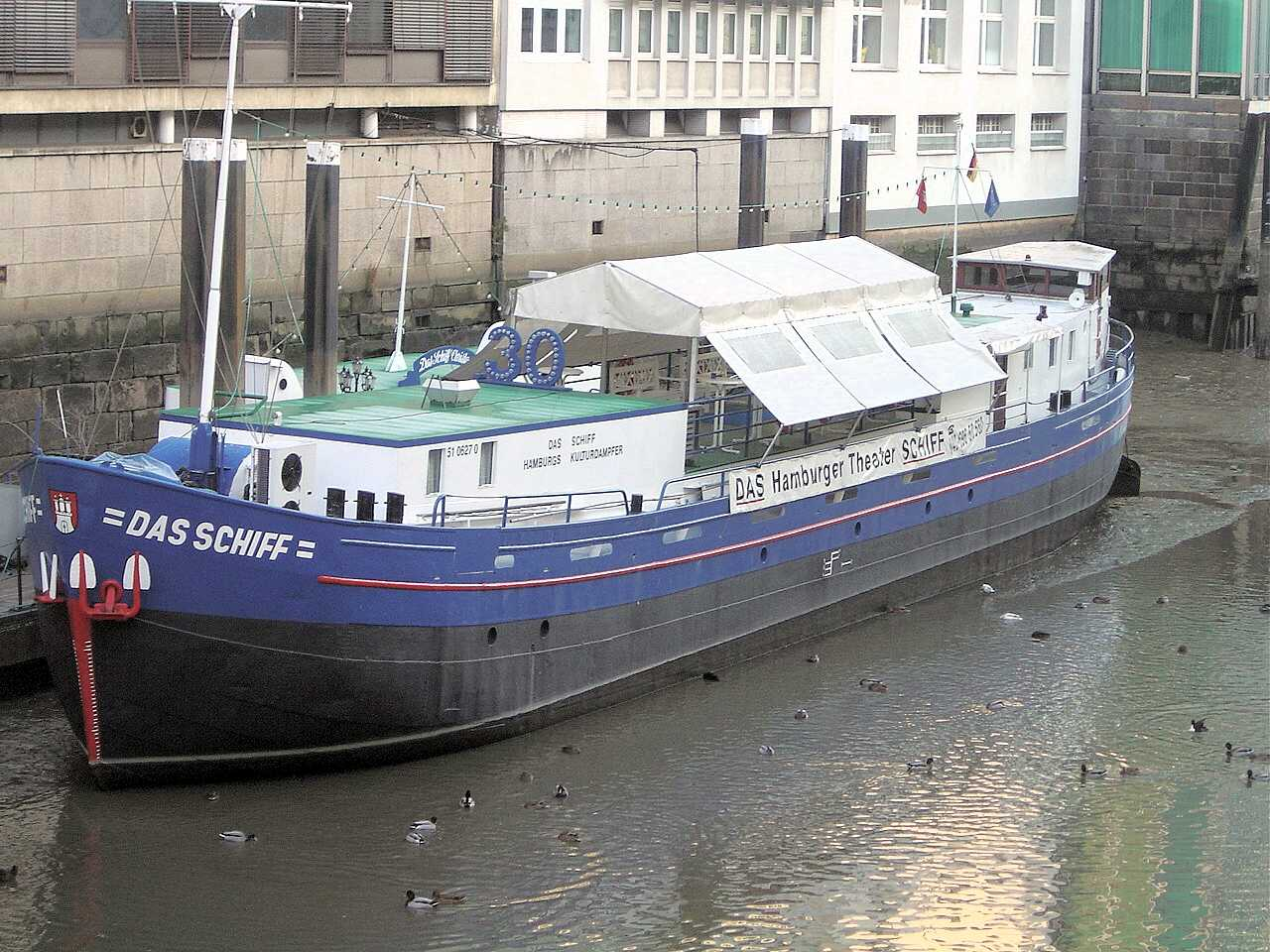
- An image of Das Schiff
- Interactive map of Das Schiff
- Address: Hamburg
- Coordinates: 53°32′48″N 9°59′24″E

Construction
- Built: 1912
- Opened: 1975

Website
- www.theaterschiff.de

Das Schiff, also known as Das Theaterschiff, is a theatre in Hamburg, Germany, established by Eberhard and Christa Möbius in 1975. It is known as the only ocean-going theatre in Europe.
