= Rathausmarkt =

Square in Hamburg, Germany

Coordinates: 53.5508°N 9.9931°E

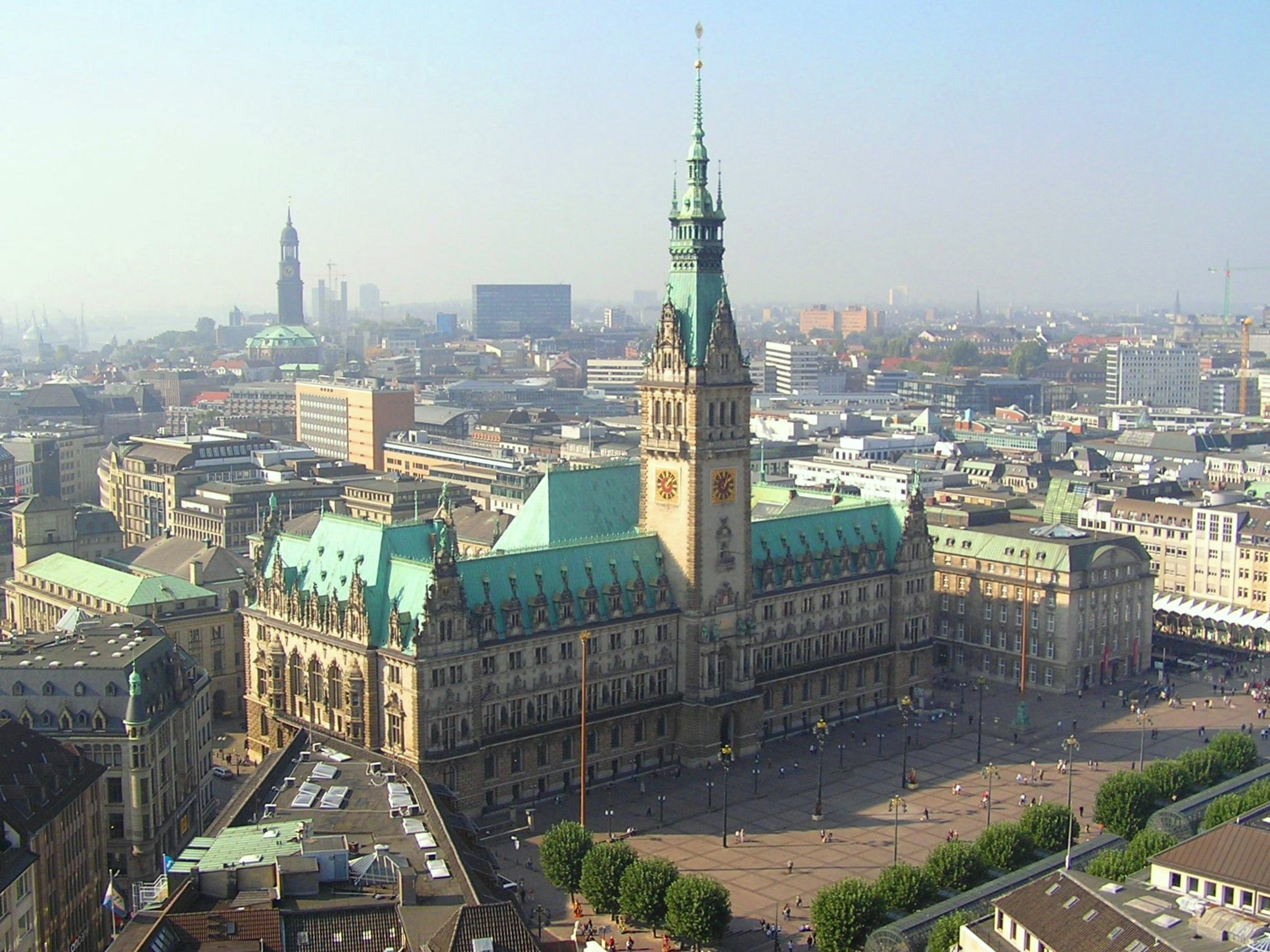
Rathausmarkt in 2005

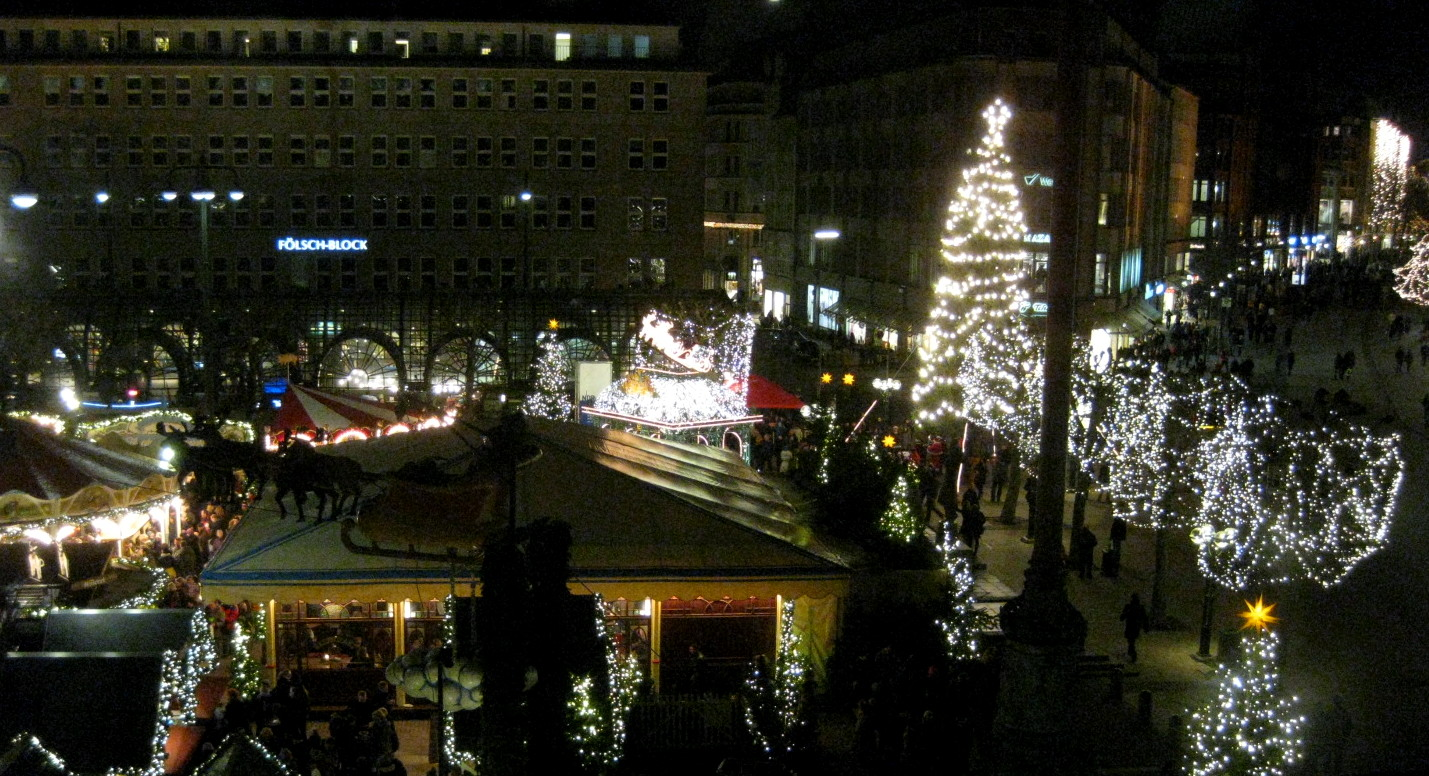
Christmas market in 2010

Rathausmarkt (lit. City Hall Marketplace) is the central square of Hamburg, Germany, located in the Altstadt (old town) quarter right in front of the Hamburg Rathaus. Framed by shopping arcades of Alsterarkaden at Alsterfleet, there are many events taking place here, amongst them open air cinema in summer, the Stuttgarter Weindorf (Stuttgart wine village), the music festival of Rockspektakel, and the Christmas market in December.

== History ==
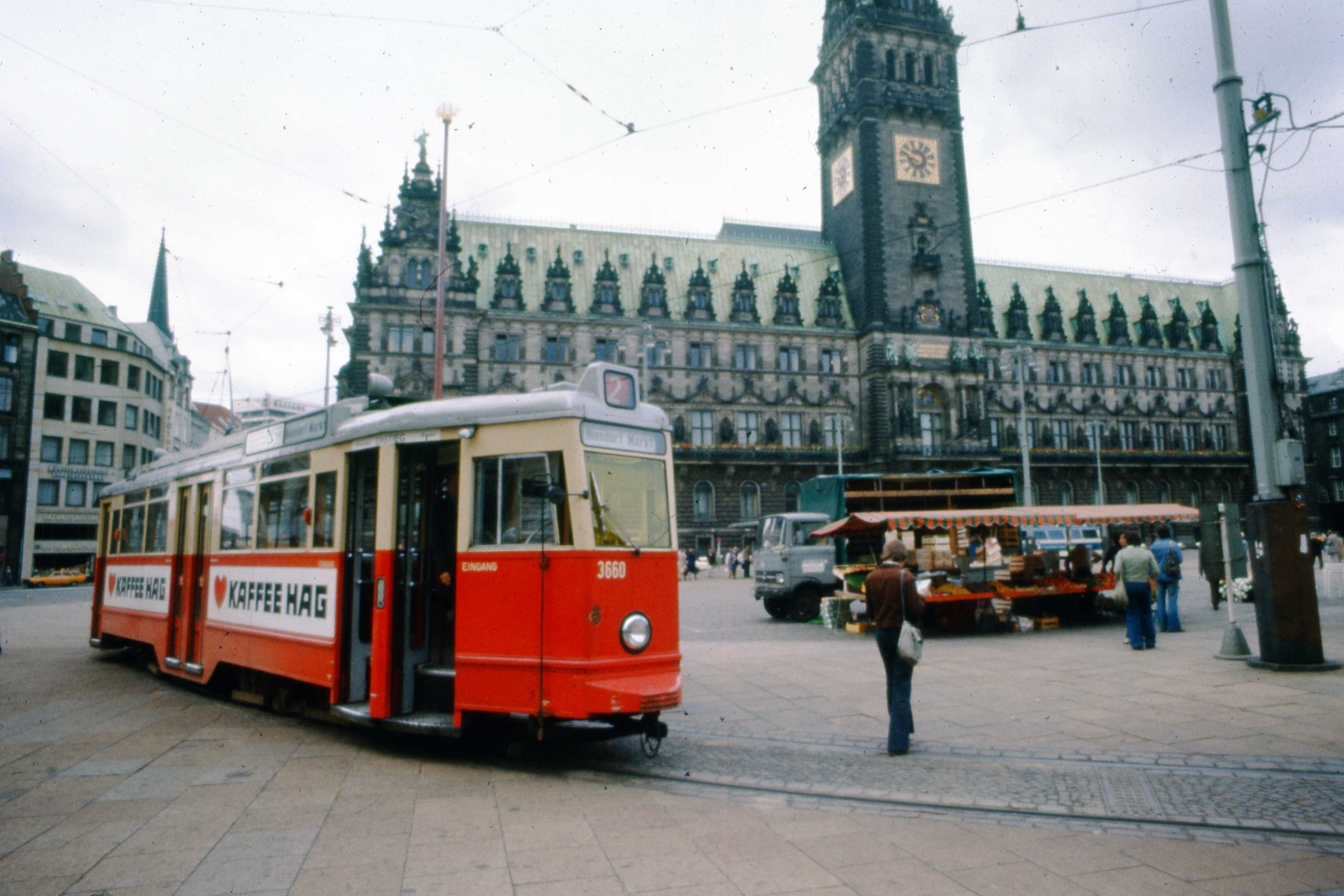
Tram on the Rathausmarkt in 1975

The Rathausmarkt was built after the Great Fire of Hamburg in 1842, which destroyed also the old city hall near the bridge of Trostbrücke and the buildings near the new city hall, with the exception of the building of Hamburg Stock Exchange. Shortly before the fire, the old St. John's monastery and also the old church of St. John, located on the southern end of the square, which were situated in the area of today's Rathausmarkt, had been demolished. The square was created pursuing a plan and designed after the model of Piazza San Marco in Venice, which is also opening to the waterfront. The new city hall was completed in 1897.

In 1933, the Rathausmarkt had been renamed to Adolf-Hitler-Platz (Adolf Hitler square), as many squares and streets in Germany at that time. It was renamed after the end of World War II in 1945. Until the 1970s the square was a transport hub for the Trams in Hamburg. After tram operation had ceased in 1978, the square was fully renovated and surfaced with red granite until 1982 under the aegis of mayor Hans-Ulrich Klose, wherefore it was jokingly dubbed Red Square.

== Monuments ==
The former monument for William I, which had been erected on the square in 1903, was removed in 1930. The remaining parts can be found at Holstenwall/Sievekingplatz today. The two large flagpoles are remnants of this ensemble.

Also today, the Heinrich Heine Monument, made by Waldemar Otto, can be found on the square. Hannes Wader wrote a song about in 1989.
