= Altstadt, Hamburg =

Altstadt
- Quarter of Hamburg
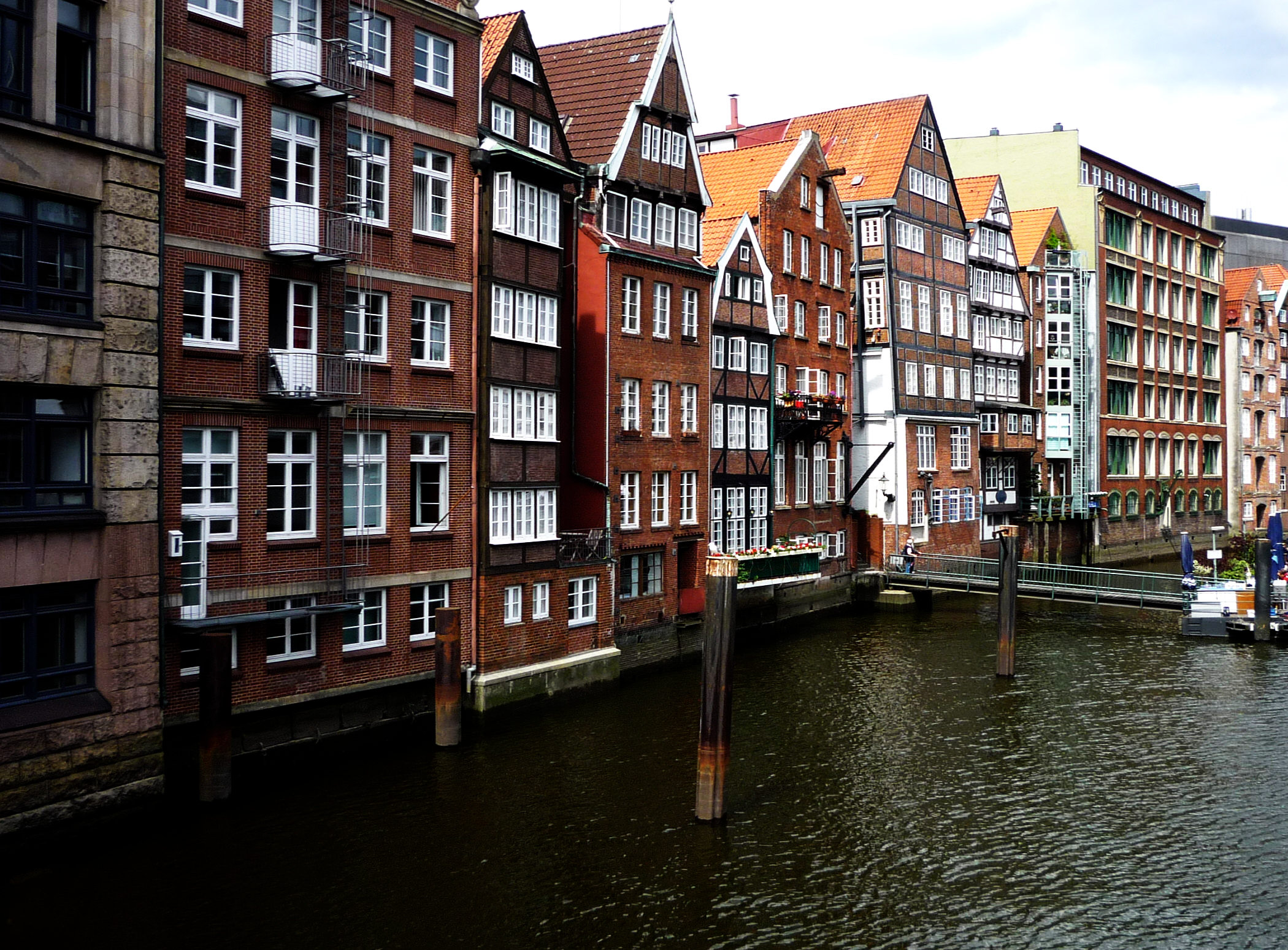
- Nikolaifleet, one of a few remaining canals in Hamburg-Altstadt

- Location of Altstadt within Hamburg-Mitte
- Interactive map of Altstadt
- Location within Germany Location within Hamburg
- Coordinates: 53°33′N 10°0′E
- Country: Germany
- State: Hamburg
- City: Hamburg
- Borough: Hamburg-Mitte

Area
  - Total: 1.2 km^{2} (0.46 sq mi)
- Elevation: 8 m (26 ft)

Population (2024-12-31)
  - Total: 2,549
  - Density: 2,100/km^{2} (5,500/sq mi)
- Time zone: UTC+01:00 (CET)
  - Summer (DST): UTC+02:00 (CEST)
- Dialling codes: 040
- Vehicle registration: HH
- Website: www.hamburg.de

UNESCO World Heritage Site
- Official name: Speicherstadt and Kontorhaus District with Chilehaus
- Criteria: Cultural: (iv)
- Reference: 1467
- Inscription: 2015 (39th Session)
- Area: 26.08 ha (64.4 acres)
- Buffer zone: 56.17 ha (138.8 acres)

Altstadt (German pronunciation: [ˈaltˌʃtat], lit. 'Old town'), more precisely Hamburg-Altstadt is one of the inner-city districts of the Free and Hanseatic City of Hamburg, Germany.

== History ==
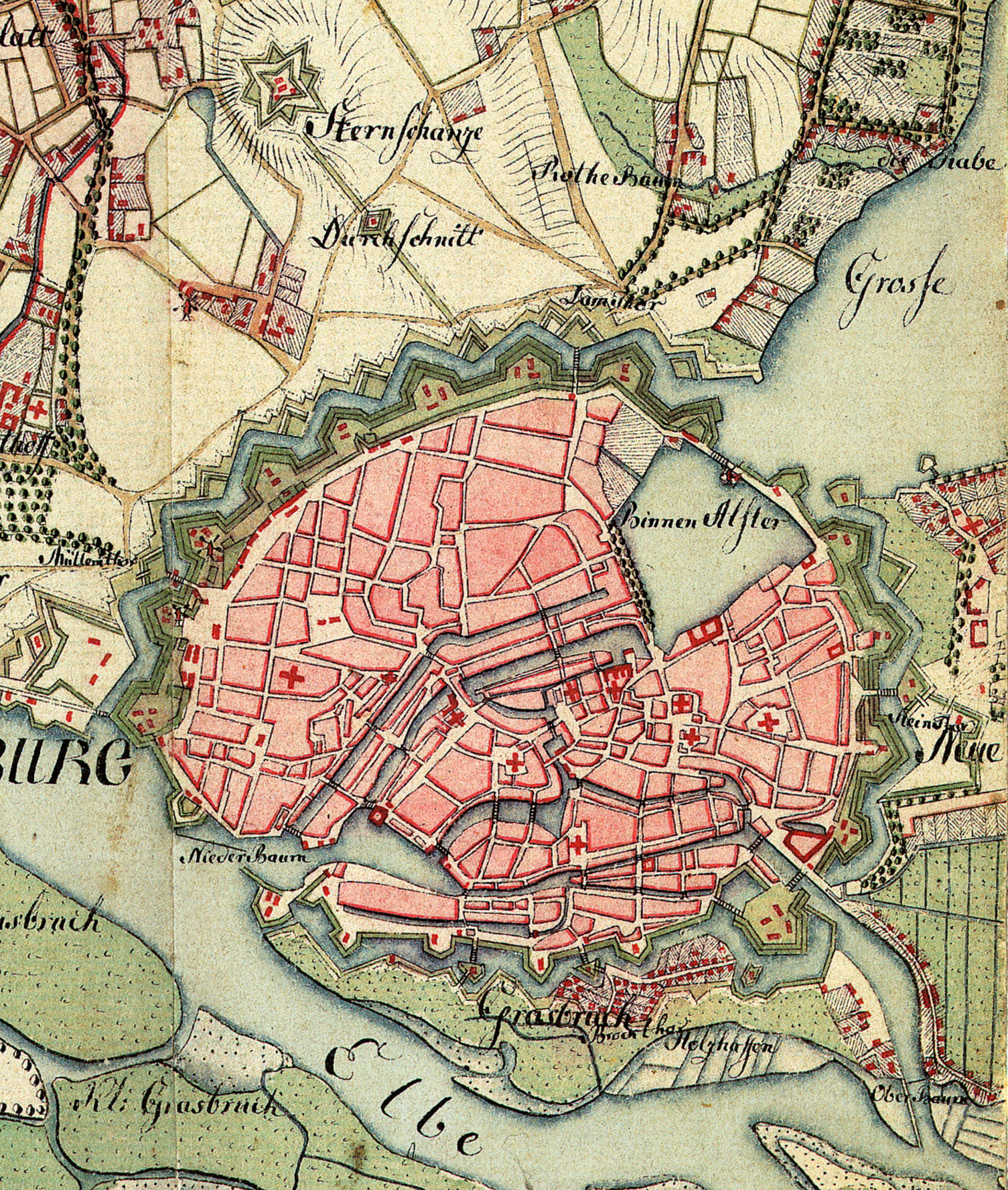
Detail of a 1790s map of Hamburg

The area of today's Altstadt had a minor Bronze Age settlement dating from the 9th or 8th century BC. An Ingaevonian settlement at this location was known by the name "Treva" – a strategic trading node on amber routes during Iron Age and Late Antiquity.

In the 8th century CE, Saxon merchants established what was to become the nucleus of Hamburg: the "Hammaburg", then a refuge fort located at today's Domplatz, the site of the former cathedral. Under Frankish rule, a baptistery was installed in 804 and Hammaburg strengthened by Charlemagne in 811. Quickly, the place grew to a sizable market town, declared a bishop's see in 831, an archbishop's see a year later. For the next 600 years, the history of Altstadt was equivalent to the history of Hamburg.

By the end of the 15th century, the then Hanseatic city-republic and free Imperial city had accumulated various territorial possessions in its hinterland. Eventually, Hamburg's 13th-century city-walls received a couple of extensions: first in the 1530s, then again in the 1620s to include all of adjacent Neustadt.

Regarding the urban history of Altstadt, only a few structures prior to the 17th century are left: repeated damming and diverting of the Alster and its canals, the Great Fire (1842), the bombing in World War II (1941–1945) and modern infrastructure projects (particularly during the 1880s to 1900s, 1920s and 1950s to 1970s) left Hamburg's inner-city with a mainly 19th and 20th-century built environment.

== Geography ==
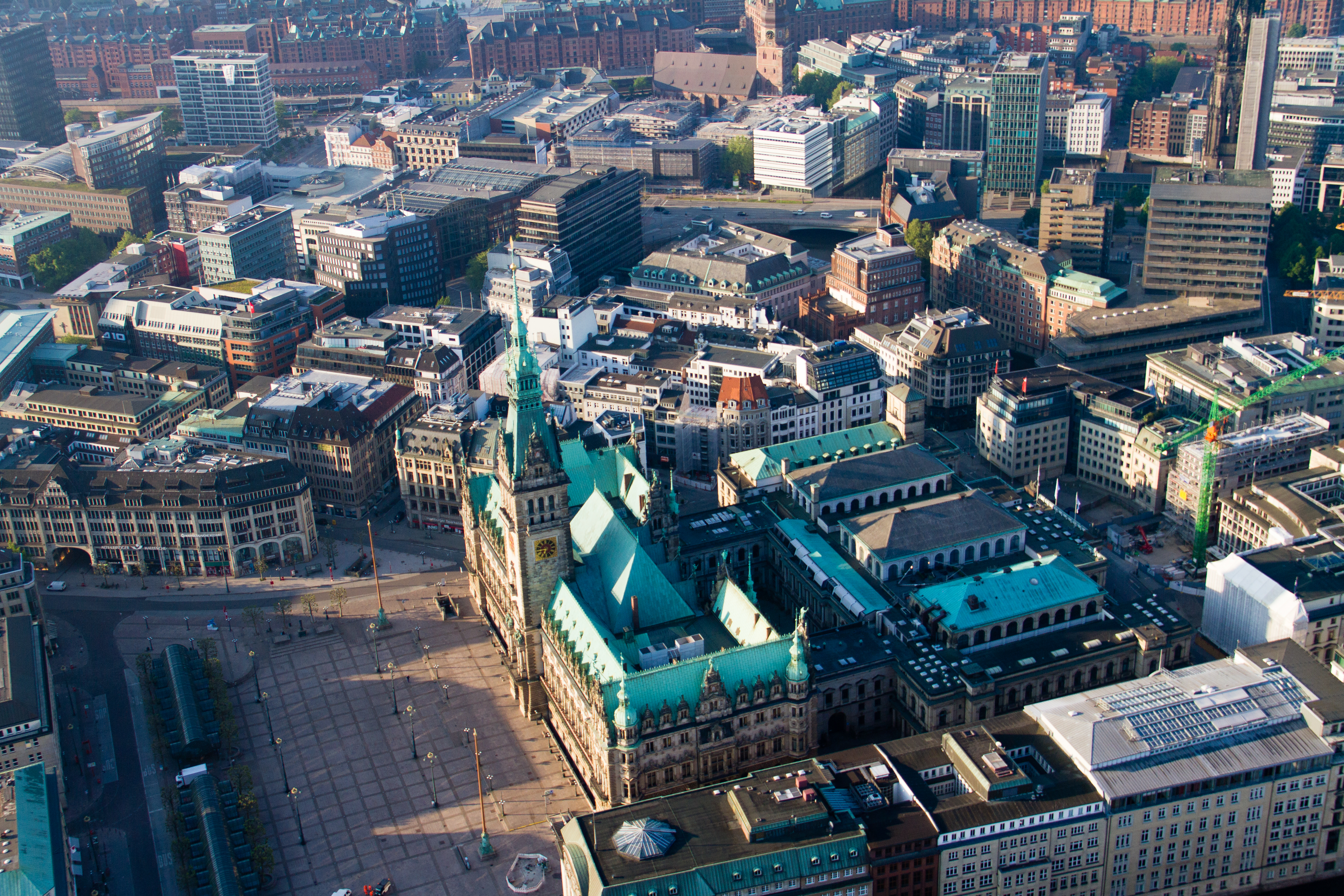
Aerial view of Rathaus (center), Rathausmarkt (left) and Chamber of Commerce (right)

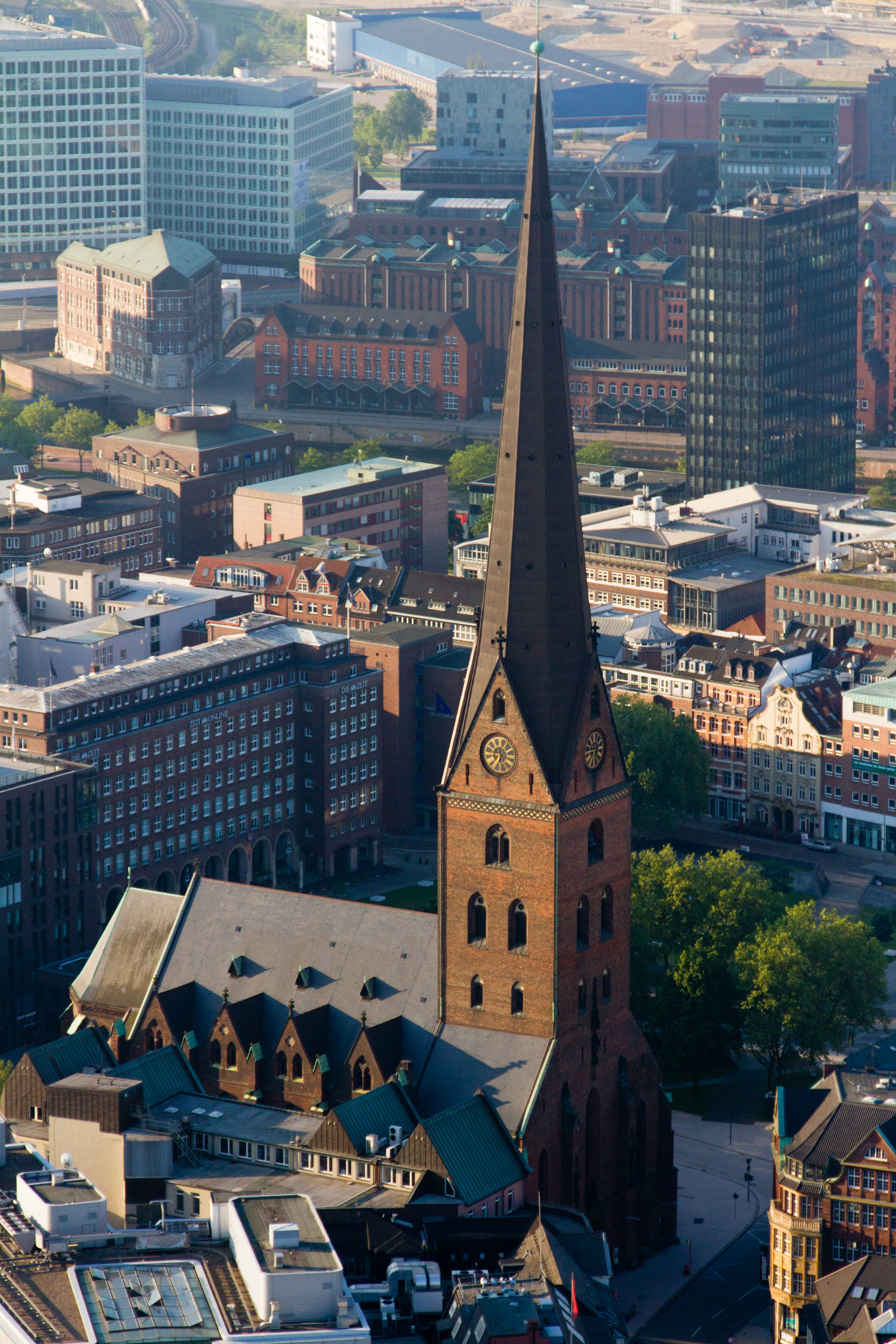
Aerial view of St. Petri

The Hammaburg, Hamburg's origin, was established on a former headland, between the confluences of Alster and Bille into the Elbe Stream. Over the centuries Alster and Bille were impoldered and diverted several times, resulting in an ever different geography. Today, Altstadt is bordered by Alster (i.e. Alsterfleet and Binnenalster) to the West and North-West, the rail tracks of Hamburg-Altona link line and Hauptbahnhof to the East, and Zollkanal to the South.

Districts bordering Hamburg-Altstadt are (starting clockwise in the North-West): Neustadt, St. Georg, Hammerbrook and HafenCity.

=== Subdivisions ===
Hamburg-Altstadt has four designated quarters (German: Viertel, or specifically used in Hamburg: Quartier) for statistical and planning purposes, however not recognized as administrative subdivisions.

Map	Quarter	Description
	Cremon Island; Cremon-Insel	Historic district, in parts also mixed use; located between Binnenhafen and Nikolaifleet.
	Kontorhaus District; Kontorhausviertel	Office district, erected in the 1920s and 1930s as the first of its kind in Europe; located between the Speicherstadt's end at Zollkanal and Steinstraße. On the tentative list as an UNESCO World Heritage Site.
	Nikolai-Quartier	Shopping and banking district nestled between Alsterfleet, Cremon Island and Rathausmarkt. Named after St. Nikolai.
	Mönckeberg-Quartier	Shopping district spanning between Ballindamm and Steinstraße, and reaching up to Rathausmarkt. Named after central Mönckebergstraße, also includes shopping street of Spitalerstraße.

=== Streets and squares ===
The single most important square in Altstadt is Rathausmarkt, both by location and function. It is the starting point of Alter Wall, Reesendamm/Ballindamm, Mönckebergstraße and Große Johannisstraße/Großer Burstah, all important streets in Altstadt. Other important squares in Altstadt include Burchardplatz, Domplatz, Gerhart-Hauptmann-Platz, and Hopfenmarkt.

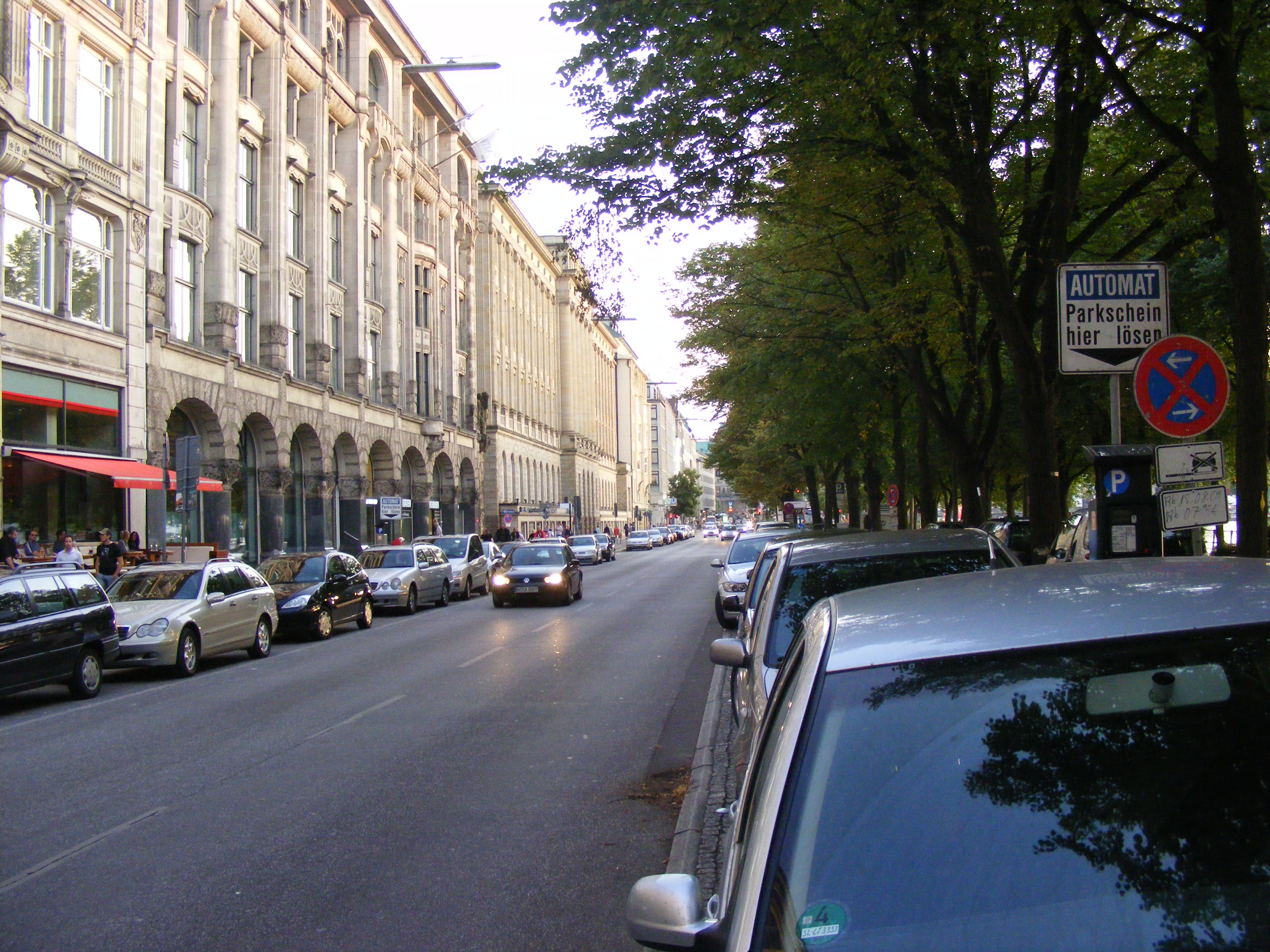
Ballindamm

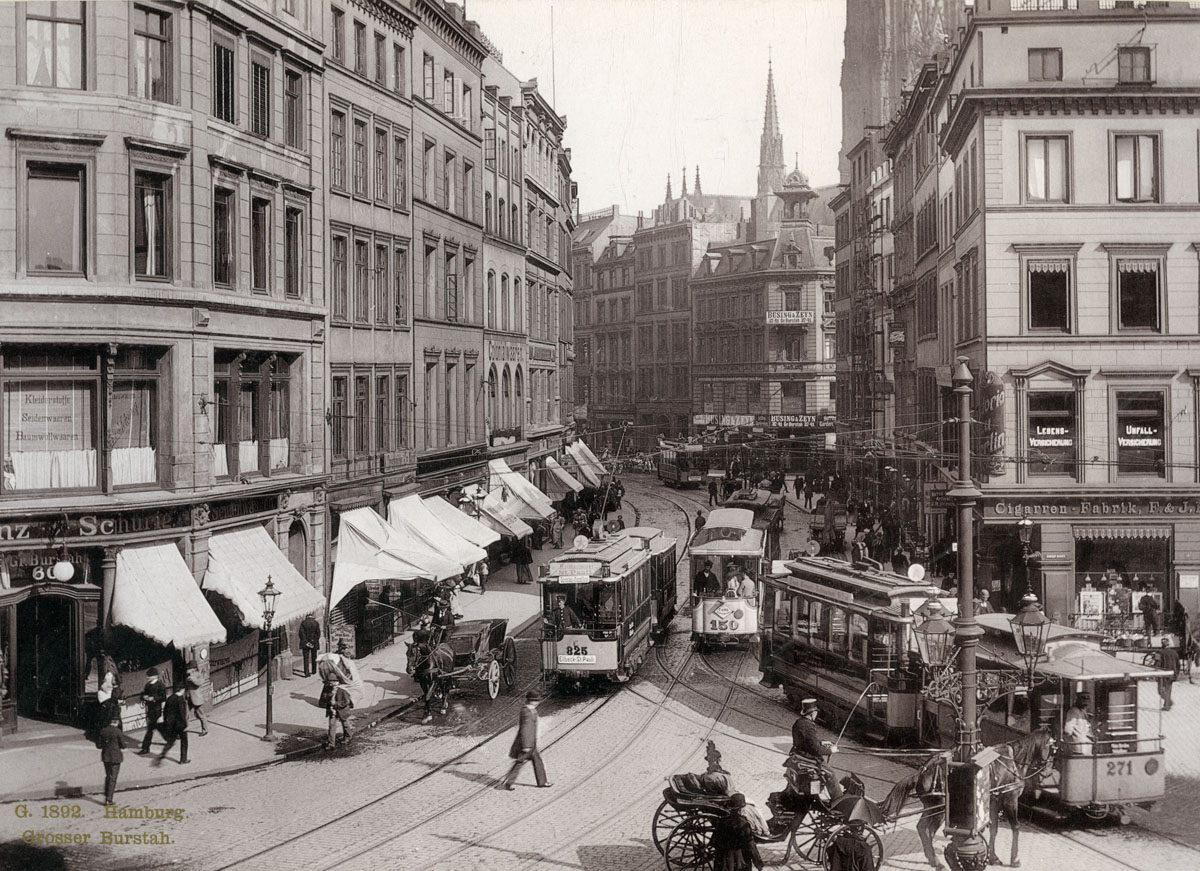
Großer Burstah

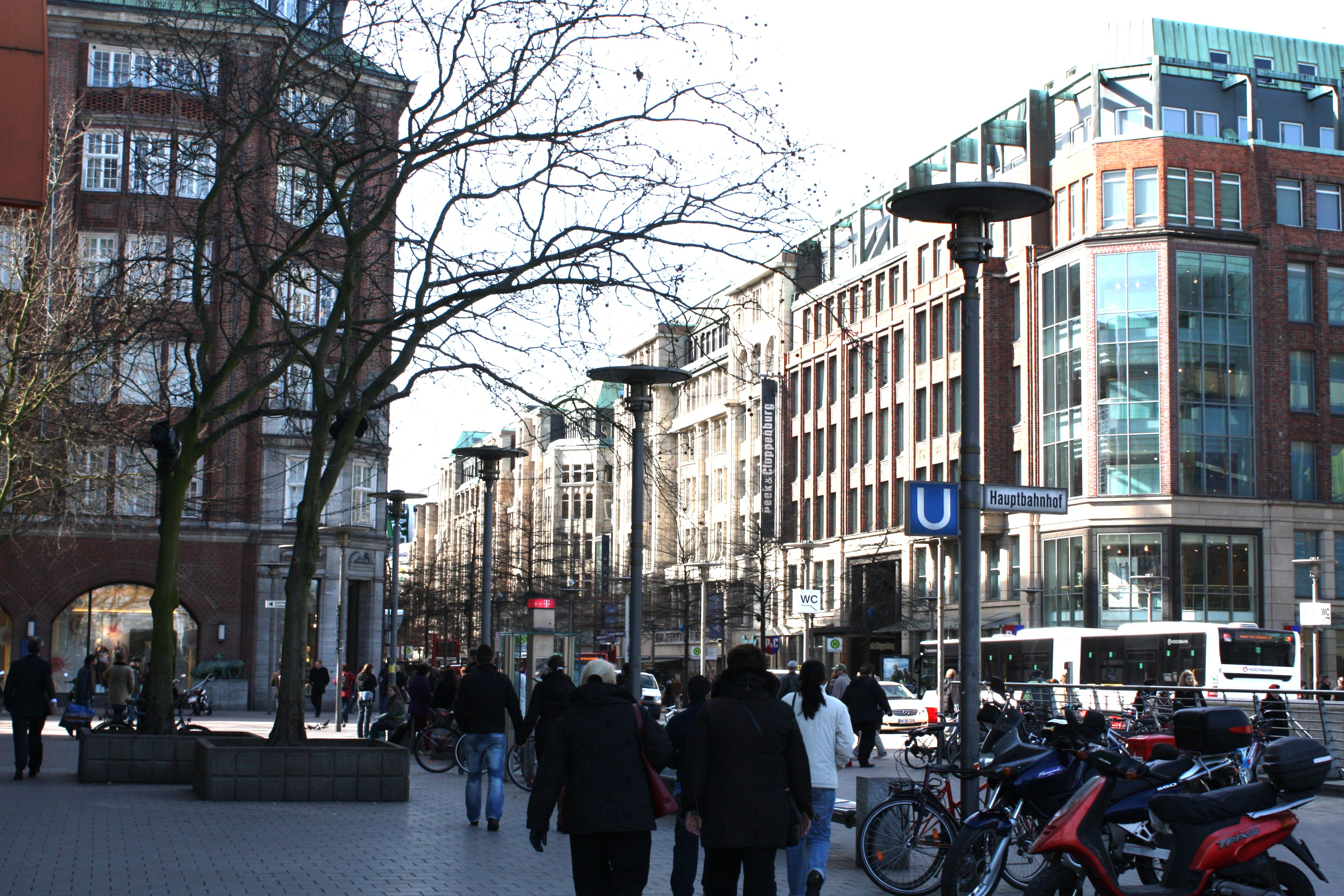
Mönckebergstraße

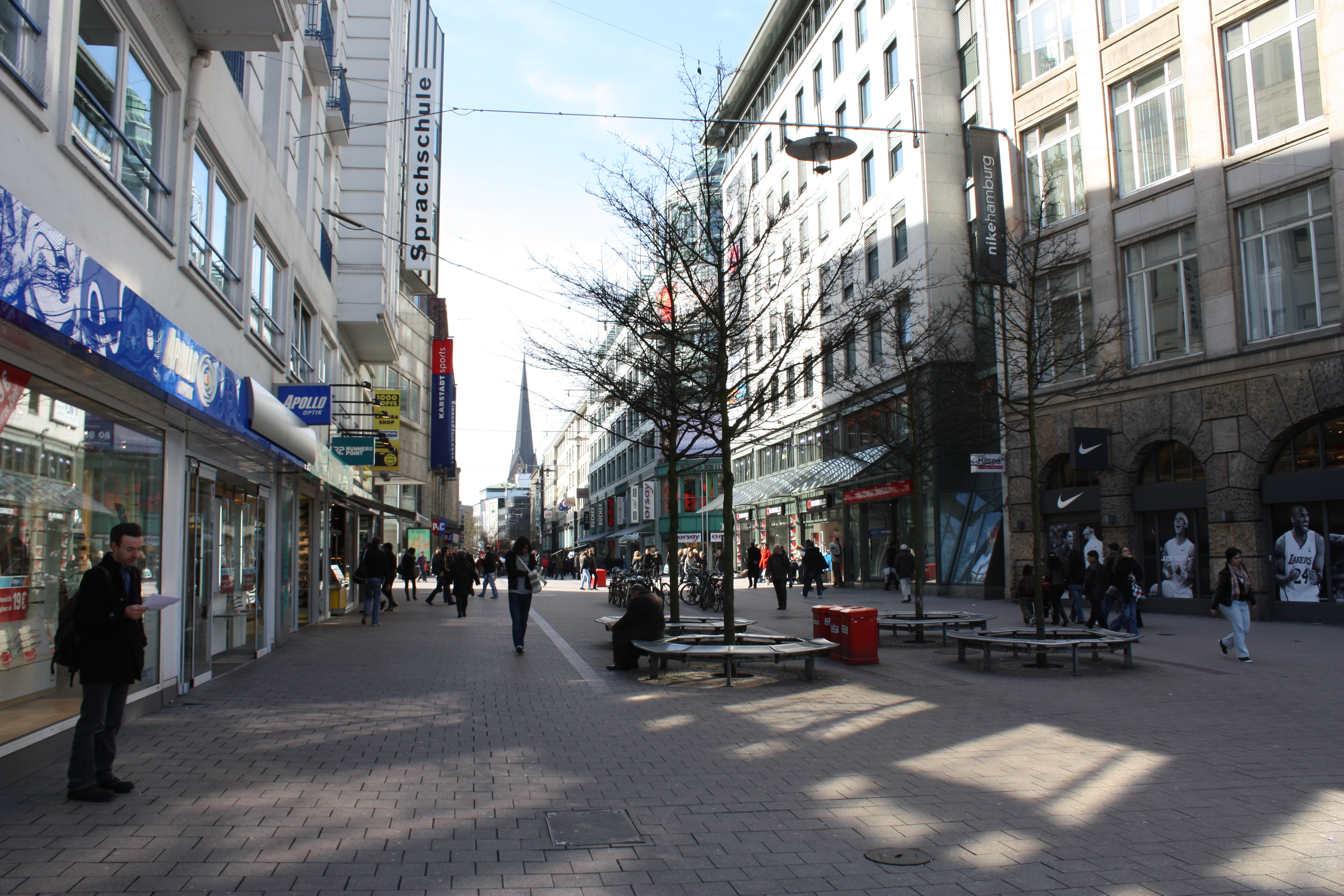
Spitalerstraße

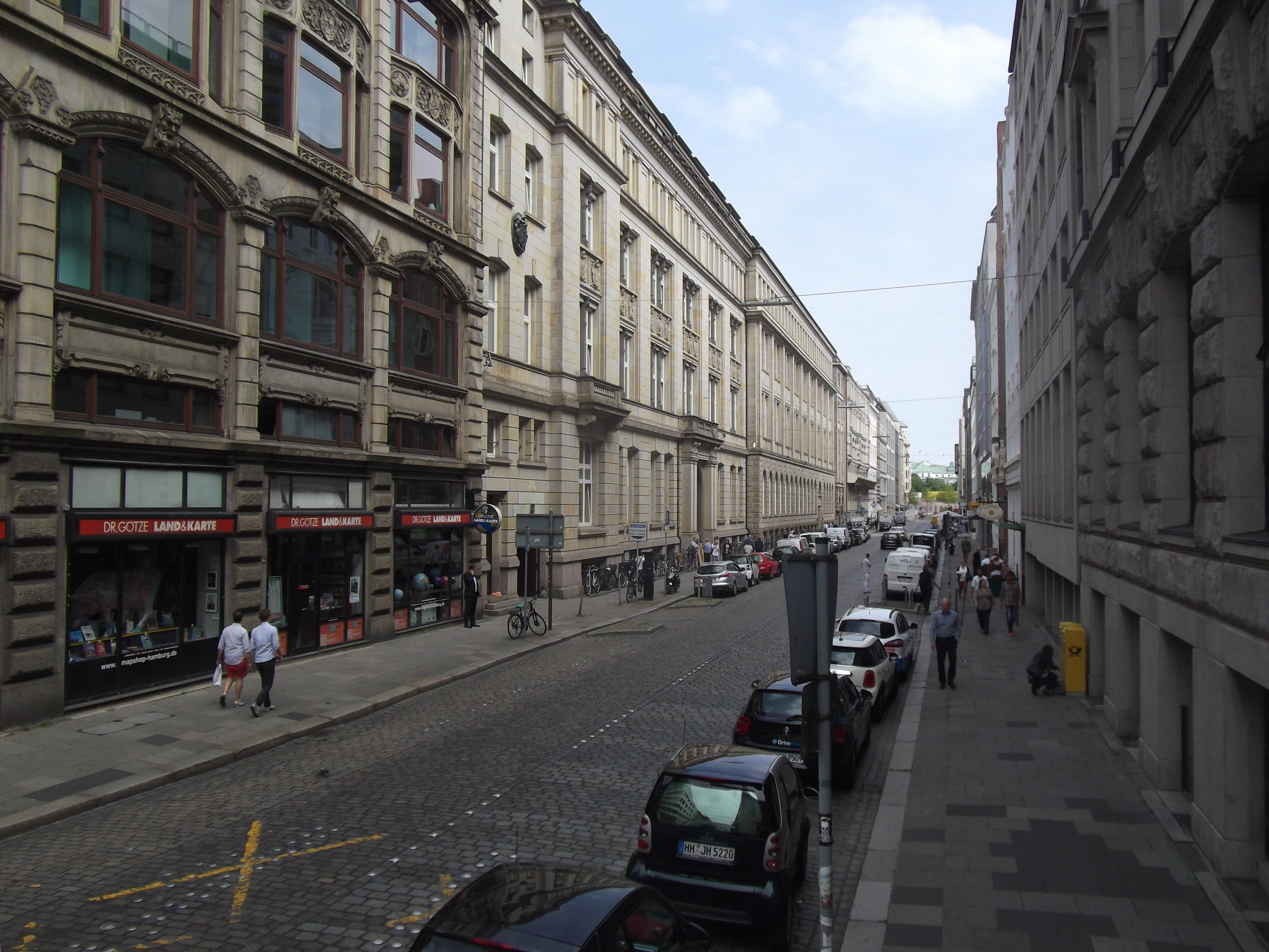
Ferdinandstraße

The eastern end of Altstadt is encircled by "Ring 1" (Glockengießerwall, Steintorwall), a 1880s-built ring road continuing into Neustadt. Willy-Brandt-Straße is part of Bundesstraße 4, a 1960s-built thoroughfare, crossing Altstadt midway from East to West.

== Politics ==
These are the results of Altstadt in the Hamburg state election:

Election	Greens	SPD	Left	CDU	FDP	AfD	Others
2020	30,5 %	29,1 %	9,9 %	9,6 %	7,9 %	4,9 %	8,2 %
2015	13,6 %	39,1 %	15,6 %	10,7 %	8,9 %	6,8 %	5,3 %
2011	15,2 %	49,2 %	8,0 %	17,0 %	4,1 %	–	6,3 %
2008	12,9 %	33,4 %	6,8 %	39,7 %	5,2 %	–	2,0 %
2004	17,3 %	31,4 %	–	39,1 %	3,2 %	–	9,0 %
2001	14,4 %	35,6 %	0,5 %	22,5 %	5,4 %	–	21,6 %
1997	20,2 %	36,6 %	0,5 %	22,7 %	3,5 %	–	16,5 %
1993	19,8 %	43,3 %	–	17,3 %	3,4 %	–	16,2 %

== Culture ==
=== Landmarks and cultural heritage ===
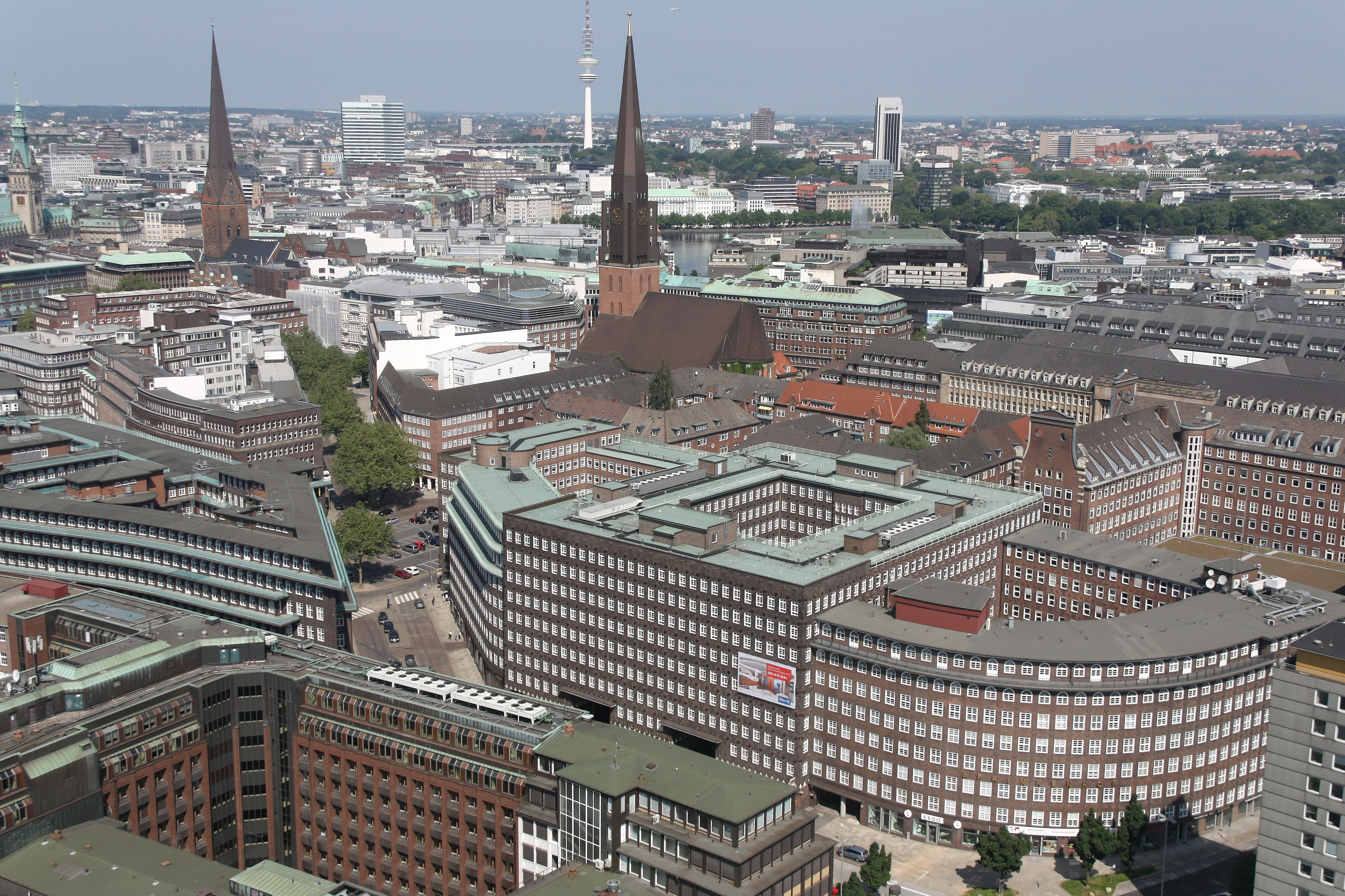
Aerial view of the Kontorhaus District

Major landmarks in Altstadt are three of Hamburg's five main-churches (Hauptkirchen): St. Jacobi, St. Katharinen and St. Petri; the former St. Nikolai today serves as a memorial against war.

The Hamburg Rathaus is an imposing Renaissance Revival structure, housing Hamburg's Senate and Parliament (Bürgerschaft). Forming a joint building ensemble back-to-back with the Hamburg Chamber of Commerce, it was built after the Great Fire of 1842.

Other landmarks include various buildings in the Kontorhaus District (most notably Chilehaus, Pressehaus and Sprinkenhof), and the Kunsthalle.

=== Museums and cultural institutions ===
- Museums
  - Hamburg Kunsthalle & Galerie der Gegenwart
  - Deichtorhallen & Haus der Photographie
  - Bucerius Kunst Forum
  - Chocoversum – Chocolate museum
- Music and performing arts venues
  - Thalia Theater
  - Das Schiff
  - Markthalle
