= Stephansplatz =

Stephansplatz may refer to either of the following:

- Stephansplatz, Vienna

- Stephansplatz station (Vienna U-Bahn)

- Stephansplatz, Hamburg

- Stephansplatz station (Hamburg U-Bahn)
