= Colonnaden =

Street in Hamburg

Coordinates: 53.5556°N 9.9906°E

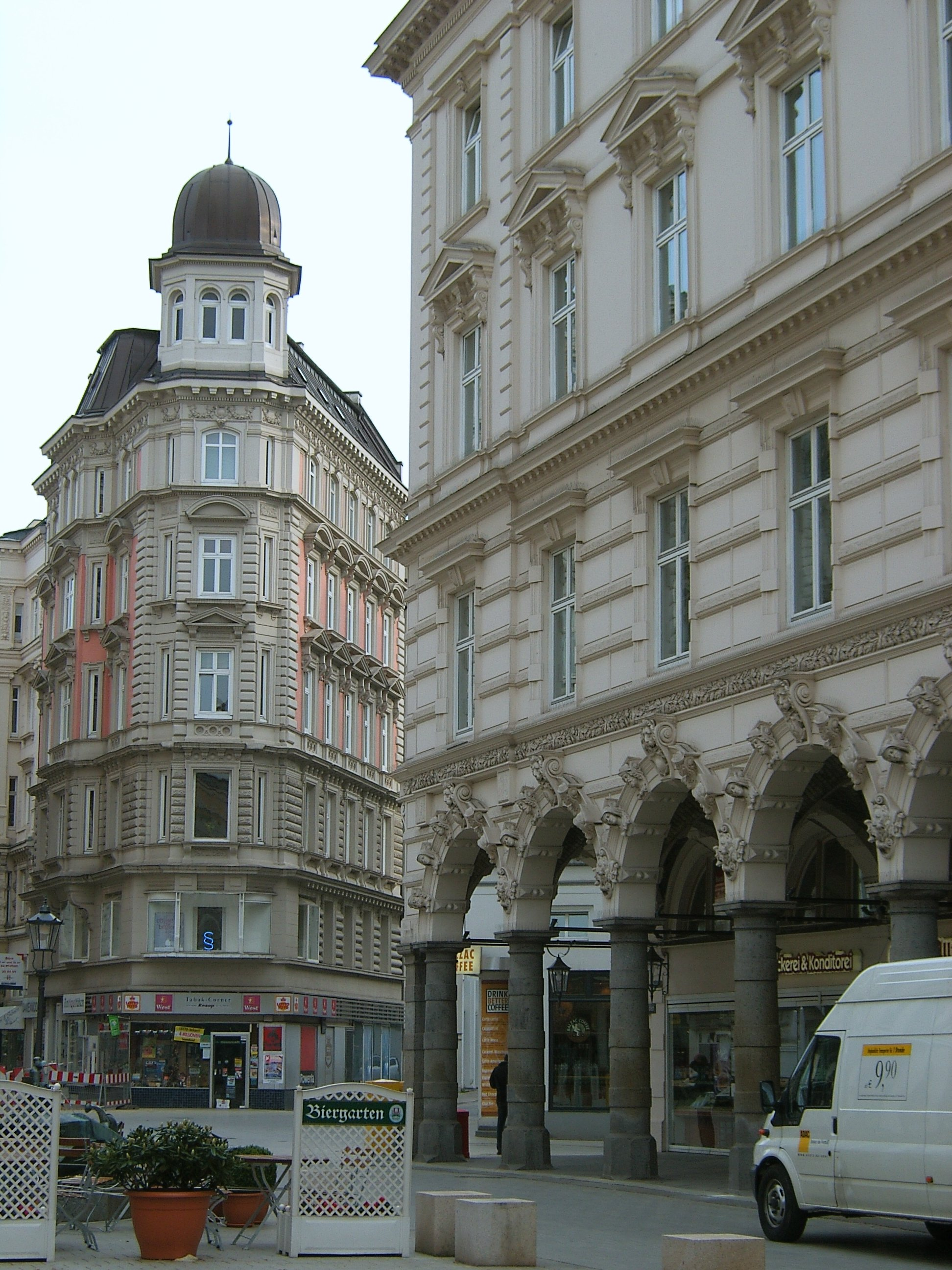
Colonnaden in 2006

The Colonnaden (the colonnades, pl. also in German lang.) is a shopping street in Neustadt quarter, Hamburg, Germany. The street, now largely a pedestrian zone, forms a diagonal junction from Jungfernstieg boulevard to Esplanade/Stephansplatz. It has a rich tradition and was dubbed a "Prachtmeile" (lit. splendour mile). Most of the buildings are designed in Renaissance Revival architecture and the north eastern side of the street is formed by arcades.

== History ==
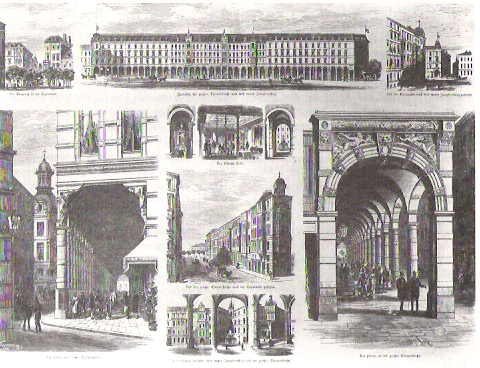
Colonnaden in 1880

In the 1870s, the street was a private road of the Wex brothers. Most buildings were erected around 1880. When the street was built, the last remnants of the Oper am Gänsemarkt were demolished. The KellJung line of Hamburg U-Bahn, later known as U1 line, was built until 1930 below the street, leading occasionally to a sales slowdown of the local shops.

In 1974, the street became a pedestrian zone. At the same time, a footbridge was built to the building of the former Hotel Esplanade, Dammtor area and Dammtor station, linking the street with the footbridge of the Dag Hammarskjöld bridge at the station. Many of the old apartment buildings are under monumental protection since 1978. The footbridge to the hotel building was demolished in 2005. In addition, the street was redesigned the same year. The southern part was partly re-opened for motorized traffic.
