= Museum für Kommunikation Hamburg =

Former museum in Germany

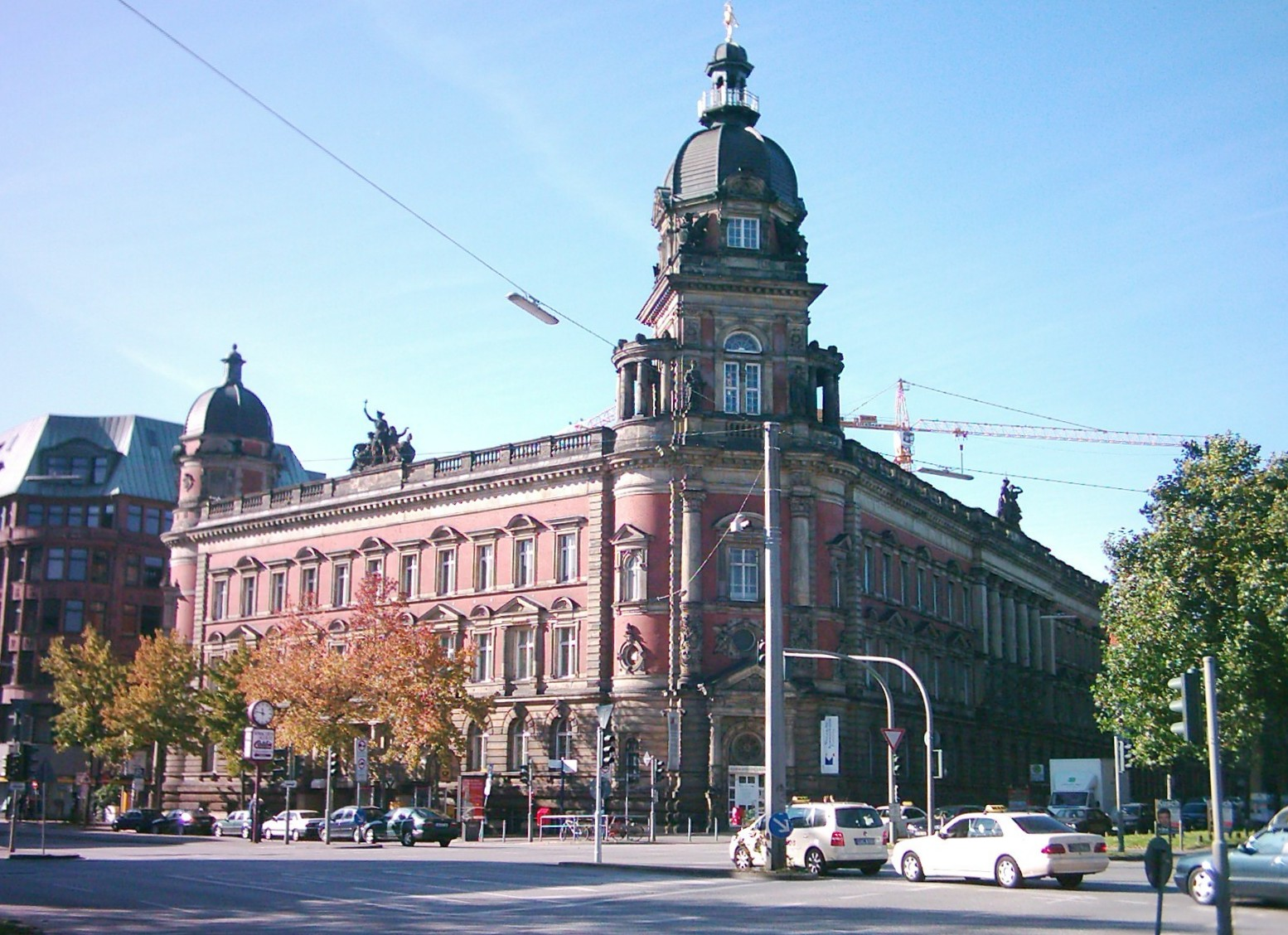

- Location of the museum in Hamburg Museum für Kommunikation Hamburg (Germany)
- Location: Hamburg, Germany
- Coordinates: 53.557778°N 9.988056°E
- Type: Telecommunication and postal service
- Public transit access: Dammtor
- Website: www.mfk-hamburg.de

The Museum für Kommunikation Hamburg (museum of communication) was a museum related to telecommunication and postal service in Hamburg, Germany. The museum in the building of Alte Oberpostdirektion at Stephansplatz square was owned by the Museumsstiftung Post und Telekommunikation (foundation for museums of postal service and telecommunication). It was closed to visitors on 19 October 2009 and was liquidated afterwards.

The collection placed emphasis on the difficulties of communication at sea, the museum participated in the Long Night of Museums.

== See also ==
- List of museums and cultural institutions in Hamburg
