= Carl Ludwig Wimmel =

German architect

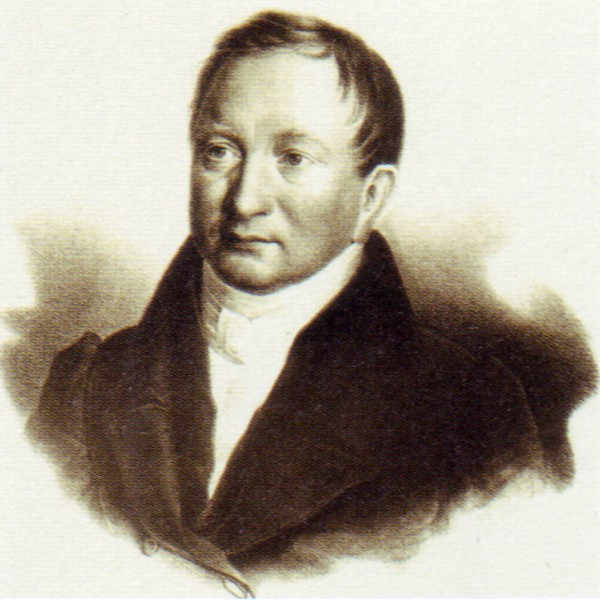
Carl Ludwig Wimmel (1830)

Carl Ludwig Wimmel (23 January 1786 – 16 February 1845) was a German architect and Hamburg's first building director. His classicist buildings had a decisive influence on the cityscape of Hamburg in the 19th century; his best-known surviving buildings include the Hamburg Stock Exchange and the hospital in St. Georg.

== Biography ==
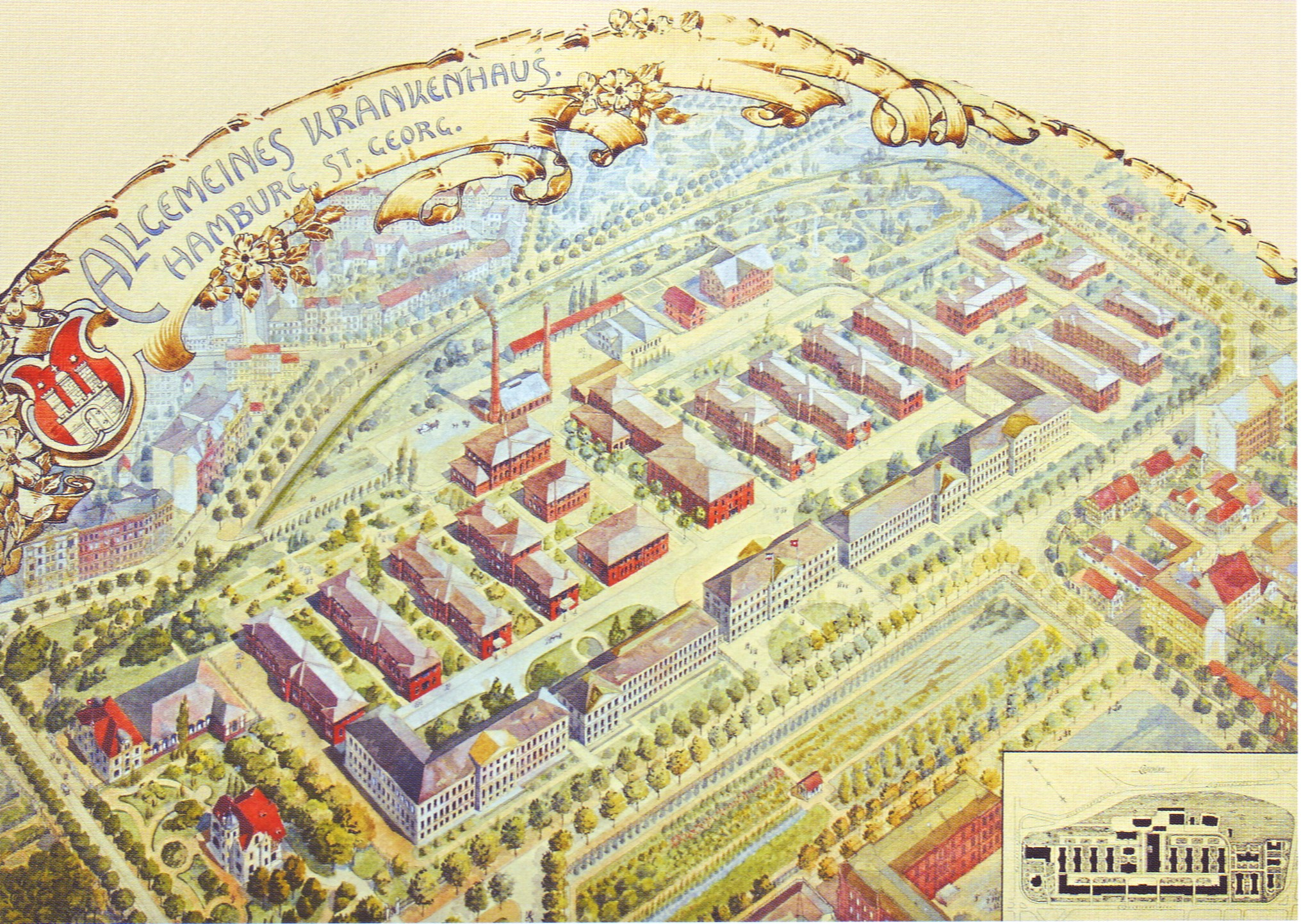
St. Georg Hospital (around 1900). In the foreground the bright buildings by Wimmel can be seen. The rear buildings are by Carl Johann Christian Zimmermann.

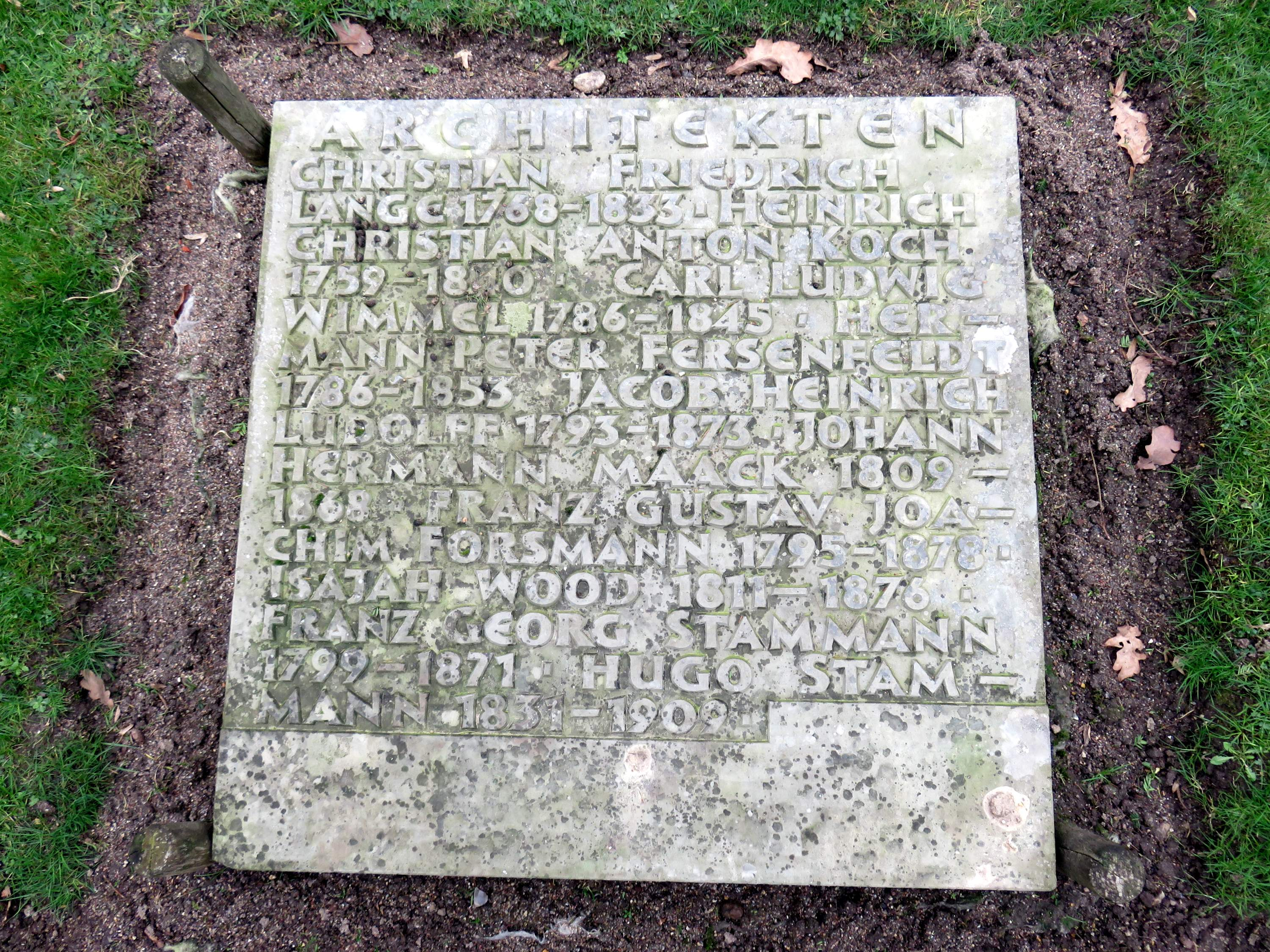
Collective tombstone "architects" on the Ohlsdorf Cemetery

Wimmel was born the son of a stonemason. Early on he came into contact with architects and sculptors such as Karl Friedrich Schinkel, Christian Daniel Rauch and Johann Gottfried Schadow. Wimmel initially trained as a carpenter. From 1807 he took part in free courses of the Patriotic Society to further his education. He received a scholarship which enabled him to study at the École polytechnique in Paris. After completing his studies in 1810, he travelled through Italy for four years. There he studied the architecture of antiquity and the Renaissance and made numerous sketches and studies.

In 1815 he won the tender for the construction of a hospital in the district of St. Georg, Hamburg. In 1816 he joined the civil service and realised numerous public buildings, which still characterise the cityscape today. After he was financially secured by the public office, he soon acquired Hamburg citizenship. He married Johanna Juliana Sophie Frercks, the daughter of a Hamburg notary. The couple had seven children. After a reform of the municipal building administration, he was appointed Hamburg's first building director. Wimmel died in 1845. Many of his buildings fell victim to the Great Fire of 1842, were demolished, or destroyed in the Second World War.

A collective tombstone in the area of the Old Hamburg Memorial Cemetery on the Ohlsdorf Cemetery commemorates important architects, including Wimmel.

== Notable works ==
- 1815: Monument of the expelled Hamburgers
- 1817: Dammtor
- 1818: Steintor and Alte Wache in St. Georg
- 1819: Guardhouse at Millerntor
- 1819–1820: St. Pauli Church
- 1820–1823: General hospital St. Georg
- 1826–1827: City theatre on Dammtorstraße (today Hamburg State Opera)
- 1827: Lombard Bridge
- 1834–1837: St. Johannis Monastery
- 1837–1840: Johanneum at the Domplatz
- 1837–1841: Hamburg Stock Exchange (with Franz Gustav Forsmann)
- 1840–1841: Schlachthof Hamburg

== Gallery ==
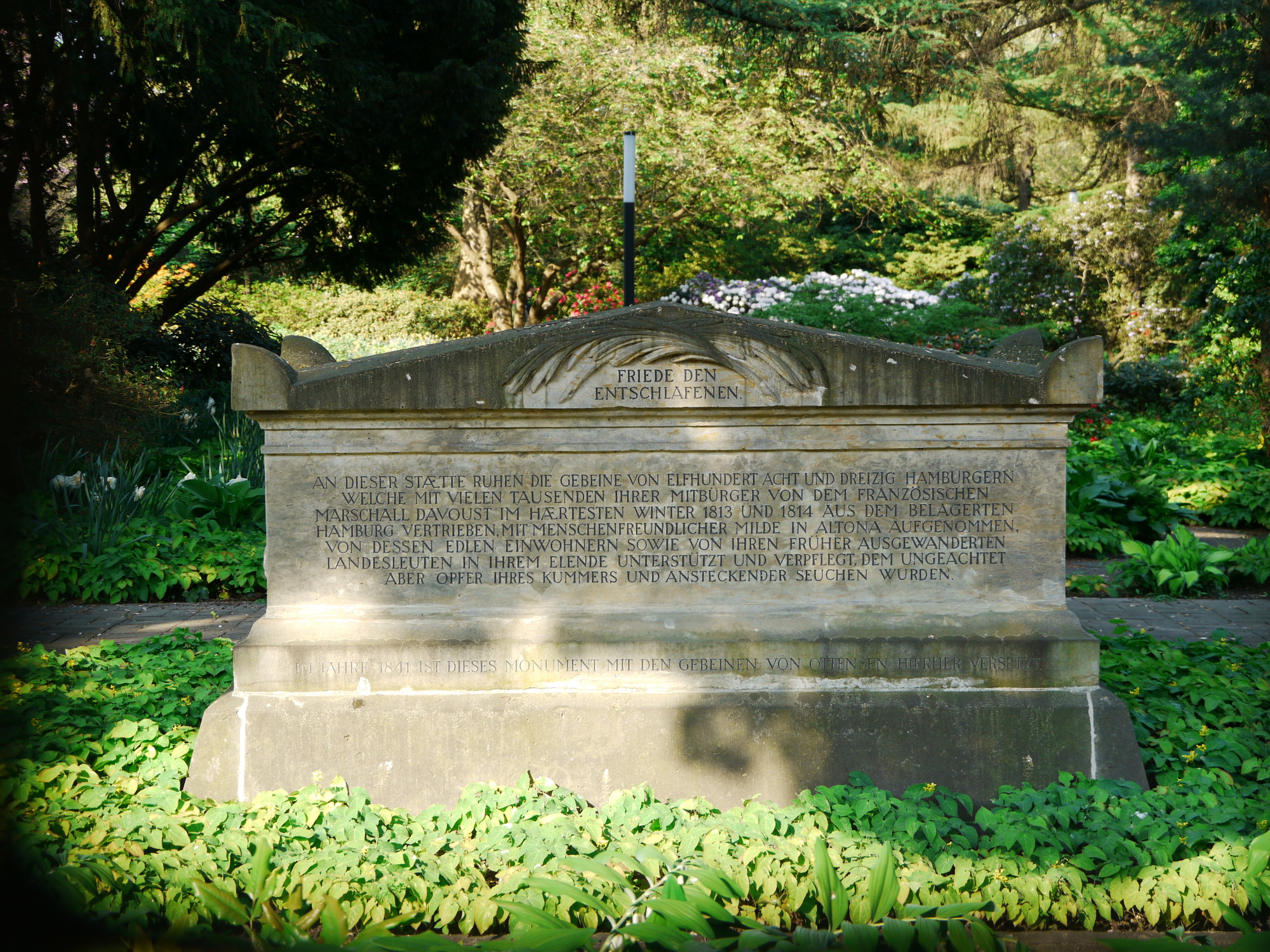
Monument in the park Planten un Blomen

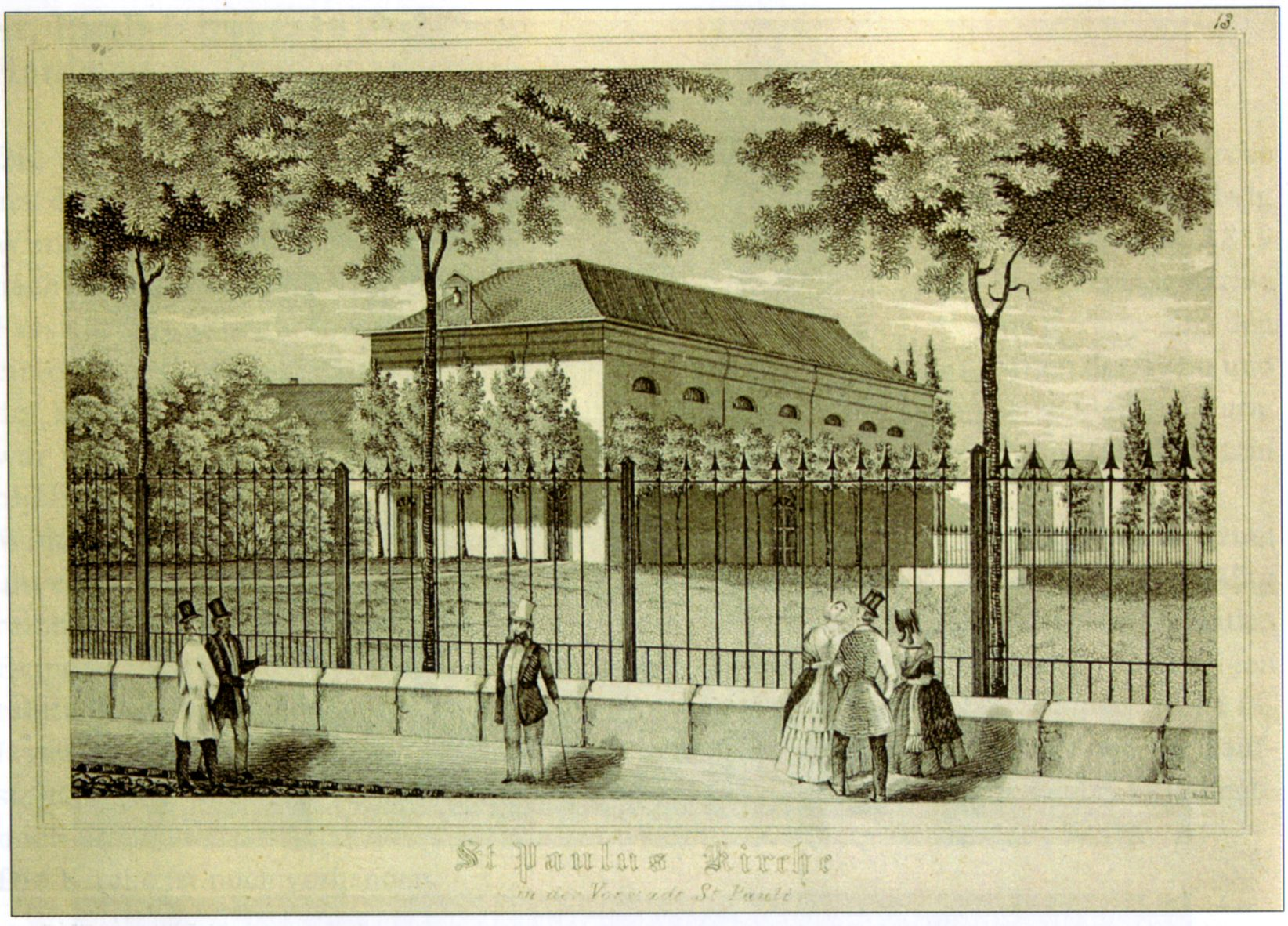
St. Pauli Church

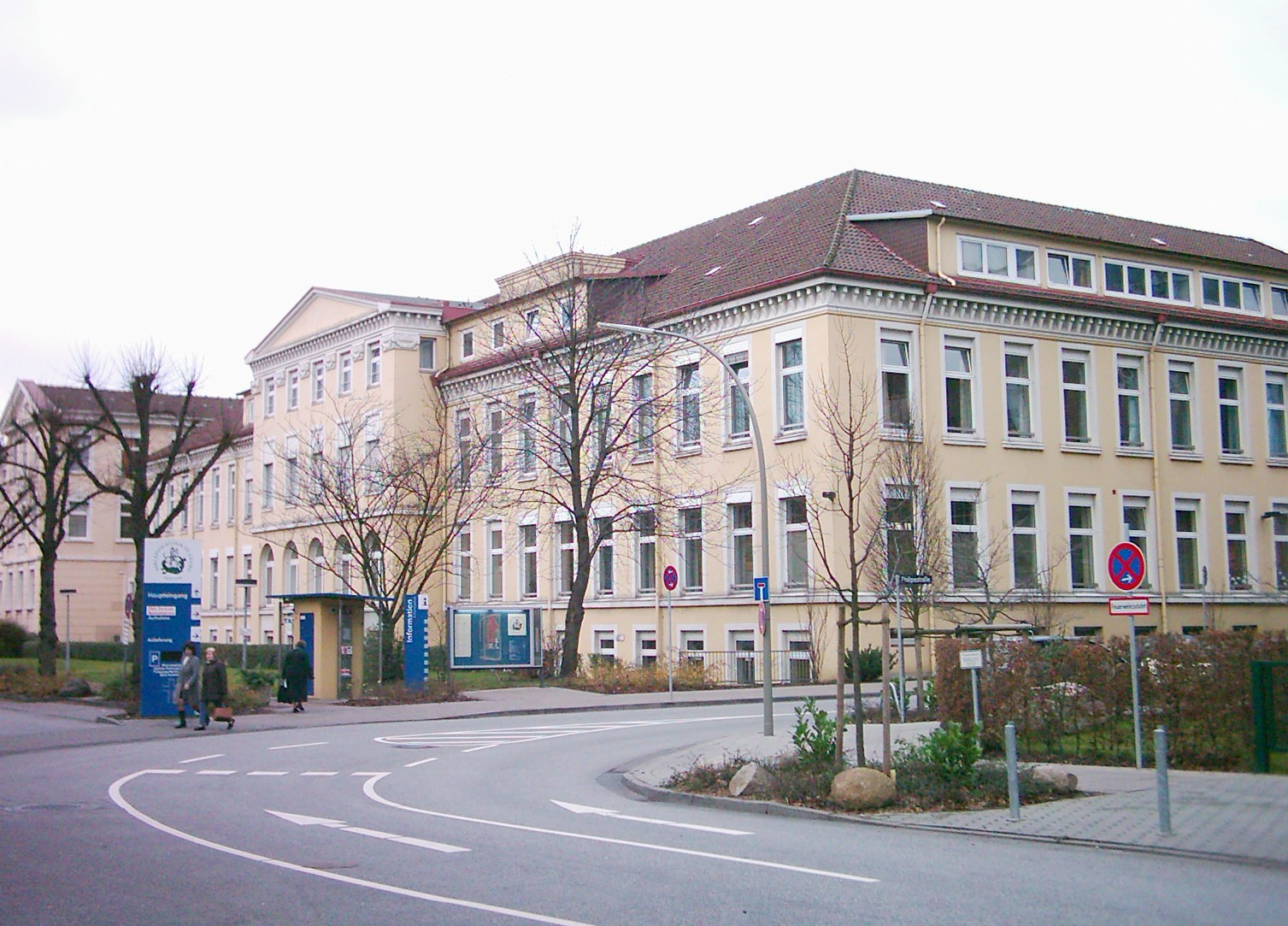
Hospital in St. Georg

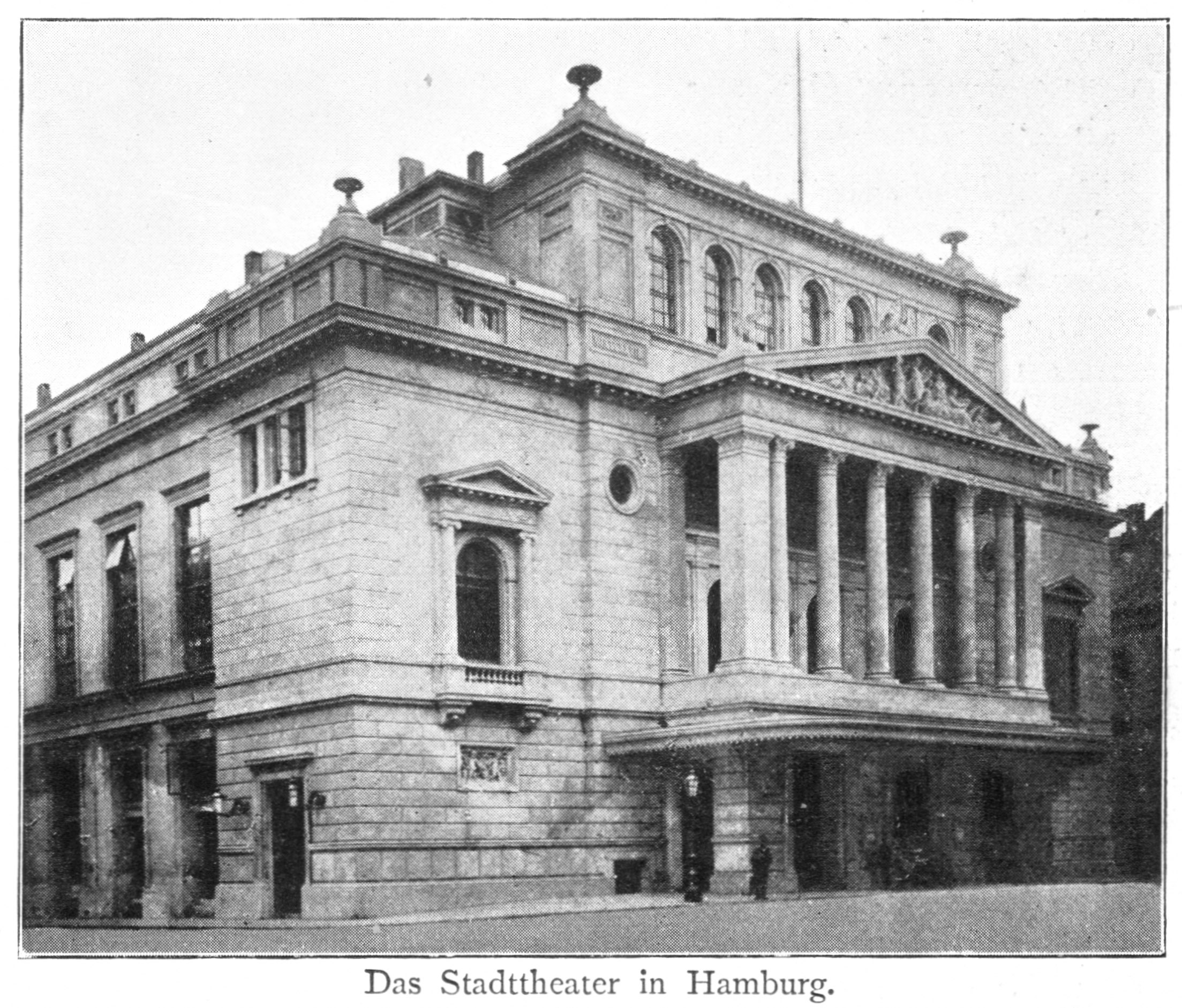
City theatre

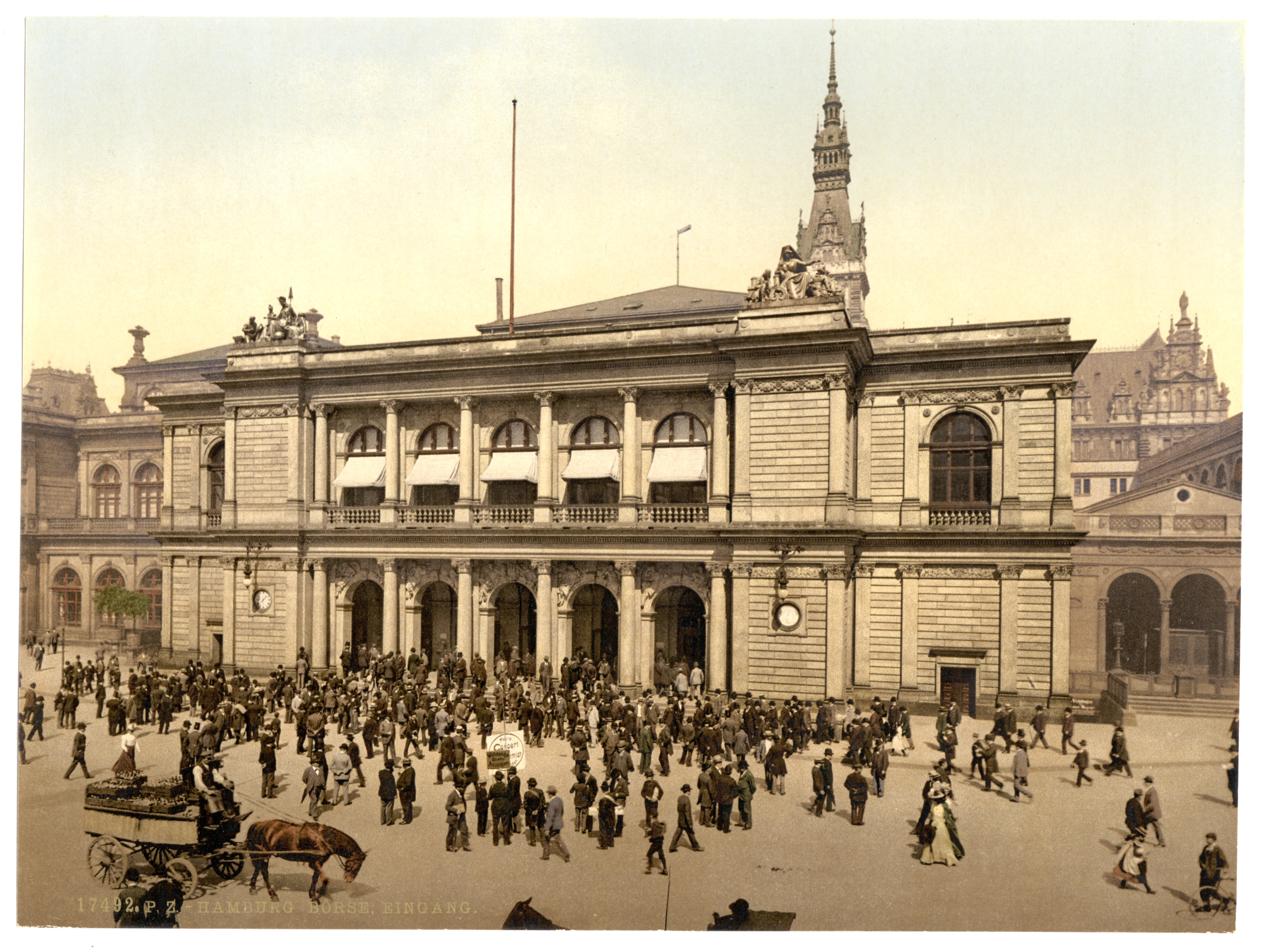
Hamburg Stock Exchange

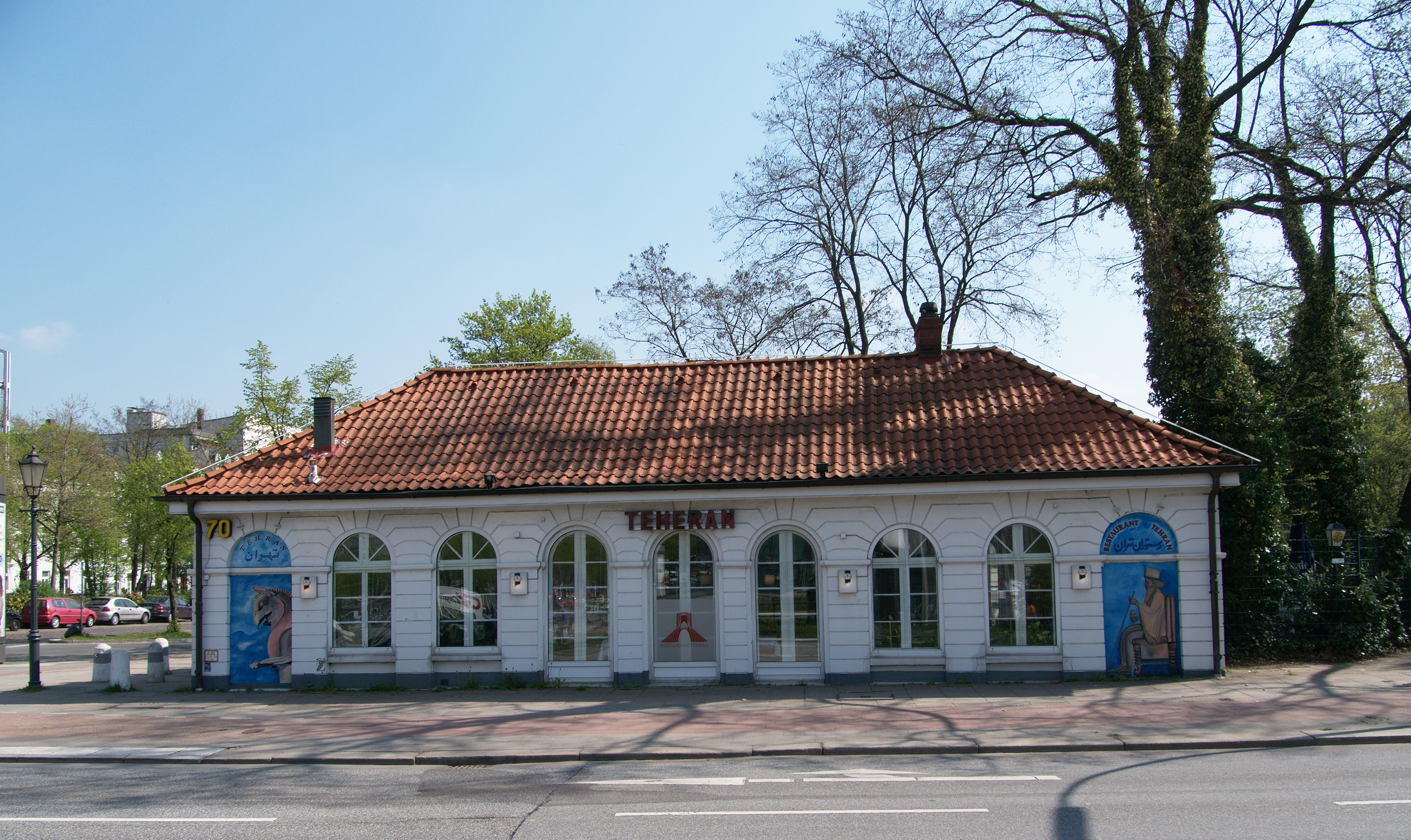
Alte Wache near Steintor
