= Stephansplatz station (Hamburg U-Bahn) =

Railway station in Hamburg, Germany

Stephansplatz
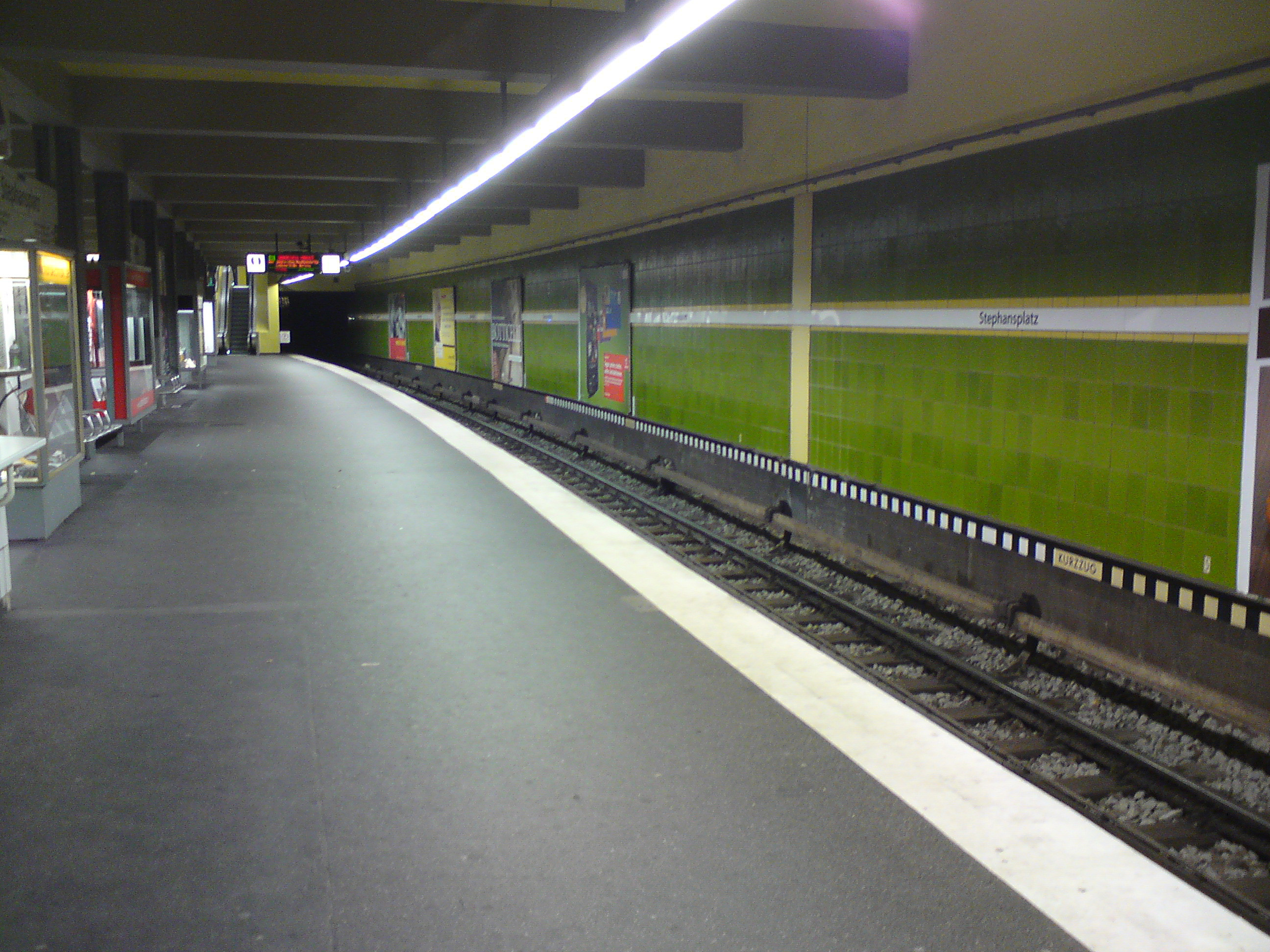

General information
- Location: Hamburg; Germany
- Coordinates: 53.5586°N 9.9892°E
- System: Hamburg U-Bahn station
- Operator: Hamburger Hochbahn AG
- Line: U1
- Platforms: 1 island platform
- Tracks: 2

Construction
- Structure type: Underground
- Accessible: Yes

Other information
- Station code: HHA: SN
- Fare zone: HVV: A/000

History
- Opened: 2 June 1929; 97 years ago
- Electrified: at opening

Services
Preceding station	Hamburg U-Bahn	Following station
Hallerstraße towards Norderstedt Mitte	U1	Jungfernstieg towards Großhansdorf or Ohlstedt
Location
- Location within Hamburg Location within Schleswig-Holstein Location within Germany Location within Europe

Stephansplatz station is a metro station served by Hamburg U-Bahn line U1. It is located at Stephansplatz in the Neustadt (New Town) quarter of Hamburg.

== History ==
The station was opened on 2 June 1929 and refurbished in 1972.

The platform was fully renovated from 2015 to 2016. It was partly heightened to facilitate easier access of disabled persons to the trains. A lift was added and opened on 30 May 2016.

== Location ==
Stephansplatz is an important junction on the Hamburg Wallring. Within walking distance lie Hamburg Dammtor station, the Messe ground and Congress Center Hamburg.

== See also ==
- List of Hamburg U-Bahn stations
