= Hamburg Wallring =

Ring road in Hamburg, Germany

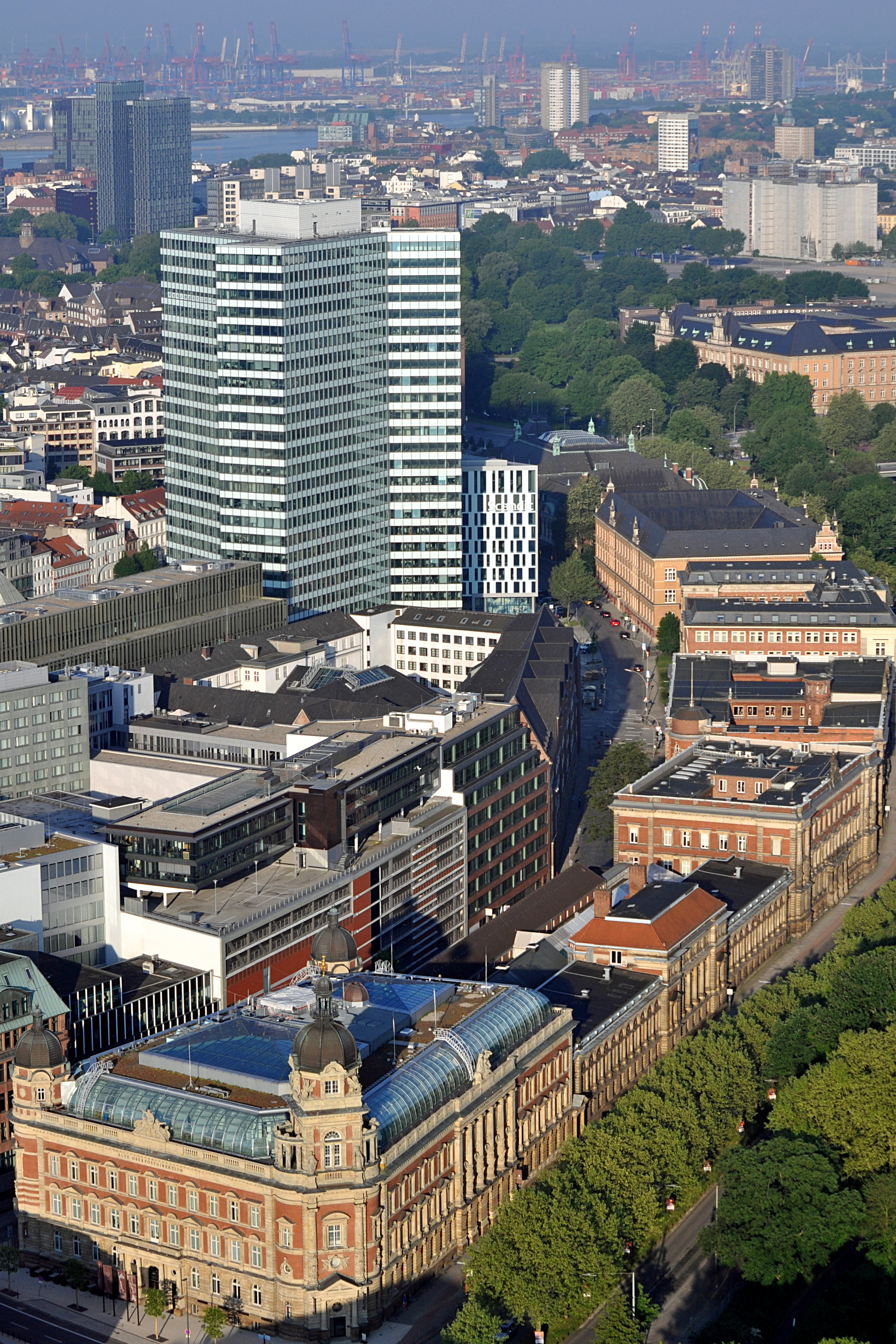
View of Neustadt's western Wallring. In the background: Elbe and port.

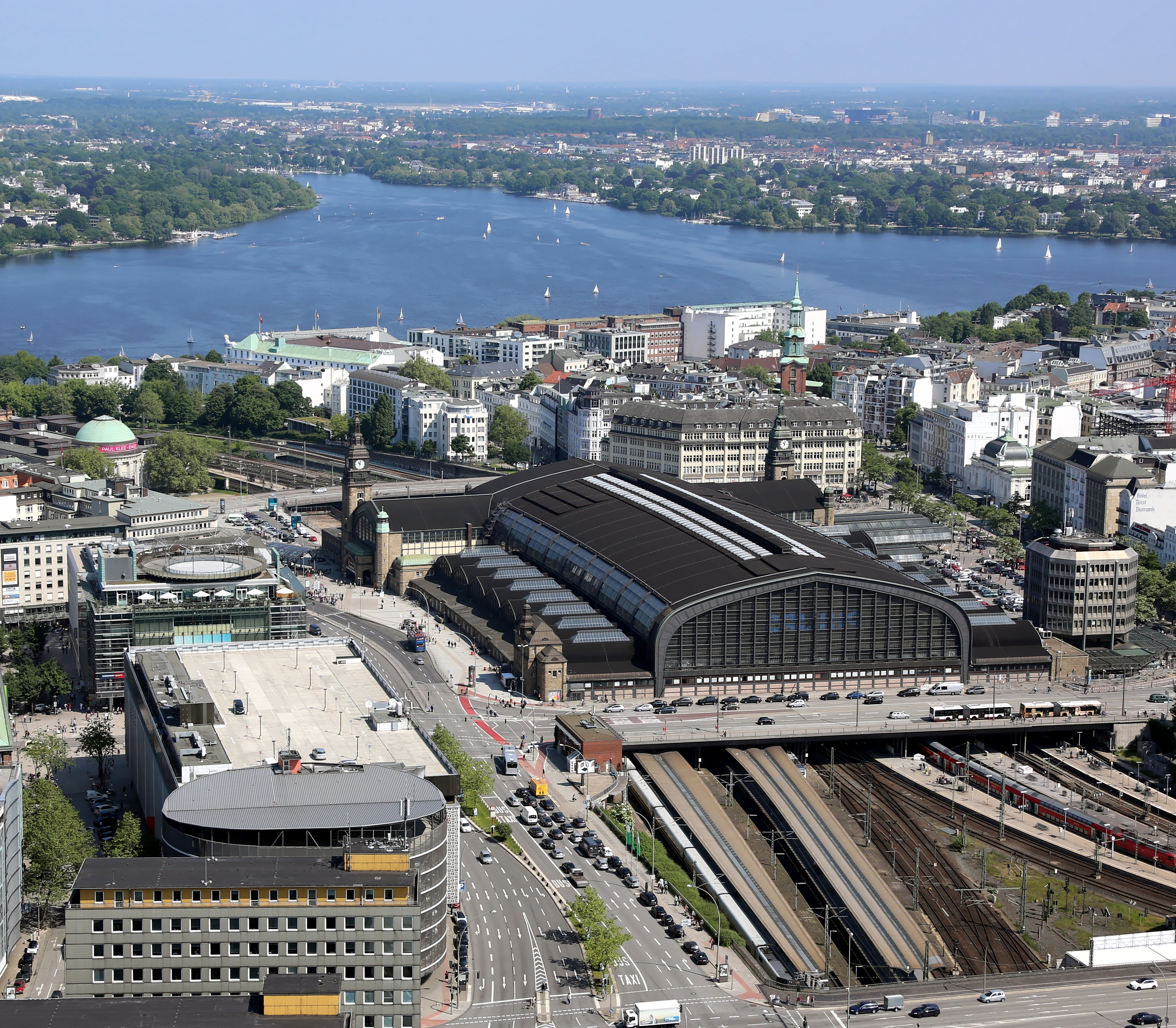
View of Altstadt's eastern Wallring. In the background: the Außenalster.

The Wallring (German pronunciation: [ˈvalrɪŋ]) is a semi-circular urban ensemble encircling the inner city of Hamburg. It consists of a four-lane ring road with a total length of 3.3 kilometers (2.1 mi) and a continuous built-up street front on its inner side. The outer perimeter is – for the largest part – made up by a string of parks.

The Wallring follows the outline of Hamburg's old city wall, and was developed in the first half of the 19th century, when the defensive wall, the Wallanlagen, was razed. The wall that defined the city's edge from the 1620s until the 1840s has had a strong impact on shaping the modern city. The Wallring park consists of several differently named sections, which — based on their common historical development — are characterized by a certain unity, but also by a number of dissimilarities. It also offers the inner city's largest network of parks, and forms a sort of connection to Hamburg's green and open spaces along the Elbe and Alster rivers.

== Terminology ==
Etymologically, "Wallring" is derived from the German word "Wall" for Hamburg's former fortifications. (Note: Compare theory for the Dutch origin of Wall Street.) Semantically, the Wallring was originally associated with the parks, and with the parks' semi-circular unity in jeopardy, the meaning shifted to the nonetheless continuous ring road. The parks alone are otherwise also referred to as Wallanlagen or Grüner Ring. The ring road, a succession of roads, is also referred to as Inner Ring or just Ring. The department of transportation's official designation is Ring 1 (German: Ring Eins) in reference to subsequent ring roads Ring 2 and Ring 3 further out.

For its heterogeneous quality, the Wallring is being differentiated as Westlicher (Western) and Östlicher (Eastern) Wallring. While the western Wallring has a continuous park front, the eastern Wallring is marked by traffic infrastructure. Regardless of the terminology for the ring road as a whole, its individual sections have proper street names.

== History ==
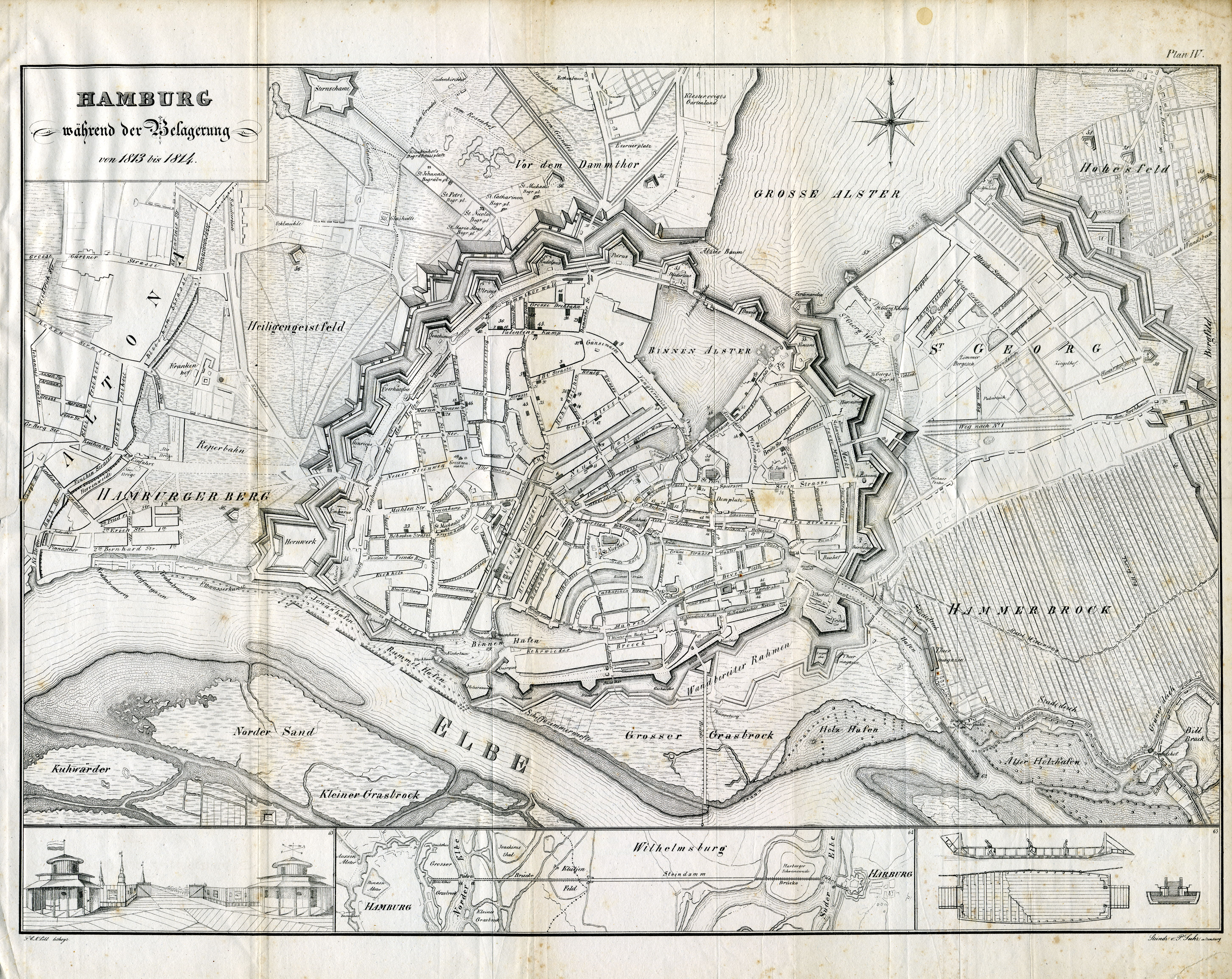
Map of Hamburg and its defenses in 1813

The Wallring follows the course of Hamburg's former Wallanlagen (ramparts) developed by Dutch military engineer Johan van Valckenburgh between 1616 and 1625.

=== Former city gates ===
Former city gates were Millerntor and Dammtor on the western and north-western side, Steintor on the eastern side, and Sandtor and Brooktor near the Elbe. Later additional gates were created, including Hafentor, Holstentor, Klostertor and Deichtor. The locations of all gates are still known as minor localities or zones of Hamburg.

=== Conversion into a public park ===
By the early 19th century, the ramparts were outdated and rendered useless against foreign attacks. In 1806, Napoleon had no resistance when capturing Hamburg. The fortifications were ultimately removed between 1820 and 1837, the outer glacis were subsequently remodeled into a park by German landscape architect Isaak Altmann (1777–1837). During the 1860s, the Wallring was developed as a boulevard, with a number of representative buildings lining the inner side – among those new structures for the Kunsthalle (1869), the Oberpostdirektion (1887) and the Natural History Museum (1891) – the outer side remained unbuilt apart from a few structures placed within the park-like settings. Already in the 1840s, the circular park suffered setbacks by infringements caused by the Hamburg-Altona rail. Eventually Hamburg Hauptbahnhof was built from 1898 until 1906. In 1922 the Hamburg Museum opened in premises at Holstenwall.

During the bombing in World War II, the Natural History Museum was destroyed in 1943. Following the war, many of the former defensive ditches were filled with rubble. During the late 1950s and early 1960s, the Esplanade lost most of its northern building ensemble. Today, the western parks resembles the design of the International Garden Exhibitions (IGA) of 1963 and 1973. parts of the eastern Wallring are tunneled by the so-called Wallring Tunnel, built between 1963 and 1966.

== Description of the ring segments ==
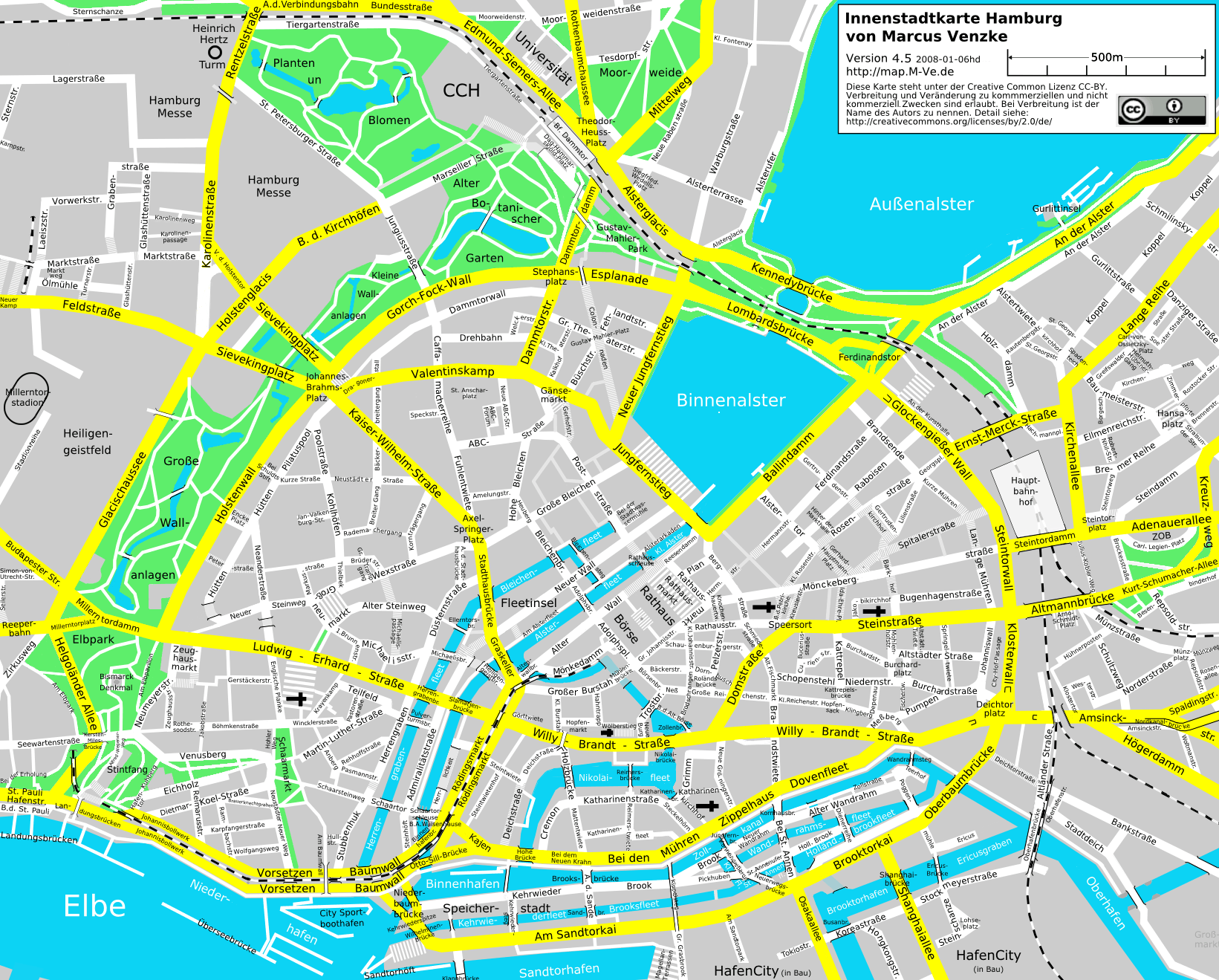
Map of Hamburg's inner city districts Altstadt and Neustadt. The western Wallring starts at the Elbe near Stintfang and runs along the inside of the Wallanlagen parks. At Lombard Bridge, the ring road crosses the Alster River. The eastern Wallring continues on the inside of the railway tracks, before terminating at the Elbe's shore at Oberhafen.

The Wallring consists of the western and eastern Wallring, separated from each other by Lombard Bridge. The park continues along the bridge's feeders, while the bridge also marks the border between Neustadt and Altstadt.

=== Western Wallring ===
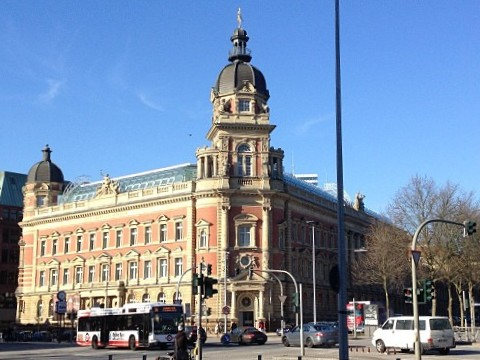
The old Oberpostdirektion at Gorch-Fock-Wall

Geographically, the Wallring starts at Stintfang on the Elbe shore. Traffic-wise, the Wallring starts at Millerntordamm, off Millerntorplatz.

Holstenwall

Holstenwall, the Wallring's first section, runs up to Johannes-Brahms-Platz, named after Hamburg-born composer Johannes Brahms, and location of the Laeiszhalle. Holstenwall is flanked by Große Wallanlagen.

Gorch-Fock-Wall

After passing Johannes-Brahms-Platz, the ring continues as Gorch-Fock-Wall, named after Hamburg-born poet Gorch Fock. It runs up to Stephansplatz, an important junction with Dammtorstraße. It is flanked by the Kleine Wallanlagen and the Old Botanical Garden (Alter Botanischer Garten).

=== Esplanade ===
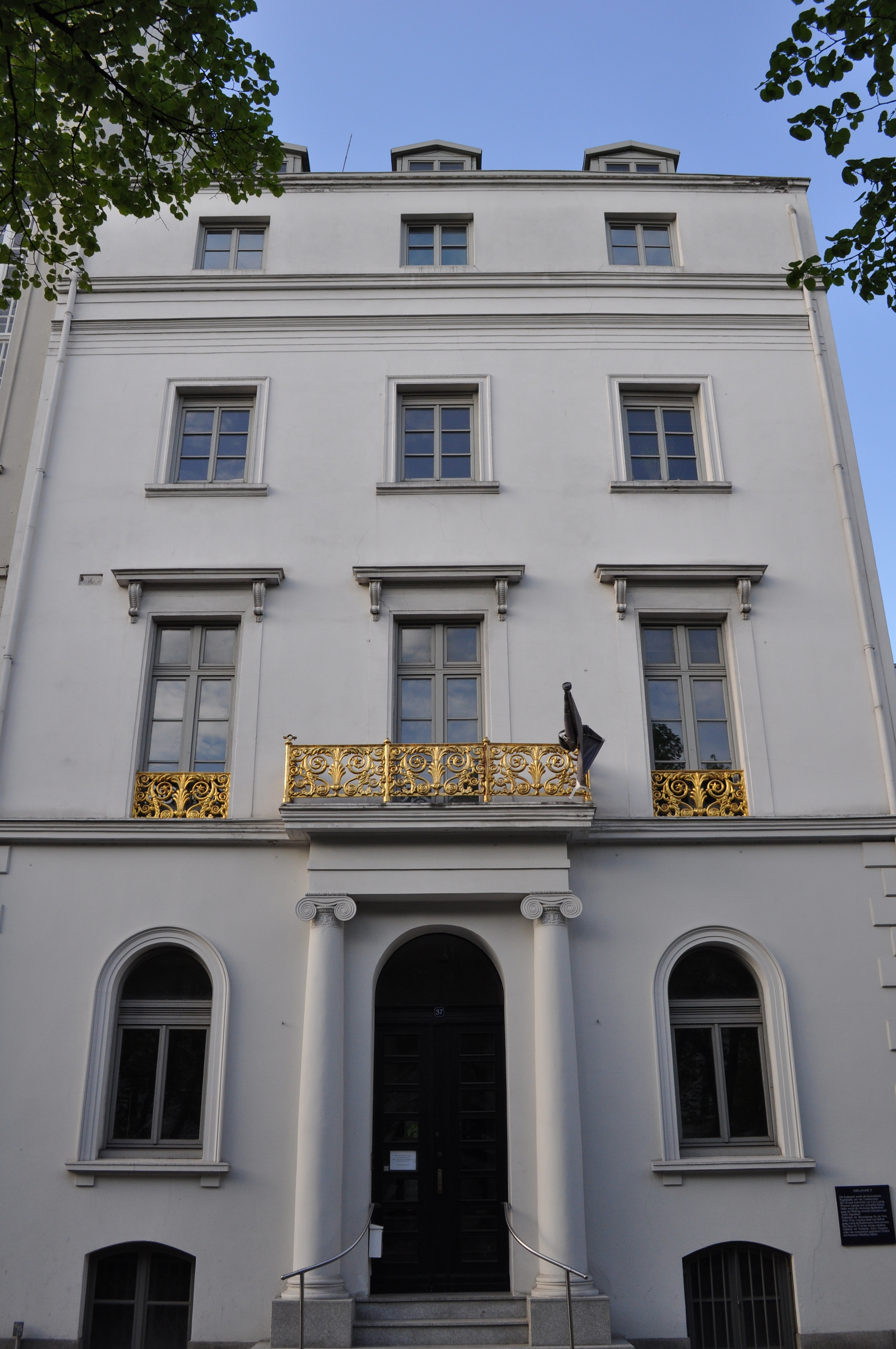
One of the Neoclassical terraces at Esplanade

The Esplanade (German pronunciation: [ˌɛsplaˈnaːdə]) is only 0.25 kilometers (0.16 mi) long, yet at 50 meters (160 ft) rather wide. It runs from Stephansplatz to the north-western corner of Binnenalster and was developed between 1827 and 1830 according to plans by Carl Ludwig Wimmel (1786–1845). The neoclassical facades were inspired by London's Portland Place, the avenue's four lines of linden trees were modeled after Berlin's Unter den Linden. The shopping street of Colonnaden, leading to Jungfernstieg boulevard, ends here.

=== Lombardsbrücke ===
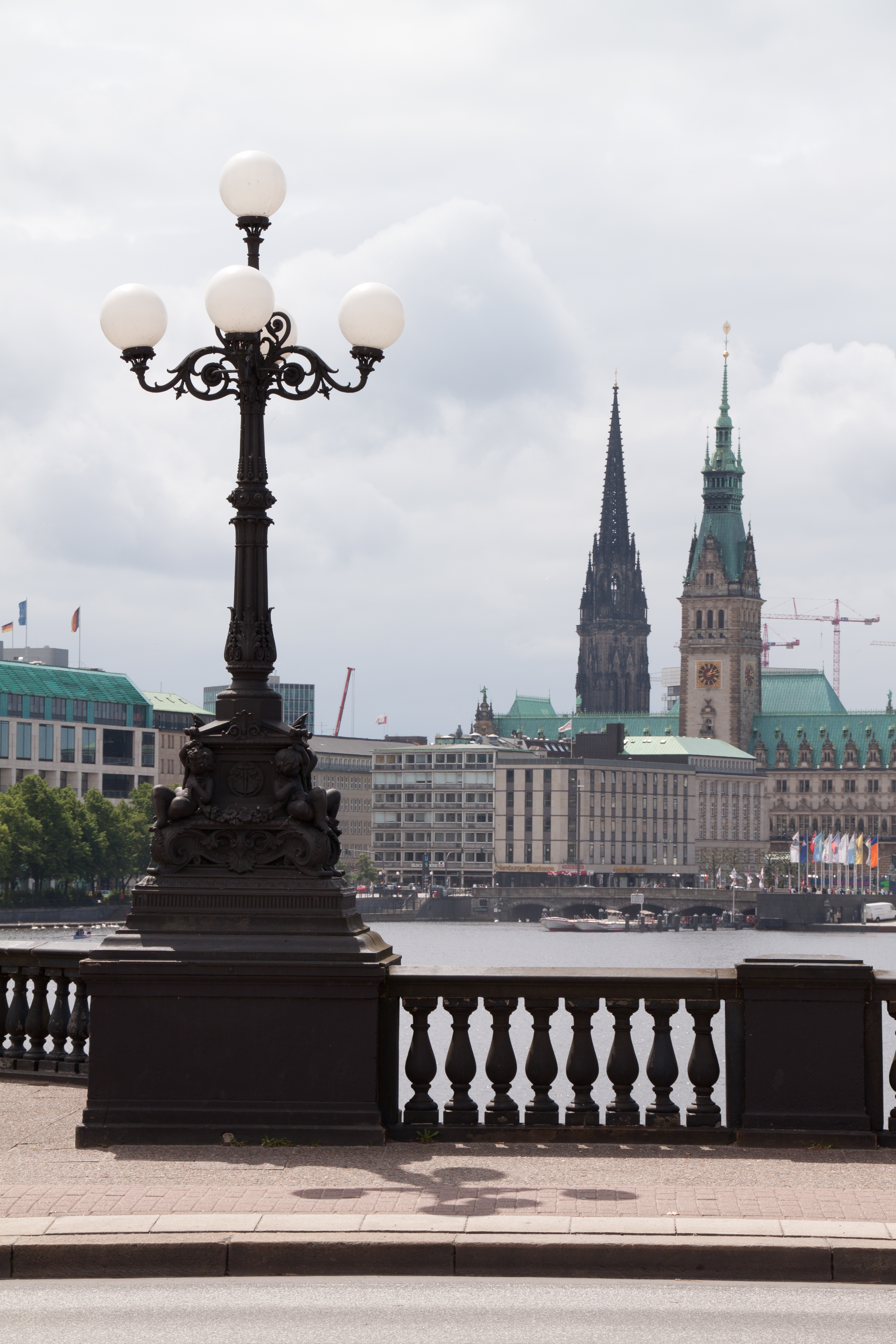
View of the Binnenalster from Lombardsbrücke

Lombardsbrücke (Lombard Bridge) is the name of the bridge crossing the Alster River at the location of the former Alster glacis, and also the name of the two feeders, built on the former glacis. The feeders are landscaped parks, transitioning between the two Alster lakes. The current Renaissance Revival bridge was designed by Johann Hermann Maack (1809–1868) as a three-bay stone arch bridge and completed between 1864 and 1868. A first bridge at this location dated from the mid 17th century. On the bridge, the view opens up wide onto the Binnenalster, historically the Hanseatic city's "state parlour".

=== Eastern Wallring ===
The eastern Wallring is part of Hamburg's "Museum Mile" (Museumsmeile), being home to some of the city's largest art museums. Despite this concentration of art, its outer perimeter is lacking the ring road's overriding underlying concept of a unified spatial perception and subject to redevelopment. Since the 1960s, most of the traffic on the eastern Wallring is diverted through the Wallringtunnel.

Glockengießerwall

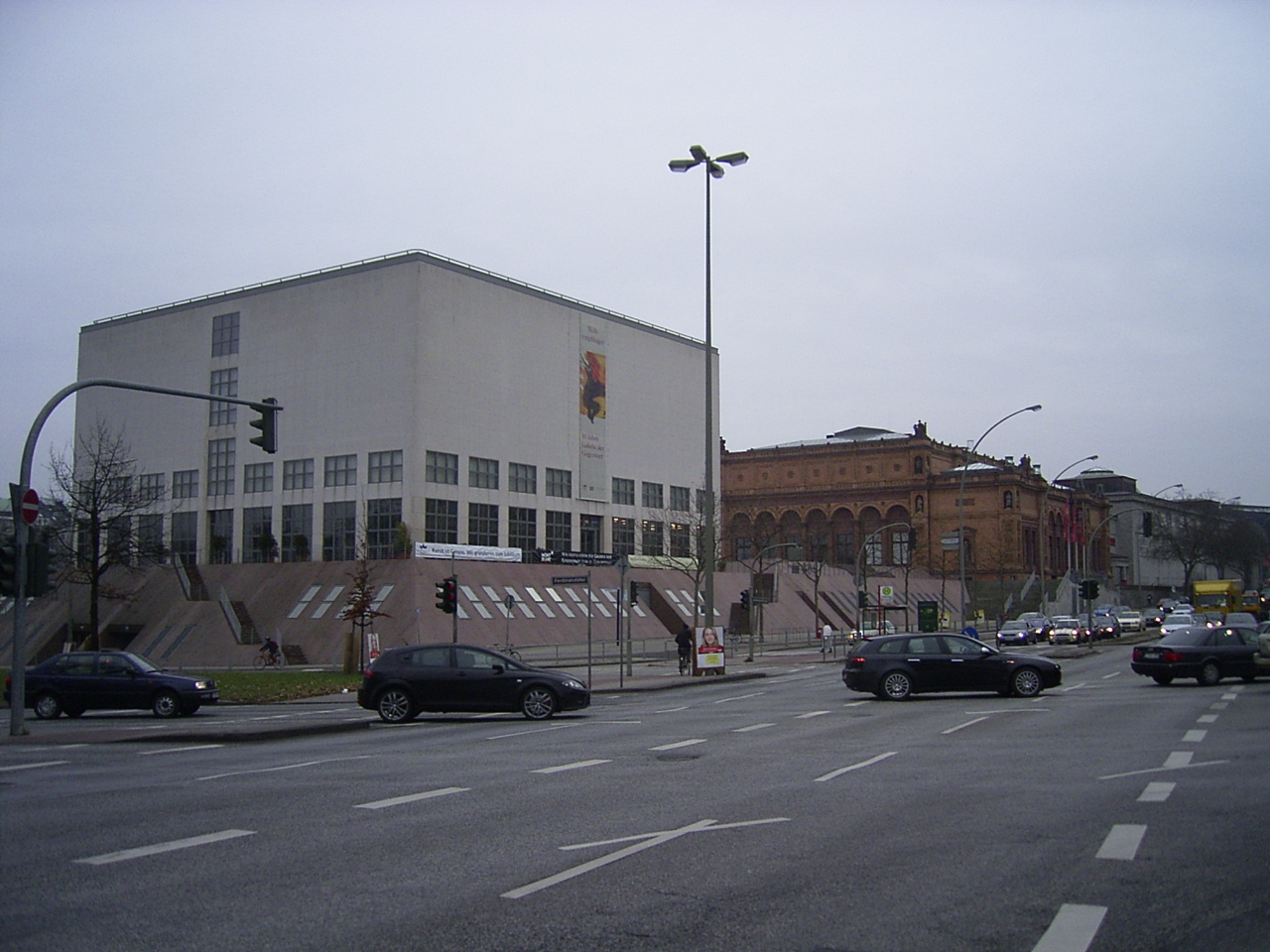
The Galerie der Gegenwart at Glockengießerwall

The outer perimeter of Glockengießerwall is home of the Renaissance Revival Kunsthalle, completed in 1869, and the Postmodern Galerie der Gegenwart, completed in 1997.

Steintorwall

At Steintorwall, the Walling passes Hamburg Hauptbahnhof on the outer perimeter and shopping streets Spitalerstraße and Mönckebergstraße on the inner perimeter.

Klosterwall

Klosterwall is the Wallring's last section before terminating at Zollkanal. Klosterwall passes Georgsplatz and Deichtorplatz.

== Landmarks ==
Both eastern and western Wallring are lined with landmarks, museums and cultural institutions.

=== Parks and open spaces ===
- Alter Elbpark with Bismarck Monument
- Große Wallanlagen
- Sievekingplatz with Hanseatic Higher Regional Court (HansOLG)
- Kleine Wallanlagen
- Alter Botanischer Garten
- Georg-Mahler Park with Casino Esplanade
- Binnenalster
- Hauptbahnhof

=== Museums and cultural institutions ===
Museums

- Hamburg Museum
- Kunsthalle & Galerie der Gegenwart
- Museum für Kunst und Gewerbe
- Hamburg Kunstverein
- Freie Akademie der Künste
- Deichtorhallen

Theaters and stages

- Laeiszhalle
- Markthalle

== See also ==
- List of ring roads
- List of cities with defensive walls
