= Stephansplatz, Hamburg =

Square in Hamburg, Germany

Coordinates: 53.5577°N 9.9887°E

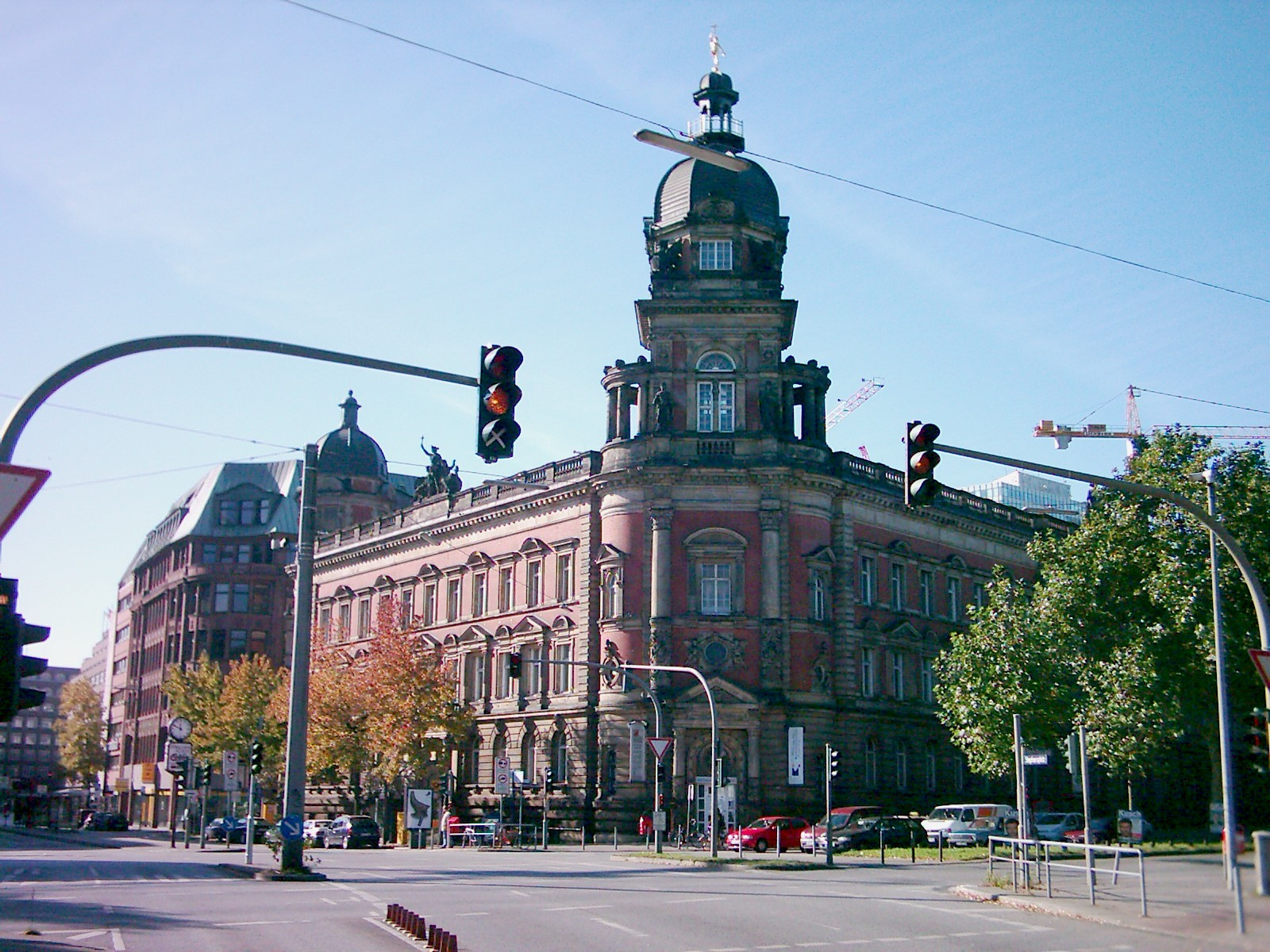
Alte Oberpostdirektion at Stephansplatz in 2007

Stephansplatz (Stephan Square) is a square in Neustadt quarter, Hamburg, Germany. It is located at the junction of the streets of Dammtordamm, Esplanade, Dammtorstraße, and Gorch-Fock-Wall, south of Dammtor area and Dammtor station. The square is named after German Empire post director Heinrich von Stephan, who is known for his role in the founding of the Universal Postal Union. The square and a small part of the streets of Dammtordamm and Dammtorstraße had been renamed in the course of the inauguration of the historical building of Alte Oberpostdirektion (Old Hamburg Post Office Administration) at the square.

== History ==
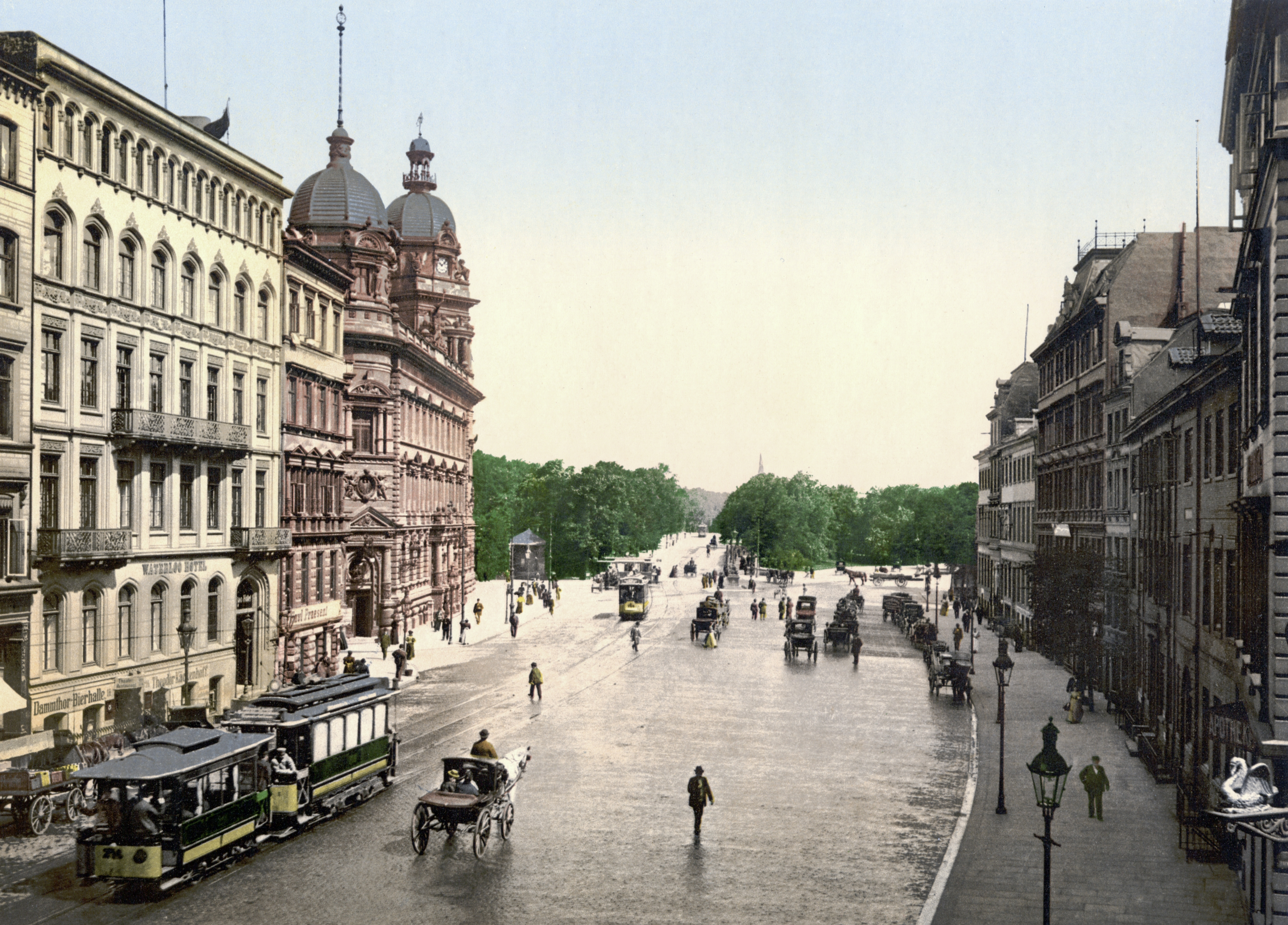
Stephansplatz around 1900

The oldest preserved building is the classicistic corner building Esplanade/Dammtorstraße from 1829. It was already scheduled for demolition, but then protected as a heritage site. The roof section was redesigned.

Stephansplatz was renamed in 1887, when the Post Office Administration building was inaugurated. The building was constructed from 1883 to 1887 and was expanded in 1897. The building is listed since 1997. Since 2011, it was gutted and remodeled as a "Work Life Center", and only the facade and the entrance hall were preserved, some other parts were re-built in a similar style. The Museum für Kommunikation Hamburg, which was formerly located within the building, was closed in 2009 and has been liquidated since.

At the square, the historical building of Casino Esplanade, former Hotel Esplanade, built in 1907, is located. Until 2005, a footbridge led from Dammtor area through the building to the shopping street of Colonnaden.

In 1922, the first traffic lights of Germany, earlier than at Berlin Potsdamer Platz, were erected at Stephansplatz.

The KellJung line of Hamburg U-Bahn, later known as U1 line, was built below the square until 1929, when also the Stephansplatz station opened.
