= Postage stamps and postal history of Hamburg =

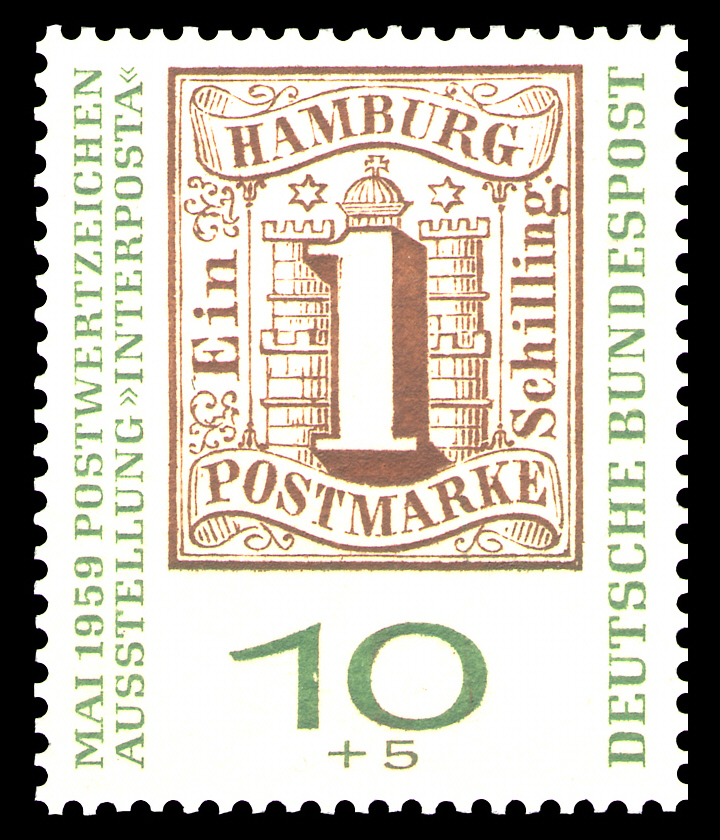
Hamburg stamp as a motif of the German Post Office

This article is about the postage stamps and postal history of Hamburg from the medieval messengers until the entry of the Hamburg Postal Administration into the Northern German Postal District in 1868.

== Historical development ==
After the foundation of the German Hanseatic League in the late Middle Ages, so-called regulated messenger hauls were formed, which were used to transport messages from Hamburg via Lübeck, Rostock, Stettin, Danzig, and Königsberg to Riga, as well as via Bremen to Amsterdam and via Celle and Braunschweig to Nuremberg.

In 1649, a Danish post office opened in Hamburg. In the 17th century, the Thurn und Taxis post settled down in Hamburg; the post and goods carriage, with royal privileges, was established between Hamburg and Nuremberg.

In 1810, Napoleon annexed the three Hanseatic cities and the northwest of Germany in the course of the Continental System against Great Britain.

After the end of the French occupation, several post offices were re-established in Hamburg. The Hanseatic city had its own post offices in Hamburg and Ritzebüttel. In the Hamburg city post office (Mengstraße No. 43), the Swedish-Norwegian post, the post of Thurn and Taxis (Mengstraße No. 48), and the post of Hannover were housed. The Prussian Central Post Office, the Mecklenburg Post, and the Danish Post worked in their own buildings.

A register was available where one could look up where to hand over his post for different destinations. The post to England and overseas was delivered by the city post. The Thurn und Taxis post was in charge of the post to France, Spain, Portugal, Italy, Belgium, and Switzerland. Prussia delivered the post to Russia and Poland, as well as to Turkey via Austria. Scandinavia was supplied by the Danish or the Swedish-Norwegian post.

Starting in 1796, the post to Heligoland, which belonged to Denmark at that time, was delivered by a Hamburg postal agent, as there was a Hamburg postal agency on Heligoland.

On 1 January 1852, Hamburg joined the German-Austrian Postal Union. Since 1866, Hamburg was part of the North German Confederation, which took over the postal service in the North German Postal District on 1 January 1868.

== Stamps ==
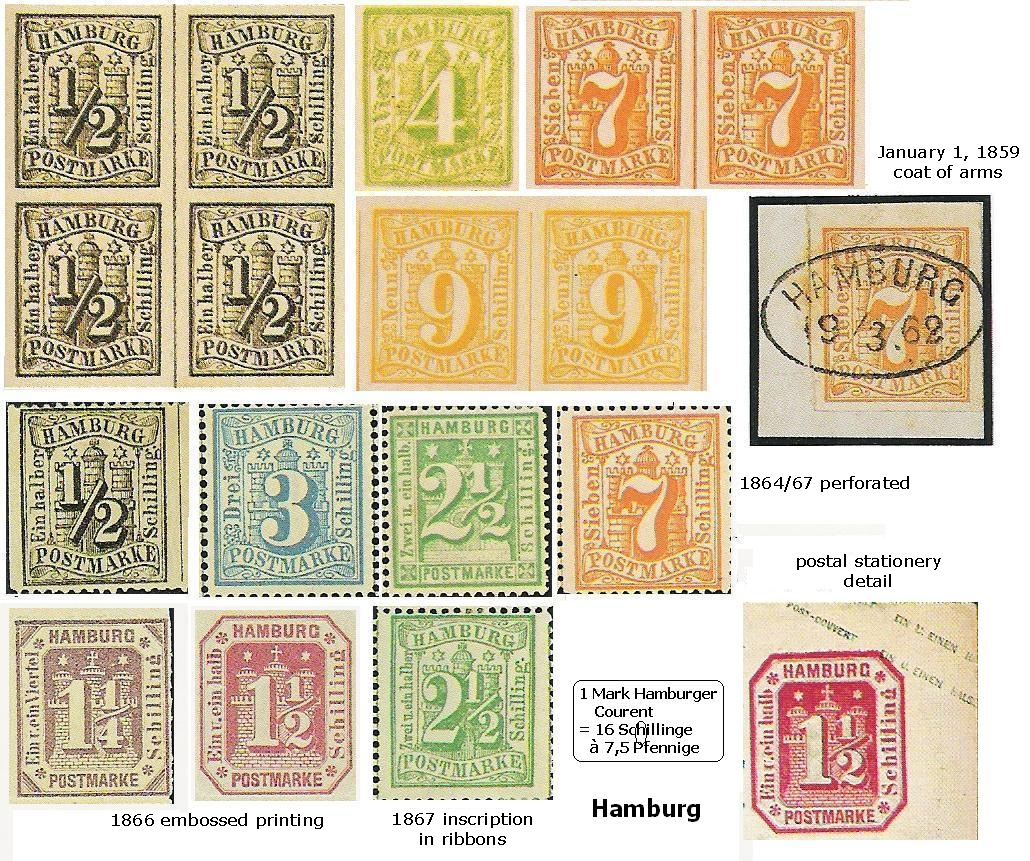
Stamps of the Hamburg City Post

=== Postage stamps of the Hamburg City Post ===
The first postage stamps of the Hamburg City Post Office were introduced on 1 January 1859. They were rectangular and in the middle was the coat of arms of the city, overlaid with the value number. Below that is the word Postmarke (postage stamp), above it is Hamburg. Value and currency (Schilling) are imprinted as text at the borders. Values of ½, 1, 2, 3, 4, 7, and 9 Schillinge were issued. In 1864, the supplemental values 1.25 and 2.5 Schillinge with a different frame design were issued. These early issues were already gummed but still imperforated. The following nine values, issued in 1864 and 1867 and again with the design of the first issues, finally had perforations. In 1866, another two values with a different octagonal frame design were issued; and on 5 May 1867, another one with the design of the first stamps. Hamburg's stamps were only valid until the end of 1867, since as of 1 January 1868, only the stamps of the North German Postal District were valid.

=== Stamps of the Institute of Hamburg's Messengers ===
The Institute of Hamburg's Messengers issued a stamp with the value of ½ Schilling. The private company delivered only letters and newspapers within the city of Hamburg and charged half a Schilling. The stamps were printed in black on coloured paper.

== See also ==
- Postage stamps and postal history of Bergedorf
