= Dammtor =

Coordinates: 53°33′43″N 09°59′27″E

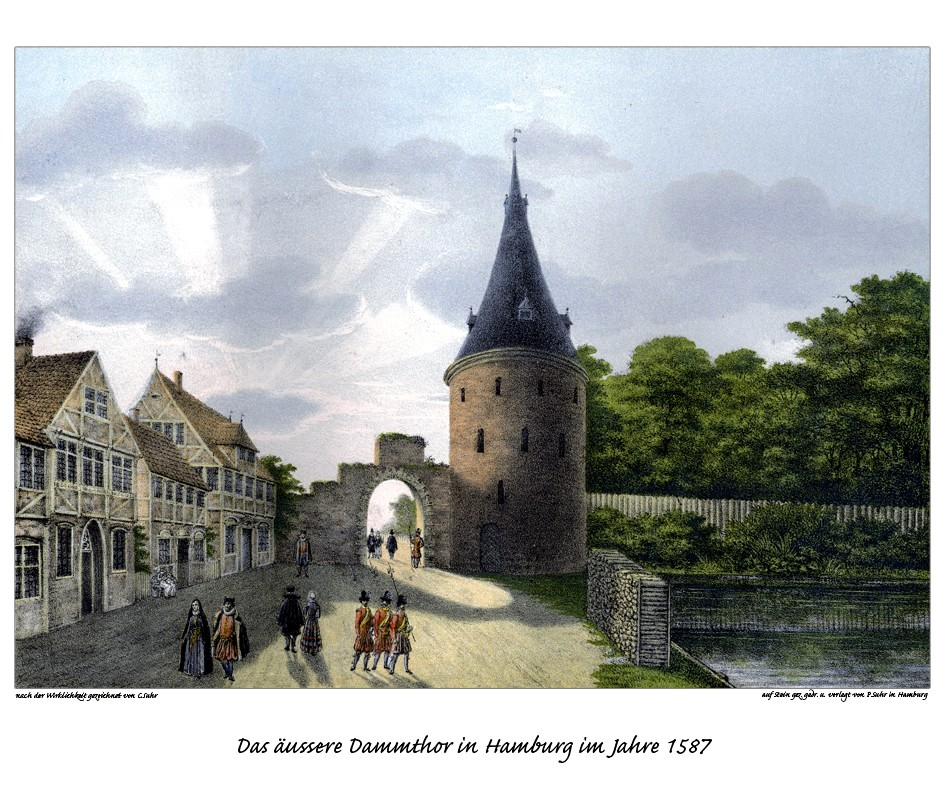
19th century painting of Dammtor in 1587

Dammtor (German pronunciation: [ˈdamtoːɐ], lit. 'Dam Gate') is a zone (Ort) of the German city of Hamburg, situated between the quarters of Rotherbaum (in the borough of Eimsbüttel) and Neustadt (in the borough of Mitte).

== History ==
Originally, the Dammthor was a city gate between the Altstadt (Old town) and the Neustadt (New town). In 1866, before the opening of the Hamburg-Altona railway, the city opened a railway station at Dammtordamm, replaced in 1903 by the current Hamburg Dammtor station.

== Geography ==
Dammtor is situated in the middle of Hamburg, close to the Außenalster lake and to the central railway station. Its area includes the parks of Moorweide, Gustav-Mahler-Park (with a Multiplex Cinema) and the old entrance of Planten un Blomen (with the Old botanical garden).

Other notable infrastructure located in Dammtor are the rail station, the Stephansplatz, the main building of the University of Hamburg, the Congress Center, the Radisson SAS Hotel and the war memorial. Regarding the urban transport the area is served both by S-Bahn (by Dammtor station) and U-Bahn (by Stephansplatz station).

== Photogallery ==
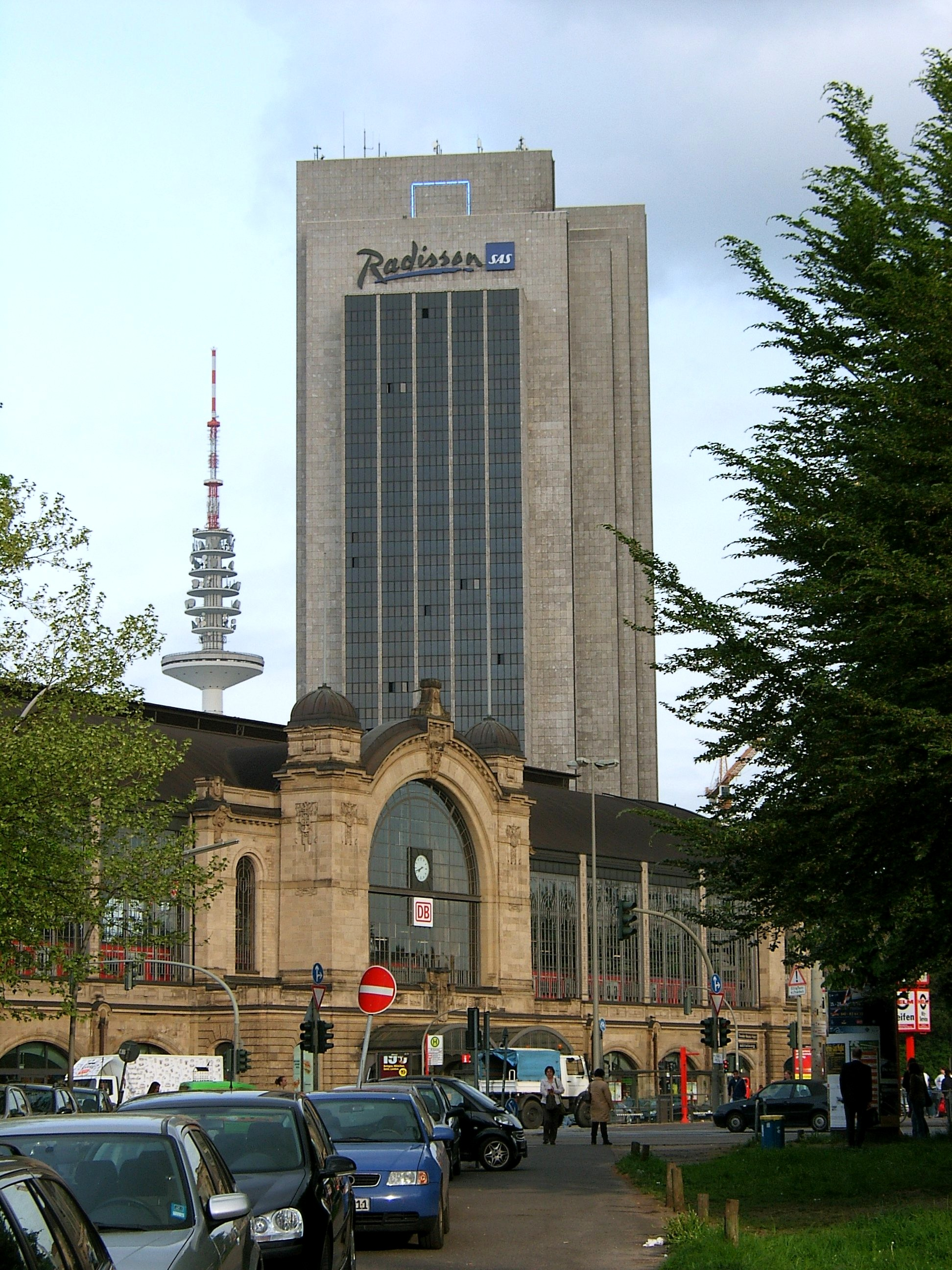
Railway station (2006), with in background the Congress Center Hotel and the Heinrich-Hertz-Turm

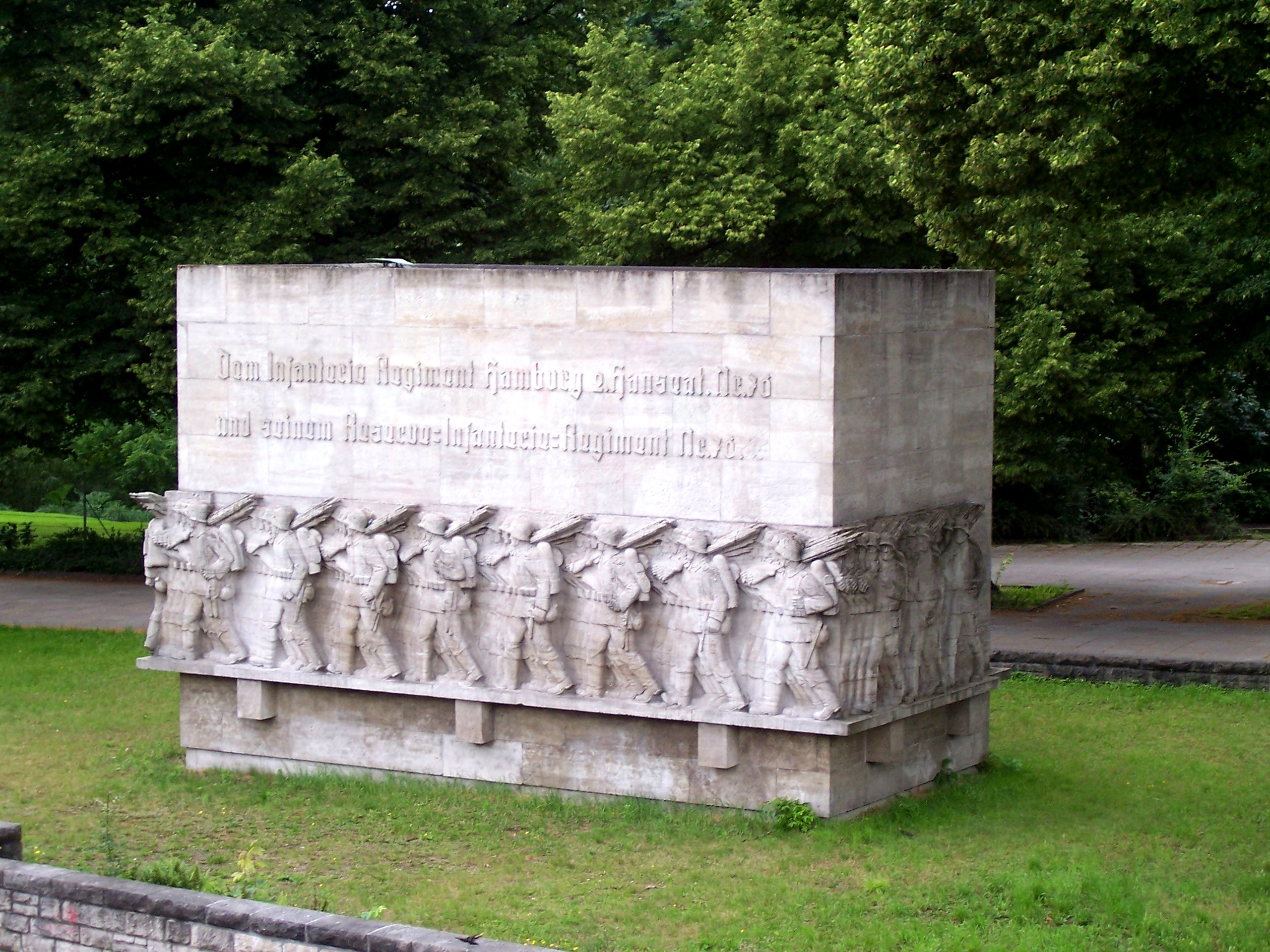
The war memorial (Kriegerdenkmal) at Dammtordamm

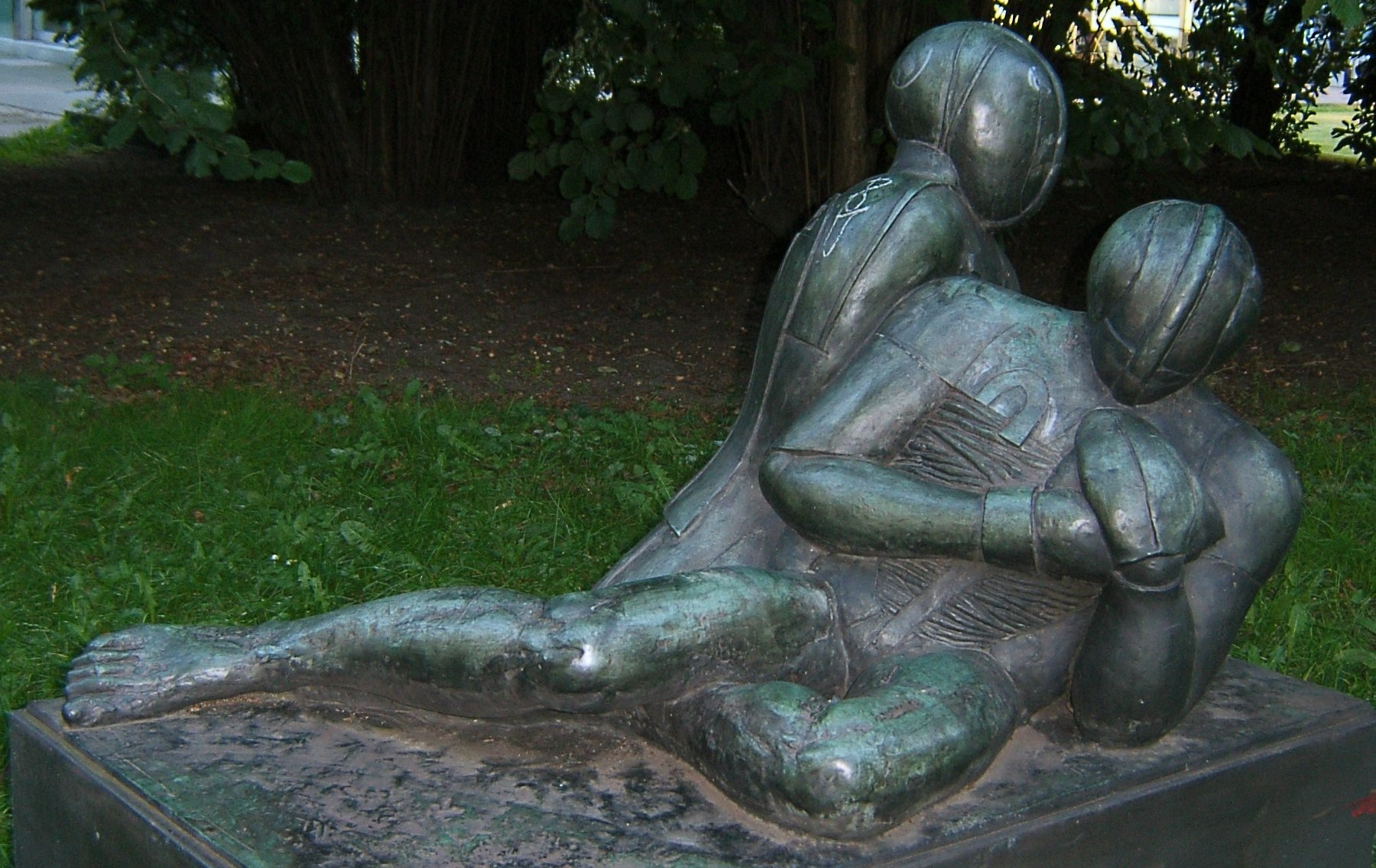
Statues in the Gustav-Mahler-Park

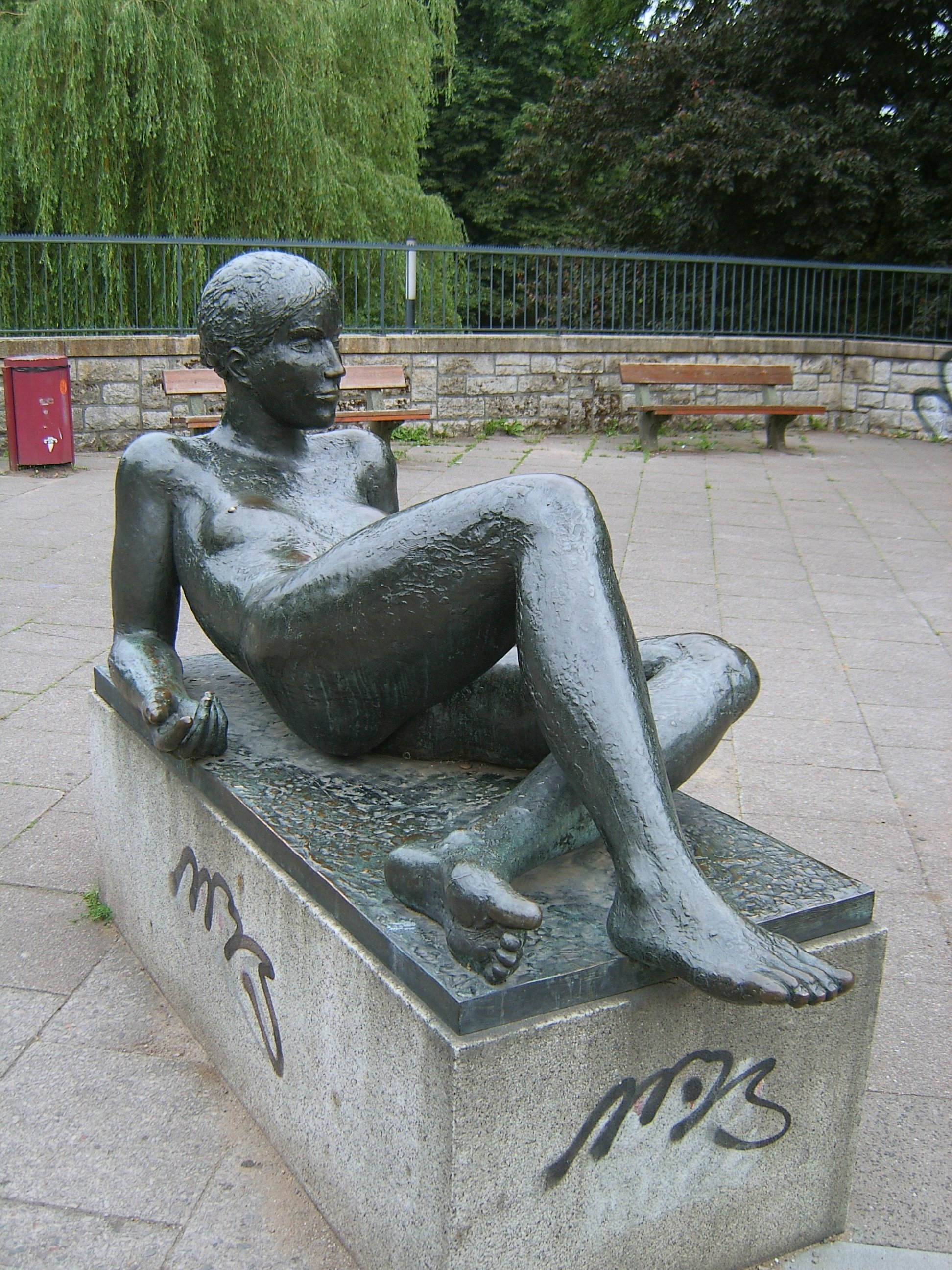
A statue in the Old Botanic Garden at Stephansplatz
