= Hamburg Dammtor station =

Railway station in Hamburg, Germany

Hamburg Dammtor
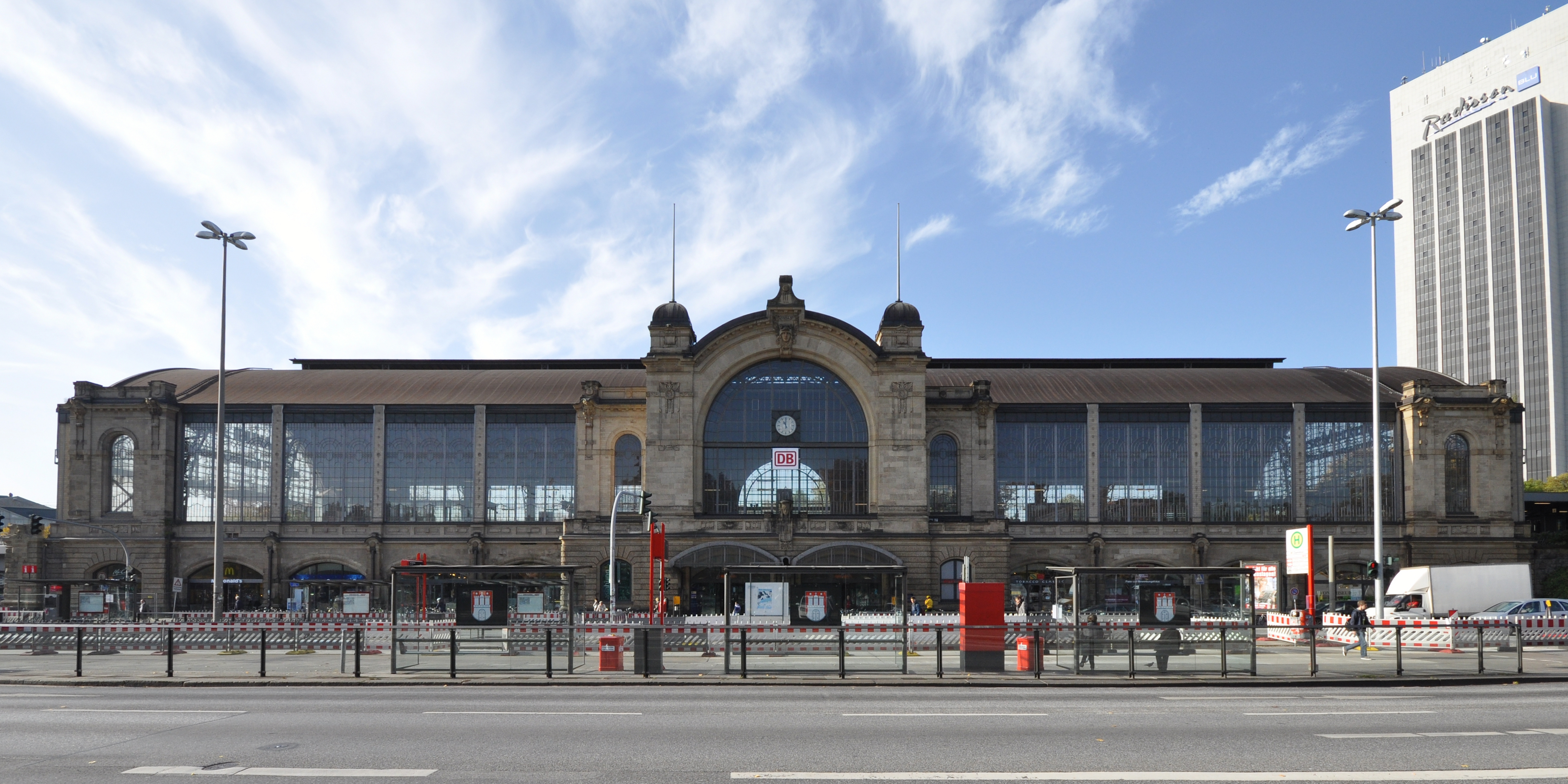
- Northeast side, in 2012

General information
- Location: Dag-Hammarskjöld-Platz 15, 20354 Hamburg, Germany
- Coordinates: 53°33′39″N 9°59′22″E
- Line: S2 S5
- Platforms: 2 side platforms
- Tracks: 4
- Connections: Bus

Construction
- Structure type: Elevated
- Platform levels: 1
- Accessible: Yes

Other information
- Station code: ds100: ADF (main line); DB station code: 2513; Type: Hp; Category: 2
- Fare zone: HVV: A/000
- Website: www.bahnhof.de

History
- Opened: 16 July 1866; 160 years ago
- Rebuilt: 7 June 1903; 123 years ago
- Electrified: 29 January 1908; 118 years ago, 6.3 kV AC system (overhead; turned off in 1955); 10 April 1941; 85 years ago, 1.2 kV DC system (3rd rail); 6 April 1965; 61 years ago, 15 kV AC system (overhead)
Services
Preceding station	DB Fernverkehr	Following station
Hamburg-Altona Terminus	ICE 4 Sprinter	Hamburg Hbf towards Frankfurt Airport Regional
Hamburg-Altona towards Berlin Gesundbrunnen or Hamburg-Altona	ICE 18	Hamburg Hbf towards München Hbf
Neumünster towards Kiel Hbf	ICE 22	Hamburg Hbf towards Stuttgart Hbf
Hamburg-Altona Terminus	ICE 24	Hamburg Hbf towards Innsbruck Hbf or Schwarzach-St.Veit
Hamburg-Altona Terminus	ICE 25	Hamburg Hbf towards München Hbf
Neumünster towards Hamburg-Altona, Kiel Hbf or København H	RJ 27	Hamburg Hbf towards Praha hl.n.
Hamburg-Altona Terminus	ICE 28	Hamburg Hbf towards München Hbf
Hamburg-Altona Terminus	ICE 43	Hamburg Hbf towards Basel SBB, Chur or Brig
Hamburg-Altona Terminus	ICE 91	Hamburg Hbf towards Wien Hbf
Preceding station	ÖBB	Following station
Hamburg-Altona Terminus	Nightjet	Hamburg Hbf One-way operation
Hamburg-Altona Terminus	Nightjet	Hamburg Hbf towards Zürich HB
Preceding station	DB Regio Nord	Following station
Elmshorn towards Flensburg or Kiel Hbf	RE 7	Hamburg Hbf Terminus
Elmshorn towards Kiel Hbf	RE 70	Hamburg Hbf Terminus
Preceding station		Following station
Pinneberg towards Itzehoe	RB 61	Hamburg Hbf Terminus
Preceding station	Hamburg S-Bahn	Following station
Sternschanze towards Hamburg-Altona	S2	Hamburg Hbf towards Aumühle
Sternschanze towards Elbgaustraße	S5	Hamburg Hbf towards Stade
Location

Hamburg Dammtor is a railway station for long distance, regional and suburban trains on the Hamburg-Altona link line, located in Central Hamburg, Germany. In front is a bus station of the same name for public transport.

The railway station is one of five long-distance train stations in Hamburg. The other stations are Hamburg Hauptbahnhof, Hamburg-Altona, Hamburg-Harburg and Hamburg-Bergedorf. Despite its size and importance, the station is classified as a railway stop (Haltepunkt) because it does not have any switches, a requirement for a station (Bahnhof) according to the regulations.

== History ==
The name Dammtor originates from an old city gate located here until the end of the 19th century. The present railway station was opened on 7 July 1903. A previous station, built in 1866, was located around 100 metres (330 ft) away.

== Location ==
Hamburg Dammtor is close to the Wallring and the center of Hamburg, located in the quarter Rotherbaum of the Eimsbüttel borough. Nearby are also the University of Hamburg and the Congress Center Hamburg. As a result, the railway station signs have the addition Messe- und Kongressbahnhof (trade fair and congress station).

== Gallery ==
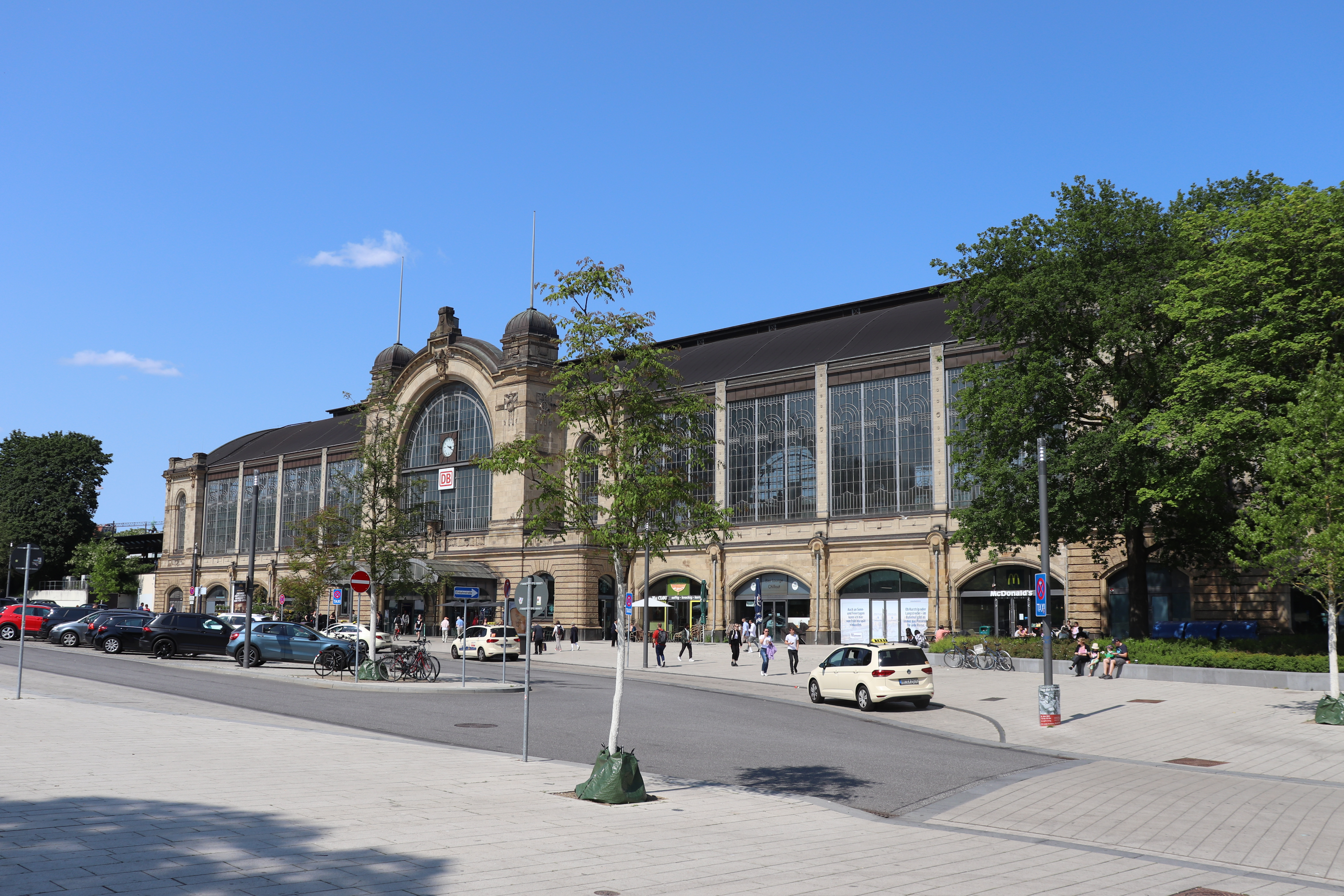
Southwest face on the Dag-Hammarskjöld-Platz, in 2023

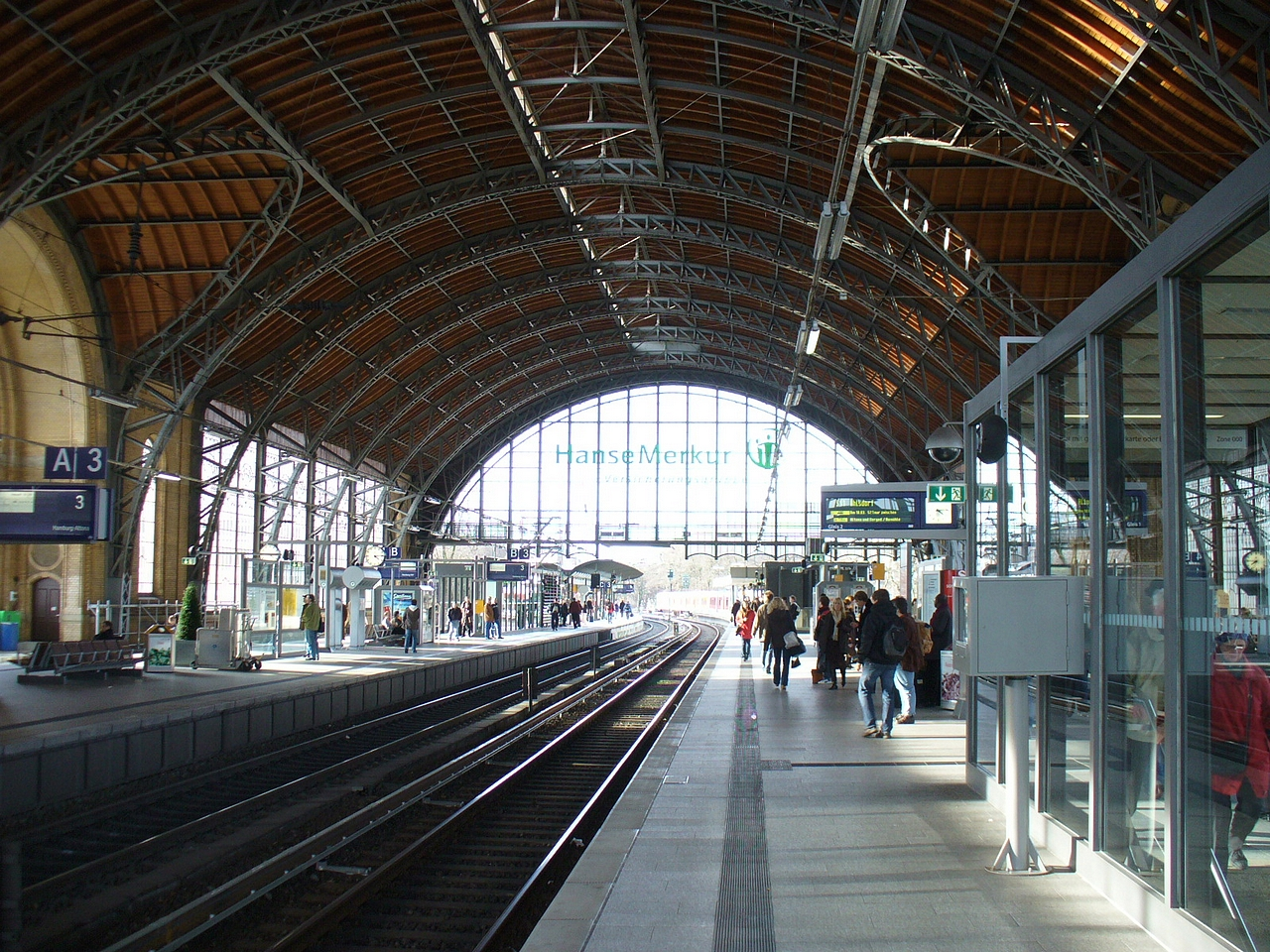
Platforms inside the train hall, 2007

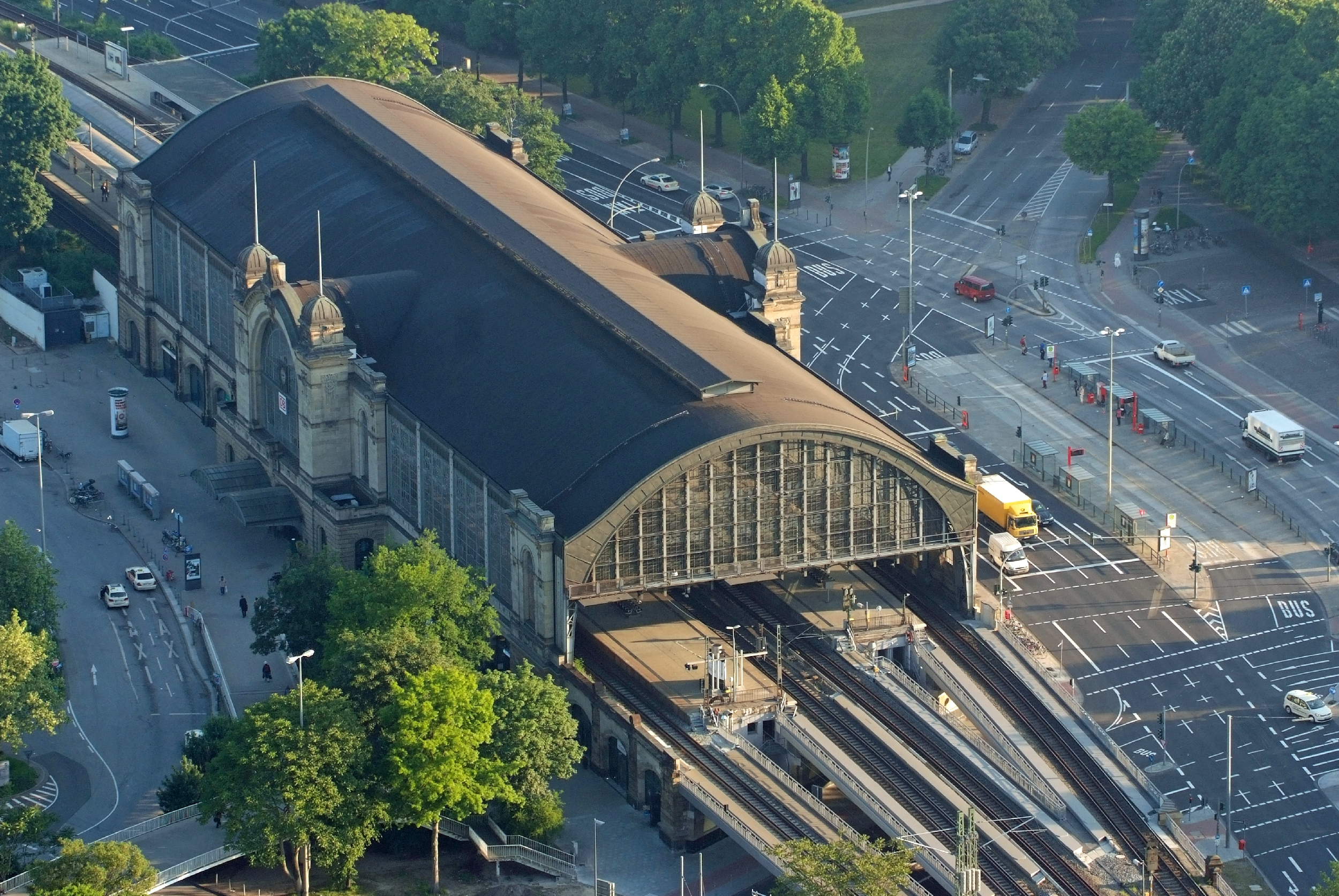
Aerial view from the south, 2013

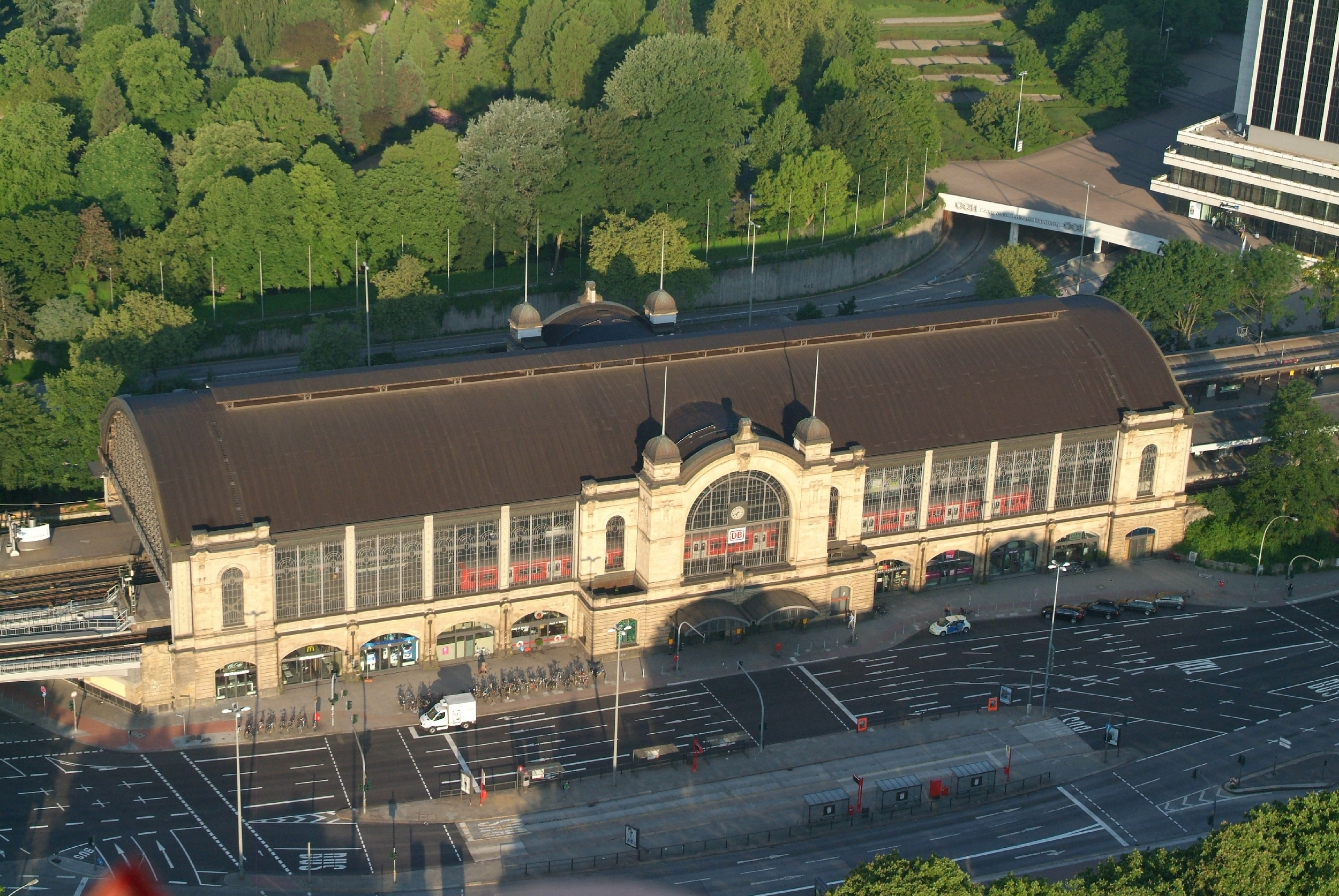
Aerial view from the east, 2013

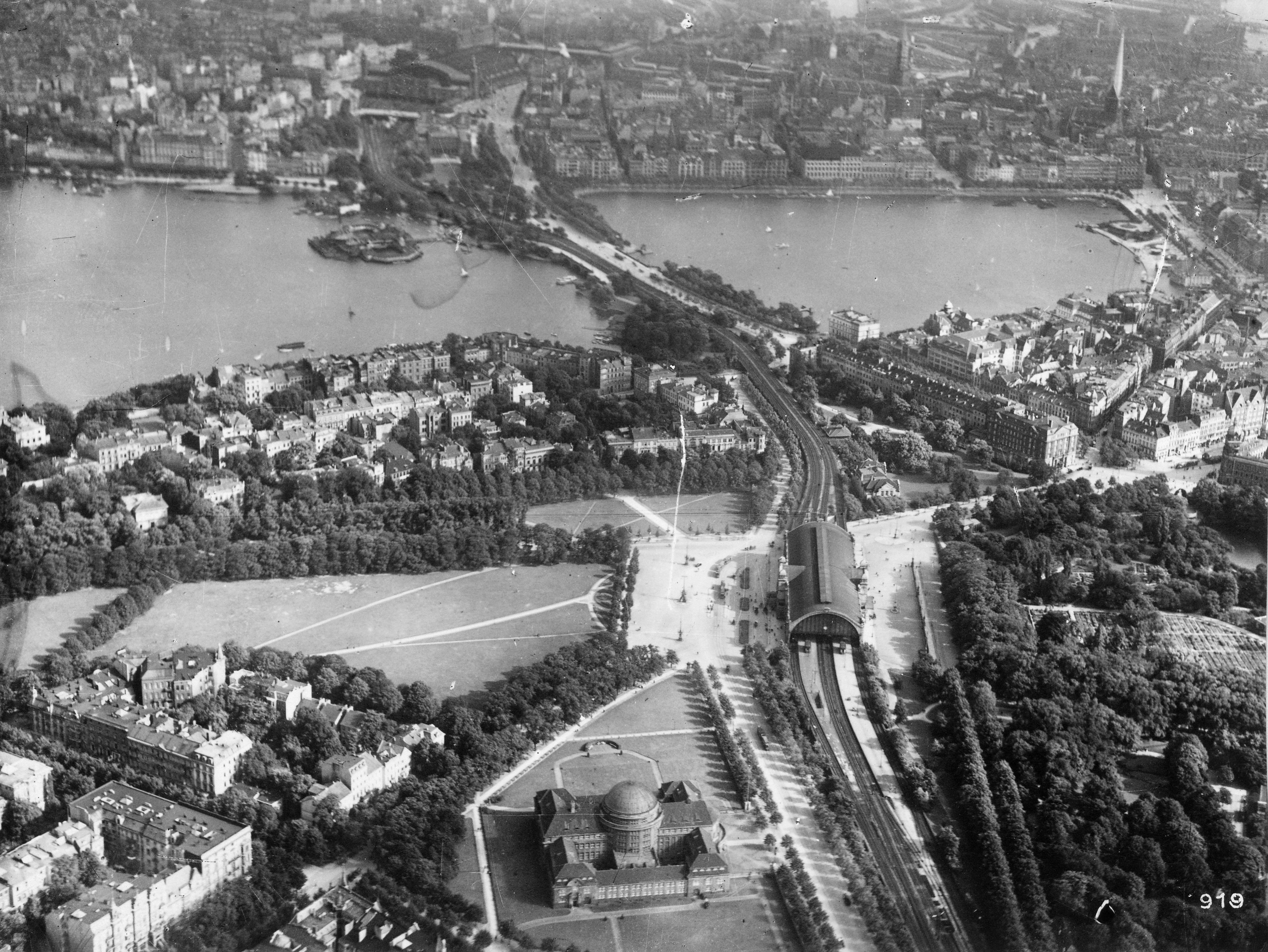
Aerial photo from 1920

== Service ==
The railway station has 4 elevated tracks, on two island platforms, one servicing the regional and long-distance trains, the other platform servicing the S-Bahn. In the 2026 timetable, the following services stop at the station:

Line	Route		Frequency
ICE 4	Hamburg-Altona – Hamburg-Dammtor – Hamburg – Hanover – Frankfurt – Frankfurt Airport		Three times a day
ICE 18	Hamburg-Altona – Hamburg-Dammtor – Hamburg Hbf – Berlin – Halle – Erfurt – Nuremberg – Ingolstadt – Munich		Every two hours
ICE 22	Kiel – Hamburg Dammtor – Hamburg Hbf – Hannover – Göttingen – Kassel – Frankfurt – Frankfurt Airport – Mannheim (– Heidelberg) – Stuttgart		Every two hours
ICE 24	Hamburg-Altona – Hamburg Dammtor – Hamburg – Hanover – Kassel – Würzburg – Augsburg – Munich –	Schwarzach-St. Veit	Some trains
ICE 24	Hamburg-Altona – Hamburg Dammtor – Hamburg – Hanover – Kassel – Würzburg – Augsburg – Munich –	Innsbruck	Some trains
ICE 25	Hamburg-Altona – Hamburg Dammtor – Hamburg Hbf – Hannover – Kassel-Wilhelmshöhe – Fulda – Würzburg – Nuremberg – Ingolstadt – Munich		Hourly
RJ 27	Hamburg-Altona – Hamburg Dammtor – Hamburg Hbf – Berlin – Dresden – Prague		Every two hours
ICE 28	Hamburg-Altona – Hamburg Dammtor – Hamburg Hbf – Berlin – Leipzig – Erfurt – Nuremberg – Augsburg / Ingolstadt – Munich		Every two hours
ICE 43	Hamburg-Altona – Hamburg Dammtor – Hamburg – Bremen – Münster – Dortmund – Essen – Düsseldorf – Cologne – Frankfurt Airport – Mannheim – Karlsruhe – Freiburg – Basel		Every two hours

=== Regional services ===
Line	Route	Operator
RE 7	Flensburg – Neumünster – Hamburg Dammtor – Hamburg	DB Regio Nord
RE 70	Kiel – Neumünster – Hamburg Dammtor – Hamburg	DB Regio Nord
RB 61	Itzehoe – Elmshorn – Hamburg Dammtor – Hamburg	Nordbahn Eisenbahngesellschaft

== See also ==
- Dammtor
- Hamburg S-Bahn
- Hamburger Verkehrsverbund
