= Stadthausbrücke station =

Railway station in Hamburg, Germany

Stadthausbrücke
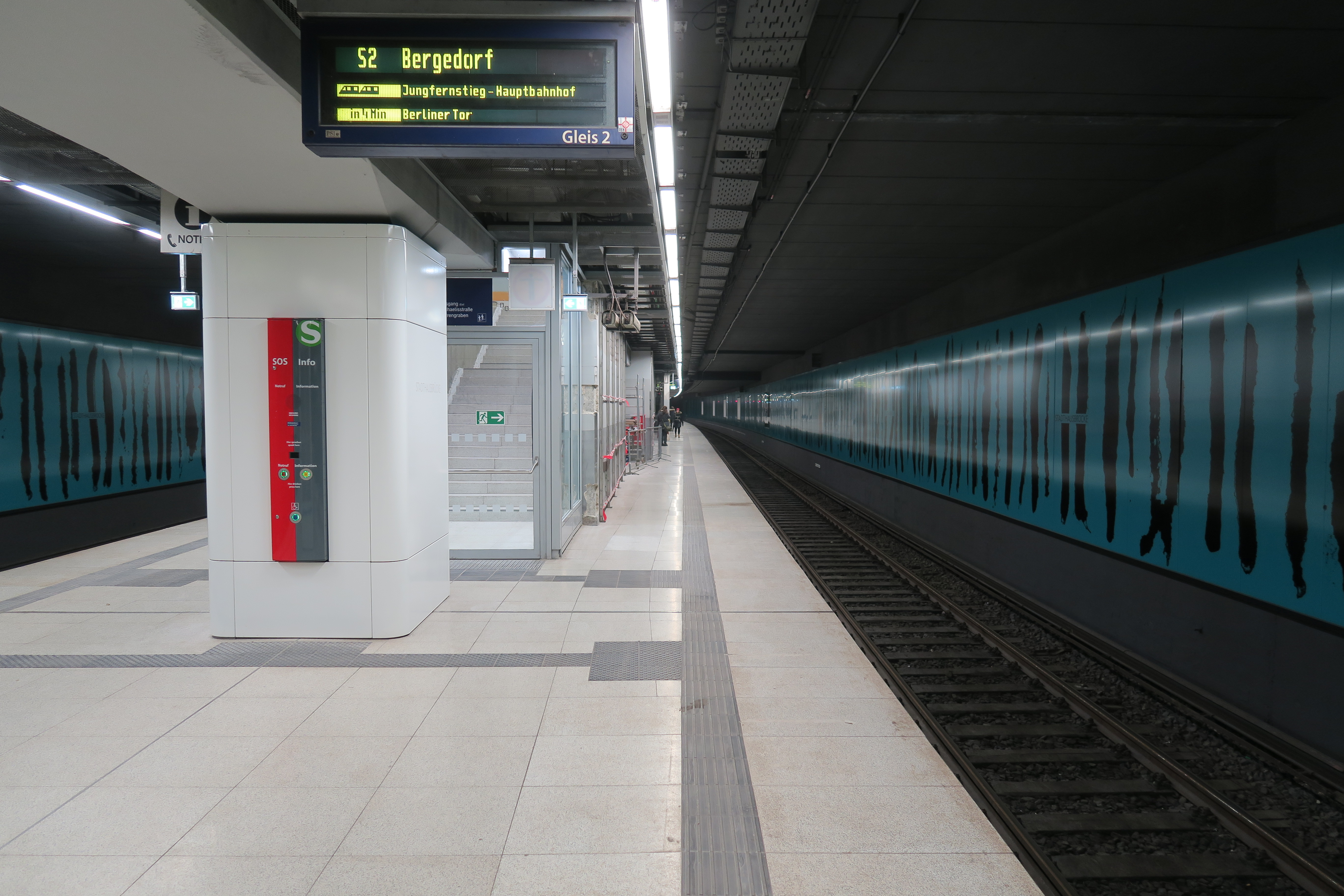

General information
- Location: Neuer Wall; 20355 Hamburg, Germany
- Coordinates: 53°32′57″N 9°59′11″E
- Owner: DB Station&Service AG
- Platforms: 1 island platform
- Tracks: 2
- Connections: Bus

Construction
- Structure type: Underground

Other information
- Station code: ds100: ASHS; DB station code: 5955; Type: Bft; Category: 4
- Fare zone: HVV: A/000

History
- Opened: 1 June 1975; 51 years ago
- Electrified: at opening

Services
Preceding station	Hamburg S-Bahn	Following station
Landungsbrücken towards Wedel	S1	Jungfernstieg towards Poppenbüttel or Hamburg Airport
Landungsbrücken towards Pinneberg	S3	Jungfernstieg towards Hamburg-Neugraben
Location
- Location within Hamburg Location within Schleswig-Holstein Location within Germany Location within Europe

Stadthausbrücke is an underground railway station, on the City S-Bahn line of the Hamburg S-Bahn. The station is located in New Town quarter of the Hamburg borough of Mitte (centre), Germany. The station is managed by DB Station&Service.

== History ==
In October 1967, the work the city tunnel line from central station to Altona station started. On 1 June 1975 — at the start of the summer schedule — the Hamburg S-Bahn opened Stadthausbrücke station, within the line from central station to Landungsbrücken station.

== Layout ==
The station is an underground island platform with 2 tracks and two exits. The station is now accessible for handicapped persons, because a lift has been installed, however there is no special floor layout for blind persons. In case of war it also has its function as a fallout-shelter for 4,500 persons like the Reeperbahn and Harburg-Rathaus stations, too.

== Services ==
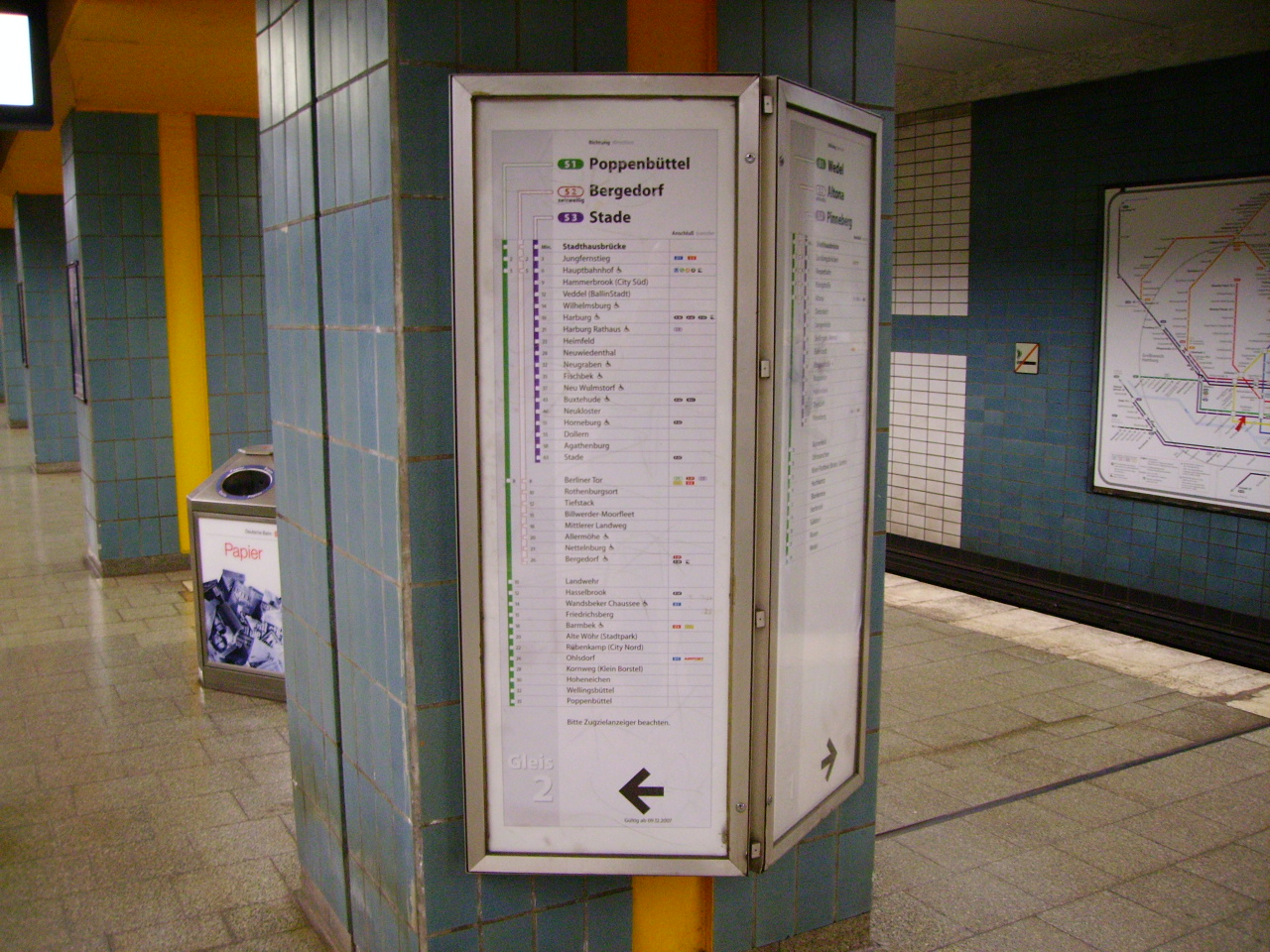
Detail (plan of trains for track 2) of Stadthausbrücke station

=== Trains ===
The rapid transit trains of the lines S1 and S3 of the Hamburg S-Bahn are calling the station. Direction of the trains on track 1 is Wedel (S1) and Pinneberg (S3). On track 2 the trains are traveling in the direction Poppenbüttel (S1) and Neugraben (S3) via Hamburg central station.

=== Facilities ===
No personnel is attending the station, but there are SOS and information telephones, and ticket machines.

== See also ==
- Hamburger Verkehrsverbund (HVV)
- List of Hamburg S-Bahn stations
