= Jungfernstieg station =

Railway station in Hamburg, Germany

Jungfernstieg
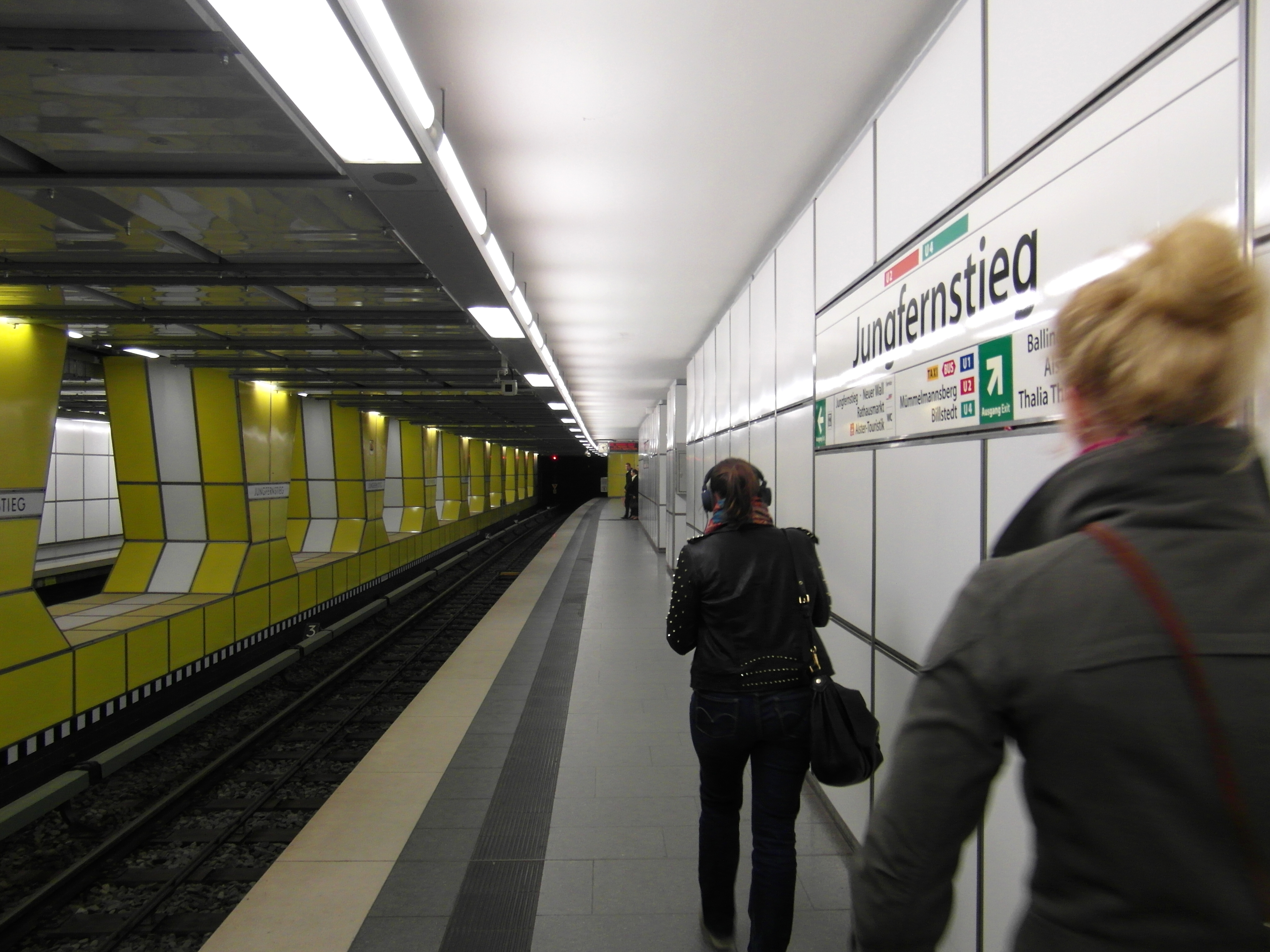

General information
- Location: Jungfernstieg 12; 20095 Hamburg, Germany
- Coordinates: 53°33′13″N 9°59′33″E
- Operator: Hamburger Hochbahn AG; S-Bahn Hamburg GmbH
- Lines: S1 S3 U1 U2 U4
- Platforms: 4 island platforms
- Tracks: 8
- Connections: Rathaus U3 (100 m); Bus, Taxi, Alster ferries

Construction
- Structure type: Underground
- Depth: 20.5 metres (67 ft)
- Platform levels: 3
- Accessible: Yes

Other information
- Station code: U-Bahn: HHA: JG; S-Bahn: DB: 3086 ds100: AJUS; Type: Hp Category: 4
- Fare zone: HVV: A/000

History
- Opened: 25 March 1931; 95 years ago
- Rebuilt: 29 November 2012; 13 years ago (partially)
- Former names: 1931-1960 Jungfernstieg; 1960-1973 Rathaus

Services
Preceding station	Hamburg S-Bahn	Following station
Stadthausbrücke towards Wedel	S1	Hamburg Hbf towards Poppenbüttel or Hamburg Airport
Stadthausbrücke towards Pinneberg	S3	Hamburg Hbf towards Hamburg-Neugraben
Preceding station	Hamburg U-Bahn	Following station
Stephansplatz towards Norderstedt Mitte	U1	Meßberg towards Großhansdorf or Ohlstedt
Gänsemarkt towards Niendorf Nord	U2	Hauptbahnhof Nord towards Mümmelmannsberg
Überseequartier towards Elbbrücken	U4	Hauptbahnhof Nord towards Billstedt
Location
- Location within Hamburg Location within Schleswig-Holstein Location within Germany Location within Europe

Jungfernstieg (German pronunciation: [juːŋfɛʀnstiːk]) is an underground railway station in the city centre of Hamburg, Germany, served by the underground railway (U-Bahn) and the suburban railway (S-Bahn). The station is one of Hamburg's busiest rapid transit hubs.

Most of the station is located underwater, under the Alster River and the lakes Binnenalster and Kleine Alster. At this location, the Alster also forms the border between the two Hamburg districts Neustadt and Altstadt, both part of the borough of Hamburg-Mitte. The station is named after Jungfernstieg boulevard.

== History ==
On 25 March 1931, a first station was opened as part of the underground Kellinghusenstraße–Jungfernstieg railway line (Kelljung line) — now part of the U1. At first, the platforms were provisional and a little off its current location. On 2 January 1934 the proper Jungfernstieg station opened as Europe's first underwater railway station. The station had entrances on Jungfernstieg and Ballindamm, then in 1930s Art Deco fashion.

On 1 October 1958, the underground platforms between the Circle Line's Rathaus station and Jungfernstieg station were connected by an underpass, with additional entries on Rathausmarkt and Mönckebergstraße. Both stations were merged into one station and named "Rathaus".

In 1973, the diameter U-Bahn line U2 was completed between Gänsemarkt and Hauptbahnhof Nord, around the same time as the S-Bahn's first section of their so-called "City S-Bahn line" between Hauptbahnhof and Landungsbrücken (since 1975). Both lines received new platforms underneath the existing 1930s Jungfernstieg station on 1 June 1975. This now tripartite station was renamed back to "Jungfernstieg", with several connectors between the three parts, and additional entrances at Alstertor and Rathausmarkt. "Rathaus" was remade a separate station, since then only served by Circle Line U3. The 1950s underpass between Rathaus and Jungfernstieg was retained.

On 29 November 2012, the U-Bahn's U4 connection between Jungfernstieg and HafenCity Universität was opened, utilizing then unused tracks along the U2 platforms.

== Layout ==
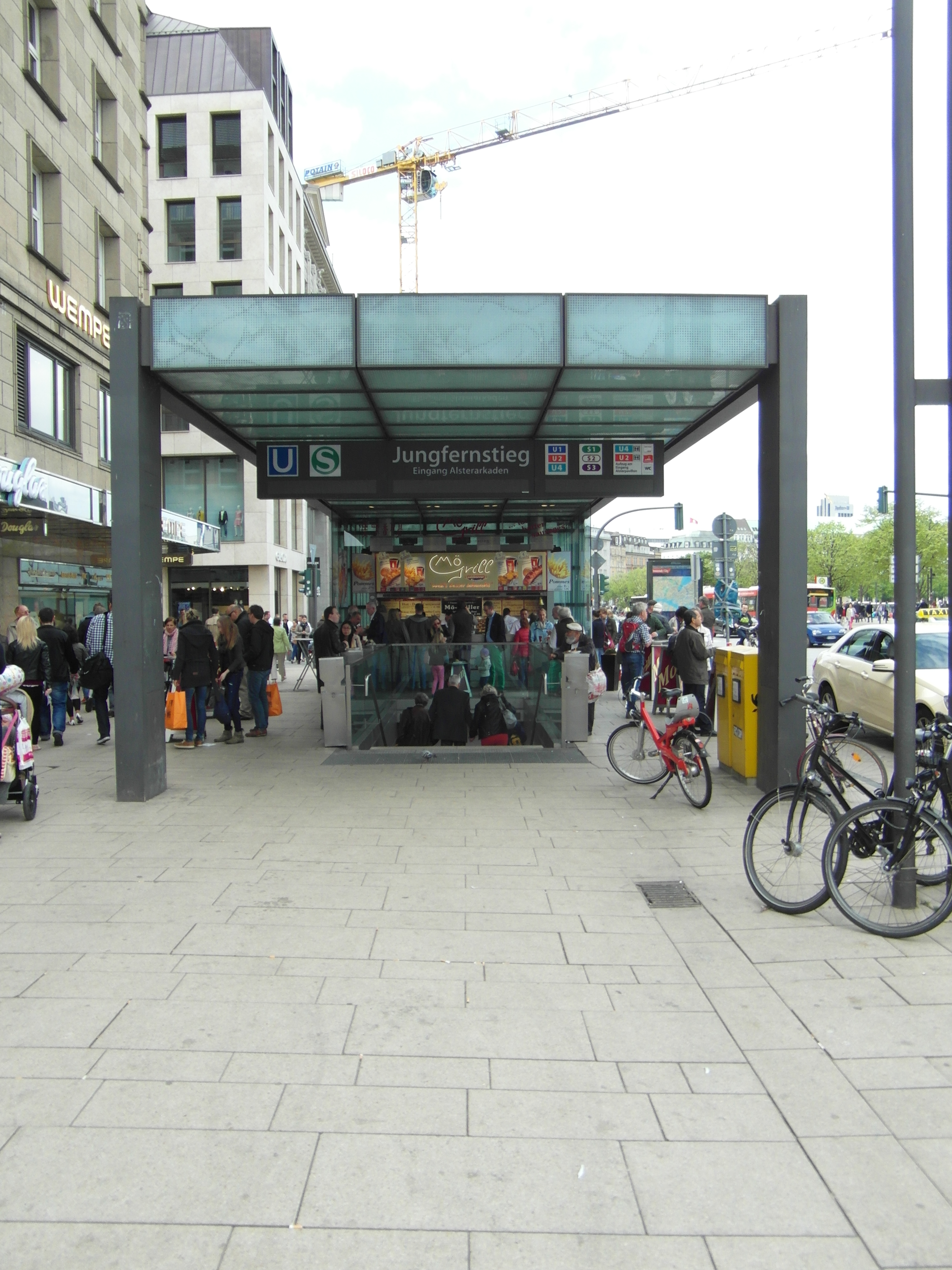
One of the sheltered entrances at Jungfernstieg and Neuer Wall

The station's three platform tubes form a sort of triangle. The 1930s U-Bahn U1 platform follows the course of Reesendammbrücke at two stories below street level. Below that, the S-Bahn platform runs in a slightly curved north–south direction and the U-Bahn U2/U4 platforms at the deepest running approximately east–west.

=== Entrances ===
Jungfernstieg station has over 20 entrances, spread around four ticket halls at Jungfernstieg, Ballindamm, Bergstraße and Rathausmarkt. Most recognizable are two sheltered entrances at the intersection of Jungfernstieg and Neuer Wall. The ticket hall at Bergstraße connects to nearby Rathaus station via a pedestrian underpass; the ticket hall at Rathausmarkt incorporates an underground shopping passage. Each of the three platform areas is linked to two of those ticket halls on either of their respective platforms' ends.

=== Platforms ===
Jungfernstieg station has four island platforms, with one being allocated to U-Bahn line U1, one to the three S-Bahn lines, and two shared by U-Bahn lines U2 and U4. The four tracks for U2 and U4 allow for same-direction cross-platform interchange in each direction. Besides the direct access of each platform to and from the ticket halls, each platform also has a direct connection to at least one of the other lines.

The 1930s built platform for line U1 is noticeably older than all others. When the U4 was added to the two platforms of line U2, the two platforms had to be re-fitted to meet current fire safety regulations. At this undertaking, the platforms for U2 and U4 were made handicap-accessible.

Photos of U-Bahn (U1) and S-Bahn (S1/S2/S3) platforms
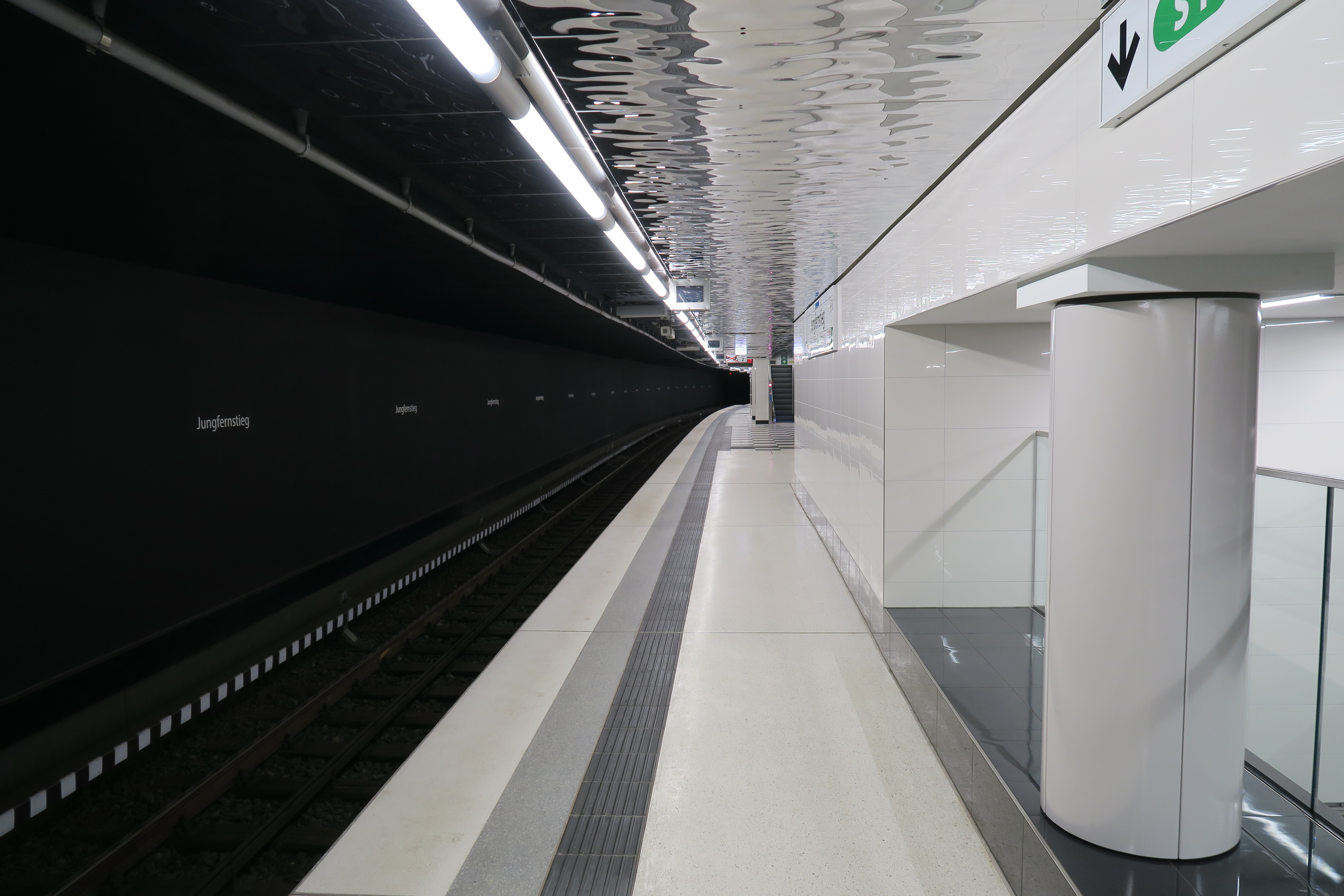
U1 platform (2021)

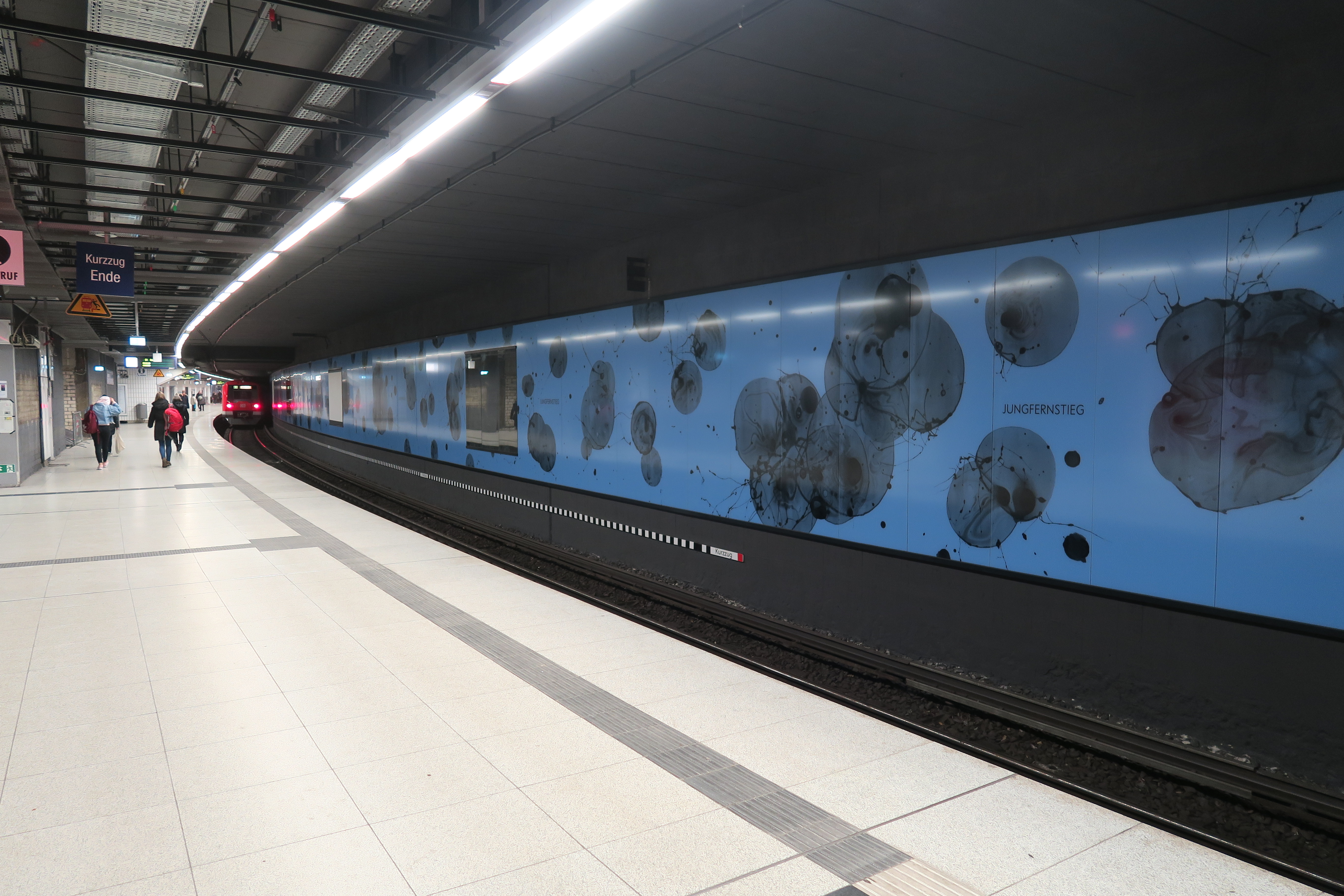
S-Bahn platform (2018)

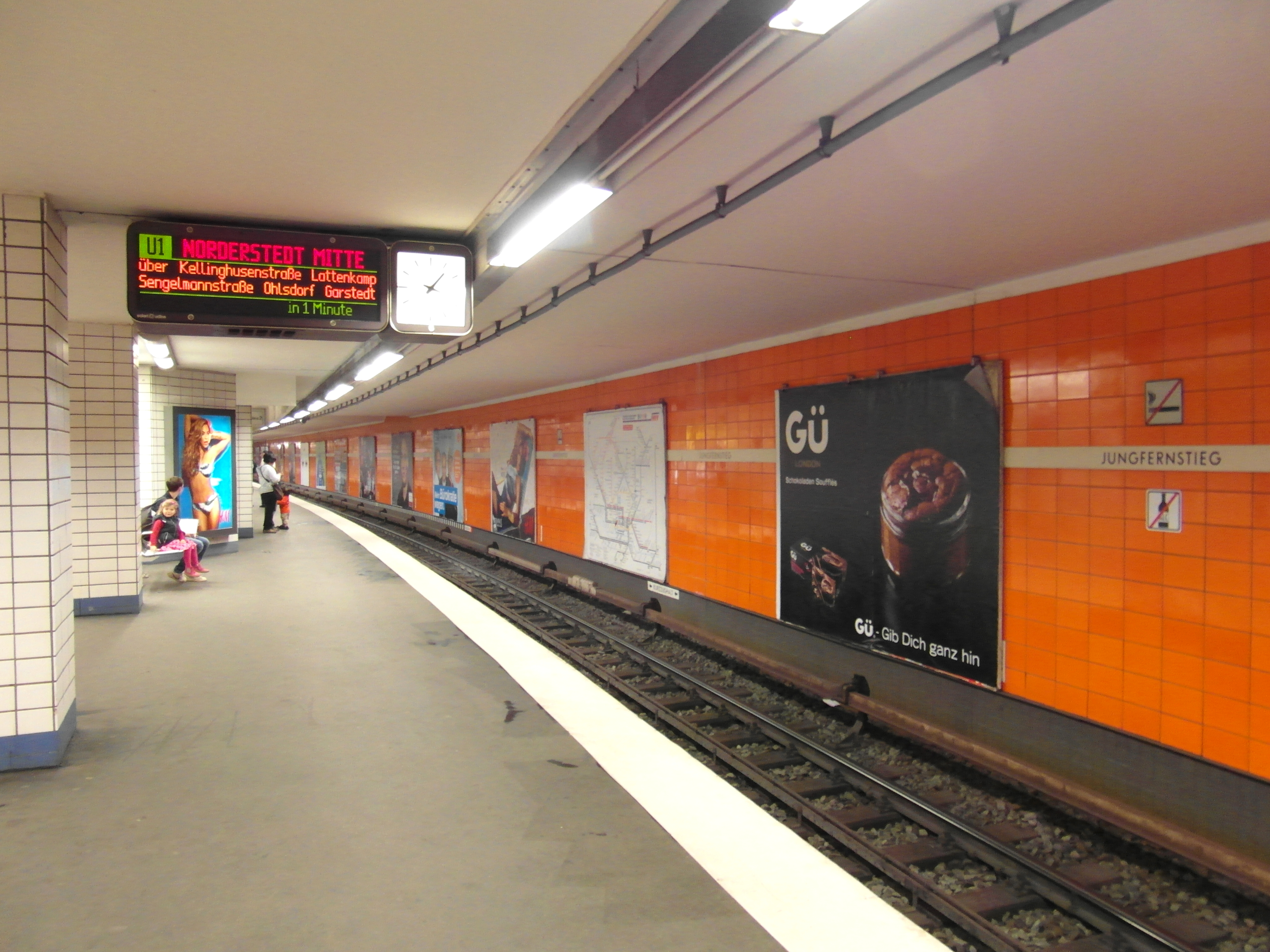
U1 platform (2013)

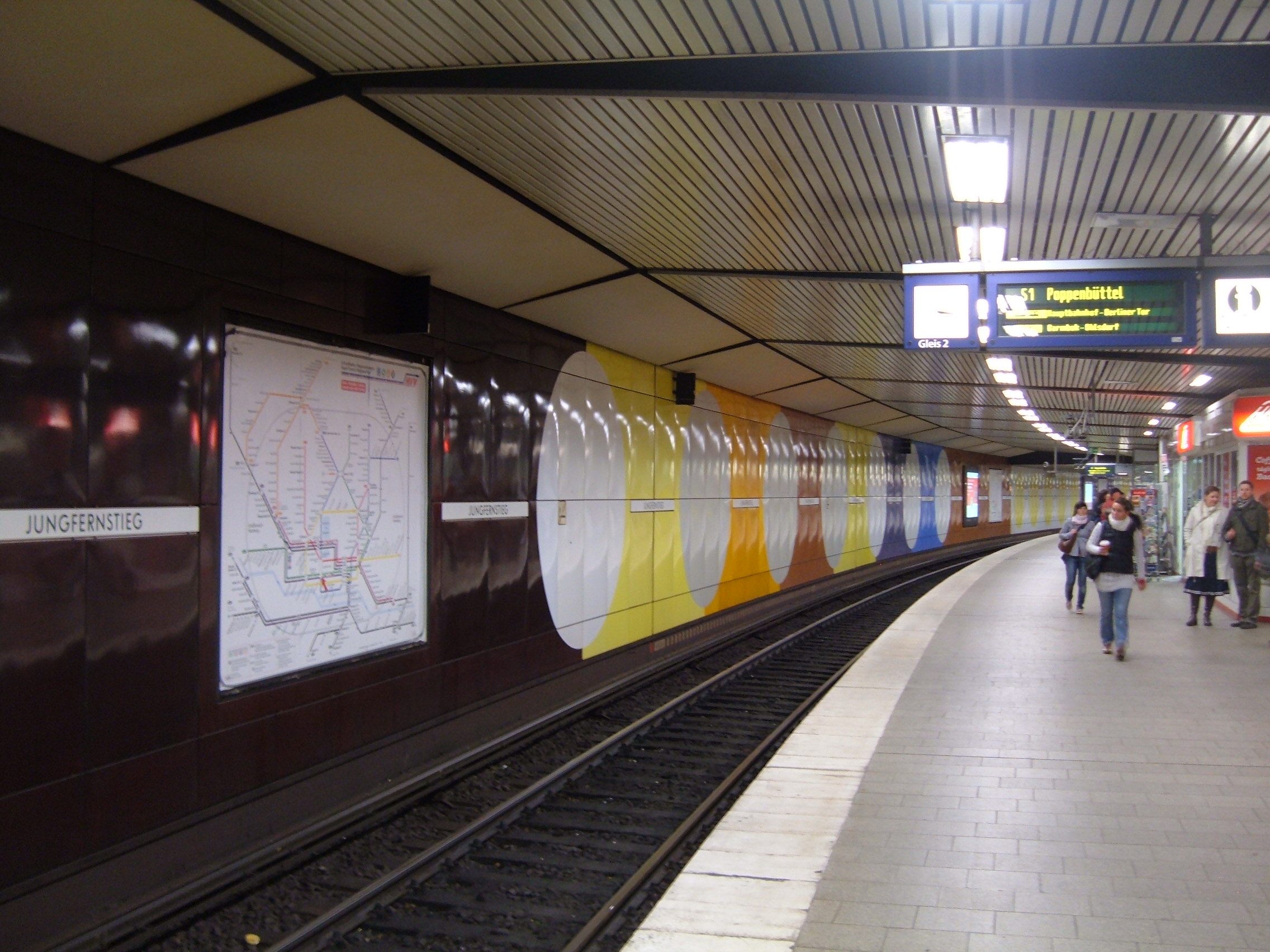
S-Bahn platform (2008)
Photos of U-Bahn (U2/U4) mezzanine and platforms
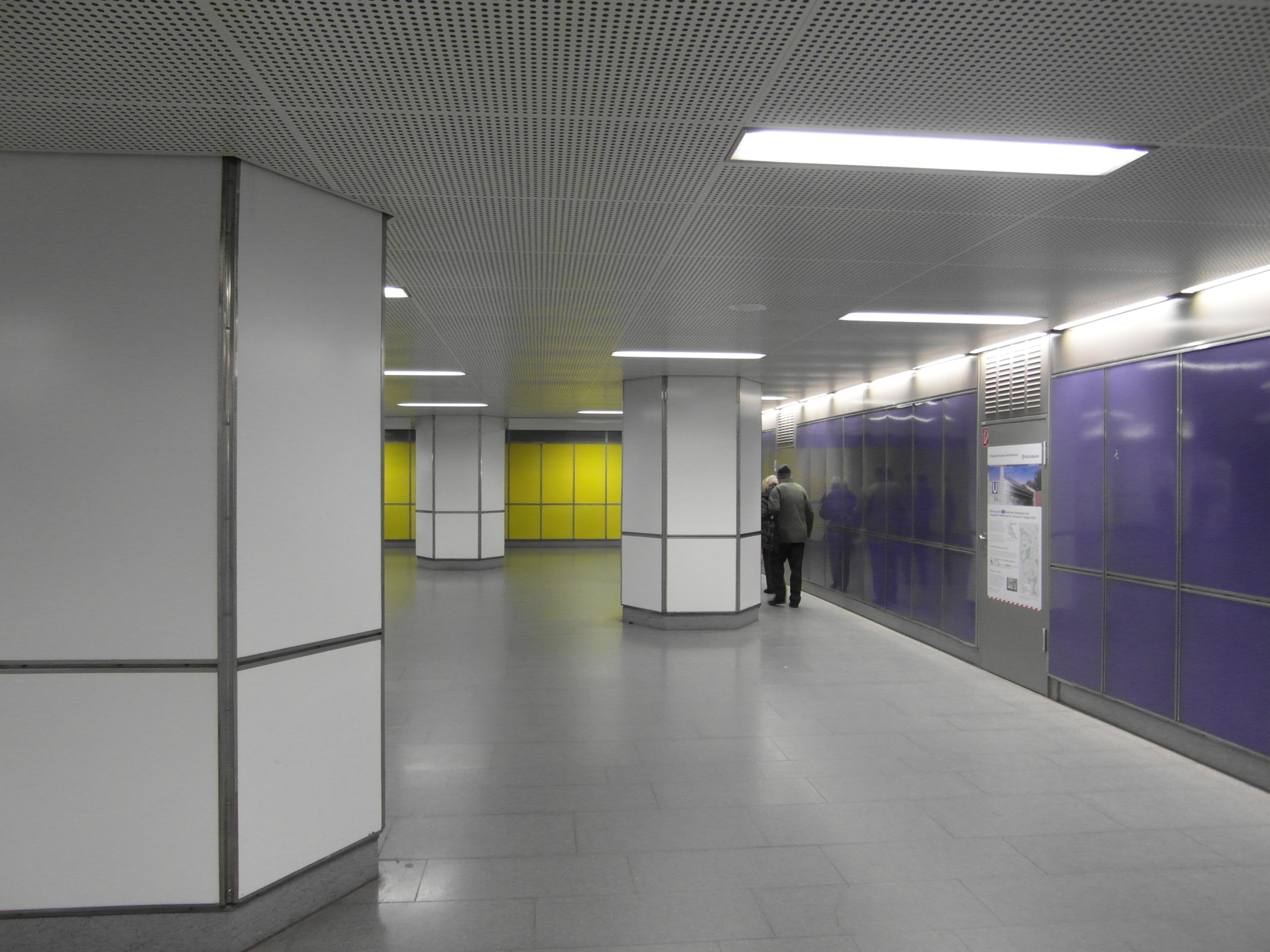
U2/U4 mezzanine

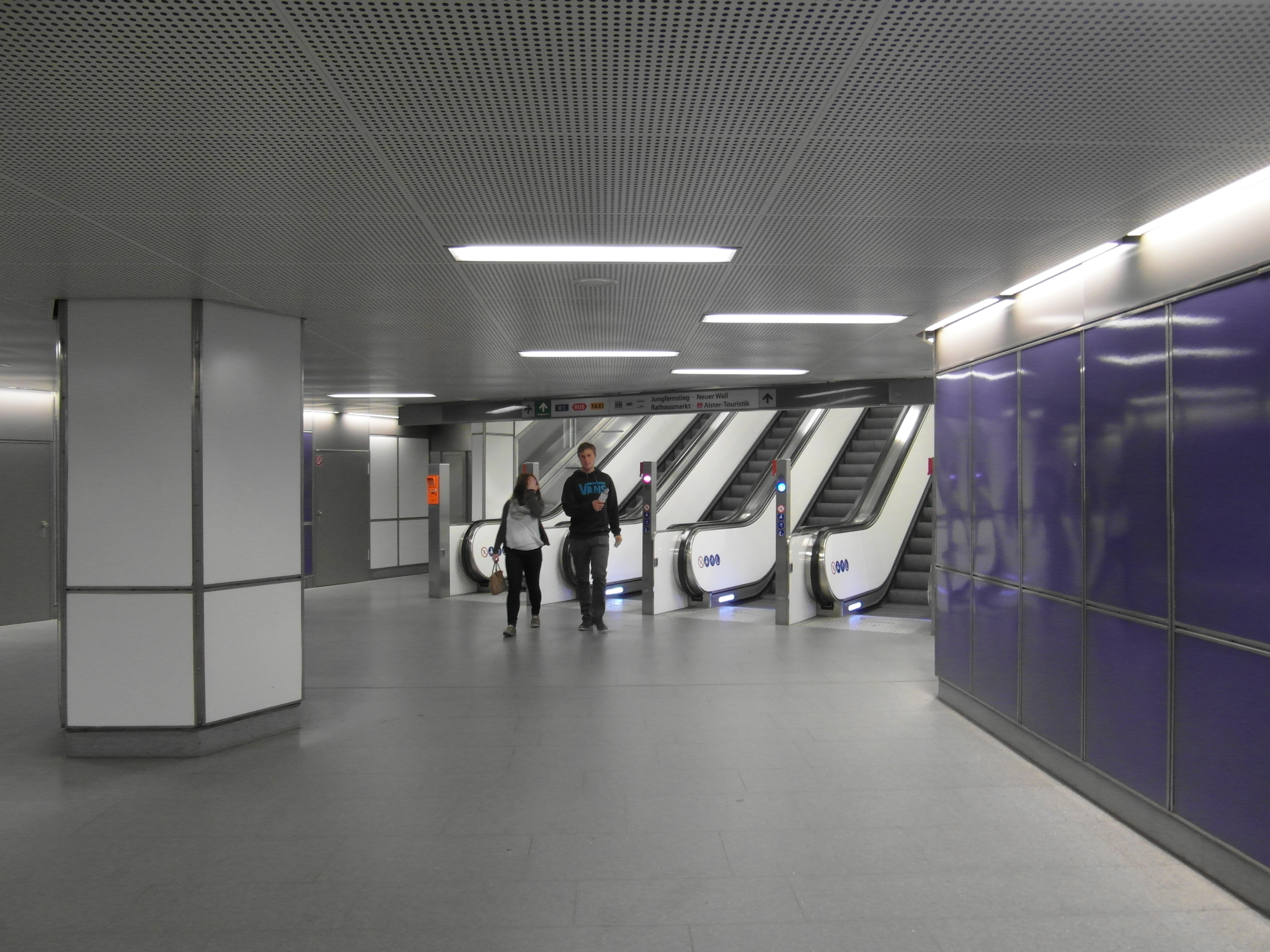
U2/U4 mezzanine

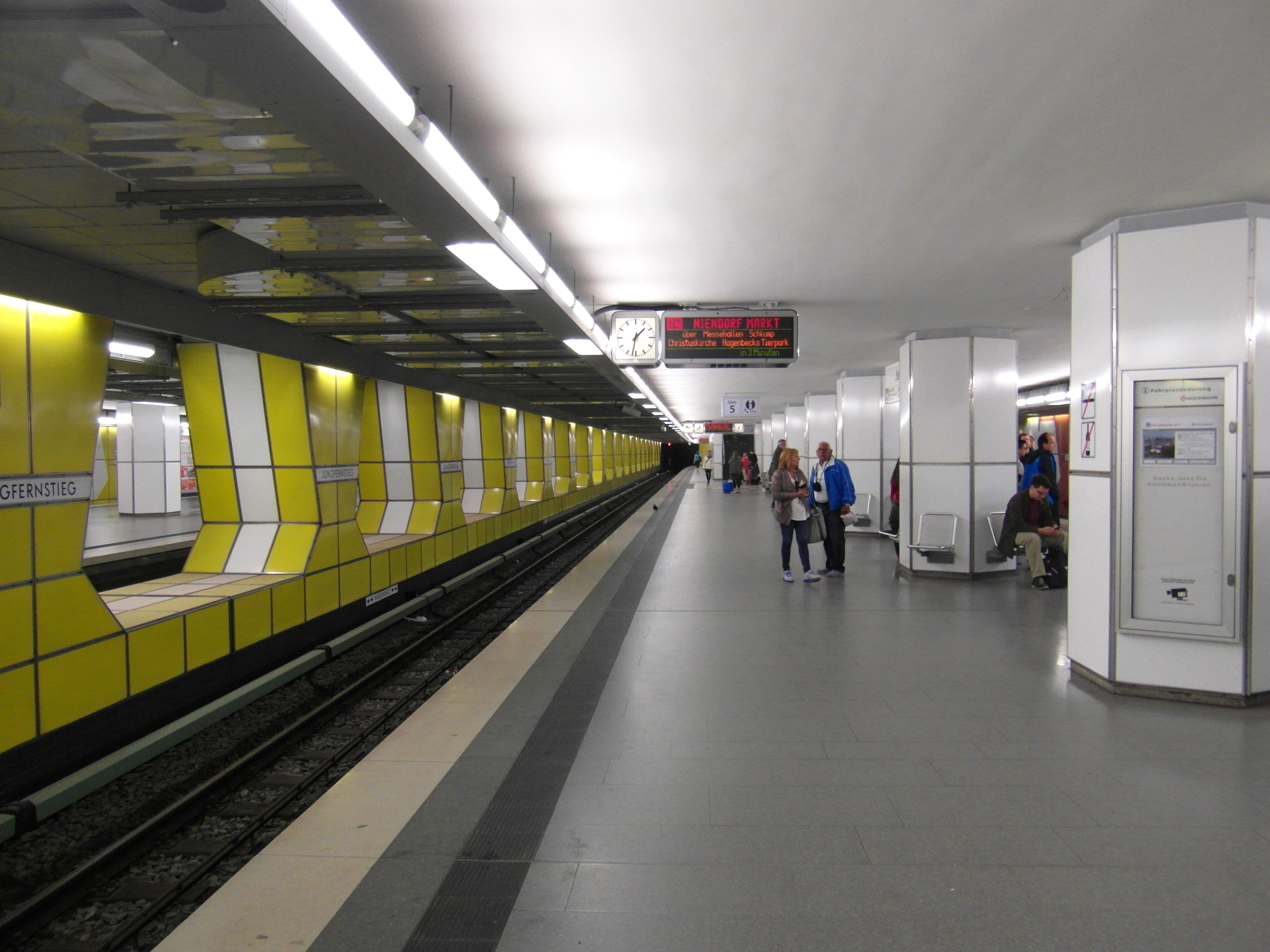
U2/U4 platform

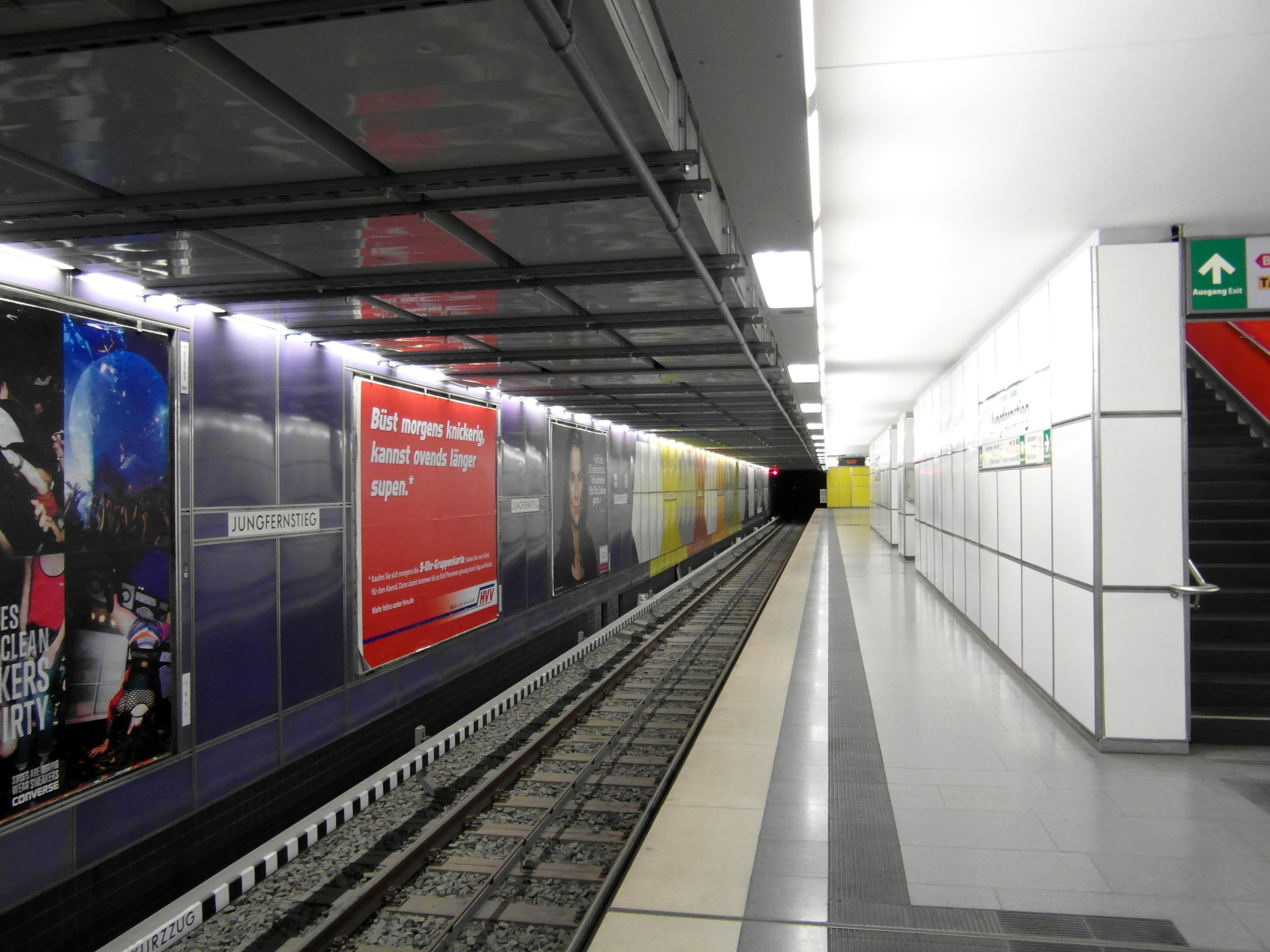
U2/U4 platform

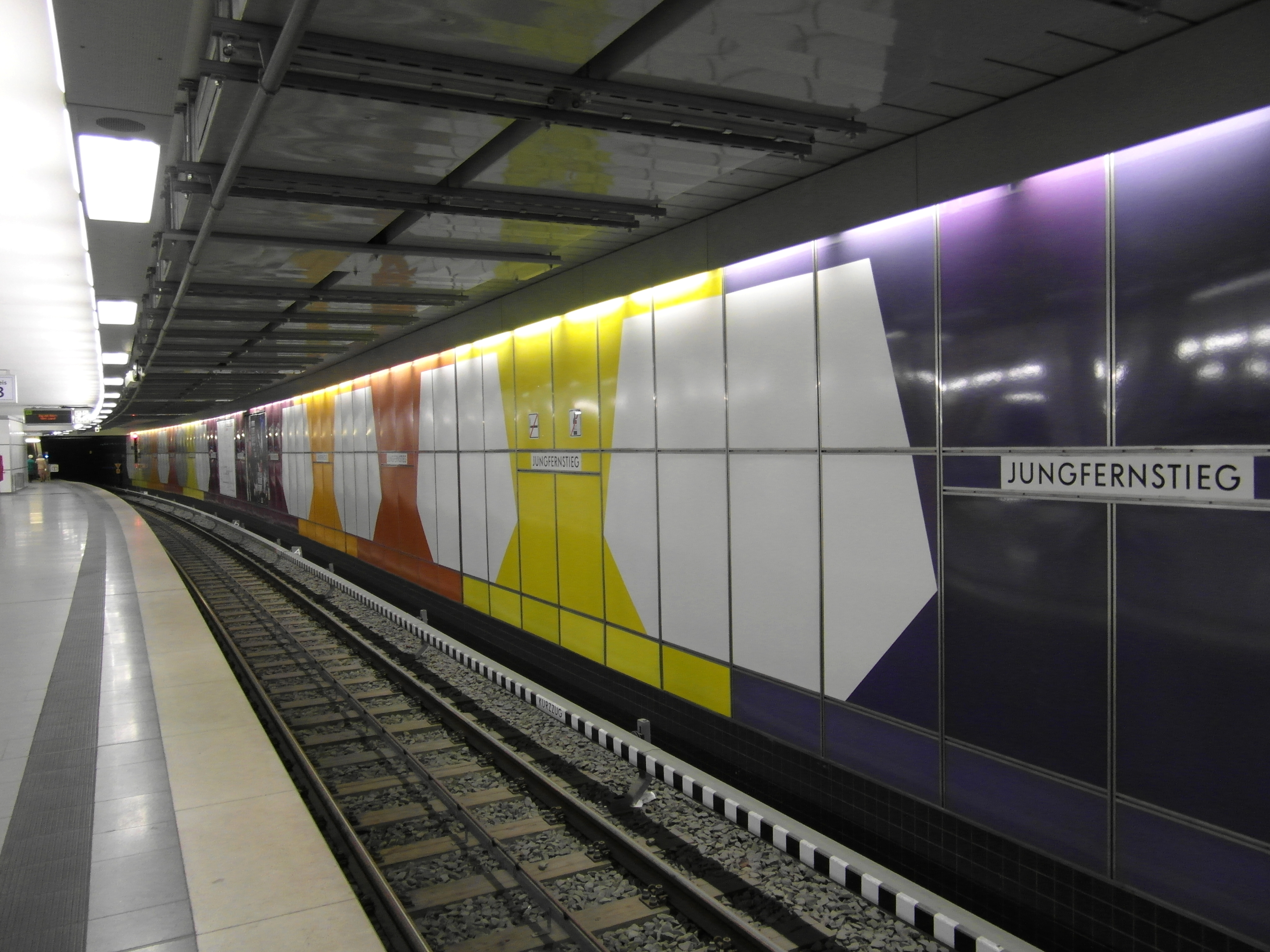
U2/U4 platform
Note: all photos from 2013

== Service ==
HVV runs one staffed service centre at Jungfernstieg, along a number of sales points and ticket machines throughout the station. There are also toilets, baby-care rooms, shops and restaurants. Hamburger Hochbahn-Wache has a staffed guard office at Jungfernstieg, along the obligatory CCTV cameras and SOS/information telephones.

=== Trains ===
The lines S1 and S3 of Hamburg S-Bahn and the lines U1, U2 and U4 of Hamburg U-Bahn call at Jungfernstieg station.

=== Bus ===
Among others, HHA metro bus lines 4, 5, and 19 as well as VHH express bus line X3 call at bus stops on the streets above the station.

=== Ferry ===
Jungfernstieg is the central landing pier for Hamburg's Alster ferries; though no longer within the HVV, the ferries are popular as pleasure boats.

== See also ==
- List of Hamburg U-Bahn stations
- List of Hamburg S-Bahn stations
