= Reeperbahn station =

Railway station in Hamburg, Germany

Reeperbahn
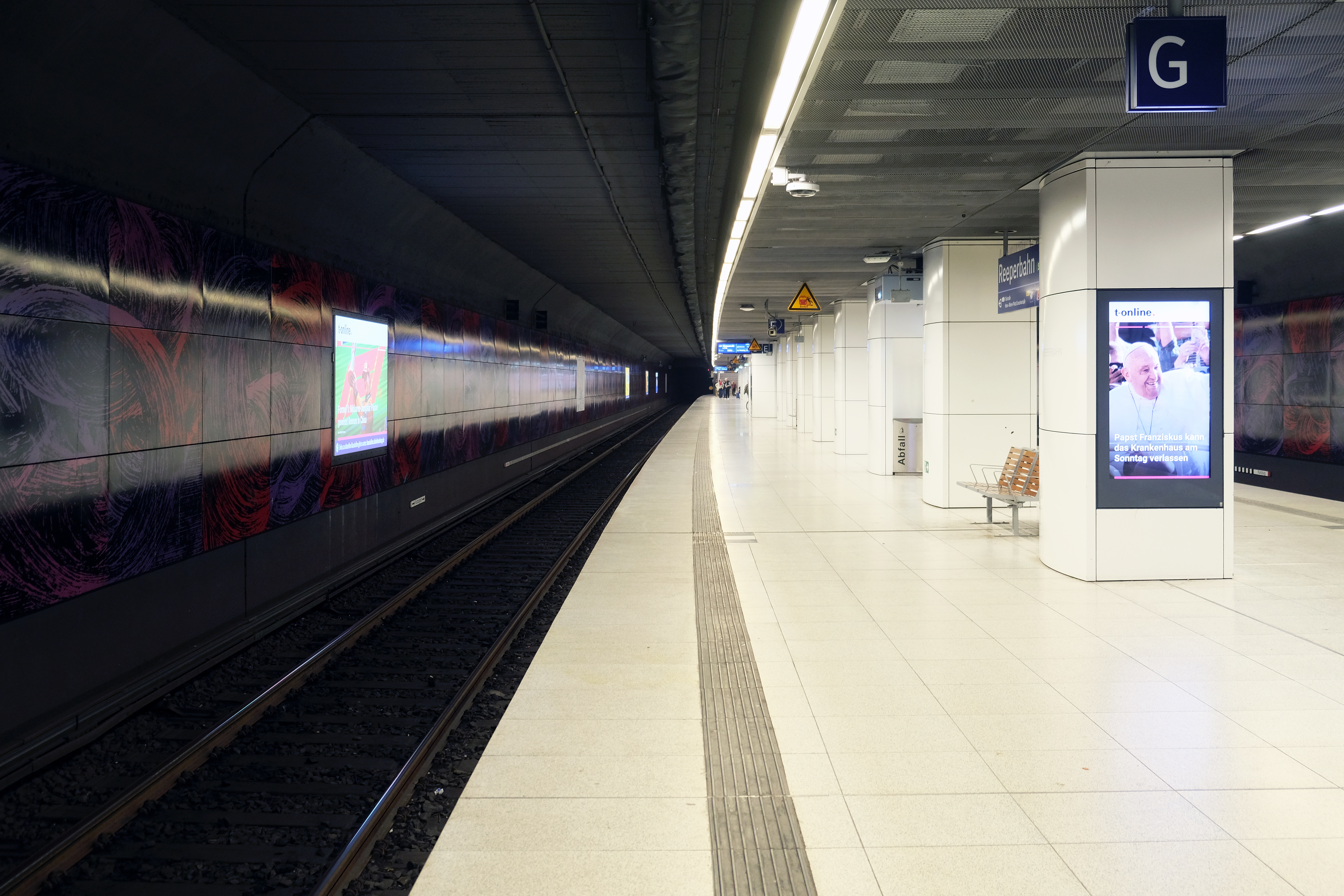
- Reeperbahn station

General information
- Location: Reeperbahn; 20359 Hamburg, Germany
- Coordinates: 53°32′58″N 9°57′21″E
- Owner: Hamburger Hochbahn
- Platforms: 1 island platform
- Tracks: 2 side tracks

Construction
- Structure type: Underground
- Platform levels: 2
- Accessible: No

Other information
- Station code: S-Bahn: ds100: ARES; DB station code: 5167; Type: Hp; Category: 4
- Fare zone: HVV: A/101

History
- Opened: 19 April 1979; 47 years ago
- Electrified: at opening

Services
Preceding station	Hamburg S-Bahn	Following station
Königstraße towards Wedel	S1	Landungsbrücken towards Poppenbüttel or Hamburg Airport
Königstraße towards Pinneberg	S3	Landungsbrücken towards Hamburg-Neugraben
Location
- Location within Hamburg Location within Schleswig-Holstein Location within Germany Location within Europe

Reeperbahn is a Hamburg S-Bahn station in St. Pauli, Hamburg, Germany, located at the eastern end of the Reeperbahn. Reeperbahn station is part of the City S-Bahn tunnel from Hamburg main station in St. Georg to Hamburg-Altona station in Altona, and opened on 21 April 1979.

== Station layout ==
The underground station consists of two levels with a mezzanine and a station level with one island platform, two tracks and two exits. At the exit Nobistor is a bus stop and a taxicab stand. The station can also be used as an air-raid shelter. The station is not accessible for handicapped persons, because there is no lift.

== Service ==
On track 1 the trains in destination Wedel and Pinneberg and on track 2 the trains in destination Neugraben and Poppenbüttel are calling Reeperbahn in the rush hours every 2 to 3 minutes.
