= Gänsemarkt station =

Railway station in Hamburg, Germany

Gänsemarkt (Oper)
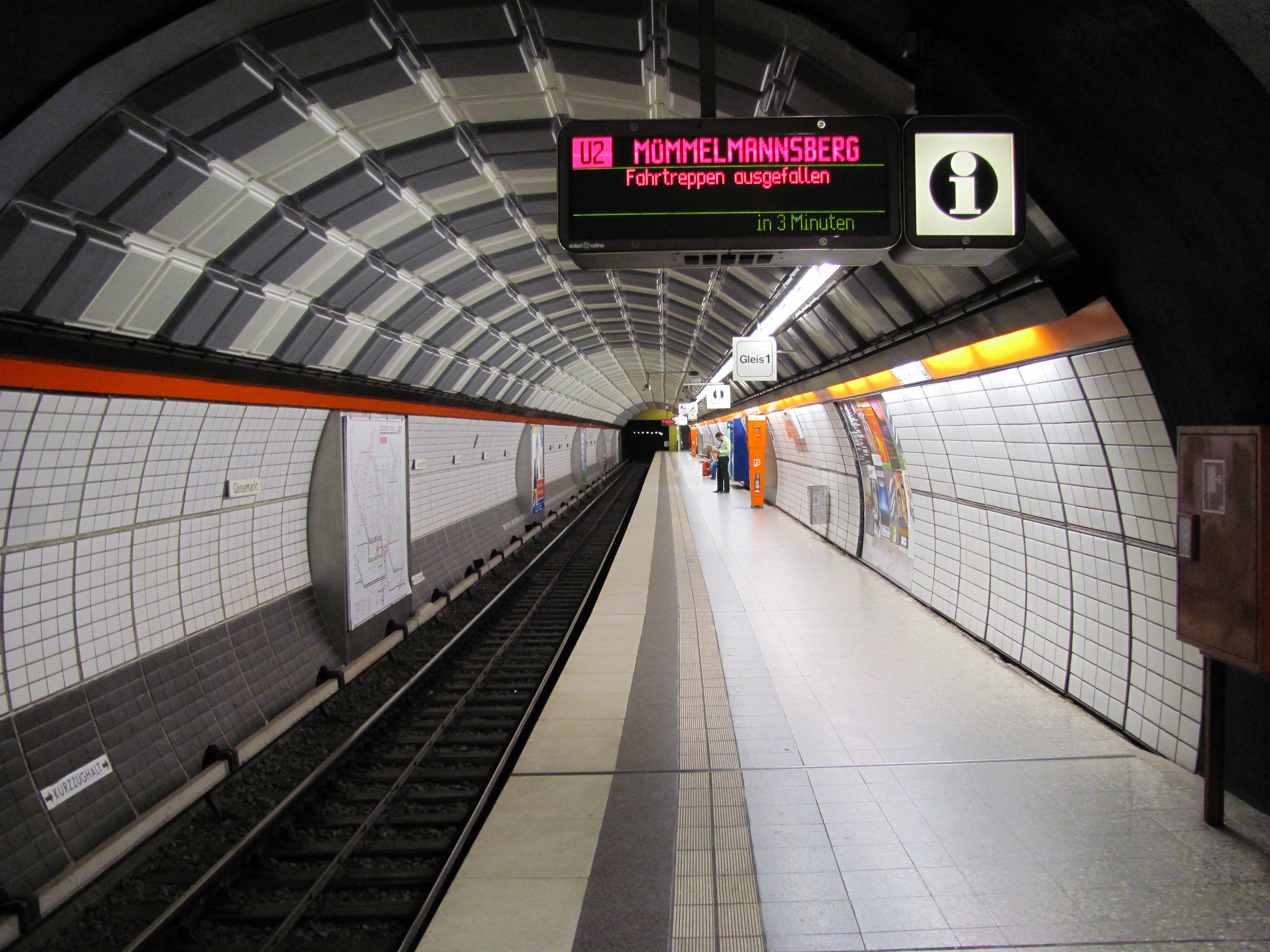

General information
- Location: Gänsemarkt; 20354 Hamburg, Germany
- Coordinates: 53°33′20″N 09°59′13″E
- System: Hamburg U-Bahn station
- Operator: Hamburger Hochbahn AG
- Line: U2
- Platforms: 2 side platforms
- Tracks: 2
- Connections: Bus, Taxi

Construction
- Structure type: Underground
- Accessible: Yes

Other information
- Station code: GM
- Fare zone: HVV: A/000

History
- Opened: 31 May 1970

Services
Preceding station	Hamburg U-Bahn	Following station
Messehallen towards Niendorf Nord	U2	Jungfernstieg towards Mümmelmannsberg
Location
- Location within Hamburg Location within Germany

Gänsemarkt is a metro station on the Hamburg U-Bahn line U2. The underground station is located at Gänsemarkt square in the Neustadt of Hamburg, Germany. The station is also known as Gänsemarkt (Oper), named by the nearby Hamburg Opera (Oper) on Dammtorstraße.

== Service ==
=== Trains ===
Gänsemarkt U-Bahn station is served by Hamburg U-Bahn line U2; departures are every 5 minutes.

== Gallery ==
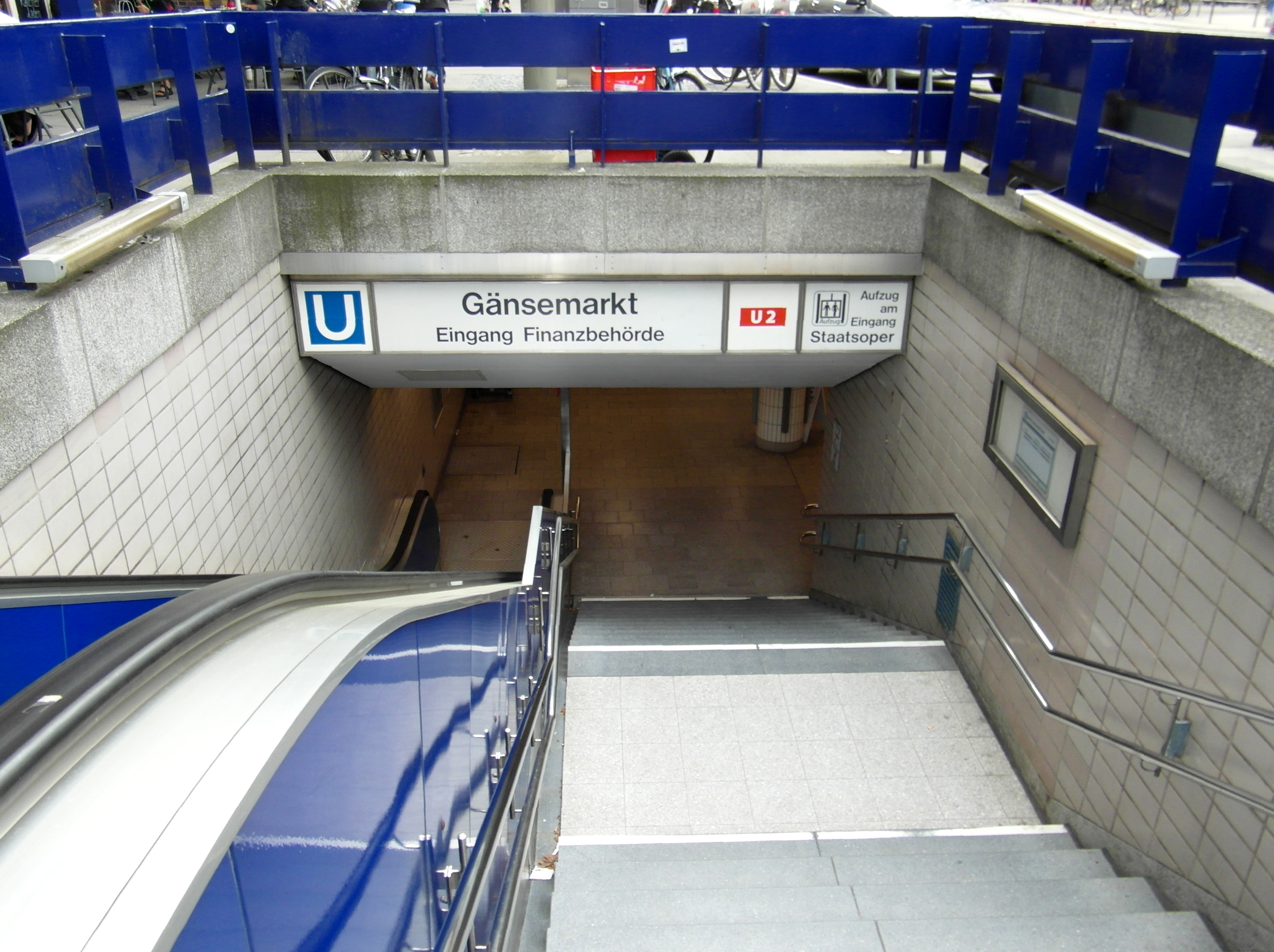
One of the station's entrances

== See also ==
- List of Hamburg U-Bahn stations
