= Hamburg City S-Bahn =

City-S-Bahn

Overview
- Line number: 1270
- Locale: Hamburg, Germany

Service
- Route number: 101.1, 101.2, 101.3

Technical
- Line length: 5.38 km (3.34 mi)
- Track gauge: 1,435 mm (4 ft 8 1/2 in) standard gauge
- Electrification: 1200 V DC third rail
- Operating speed: 60 km/h (37 mph) (max)
- Maximum incline: 0.4%

The City S-Bahn is a 5,380 metre-long tunnel section of the Hamburg S-Bahn. It runs between Altona station and Hamburg Hauptbahnhof through the city centre of Hamburg and the districts of Altona and St. Pauli. The S-Bahn lines S1 and S3 of the Hamburger Verkehrsverbund (Hamburg Transport Association) run through the tunnel. Seven S-Bahn stations are located in the tunnel, including the tourist-oriented stations of Landungsbrücken and Reeperbahn.

== Route ==
The tunnel begins directly after the Hauptbahnhof where its two tracks branch off the Hamburg-Altona link line and immediately dive under it. The ramp has a maximum gradient of 3.94%, since only a few hundred metres from the beginning of the tunnel it begins to run under the Inner Alster Lake to Jungfernstieg station, which is built under the lake. The line runs from there to the southwest, passing through Stadthausbrücke station to Landungsbrücken station. From there, it swings back to the northwest and tunnels under the Reeperbahn to Reeperbahn station. It then continues to Königstrasse station and reaches Altona station from the south. The underground S-Bahn station at Altona was built with four tracks, including a reversing facility. Shortly north of the station, the railway climbs at a maximum gradient of 4.0% to reach ground level.

== History ==
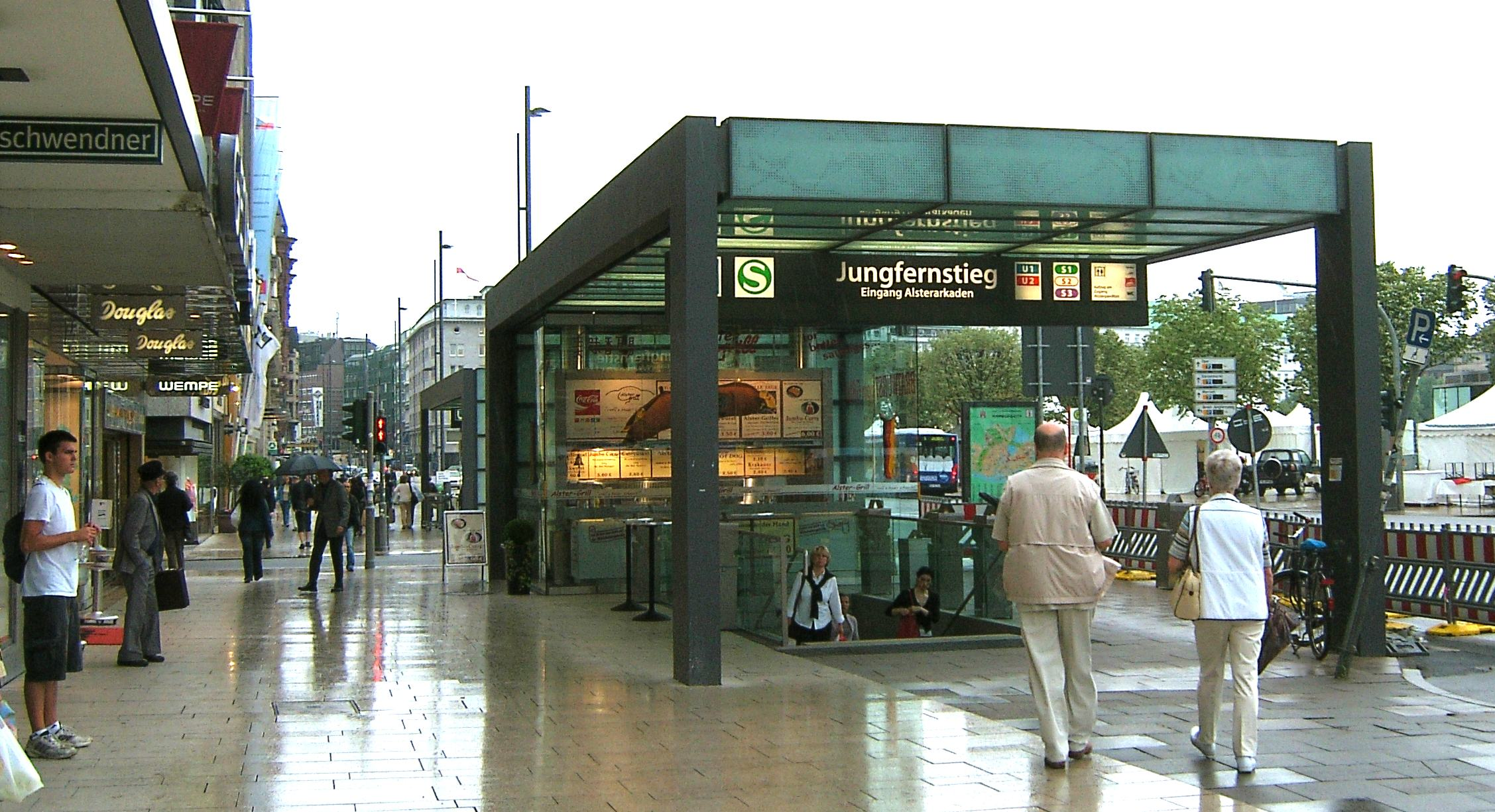
Entrance to Jungfernstieg station

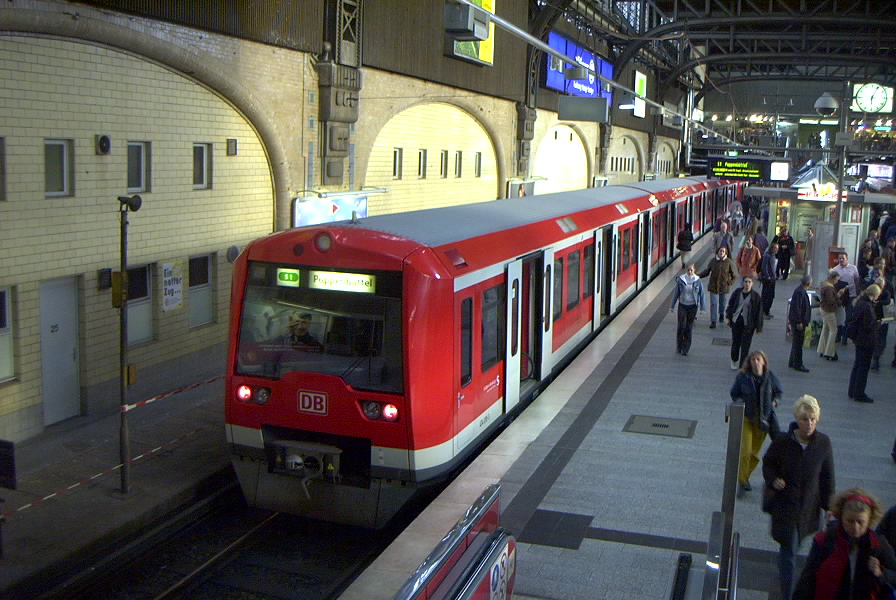
A class 474 train on track 3 in the main hall of Hamburg Hauptbahnhof

In the 1960s, Hamburg had only two S-Bahn lines. During the planning and construction of the large housing estate of Osdorfer Born in north-western Hamburg, consideration was given to increasing S-Bahn services on the Hamburg-Altona link line (Verbindungsbahn), which at that time had services running at a minimum interval of 150 seconds. The signalling system allowed trains to run 90 seconds apart but the slightest deviation from the timetable would have created a major difficulty. Moreover, the link line avoided the entire central city of Hamburg and the former city of Altona, as it ran along part of the former Hamburg ramparts. As a result, it was decided to build an underground S-Bahn line to the south of the Link line to open up the inner city—the City S-Bahn line.

Construction, which was planned to take14 years, started on 14 October 1967. Building the line proved to be extremely difficult, since in addition to passing under the Inner Alster Lake, the line was almost completely in tunnel and does not always run under existing roads, instead cutting across some blocks. A particular challenge to the engineers was the Jungfernstieg station, where the line intersects with the U-Bahn line U1, which was built in the 1930s. Two platforms were completed in 1973 for the new U2 Diameter line (Durchmesserstrecke) of the Hamburg U-Bahn below the route of the City-S-Bahn line. Therefore, the infrastructure of the S-train station had to be built between the two levels of the U-Bahn tunnels. Despite these difficulties, the Hauptbahnhof–Landungsbrücken section was opened on 1 June 1975. It was operated as interim S-Bahn line S10.

Besides the actual line, the two end points of the line at Hauptbahnhof and Altona station also had to be upgraded. Before the construction of the City S-Bahn the existing Altona station was a terminus with ten tracks, two reserved for the S-Bahn. First, the S-Bahn facilities were demolished and an underground station was built. Subsequently the rest of the station building was demolished because the risk of its collapse due to the driving of the tunnel under it was considered to be unacceptable. The new station and the last remaining tunnel sections between Landungsbrücken and Altona became operational on 19 April 1979.

During the construction of the tunnel it was decided to extend the S-Bahn to Harburg, requiring increased capacity at the Hauptbahnhof. A two-track underground station was built next to the main hall of the Hauptbahnhof for S-Bahn trains running towards Altona, one track to the City S-Bahn line and one track to the Link line. The two S-Bahn tracks in the Hauptbahnhof’s main hall were rearranged for trains running from Altona. These arrangements facilitated transfer of passengers between S-Bahn services on the Link line and City S-Bahn line. The new underground S-Bahn platform was completed in 1981.

== Future ==
Following the example of Munich's Trunk line 2, a second city tunnel is planned for Hamburg; linking the Hauptbahnhof with a new station in Altona-Nord at a cost of €3 billion. Intermediate stations would be located at Dammtor, Schlump and Doormannsweg.
