= Königstraße station =

Railway station in Germany

Königstraße
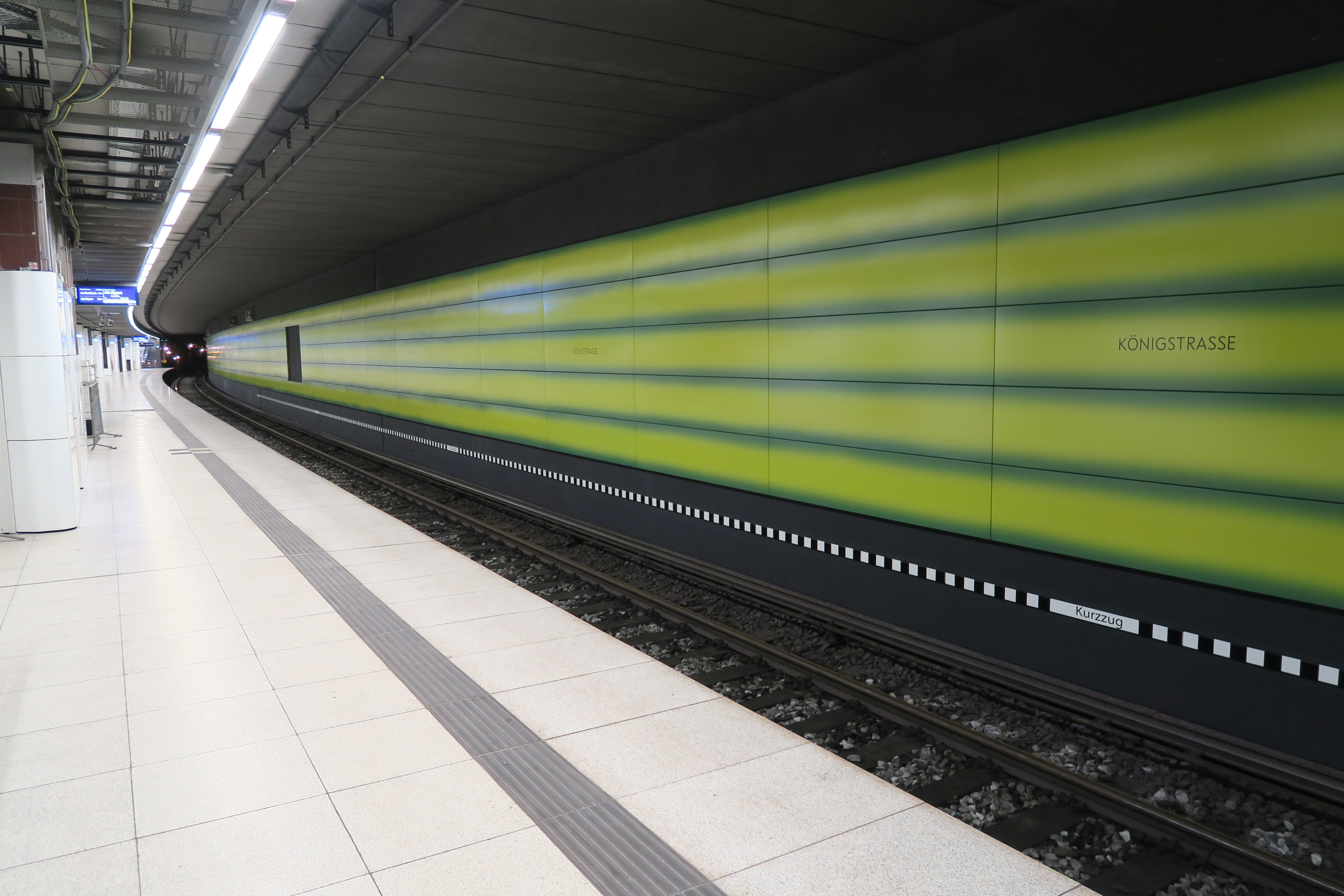

General information
- Location: Königstraße 20; 22767 Hamburg, Germany
- Coordinates: 53°32′54″N 09°56′44″E
- Operator: S-Bahn Hamburg GmbH
- Line: S1 S3
- Platforms: 1 island platform
- Tracks: 2
- Connections: Bus

Construction
- Structure type: Underground
- Accessible: No

Other information
- Station code: ds100: AKS, DB: 3357; Type: Hp, Category: 4
- Fare zone: HVV: A/101

History
- Opened: 19 April 1979; 47 years ago
- Electrified: at opening

Services
Preceding station	Hamburg S-Bahn	Following station
Hamburg-Altona towards Wedel	S1	Reeperbahn towards Poppenbüttel or Hamburg Airport
Hamburg-Altona towards Pinneberg	S3	Reeperbahn towards Hamburg-Neugraben
Location
- Location within Hamburg Location within Schleswig-Holstein Location within Germany Location within Europe

Königstraße is a railway station served by the rapid transit trains of Hamburg S-Bahn lines S1 and S3. The station is located on the underground City S-Bahn line in Altona's Old Town quarter in the Hamburg borough of Altona, Germany. Like all Hamburg S-Bahn stations, Königstraße station is managed by the DB InfraGO AG.

Königstraße is located on and named after one of Altona's major roads, between Reeperbahn and Palmaille. The station was opened on 21 April 1979.

== Station layout ==
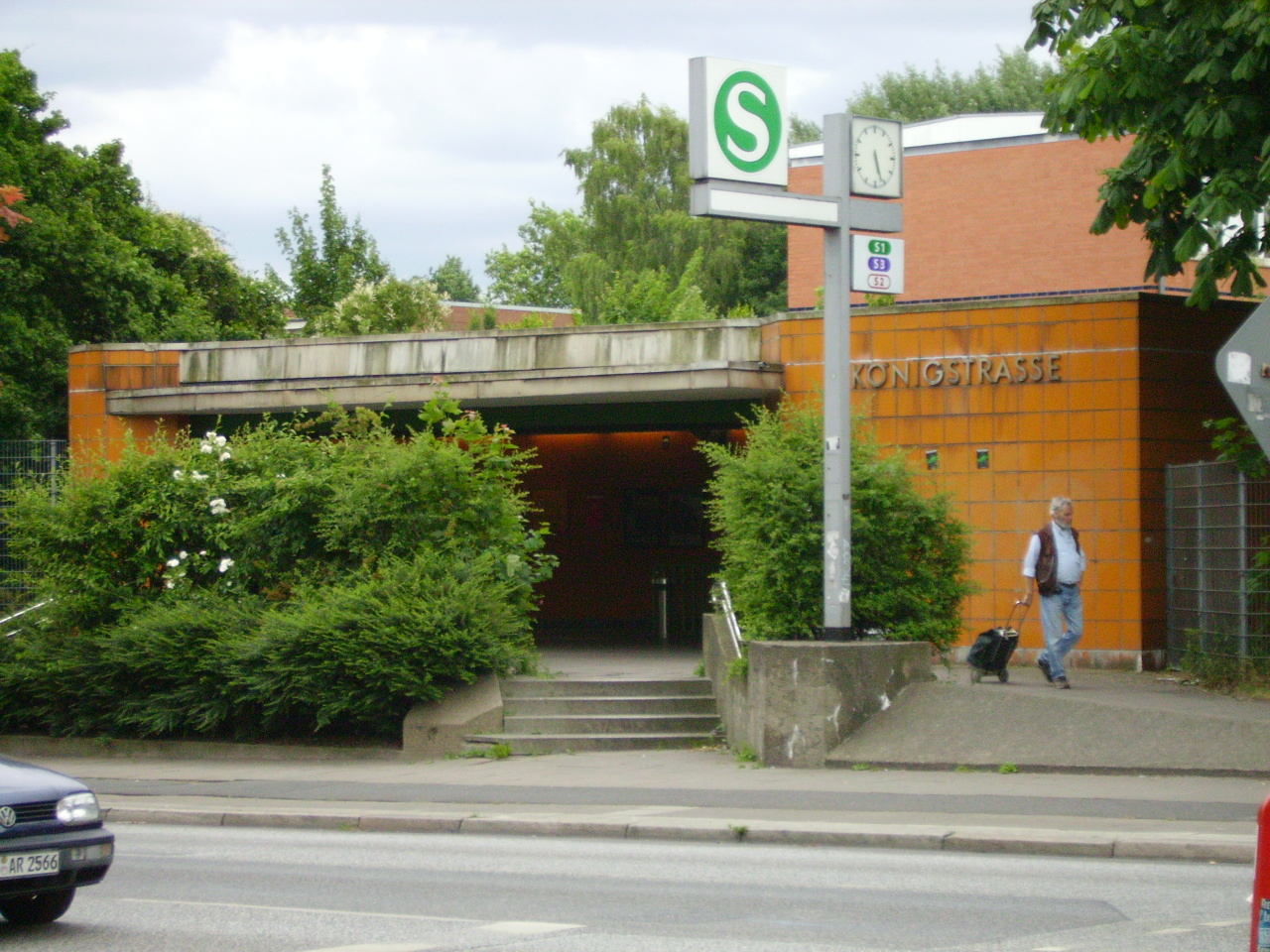
The station's entrance

Königstraße station consists of an underground island platform with two tracks, two mezzanines and two exits. The station is not accessible for handicapped people, because there is no lift and no special floor layout for blind people.

== Station services ==
=== Trains ===
The rapid transit trains of the lines S1 and S3 of the Hamburg S-Bahn call at the station. Direction of the trains on track 1 is Wedel (S1) and Pinneberg (S3). On track 2 the trains are traveling in the direction Poppenbüttel and Neugraben (S3) via Hamburg Hauptbahnhof.

=== Facilities ===
The station is unstaffed but there are SOS and information telephones, and ticket machines. There are no parking places, no bicycle stands, and no toilets.

== See also ==
- Hamburger Verkehrsverbund (HVV)
- List of Hamburg S-Bahn stations
