= Landungsbrücken station =

Railway station in Hamburg, Germany

Landungsbrücken
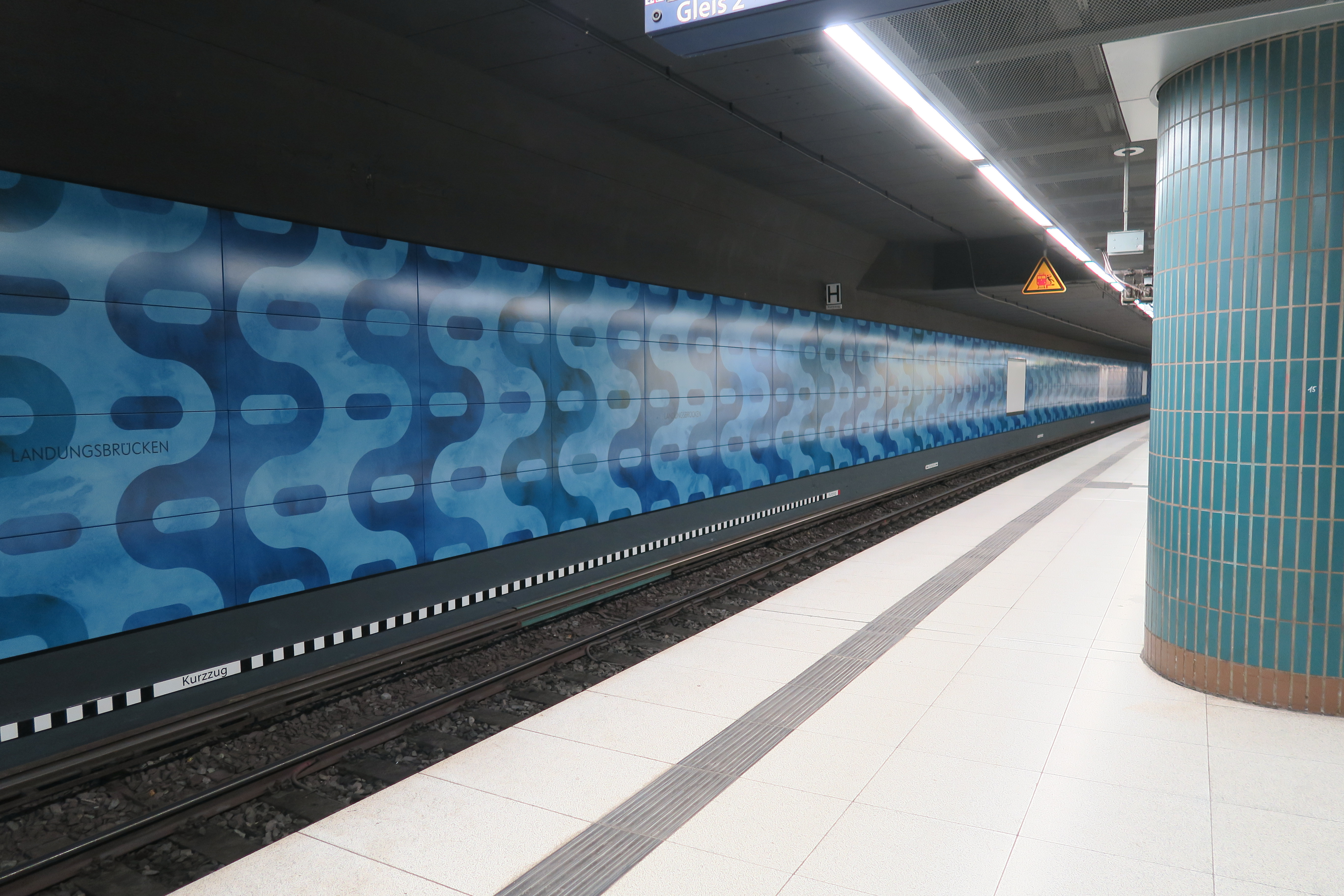

General information
- Location: Helgoländer Allee; 20459 Hamburg, Germany
- Coordinates: 53°32′46″N 9°58′00″E
- Owner: Hamburger Hochbahn AG; S-Bahn Hamburg
- Lines: S1 S3 U3
- Platforms: 1 island platform, 2 side platforms
- Tracks: 4
- Connections: Bus, Taxi, Ferry

Construction
- Structure type: Elevated (U-Bahn); Underground (S-Bahn)
- Platform levels: 2
- Accessible: Yes

Other information
- Station code: S-Bahn: ds100: ALAS, DB: 3517; Type: Hp, Category: 4
- Fare zone: HVV: A/000, 101, and 108

History
- Opened: U-Bahn: 29 June 1912; S-Bahn: 1 June 1975
- Former names: Hafentor (until 1920)

Services
Preceding station	Hamburg S-Bahn	Following station
Reeperbahn towards Wedel	S1	Stadthausbrücke towards Poppenbüttel or Hamburg Airport
Reeperbahn towards Pinneberg	S3	Stadthausbrücke towards Hamburg-Neugraben
Preceding station	Hamburg U-Bahn	Following station
St. Pauli towards Barmbek	U3	Baumwall towards Wandsbek-Gartenstadt
Location
- Location within Hamburg Location within Schleswig-Holstein Location within Germany Location within Europe

Landungsbrücken is a railway station and transport hub, located in Hamburg's St. Pauli quarter at the Landungsbrücken. It is part of the City S-Bahn line and the Hamburg U-Bahn.

== History ==
=== U-Bahn station ===
The first U-Bahn line in Hamburg was begun in 1906 by the Hamburger Hochbahn. It forms a ring around the inner city. A station was also built near the Landungsbrücken in the slope of the Stintfang hill with 26m NN, nearby Bismarck Monument, designed 1906 by the architects, Johann Emil Schaudt and Walter Puritz. The station, which is called Landungsbrücken today, was built semi-open, which means that the western end is roofed with a concrete slab and the eastern end is left open. The station with the name of Hafentor (Harbor gate), together with the stretch Millerntor - Rathaus (today St. Pauli - Rathaus), finally went into operation on 29 June 1912. The striking tower at the entrance and the elevated railway stop, designed by Emil Schaudt, were torn down during construction of the City-S-Bahn. The new entrance with a copper roof (designed by Hans L. M. Loop and Fritz Trautwein) is connected to the ferry piers by a pedestrian bridge. The eastern entrance was designed by Walter Puritz and was built in the 1920s.

=== S-Bahn station ===
The Landungsbrücken station of the S-Bahn has existed since 1975. Since 1979 it is part of the city line tunnel from the Main station to Altona station. A burned S-Bahn train in the station on 30 September 1984, required the station to be completely renovated.

== Layout ==
The main entrance to the station has an escalator and is inside the U-Bahn station building. There is a minor entrance at Eichholz, a side street in the East.

== Services ==
Landungsbrücken is served by the S1 and S3 lines of the Hamburg S-Bahn and by the U3 of the Hamburg U-Bahn.

== Gallery ==
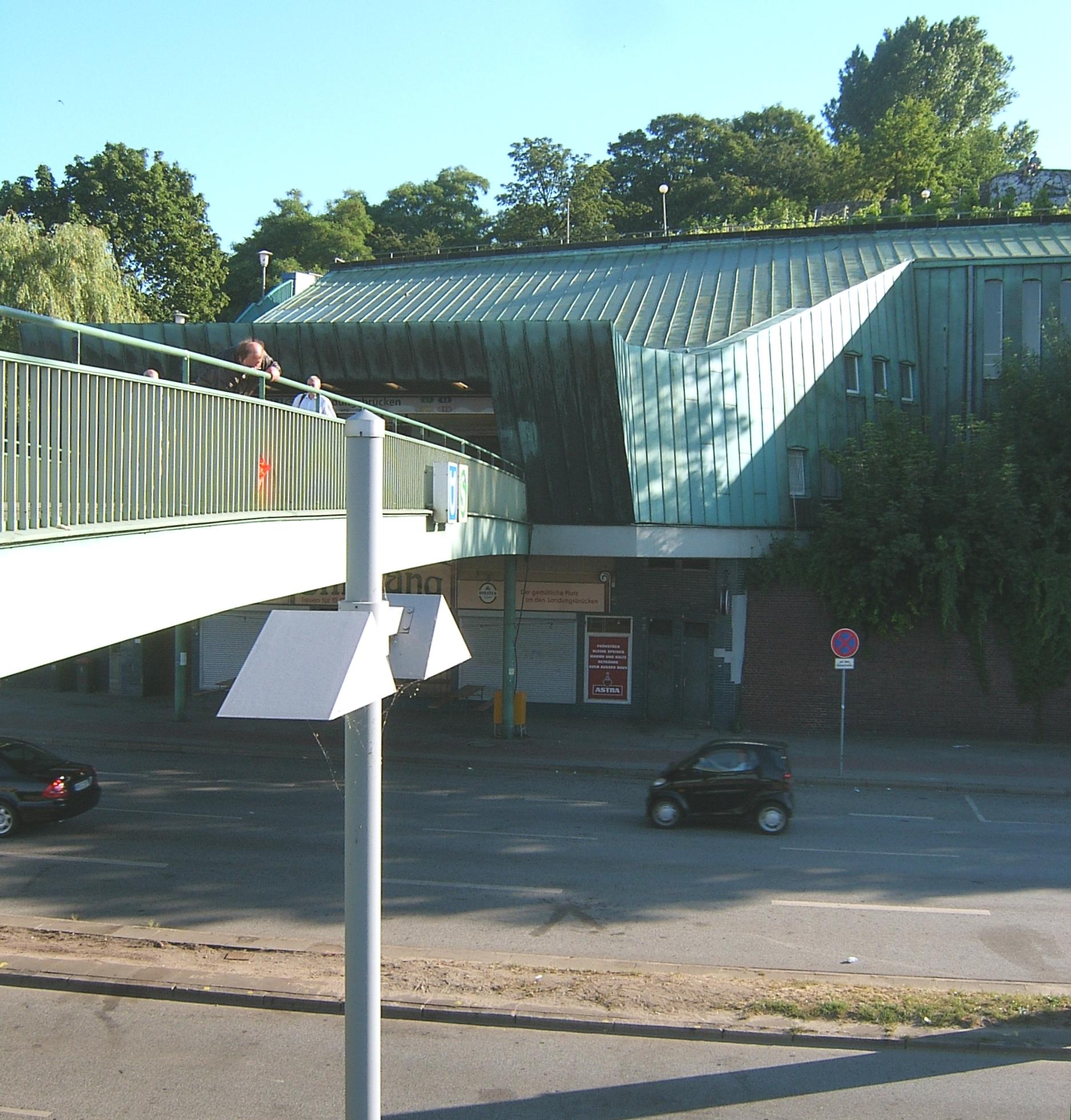
The station's entrance

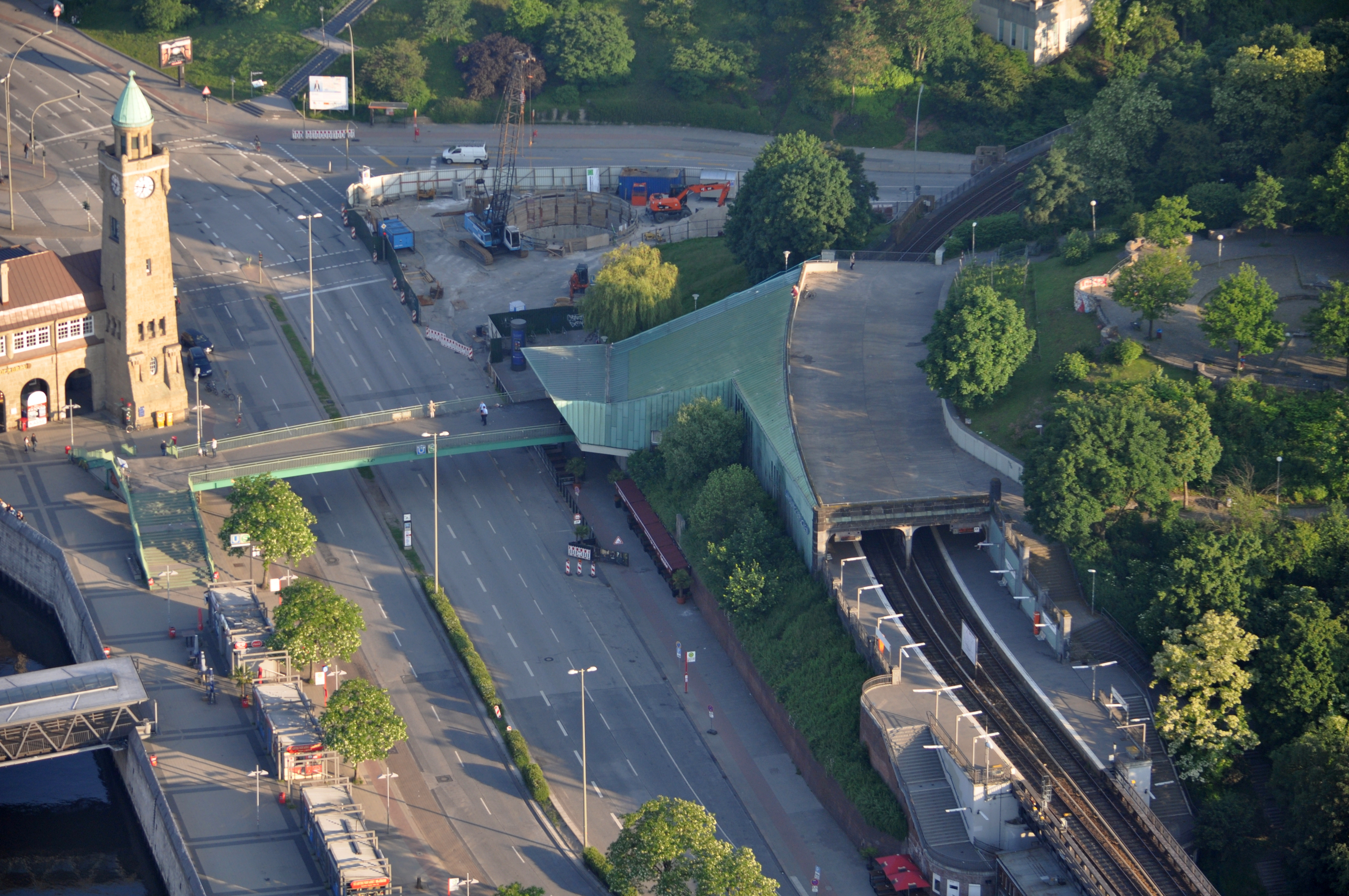
Aerial view of the station (right) and the tower of St. Pauli Piers (left)

== See also ==
- List of Hamburg U-Bahn stations
- List of Hamburg S-Bahn stations
