= Neuer Wall =

Shopping street in Hamburg, Germany

Coordinates: 53°33′2″N 9°59′16″E

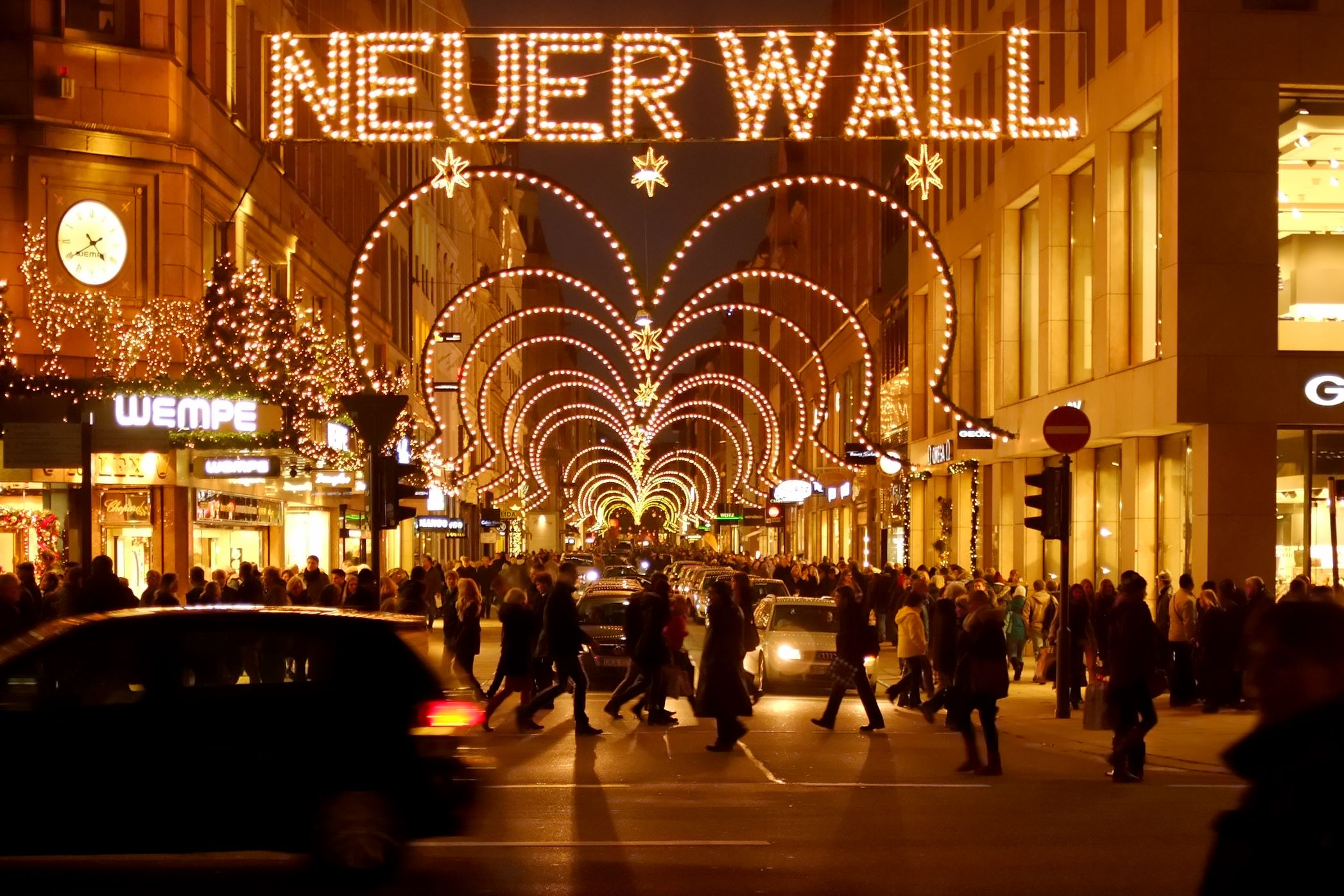
Neuer Wall during Christmas season, seen from Jungfernstieg

Neuer Wall (German pronunciation: [nɔʏɛʀ val]) is an upmarket shopping street in Hamburg, Germany.

The 1,200 m of shop-fronts are almost entirely lined with luxury brands. According to international real estate and retail reports, Neuer Wall is among the most exclusive shopping streets in Europe.

It is located in Neustadt, amidst a busy shopping district. It is some 600 m long and stretches from Jungfernstieg on Lake Binnenalster, to Stadthausbrücke on its southern end. Left and right, the buildings' back sides are flanked by Bleichenfleet and the Alster River (here as Kleine Alster and Alsterfleet). Vis-à-vis the 1710 built Görtz-Palais, it has a small square. At the 1864 built Mellin-Passage, it has an interconnecting mall to Alsterarkaden. The street's course is crossed by Poststraße and Bleichenbrücke.

== Gallery ==
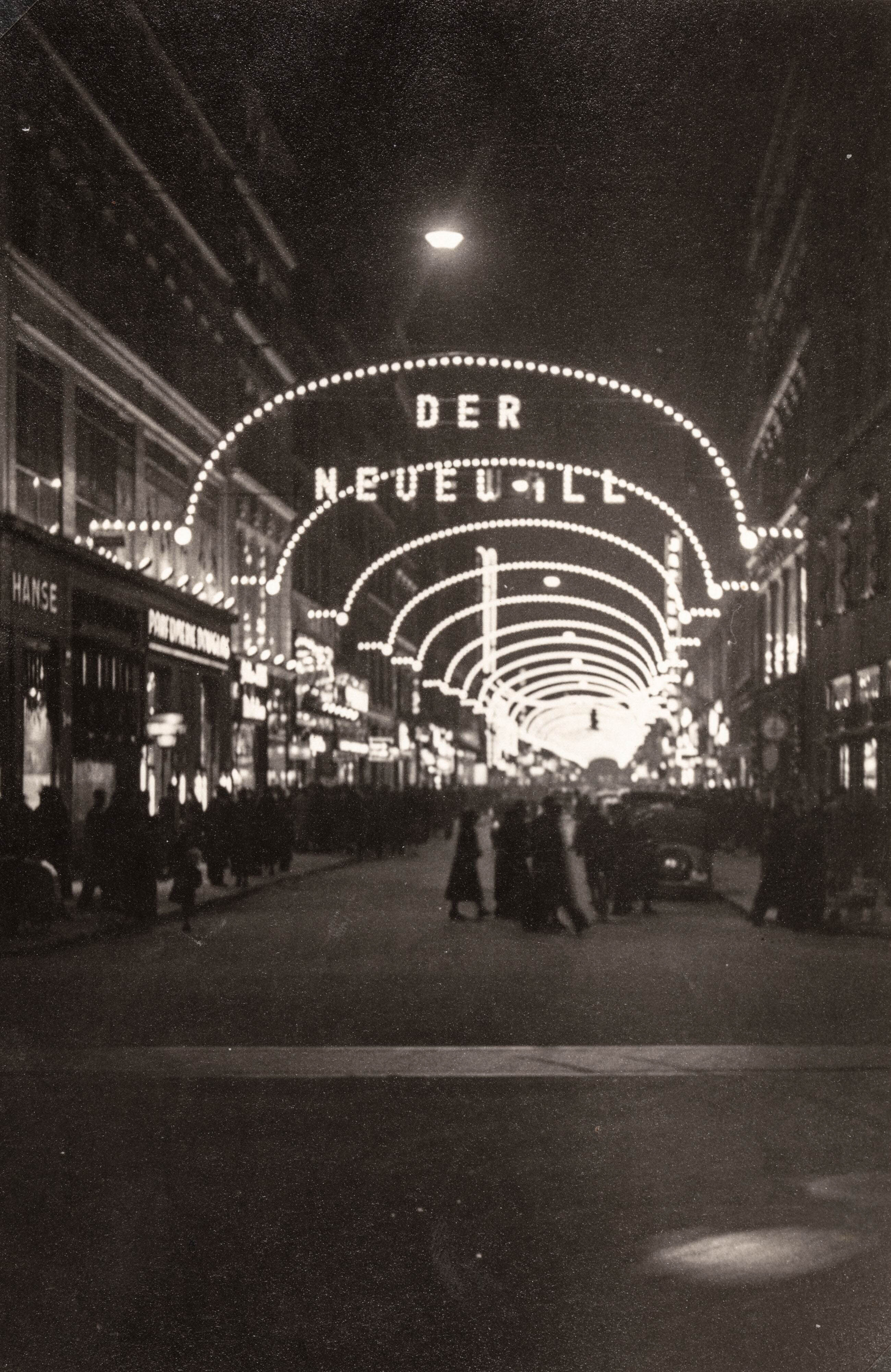
Neue Wall in 1938

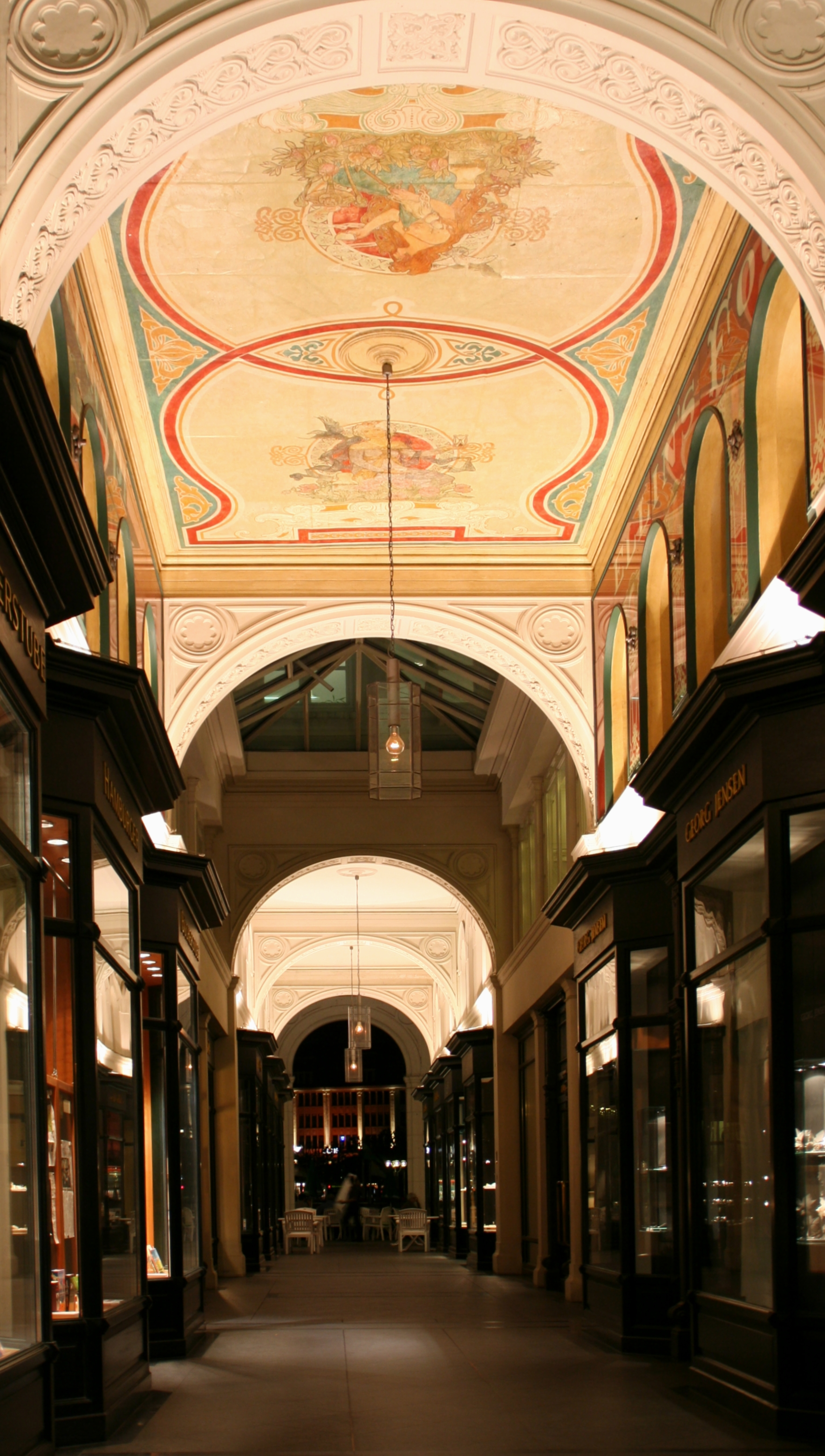
Mellin-Passage

== See also ==
- List of leading shopping streets and districts by city
- Große Bleichen (parallel shopping street)
