= Hamburg-Altona station =

Railway station in Hamburg, Germany

Hamburg-Altona
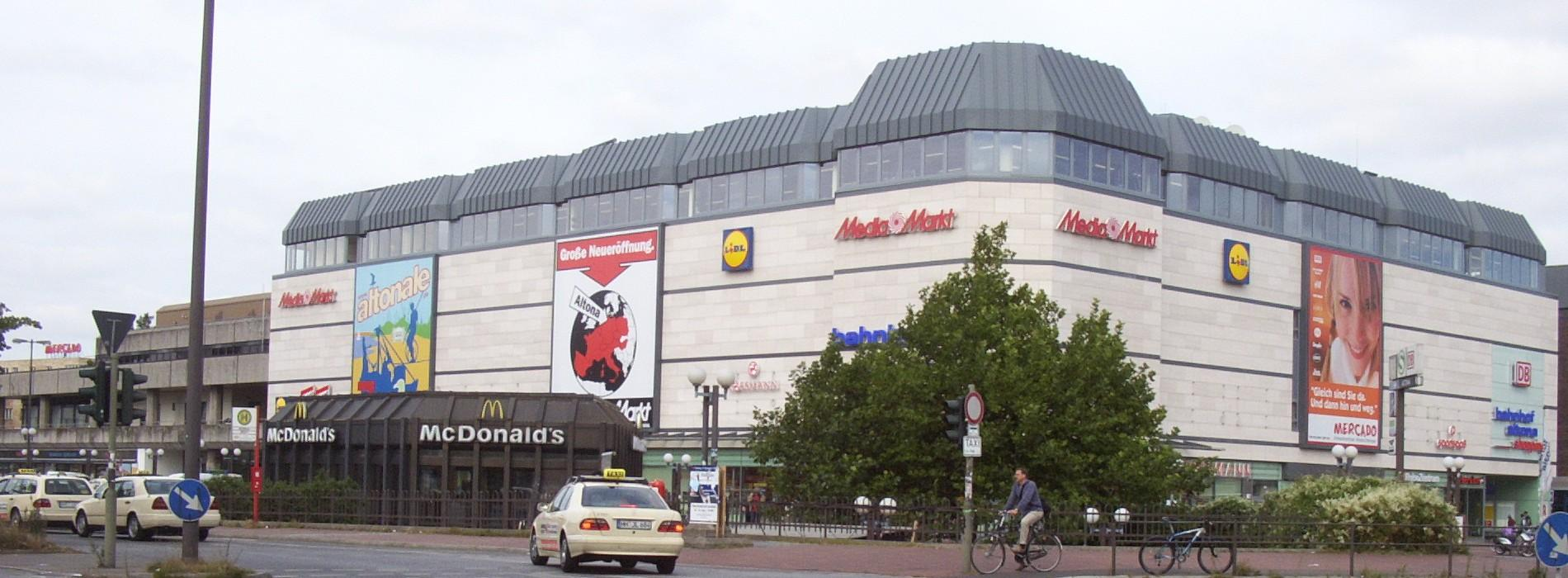

General information
- Location: Scheel-Plessen-Str. 17; 22765 Hamburg; Germany
- Coordinates: 53°33′07″N 09°56′06″E
- Lines: Deutsche Bahn ICE and regional rail; Hamburg S-Bahn: Hamburg-Altona link line; Hamburg City S-Bahn
- Platforms: 6 island
- Tracks: 12

Construction
- Accessible: Yes

Other information
- Station code: 2517
- DS100 code: AA (main line); AAS (S-Bahn)
- IBNR: 8002553
- Category: 1
- Fare zone: HVV: A/101
- Website: www.bahnhof.de

History
- Opened: 18 September 1844; 181 years ago
- Rebuilt: 1898 relocated northwards by 700 m 1950; 1979
- Electrified: 29 January 1908; 118 years ago, 6.3 kV AC system (overhead; turned off in 1955); 15 July 1940; 86 years ago, 1.2 kV DC system (3rd rail); 4 April 1965; 61 years ago, 15 kV AC system (overhead)
- Former names: 1844-1938 Altona Hauptbahnhof
Services
Preceding station	DB Fernverkehr	Following station
Terminus	ICE 1 Sprinter	Hamburg Hbf towards Passau Hbf
Terminus	ICE 4 Sprinter	Hamburg Dammtor towards Frankfurt Airport Regional
Terminus	ICE 18	Hamburg Dammtor towards München Hbf
Terminus	ICE/ECE 20	Hamburg Dammtor One-way operation
Terminus	ICE 24	Hamburg Dammtor towards Innsbruck Hbf or Schwarzach-St.Veit
Terminus	ICE 25	Hamburg Dammtor towards München Hbf
Terminus	RJ 27	Hamburg Dammtor towards Praha hl.n.
Terminus	ICE 28	Hamburg Dammtor towards München Hbf
Terminus	ICE 33	Hamburg Hbf towards Ostseebad Binz
Terminus	ICE 43	Hamburg Dammtor towards Basel SBB, Chur or Brig
Terminus	ICE 91	Hamburg Dammtor towards Wien Hbf
Preceding station	ÖBB	Following station
Terminus	Nightjet	Hamburg Dammtor towards Innsbruck Hbf or Wien Hbf
Terminus	Nightjet	Hamburg Dammtor towards Zürich HB
Preceding station	DB Regio Nord	Following station
Elmshorn towards Westerland (Sylt)	RE 6	Terminus
Preceding station		Following station
Terminus	RB 71	Pinneberg towards Itzehoe
Preceding station	Hamburg S-Bahn	Following station
Ottensen towards Wedel	S1	Königstraße towards Poppenbüttel or Hamburg Airport
Terminus	S2	Holstenstraße towards Aumühle
Diebsteich towards Pinneberg	S3	Königstraße towards Hamburg-Neugraben
Location

Hamburg-Altona (or simply Altona) is a railway station in Hamburg, Germany, situated to the west of the city's main station, in the district which bears its name.

A main line terminal station, most Intercity-Express (ICE) services linking Hamburg with southern Germany begin and terminate at Hamburg-Altona. It also has an underground station (named Altona) which is served by the rapid transit trains of the Hamburg S-Bahn. The station is managed by DB Station&Service.

== History ==
The original Altona station was built by the Altona-Kiel Railway Company at the end of the line from Kiel, some 300 metres south of the current station. It opened in 1844, at which time Altona was an independent city within the Duchy of Holstein (the old station is currently used as the present-day Altona borough's town hall).

In 1866 the link line was opened, allowing trains to run through to Klosterthor station (near the main train station) and on to Berlin or Hanover. In 1867 the Altona-Blankenese railway was opened to the towns on the right bank of the river Elbe (this line is today used by S-Bahn lines S1 and S11).

In 1898 Altona Hauptbahnhof (Altona main station) was opened at the current location. It was badly damaged during World War II but subsequently rebuilt. The building was finally demolished in the late 1970s during the construction of the City-S-Bahn despite protests; it was feared that the tunnelling would cause the structure to collapse. It was replaced by the current two-storey, low-rise precast concrete structure upon its opening in 1979.

== Future ==
In September 2009 the Hamburger Morgenpost and Die Welt revealed that Deutsche Bahn AG plans to close the long distance train station at Altona and to build a new station in the area of Diebsteich station. According to Die Welt, the city government had preliminary studies for the area to build flats and a park. Initially it was expected that the new station would open in 2016. As a result of frequent protests, that date has been delayed until December 2029.

== Station layout ==
Regional and long-distance trains start and terminate at the street-level bay platforms within the terminal. There are two underground island platforms for the Hamburg S-Bahn rapid transit trains, accessible by stairs, escalators and lifts. In front of the station there is a bus station with connections across the city.

== Station services ==
=== Trains ===
==== Long distance ====
Altona is the terminus/starting point for ICE lines 18, 24, 25, 28 and 42 to Munich, line 20 to Basel, line 27 to Prague and line 33 to Stralsund. All ICE services are run by DB Fernverkehr. In the 2026 timetable, the following services stop at the station:

Line	Route		Interval
ICE 1	Hamburg-Altona – Hamburg – Essen – Duisburg – Düsseldorf – Cologne – Bonn – Koblenz – Mainz – Frankfurt Airport (long-distance station) – Frankfurt – Würzburg – Nuremberg – Regensburg – Passau		Three times a day
ICE 4	Hamburg-Altona – Hamburg – Hanover – Frankfurt – Frankfurt Airport (regional station)		Three times a day
ICE 15	Hamburg-Altona – Hamburg – Berlin – Halle – Erfurt – Frankfurt – Darmstadt	→ Mannheim → Saarbrücken	One train
ICE 15	Hamburg-Altona – Hamburg – Berlin – Halle – Erfurt – Frankfurt – Darmstadt	← Stuttgart	One train
ICE 18	Hamburg-Altona – Hamburg – Berlin – Halle – Erfurt – Nuremberg – Munich		Every two hours
ICE/ECE 20	Hamburg-Altona ← Hamburg ← Hannover ← Frankfurt ← Mannheim ← Karlsruhe ← Freiburg ← Basel ← Bern ← Interlaken East		One train
ICE 24	Hamburg-Altona – Hamburg – Hannover – Kassel – Fulda – Würzburg – Augsburg – Munich –	Schwarzach-St. Veit	Some trains
ICE 24	Hamburg-Altona – Hamburg – Hannover – Kassel – Fulda – Würzburg – Augsburg – Munich –	Innsbruck	Some trains
ICE 25	Hamburg-Altona – Hamburg – Hannover – Kassel – Fulda – Würzburg – Nuremberg – Munich		Hourly
RJ 27	Hamburg-Altona – Hamburg – Ludwigslust – Berlin – Dresden – Prague		4 train pairs
ICE 28	Hamburg-Altona – Hamburg – Berlin – Leipzig – Erfurt – Nuremberg – Munich		Every 2 hours
ICE 33	Hamburg-Altona – Hamburg – Schwerin – Rostock – Stralsund – Ostseebad Binz/Greifswald		Every 2 hours
ICE 42	Hamburg-Altona – Hamburg – Bremen – Münster – Dortmund – (Wuppertal) / (Essen – Düsseldorf) – Cologne – Siegburg/Bonn – Frankfurt Airport – Mannheim – Stuttgart – Ulm – Augsburg – Munich		Every 2 hours
ICE 43	Hamburg-Altona – Hamburg – Bremen – Münster – Dortmund – Essen – Düsseldorf – Cologne – Siegburg/Bonn – Frankfurt Airport – Mannheim – Karlsruhe – Freiburg – Basel		Some trains
ICE 91	Hamburg-Altona – Hamburg – Hanover – Göttingen – Kassel-Wilhelmshöhe – Fulda – Würzburg – Nuremberg – Regensburg – Plattling – Passau – Linz – St. Pölten – Wien Meidling – Vienna		One train pair

==== Regional trains ====
Regional services available from Altona include number RE 6/60 to Westerland (Sylt) and RB 71 to Itzehoe and Wrist.

==== S-Bahn (Rapid transit) ====
The S1 line trains on the Blankenese line from the west of the city call at Altona and continue on towards Hamburg Hauptbahnhof via the City S-Bahn towards Hamburg Airport and the northern terminus at Poppenbüttel. Route S3 runs from Pinneberg in the north-west of the city via the Pinneberg line and continues via Jungfernstieg station and the Hauptbahnhof and via the Harburg S-Bahn towards Neugraben. Route S2 starts here and runs via the link line, Holstenstrasse station and the Hauptbahnhof towards Bergedorf and Aumühle.

=== Facilities ===
Several shops are located in the station building, along with emergency and information telephones, ticket machines, toilets, lockboxes and personnel.

== Gallery ==
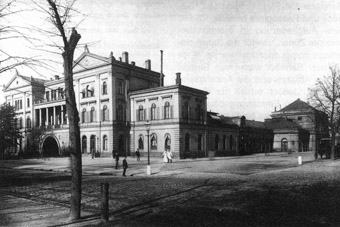
The first station with wings built in 1890, as seen from the south]

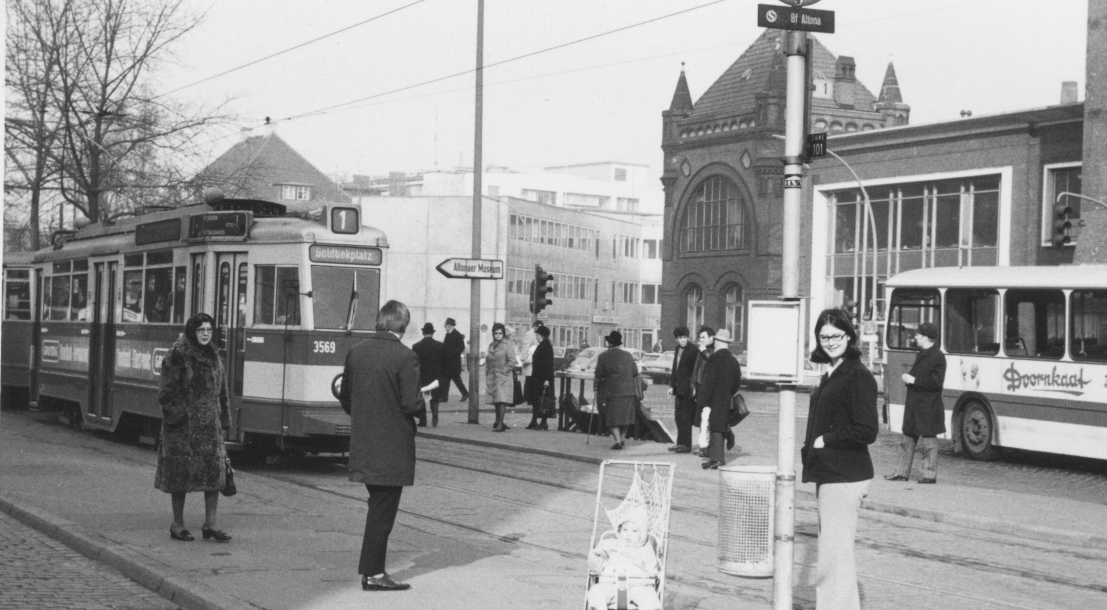
Bahnhof Altona (railway station) in 1971. Buses, trams, trains and S-Bahn trains all met here.

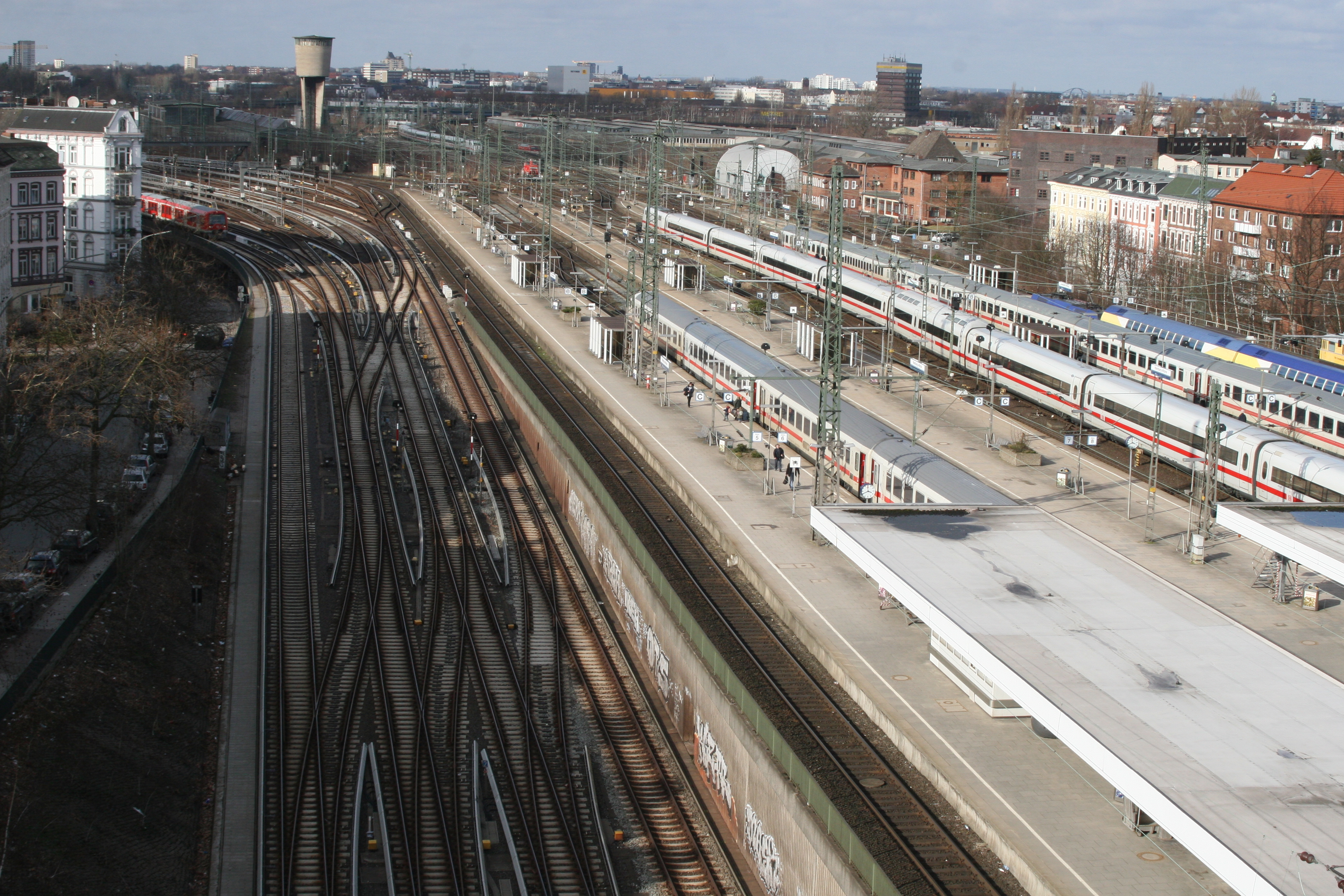
Present-day platforms and tracks

== See also ==
- Hamburger Verkehrsverbund
- List of Hamburg S-Bahn stations
- Rail transport in Germany
