= Jürgen Ruszkowski =

German maritime publisher and editor (born 1935)

Jürgen Ruszkowski (born 1935 in Stettin) was a German deacon, educator, illustrator and editor in Hamburg.

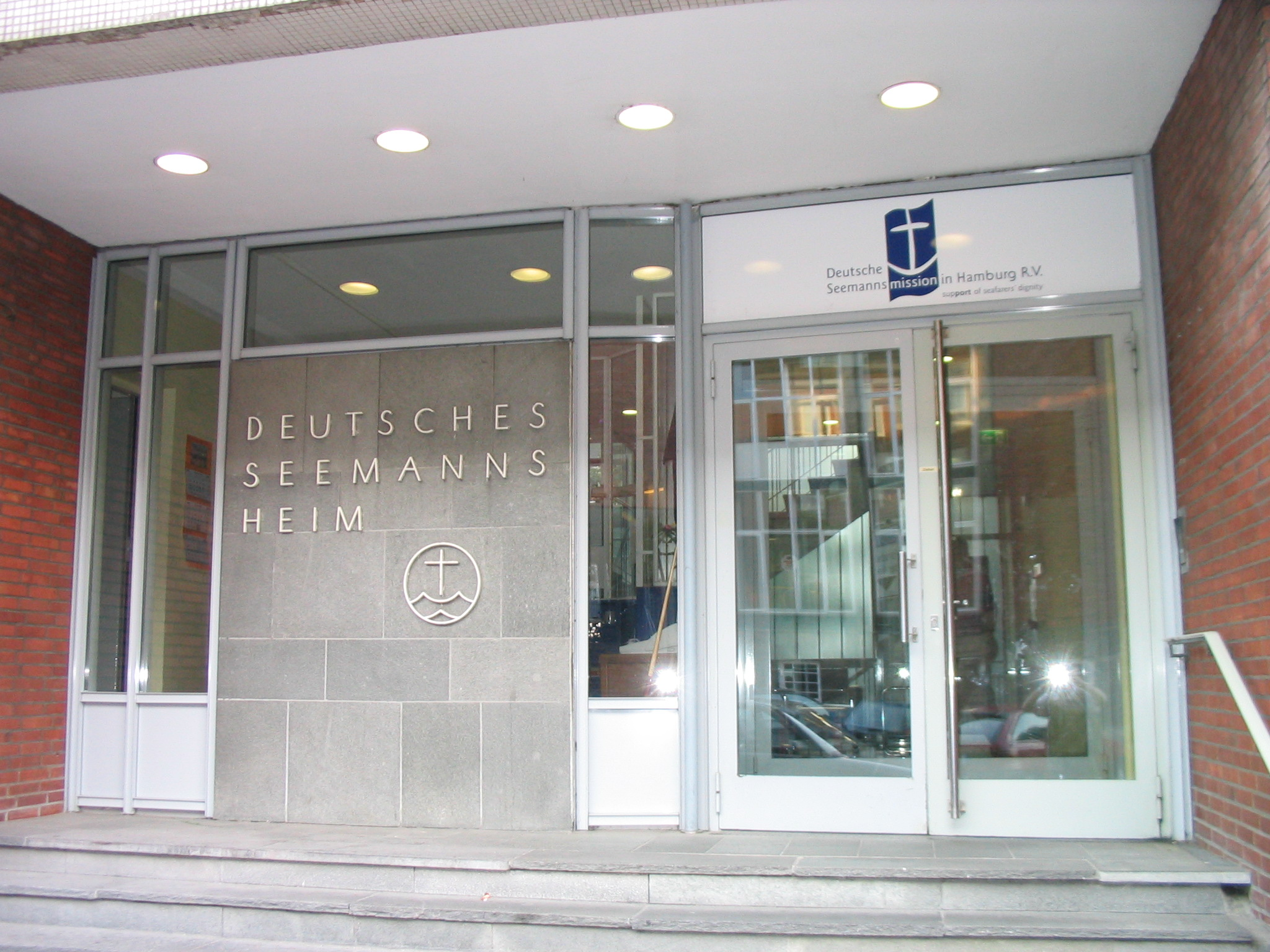
Deutsches Seemannsheim, Hamburg, Krayenkamp

Ruszkowski grew up from 1945 onward in Grevesmühlen in Mecklenburg. In 1953 he went west via West Berlin. He became a deacon and a graduate social pedagogue and worked as an educator, illustrator, and editor. From 1970 to 1997 he served as head of the Seemannsheim am Krayenkamp in Hamburg. Since 1997 he has been in active retirement and has produced more than 100 books, partly with his own texts and photographs and partly on behalf of other authors. The Maritime gelbe Buchreihe (Maritime Yellow Book Series) is published by him, it includes maritime memoirs, biographies, and historical documents, many of which are based on personal accounts by seafarers. In 2023 he published his memoirs with the title Mit 88 immer noch kreativ und mobil (Still creative and active at 88).

== See also ==
- Deutsche Seemannsmission in Hamburg (in German)

== Bibliography ==
- Jürgen Ruszkowski: Mit 88 immer noch kreativ und mobil. Band 238e in der gelben Buchreihe. 2023
- Jürgen Ruszkowski: Lebensläufe und Erlebnisberichte ehemaliger Fahrensleute: Seemannsschicksale – Band 2 in der maritimen gelben Reihe neobooks 2014, ISBN 3-847-6863-48
