= Gustav Adolf Church, Hamburg =

Gustav Adolf Church
- Schwedische Gustaf-Adolfskirche; Gustav Adolfskyrkan
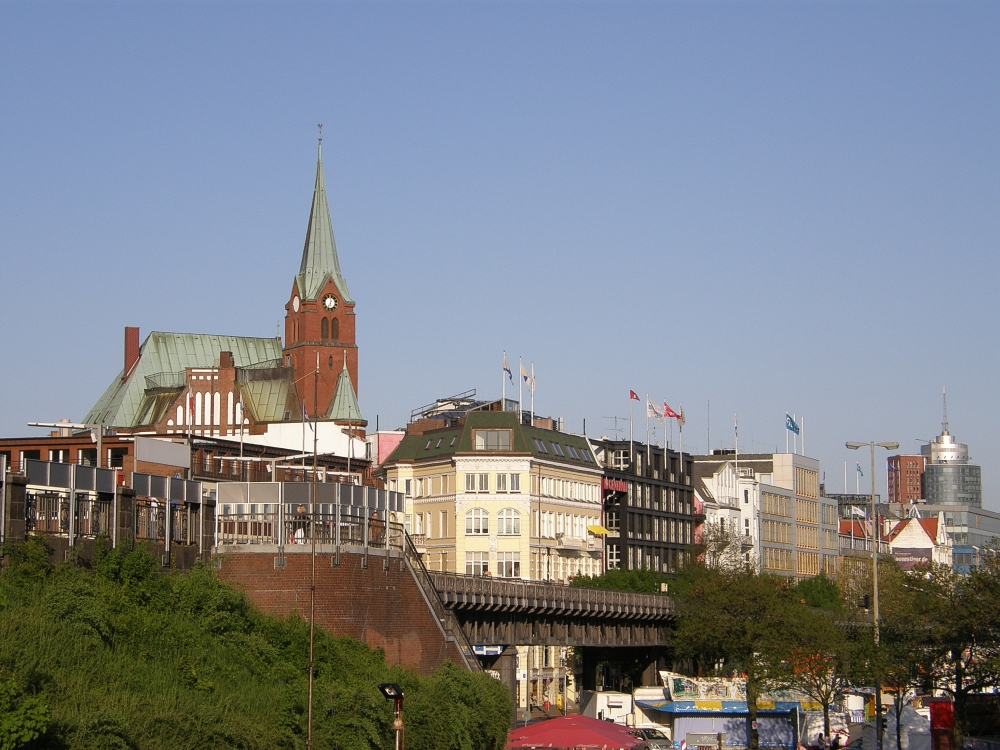
- The Gustav Adolf Church with its tower
- Gustav Adolf Church
- 53°32′45″N 9°58′23″E
- Location: Ditmar-Koel-Strasse 36, Hamburg
- Country: Germany
- Denomination: Church of Sweden

Administration
- Diocese: Church of Sweden Abroad
- Parish: Swedish Gustav Adolf

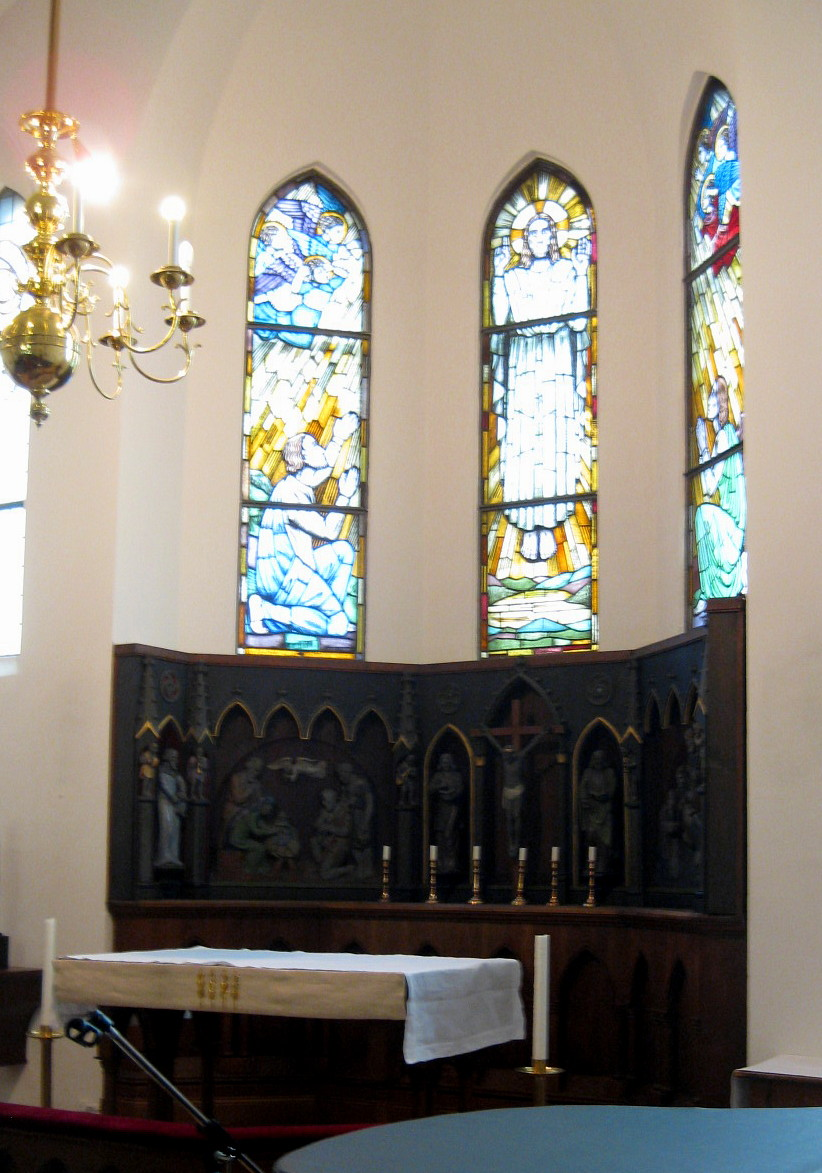
inside church

The Gustav Adolf Church (German: Schwedische Gustaf-Adolfskirche, Swedish: Gustaf Adolfskyrkan) is a church building in Hamburg-Neustadt, Germany. It belongs to the Church of Sweden, and was built between 1906-1907.
