= Neustadt, Hamburg =

District of Hamburg, Germany

Neustadt
- District of Hamburg
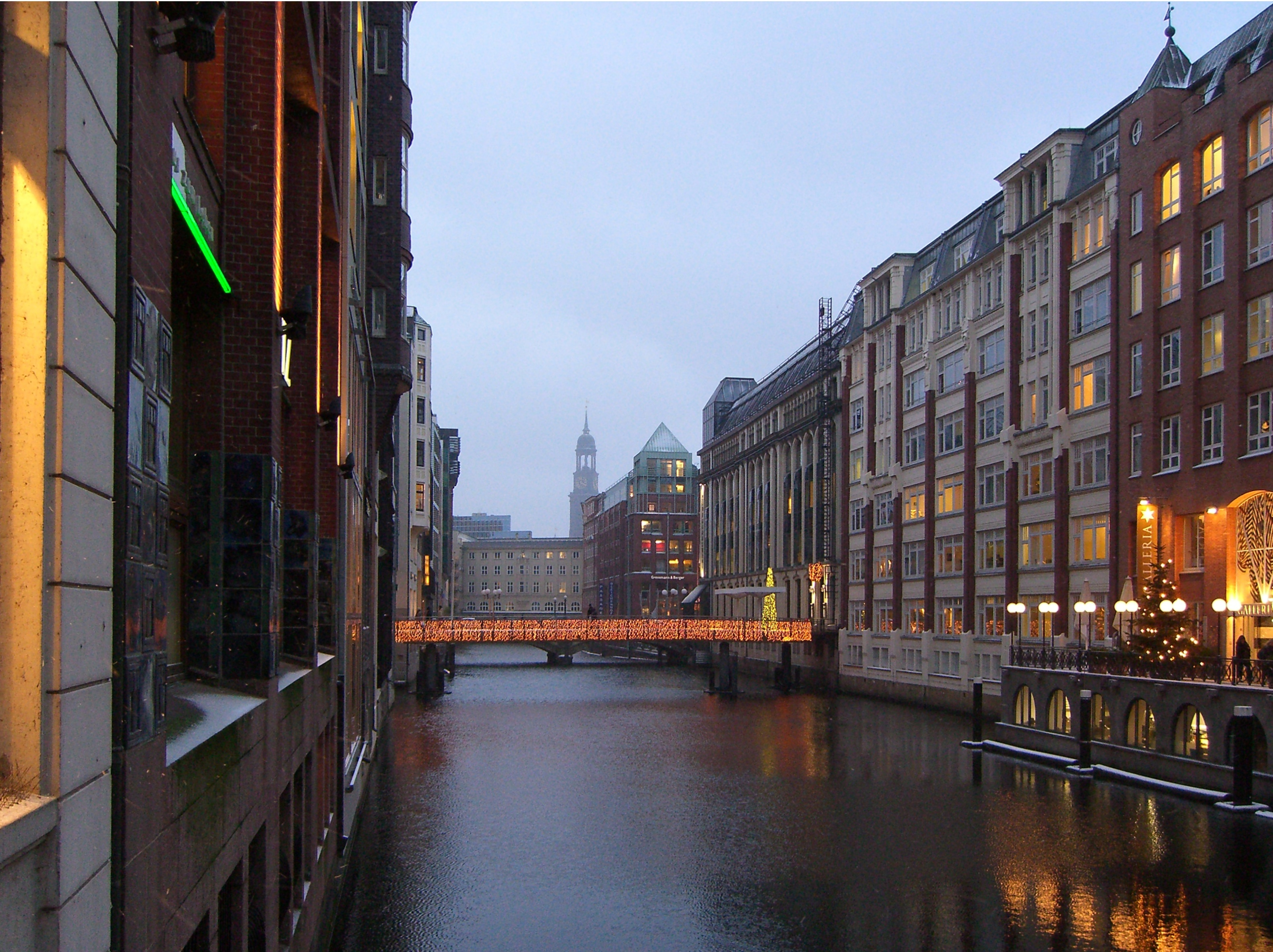
- Bleichenfleet, one of the canals in Neustadt, with the tower of St. Michaelis in the background

- Location of Neustadt within Hamburg-Mitte
- Interactive map of Neustadt
- Location within Germany Location within Hamburg
- Coordinates: 53°33′7″N 9°59′8″E
- Country: Germany
- State: Hamburg
- City: Hamburg
- Borough: Hamburg-Mitte

Area
  - Total: 2.2 km^{2} (0.85 sq mi)
- Elevation: 10 m (33 ft)

Population (2024-12-31)
  - Total: 12,710
  - Density: 5,800/km^{2} (15,000/sq mi)
- Time zone: UTC+01:00 (CET)
  - Summer (DST): UTC+02:00 (CEST)
- Dialling codes: 040
- Vehicle registration: HH
- Website: www.hamburg.de

Neustadt (German: [ˈnɔʏʃtat]; lit. 'New town') is one of the inner-city districts of the Free and Hanseatic City of Hamburg, Germany.

== History ==
By 1529, Hamburg was firmly anchored in Lutheran Reformation and had successfully managed to divert its trade away from the Baltic to more dynamic markets along the Atlantic. Hamburg's economy boomed, between 1526 and 1551 the state budget tripled, and the Hanseatic city had become a major trade and capital market. Meanwhile, persecution of Protestants in the Low Countries, other parts of Germany, Portugal, Spain and various other parts of Europe caused an immense influx of religious refugees into Hamburg. Between 1500 and 1600, the population of Hamburg tripled to 40,000, surpassing Lübeck as largest German port city.

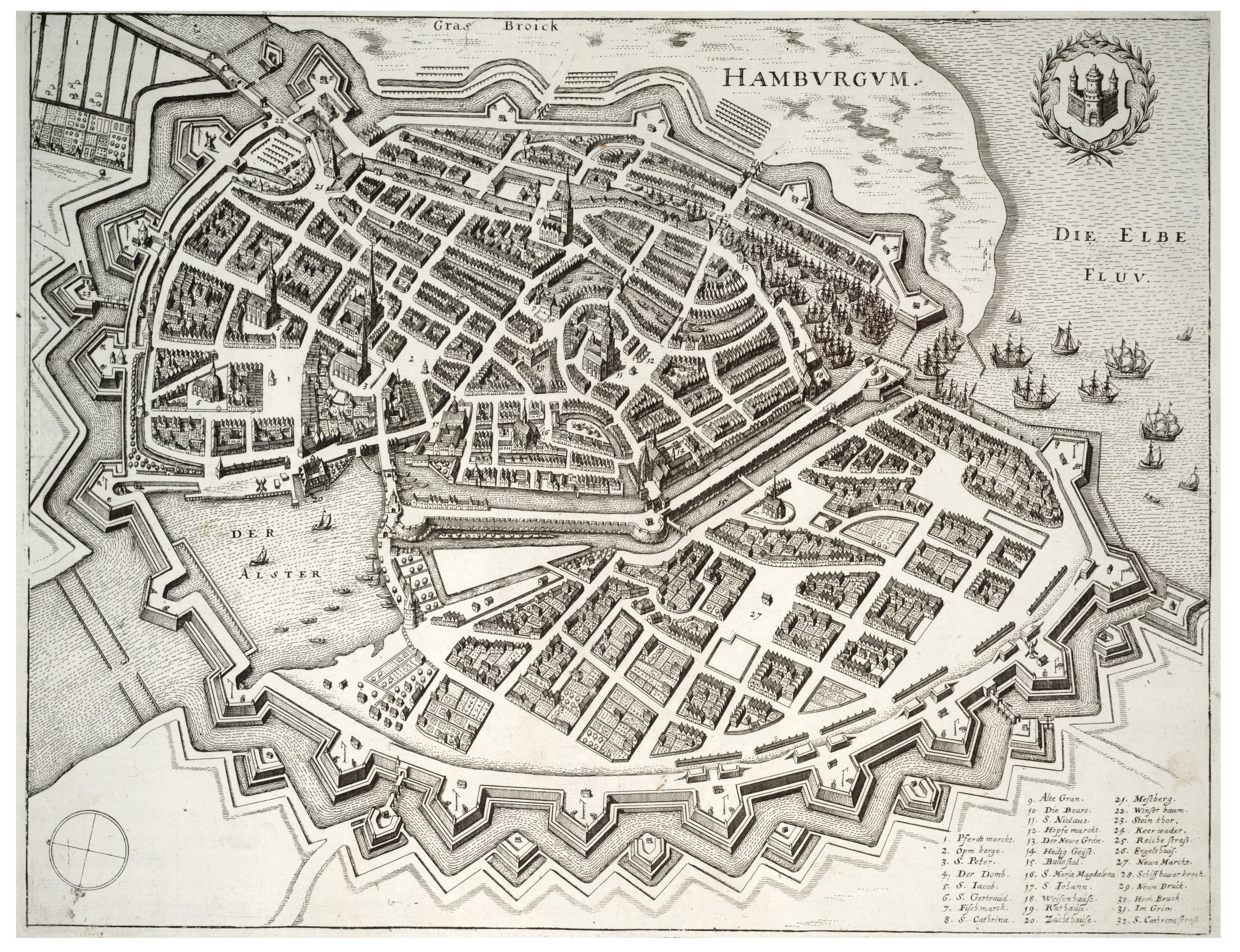
South-oriented map of Hamburg (1641) by Matthäus Merian

In advance of the Thirty Years' War (1618–1648), the Hamburg Senate commissioned Dutch military engineer Johan van Valckenburgh to strengthen the city's defenses. The new Hamburg Ramparts (Wallanlagen) were also meant to meet demand for additional space to be within the city. When completed in 1626, the ramparts enclosed all of Altstadt, plus an almost equally large area west of it: the so-called Neustadt.

Neustadt was laid out in a mostly rectangular street grid, though not much of that is recognizable today. Additionally, three principal streets connected the old town (Alstadt) east of the Alster River with the two new city-gates out west. Each of these three streets was given a market square at half distance: Gänsemarkt in the northern Neustadt, Schaarmarkt in the southern Neustadt, and Großneumarkt in the very center. The northern Neustadt around Gänsemarkt became the location of choice for wealthy and well-off citizens. Later this area developed into Hamburg's opera district, and the area around Jungfernstieg eventually developed into an elegant shopping district. In contrast, many parts of the southern Neustadt the less affluent home of the port's workers. Up until the late 19th and early 20th centuries, Neustadt was famous for its many Gängeviertel: areas with narrow alleys (Low German: Gänge). In 1893 Neustadt was ravaged by a cholera epidemic. It was never eradicated, due to unsustainable hygienic conditions, and by the 1960s most of the Gängeviertel had been demolished.

== Geography ==
Neustadt is bordered by Binnenalster lake and the Alster river to the east, the Elbe river to the south, and the former Wallanlagen (now made up of a string of parks, including Planten un Blomen) to the west and north-west. Except for the blocks around Fleetinsel and the Alster's canals in the eastern part of the district, most of Neustadt lies on a geest slope above the Elbe. Districts bordering Neustadt are (starting clockwise in the north-west): St. Pauli, Rotherbaum, Altstadt and HafenCity.

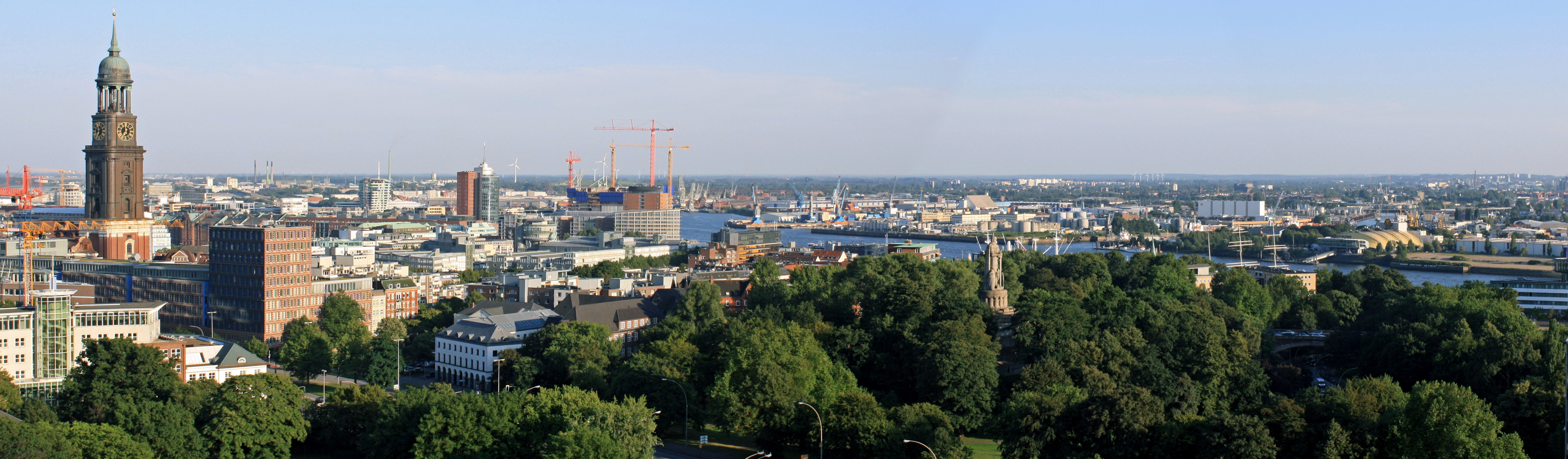
Skyline of the southern Neustadt: the tower of St. Michaelis (Michel), and view across Elbe and Port; visible in the background are construction cranes in HafenCity

=== Subdivisions ===
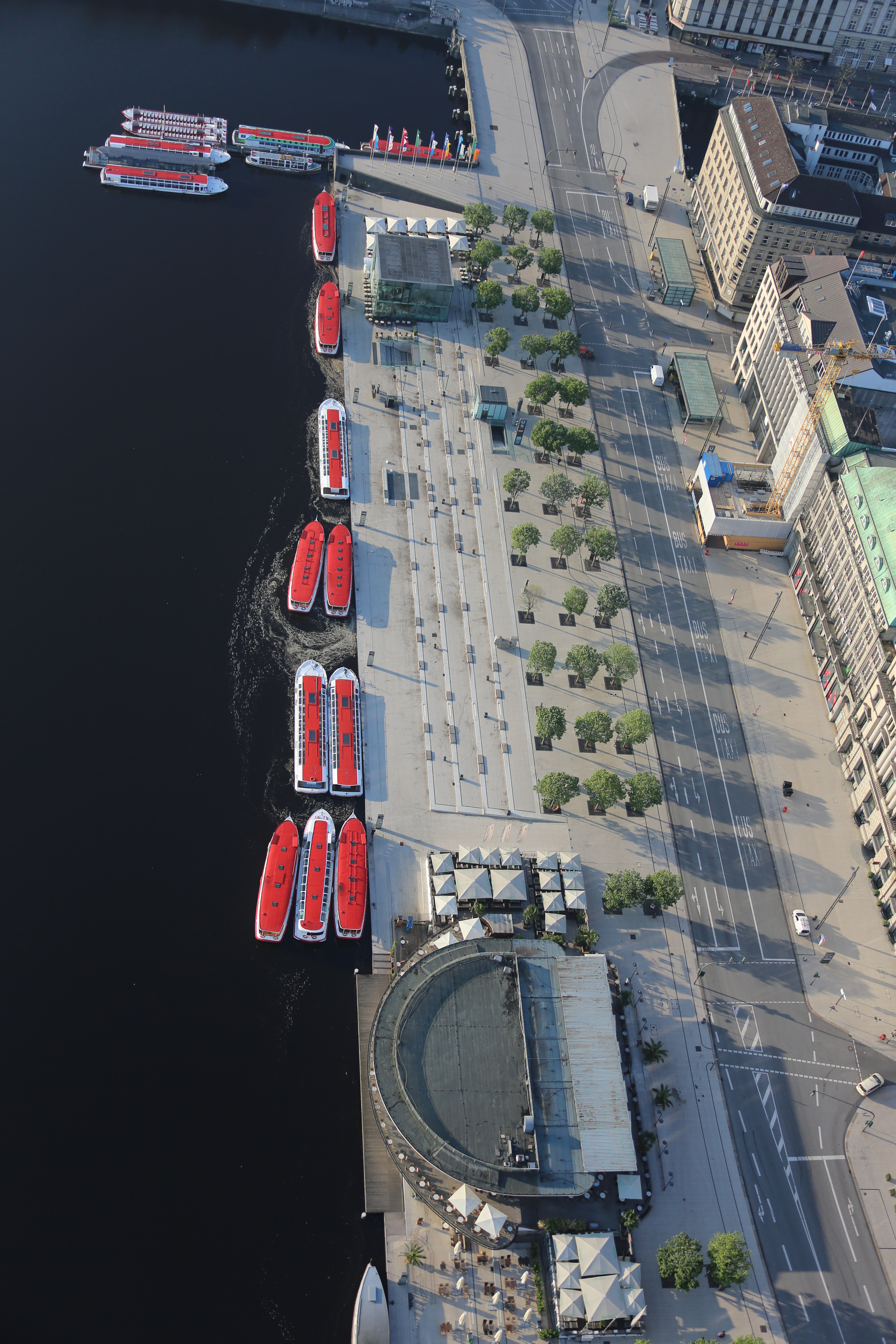
Aerial view of the Jungfernstieg, before the start of the working day

For statistical and planning purposes, Neustadt has four designated localities (German: Ortsteile) and quarters (German: Viertel, or specifically used in Hamburg: Quartier); these are not recognized as administrative subdivisions.

Map	Locality	Quarter	Description
	104	Südliche Neustadt (lit. 'Southern Neustadt')	Residential district, in parts also mixed use centered around St. Michaelis and located between Elbe and Ludwig-Erhard-Straße; includes the Portugiesenviertel
	105	Nördliche Neustadt (lit. 'Northern Neustadt')	Mixed use district located between Ludwig-Erhard-Straße and Kaiser-Wilhelm-Straße; includes Großneumarkt and the Composers Quarter.
	106	Nördliche Neustadt (lit. 'Northern Neustadt')	Fleetinsel and adjoining blocks
	107	Opern-Quartier (lit. 'Opera quarter')	Theater and shopping district – including Colonnaden street – nestled between Gänsemarkt, the Binnenalster at Neuer Jungfernstieg and Ring 1 along Planten un Blomen near Stephansplatz. Named after the Hamburg State Opera (Staatsoper).
	107	Passagenviertel (lit. 'shopping passages')	Shopping district stretching from Jungfernstieg and the Binnenalster to Stadthausbrücke, bordered by Alsterfleet and Gänsemarkt.

=== Streets and squares ===
On its western and north-western borders, Neustadt is encircled by "Ring 1" (Holstenwall, Gorch-Fock-Wall, Esplanade), a 1880s-built ring road continuing into Altstadt. Ludwig-Erhard-Straße is a 1960s-built thoroughfare and part of Bundesstraße 4, crossing Neustadt midway from east to west.

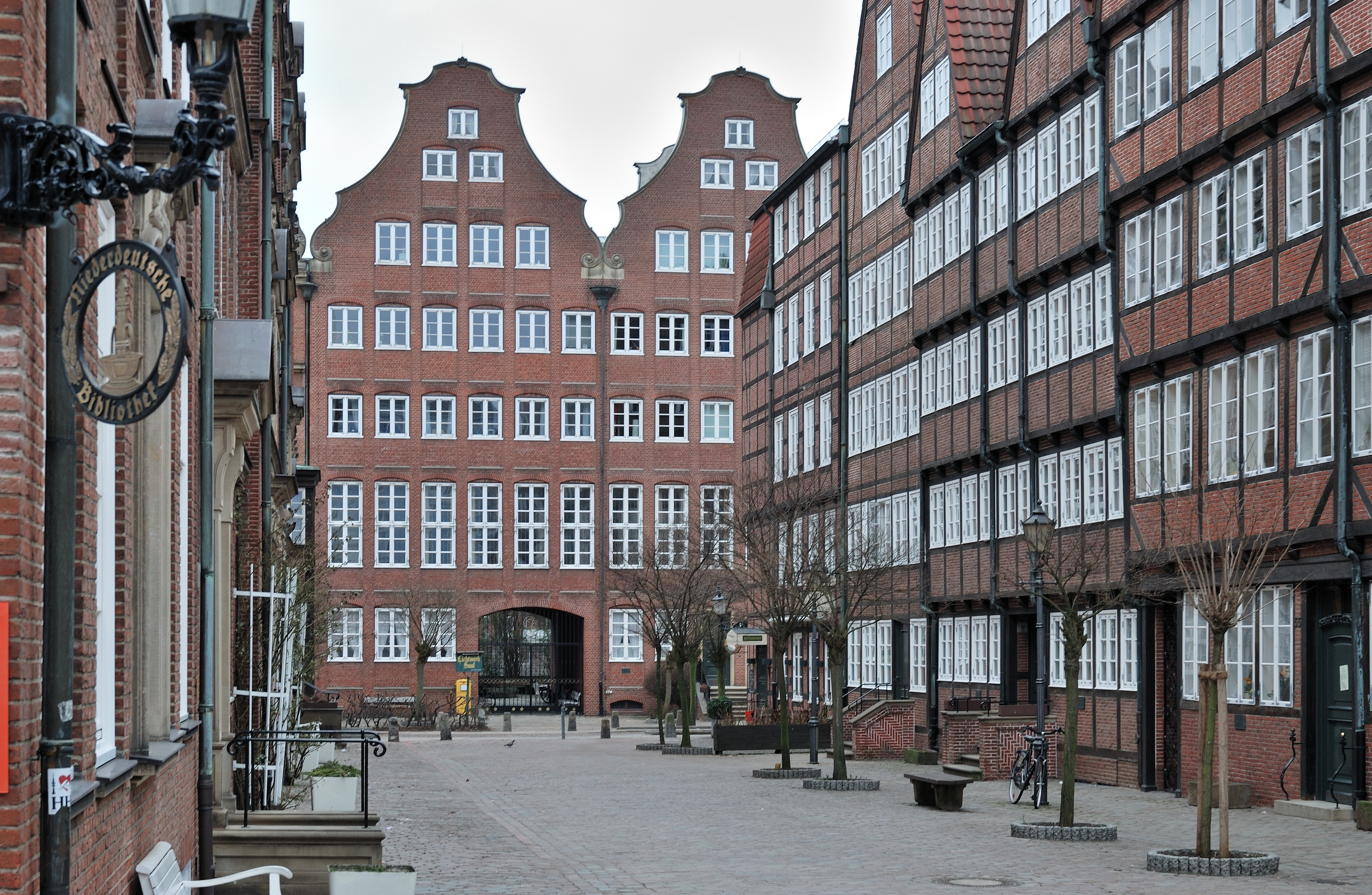
Peterstraße

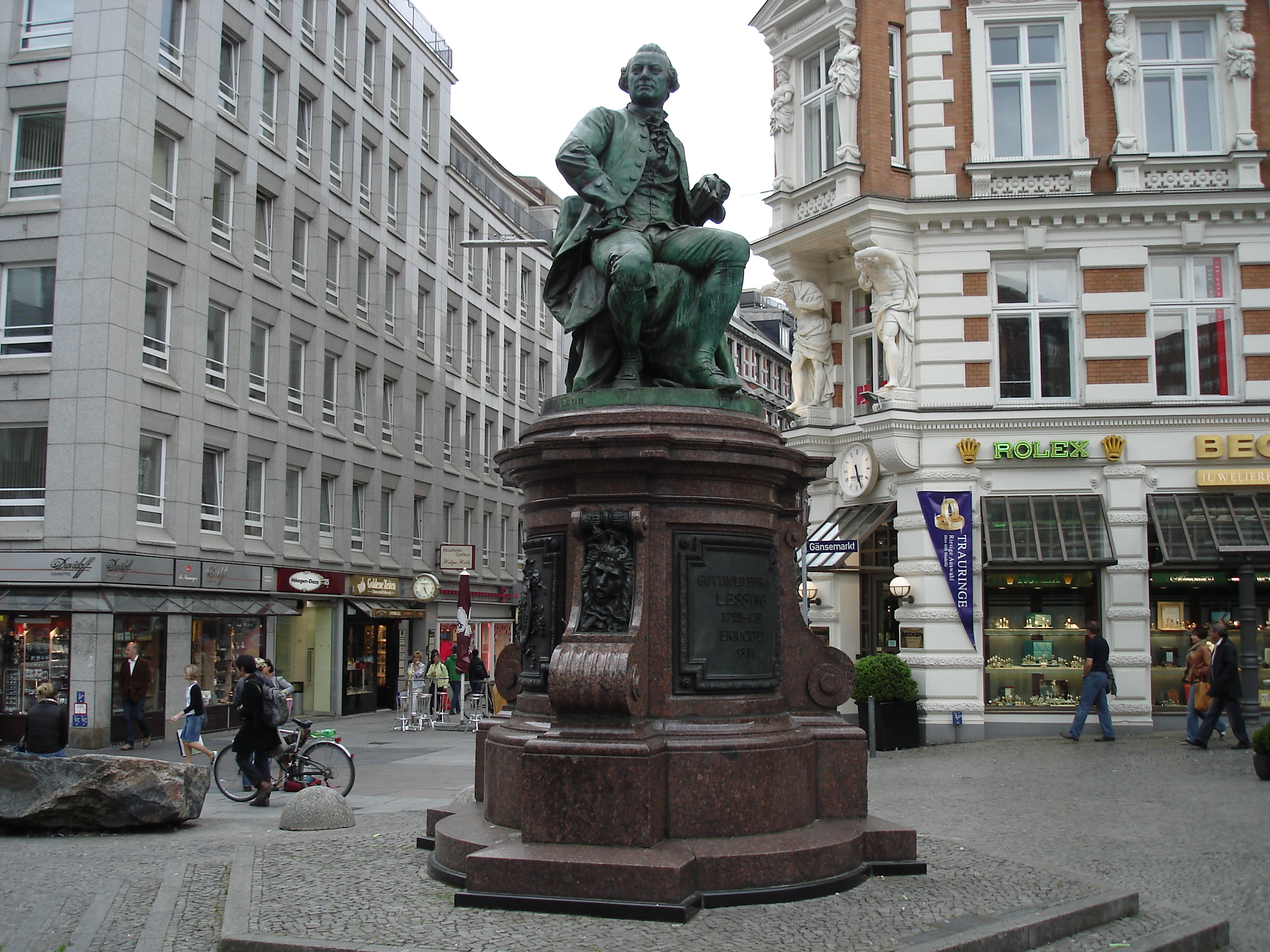
Gänsemarkt

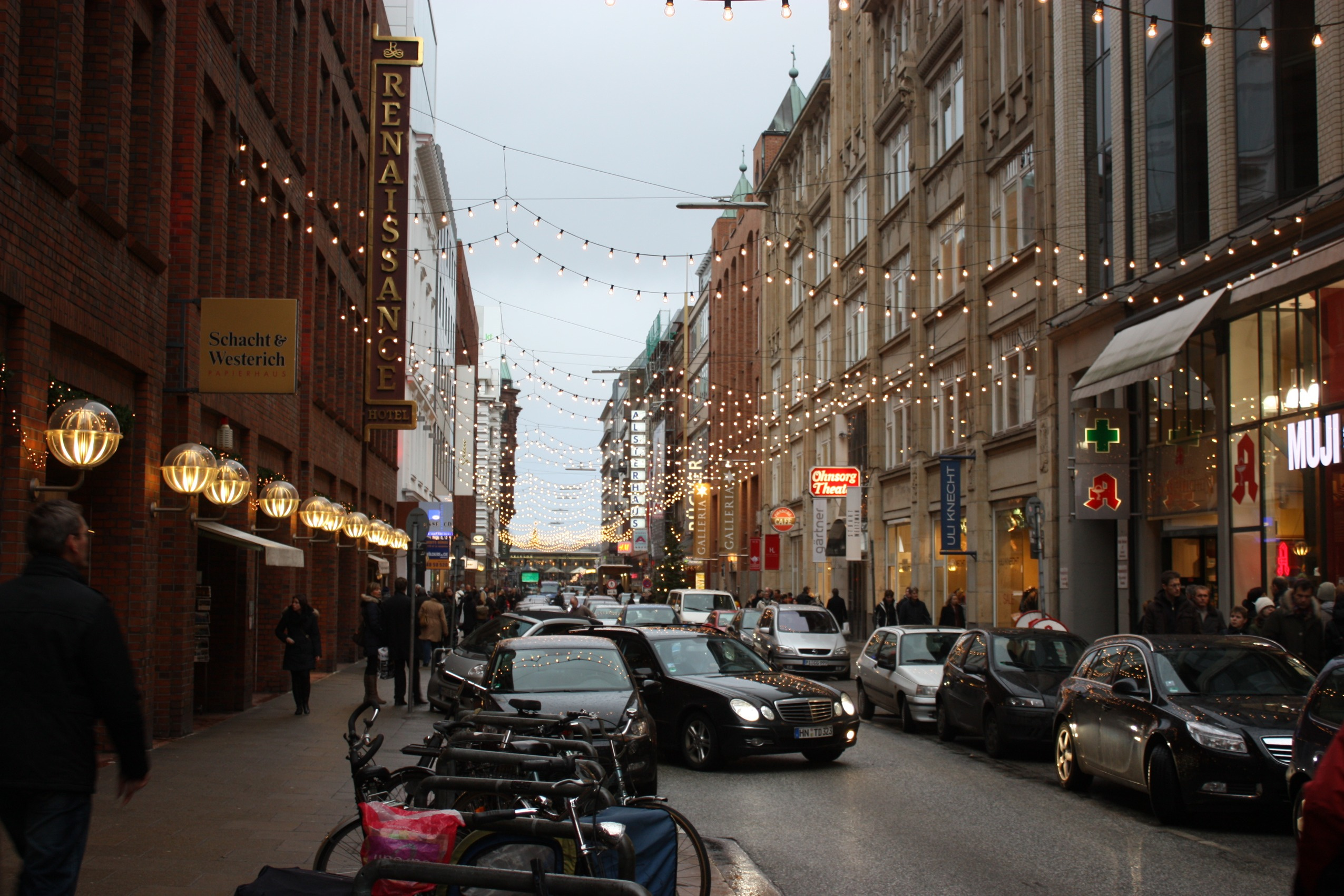
Große Bleichen

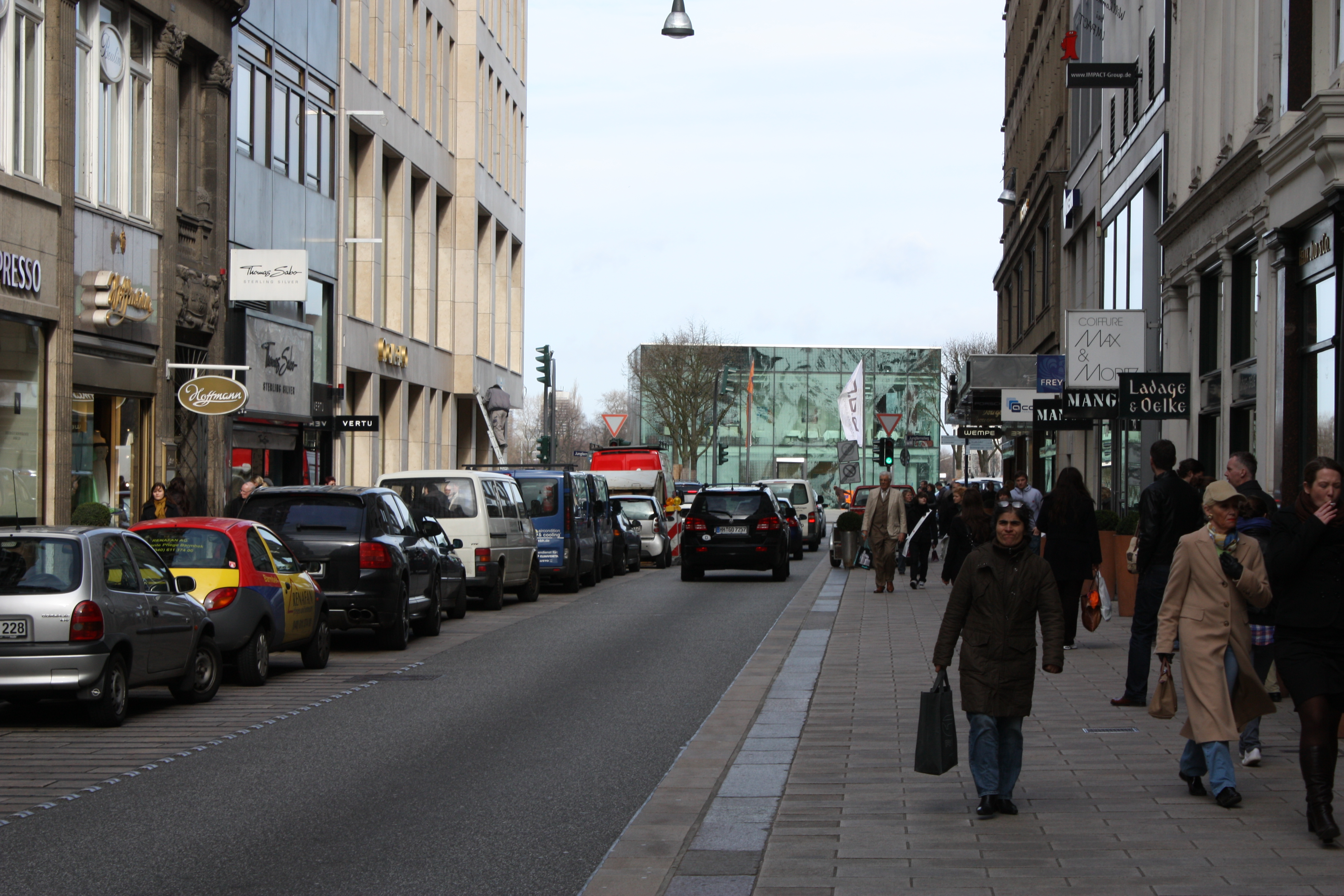
Neuer Wall

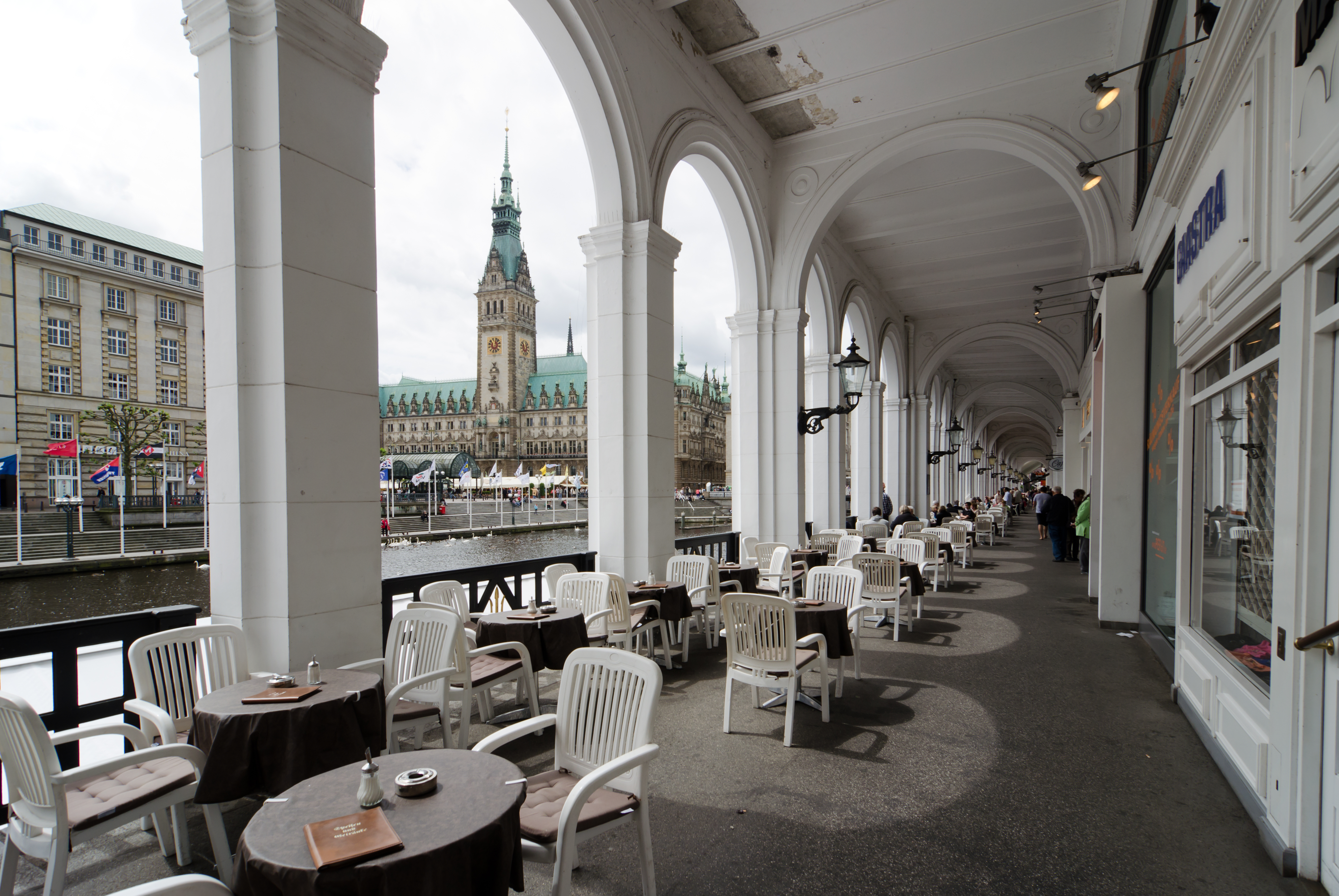
Alsterarkaden

Other notable streets are most of the shopping streets around Jungfernstieg and Gänsemarkt, and a couple of streets between St. Michaelis and the Elbe's embankment at Baumwall and Vorsetzen. Important squares in Neustadt include Johannes-Brahms-Platz, Gänsemarkt, Großneumarkt, Millerntorplatz, Schaarmarkt, Sievekingplatz, Stephansplatz, and Zeughausmarkt.

== Culture ==
=== Landmarks and cultural heritage ===
Like neighboring Altstadt, Neustadt is packed with landmarks and cultural heritage.

The single most important landmark in Neustadt is the Church of St. Michaelis (St. Michael's), one of Hamburg's five Lutheran main-churches (German: Hauptkirchen). St. Michaelis became Neustadt's Lutheran parish in 1647, but was not granted political rights until 1677; it was recognised as a college by the city's parliament in 1685. Other notable churches in Neustadt include four Nordic missions to seafarers: the Danish Seamen's Church Abroad (Benedikte), the Finnish Seamen's Mission, the Norwegian Church Abroad, and the Church of Sweden Abroad (Gustav Adolf); and the Anglican Church of England (St. Thomas Becket).

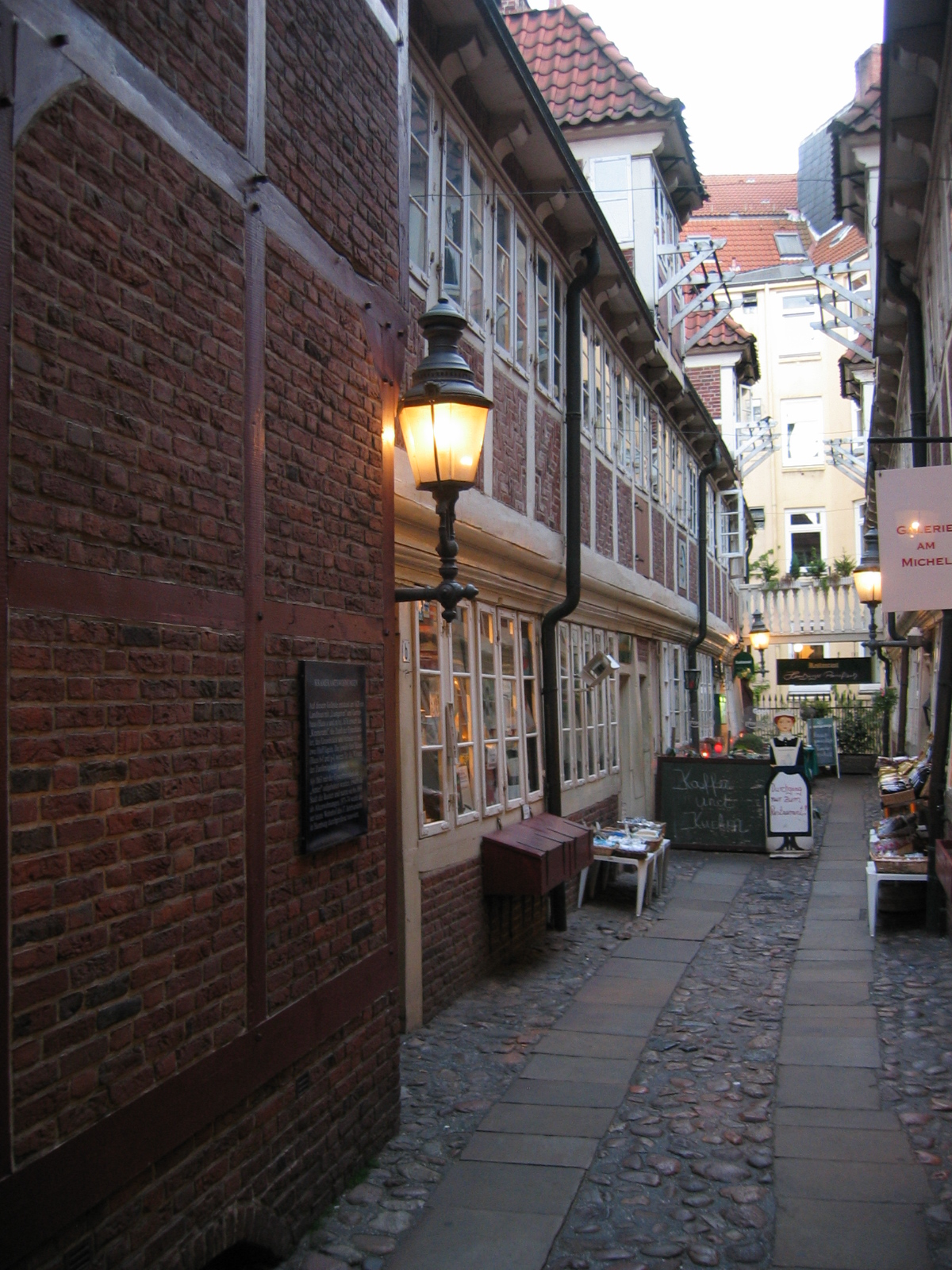
Krameramtsstuben (lit. 'Grocers' apartments')

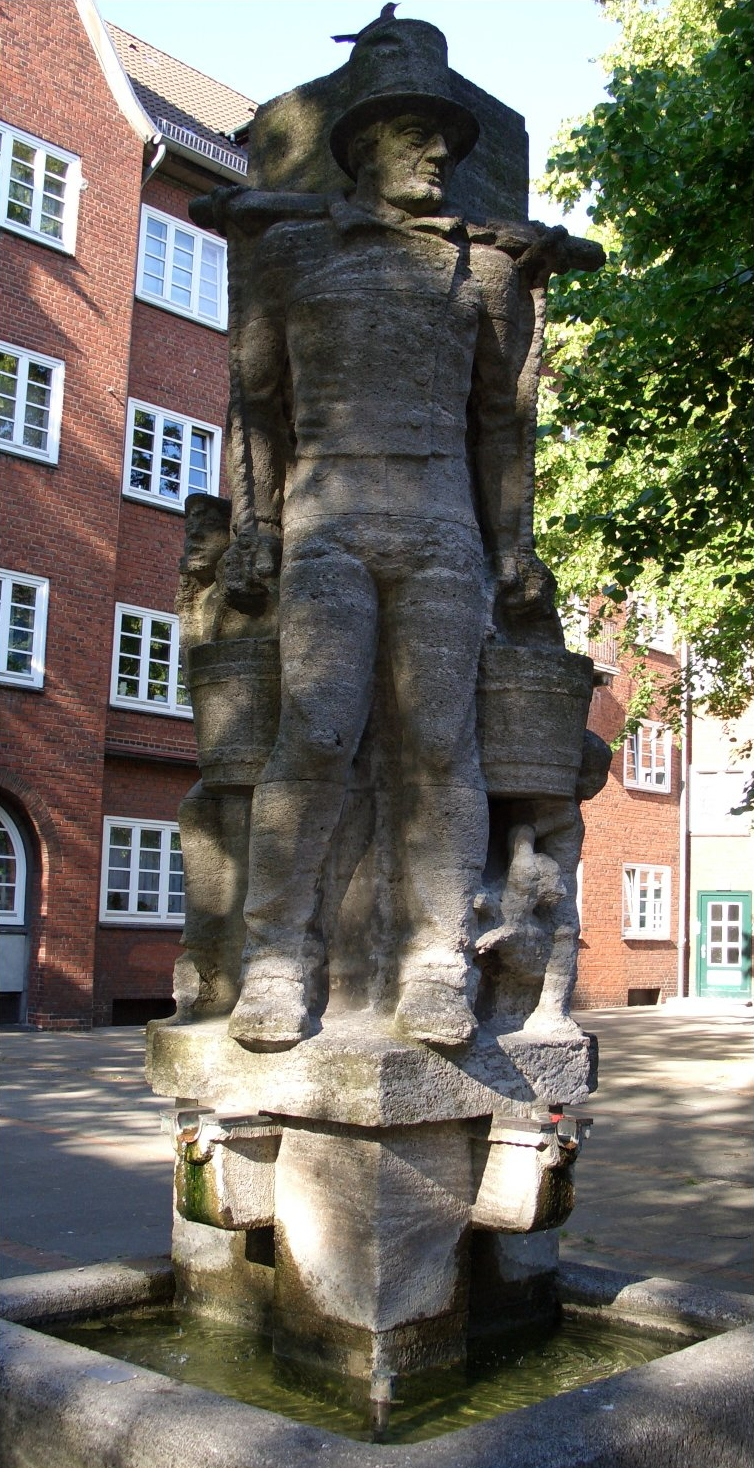
Hummel-Fountain

Up until the late 19th and early 20th century, Neustadt was famous for its many Gängeviertel: quarters with narrow alleys (Low German: Gänge). However, due to unsustainable hygienic conditions, by the 1960s most of them had been demolished. The Krameramtsstuben (lit. 'Grocers' Apartments') are one of the few preserved examples from that time. At Rademachergang is a fountain dedicated to Hans Hummel (1787–1854), a former water carrier and one of Hamburg's beloved Originale, or "original character".

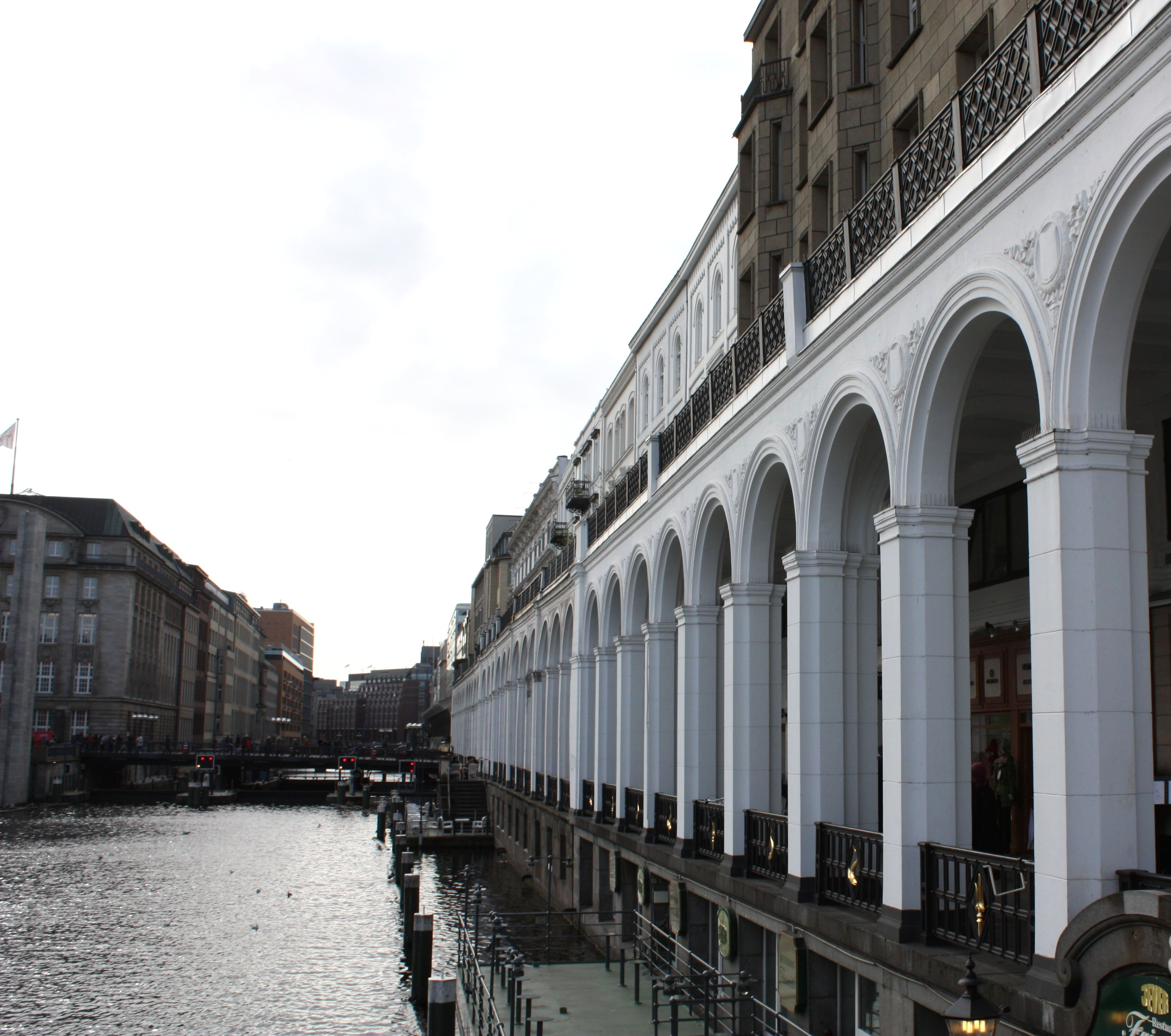
Exterior of Alsterarkaden, with view onto Alster and the Rathaus.

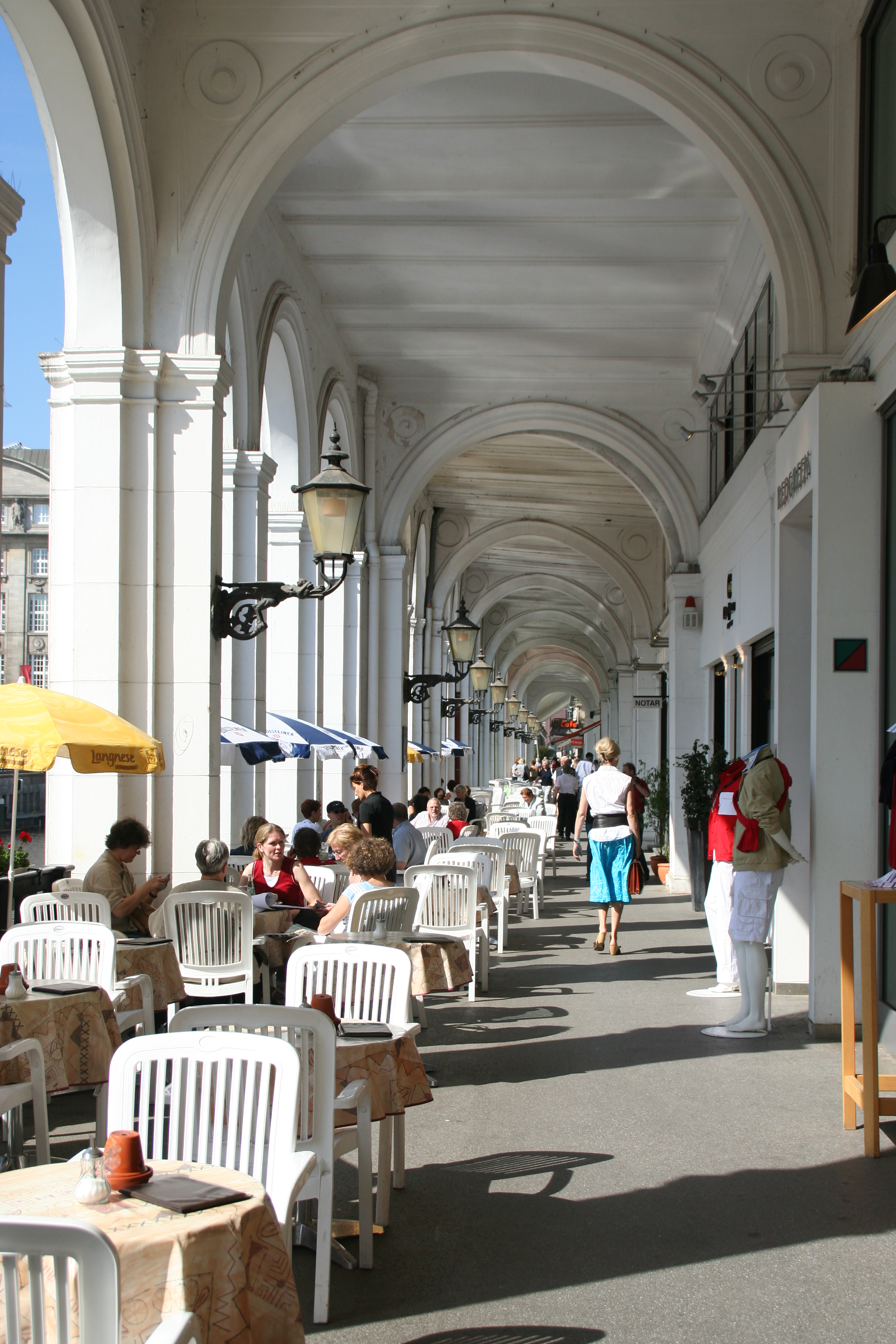
Inside of Alsterarkaden, seen from Jungfernstieg.

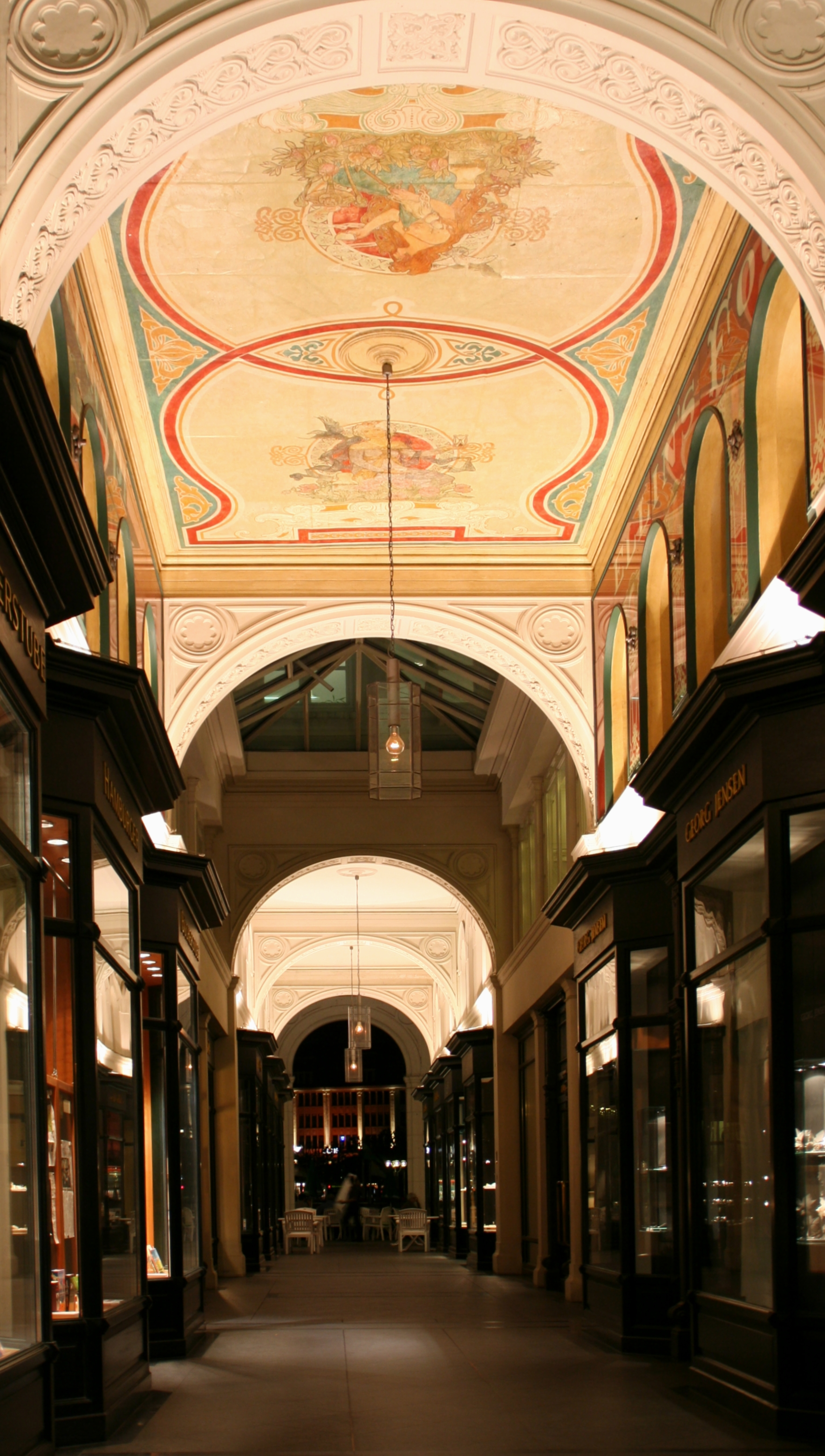
Mellin-Passage, from Neuer Wall.

The Alsterarkaden is an open arcade, spanning some 200 m (660 ft) along the entire north-west side of Kleine Alster. Designed by Alexis de Chateauneuf (1799–1853) and built in the year after the Great Fire (1842), it was one of the first buildings in the redeveloped urban ensemble between Jungfernstieg and Rathausmarkt. Today they are the center of the Passagenviertel.

The Hanseatic Higher Regional Court (Hanseatisches Oberlandesgericht or "HansOLG") was founded in 1879 as the common supreme court of the three Hanseatic and republican city-states of Bremen (part of HansOLG until 1947), Hamburg (sole user today) and Lübeck (part of HansOLG until 1937). The courthouse at Wallanlagen was built between 1907 and 1912.

The Hübner Haus, an office building and former marzipan factory, café, and pastry shop, was the first concrete building erected in Hamburg when completed in 1909.

=== Museums and cultural institutions ===
- Museums
  - Hamburg Museum
  - Cap San Diego – Museum ship
  - Rickmer Rickmers – Museum ship
- Music and performing arts venues
  - State Opera (Staatsoper)
  - Laeiszhalle
  - Fliegende Bauten
  - Opernloft
