= Große Bleichen =

Shopping street in Hamburg, Germany

Coordinates: 53.55272°N 9.98886°E

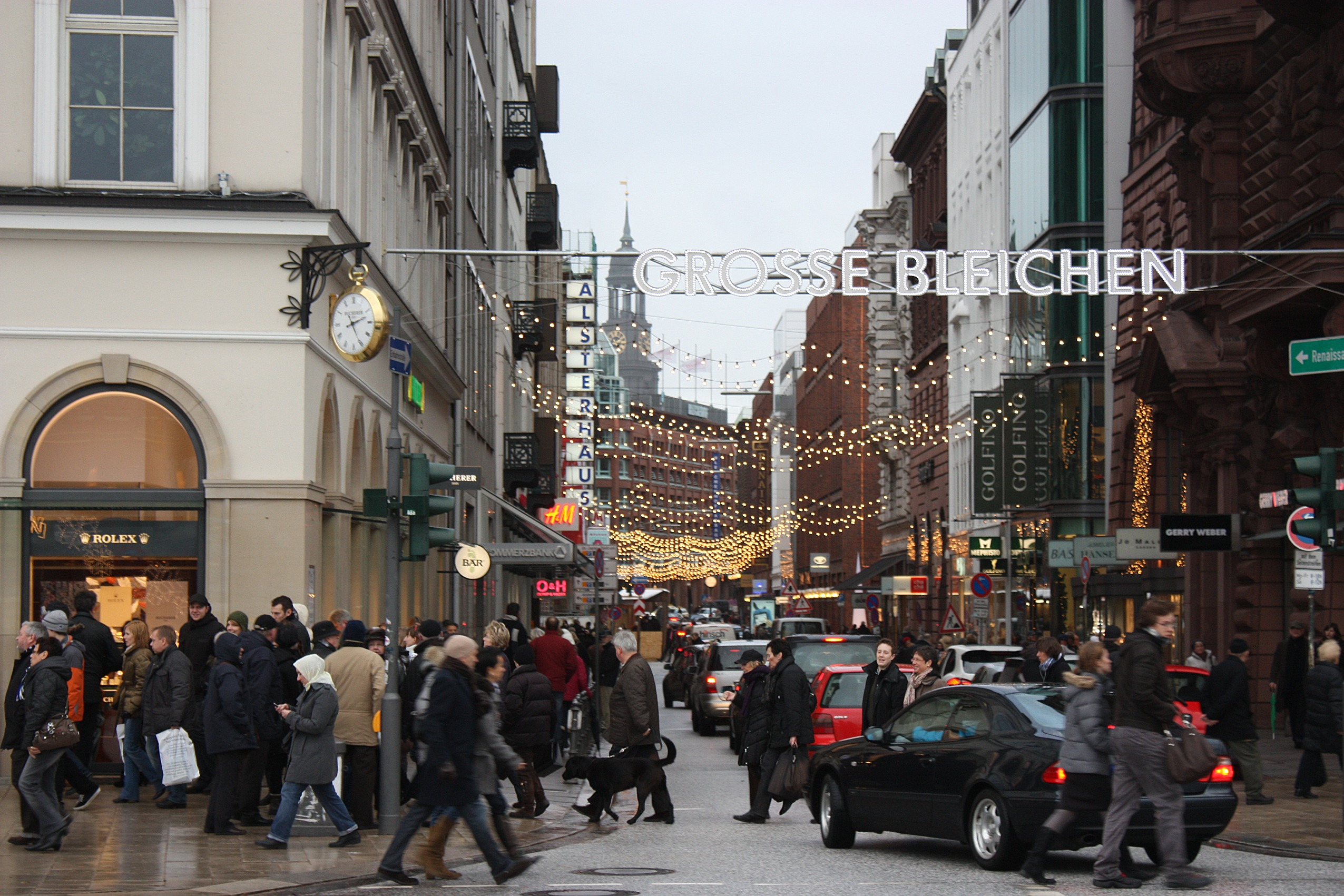
Große Bleichen during Christmas season 2010, seen from Jungfernstieg

Große Bleichen (pl. in German, also Die Großen Bleichen) are an upmarket shopping street in the Neustadt quarter of Hamburg, Germany.

== Location ==
Große Bleichen are located in the Passagenviertel (passage quarter), a busy shopping district including some luxury brands. It leads from Jungfernstieg on Lake Binnenalster in the direction of the Großneumarkt square, the center of Neustadt quarter, crossing the streets of Heuberg/Bleichenbrücke. At Axel Springer square, the street is continued by the street of Wexstraße.

== Buildings ==
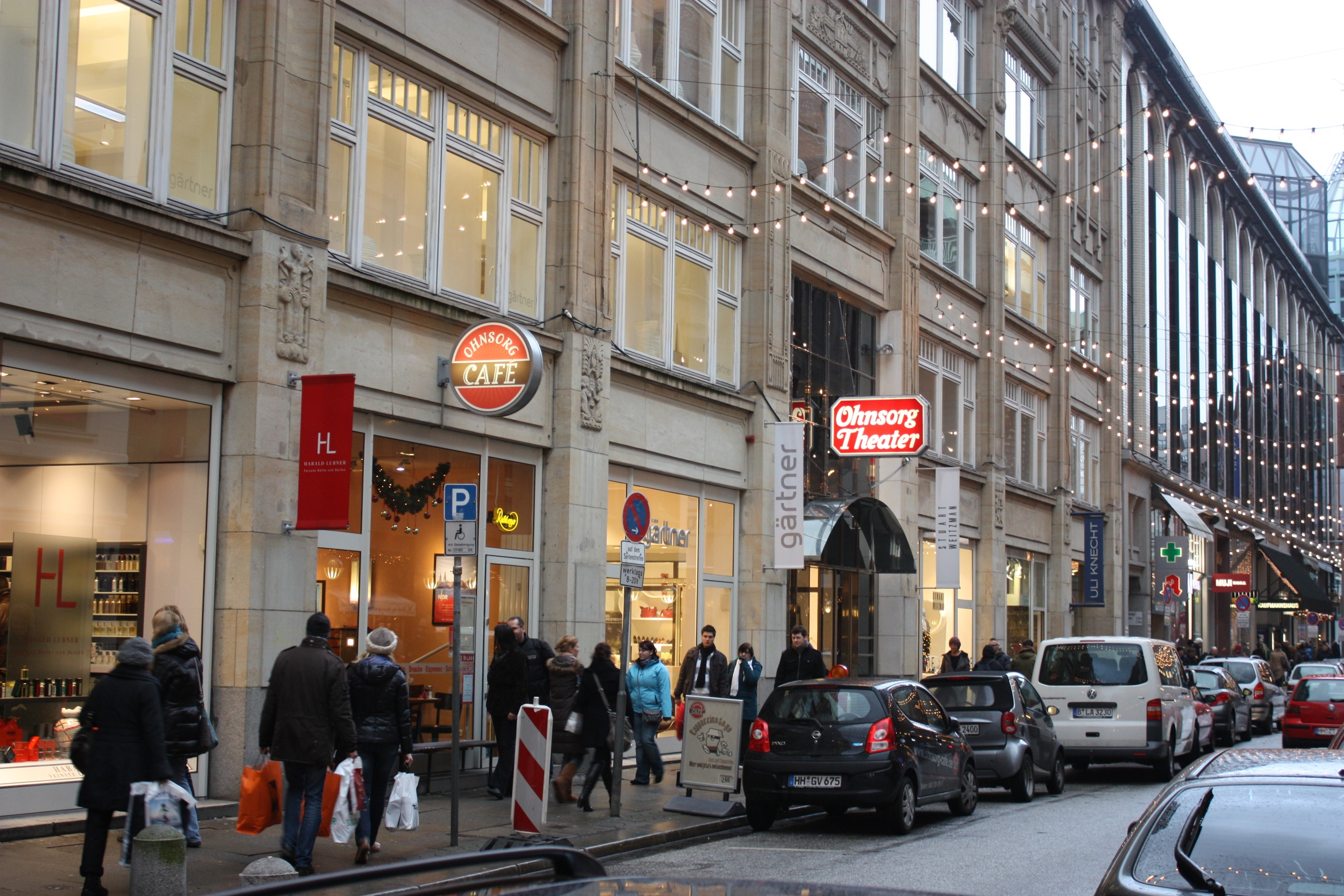
Former Ohnsorg theatre building in 2010

At Große Bleichen there are many shop-fronts and passage entrances, including Hamburger Hof, Hanse-Viertel (Hanse quarter), Galleria, Kaufmannshaus (Merchant's House) and Bleichenhof. Some restaurants and cafés can be found here as well. Ohnsorg theatre was located here until it moved to its new location near Hauptbahnhof (main station) in 2011. Hamburg public libraries had their central library at the street from 1986 to 2004, when it moved to Hühnerposten, also near the main station.

== History ==
The street was built in 1718, the name was first recorded in 1732. "Bleichen" means to bleach, Hamburg residents bleached their linen on the nearby fields, and also commercial bleachers could be found near the street.

== See also ==
- Neuer Wall (parallel shopping street)
- List of leading shopping streets and districts by city
