= Gänsemarkt =

Square in Hamburg, Germany

Coordinates: 53.5550°N 9.9883°E

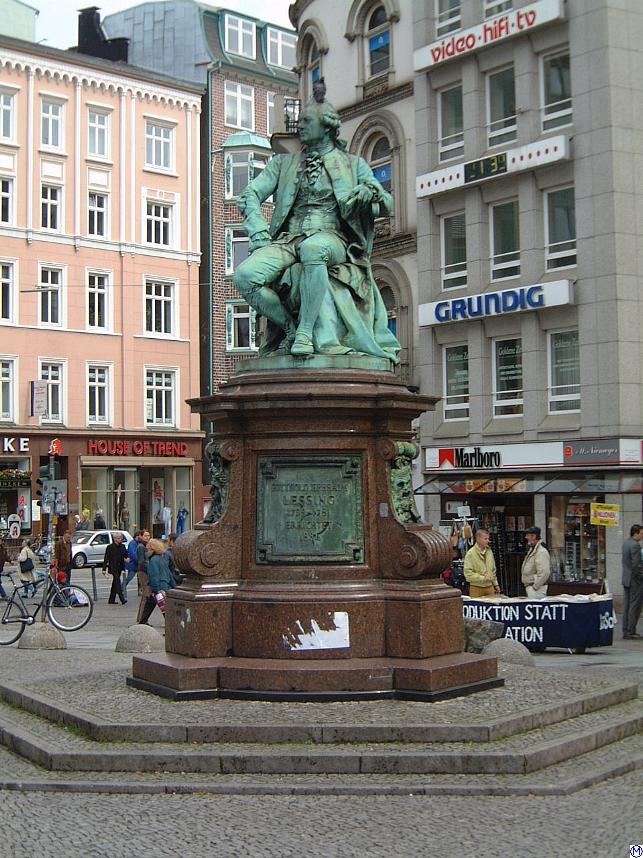
Lessing Monument on the Gänsemarkt

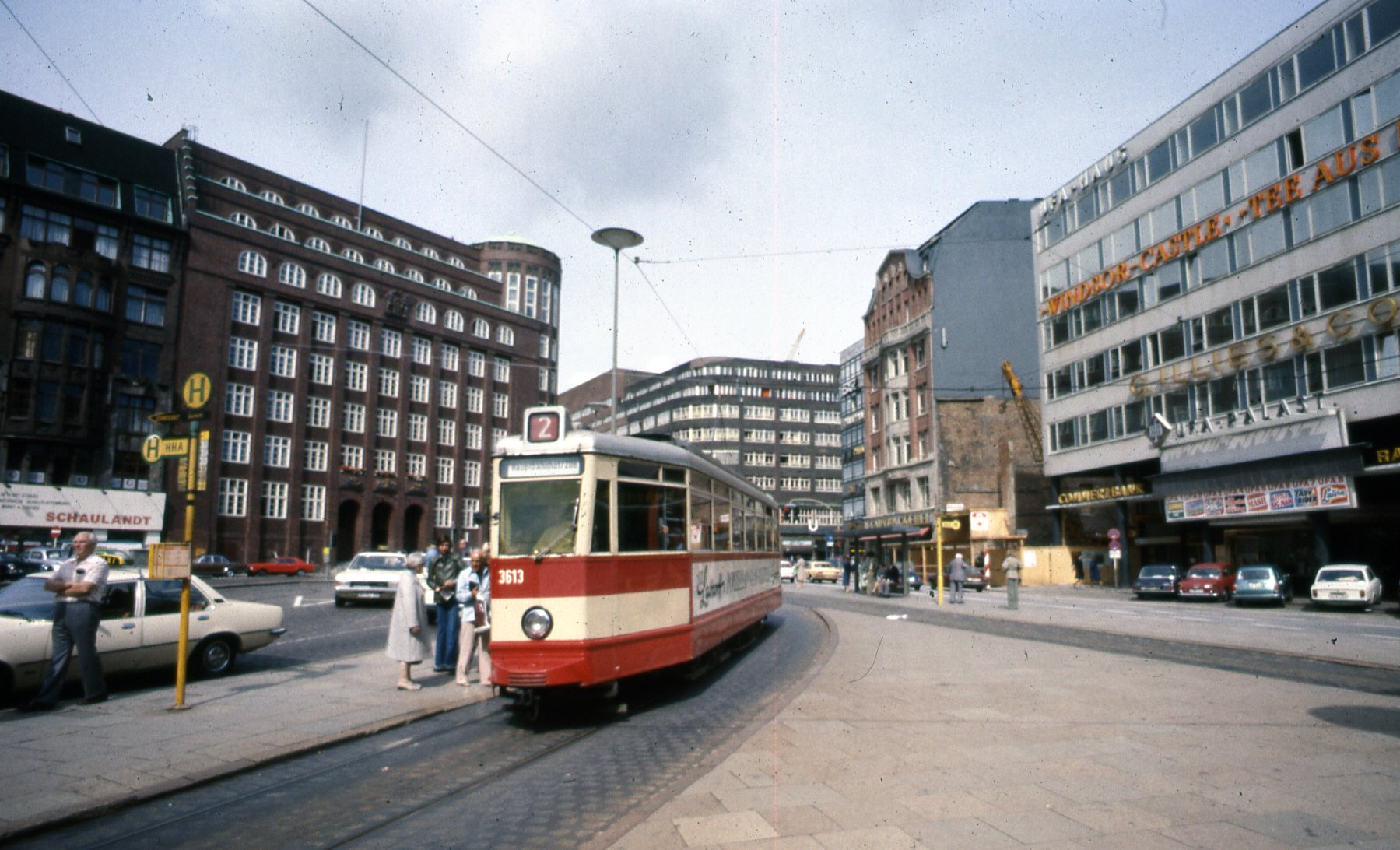
A Hamburg tram on Gänsemarkt in the 1970s, the Ufa-Palast cinema to the right

Gänsemarkt (lit. Geese Market) is a public square in Hamburg, Germany, located in the Neustadt quarter. The triangular urban square is accessible by streets of Jungfernstieg from the east, Dammtorstraße and Valentinskamp in the north west and ABC-Straße in the south.

== History ==
The opera building of Oper am Gänsemarkt at the square was used from 1678 to 1738. In 1765 the building was demolished and replaced by the Hamburg National Theatre, which had to close in 1769. The theatre employed Gotthold Ephraim Lessing as the world's first dramaturg. Today, the Hamburg State Opera is located a few metres north at Dammtorstraße.

Therefore, the Lessing Monument is located in the center of the square. It was created by Fritz Schaper and erected in 1881. On 18 June 1944 the monument was hit by a bomb and it fell from its pedestal. In 1955 it was erected again.

The Ufa-Palast, with a capacity of 2,667 once Europe's largest cinema, opened in December 1929 inside the building of Deutschlandhaus. It then also succeeded Berlin Ufa-Palast am Zoo as Germany's largest cinema. For a long time afterwards, it was also Hamburg's biggest cinema. The capacity of the cinema, which was damaged during World War II and later re-built at the northern edge of the Gänsemarkt square, had been risen to 3,200 in the 1980s. In 2006, the cinema was closed and the newer building was demolished, while the Deutschlandhaus still can be found near the square.

Today, the square is surrounded by shops, the shopping arcades of Gänsemarkt Passage and some restaurants. The U-Bahn station of Gänsemarkt (U2 line) is located right below the square.
