= Ohnsorg-Theater =

German theatre

Coordinates: 53°33′09″N 9°59′21″E

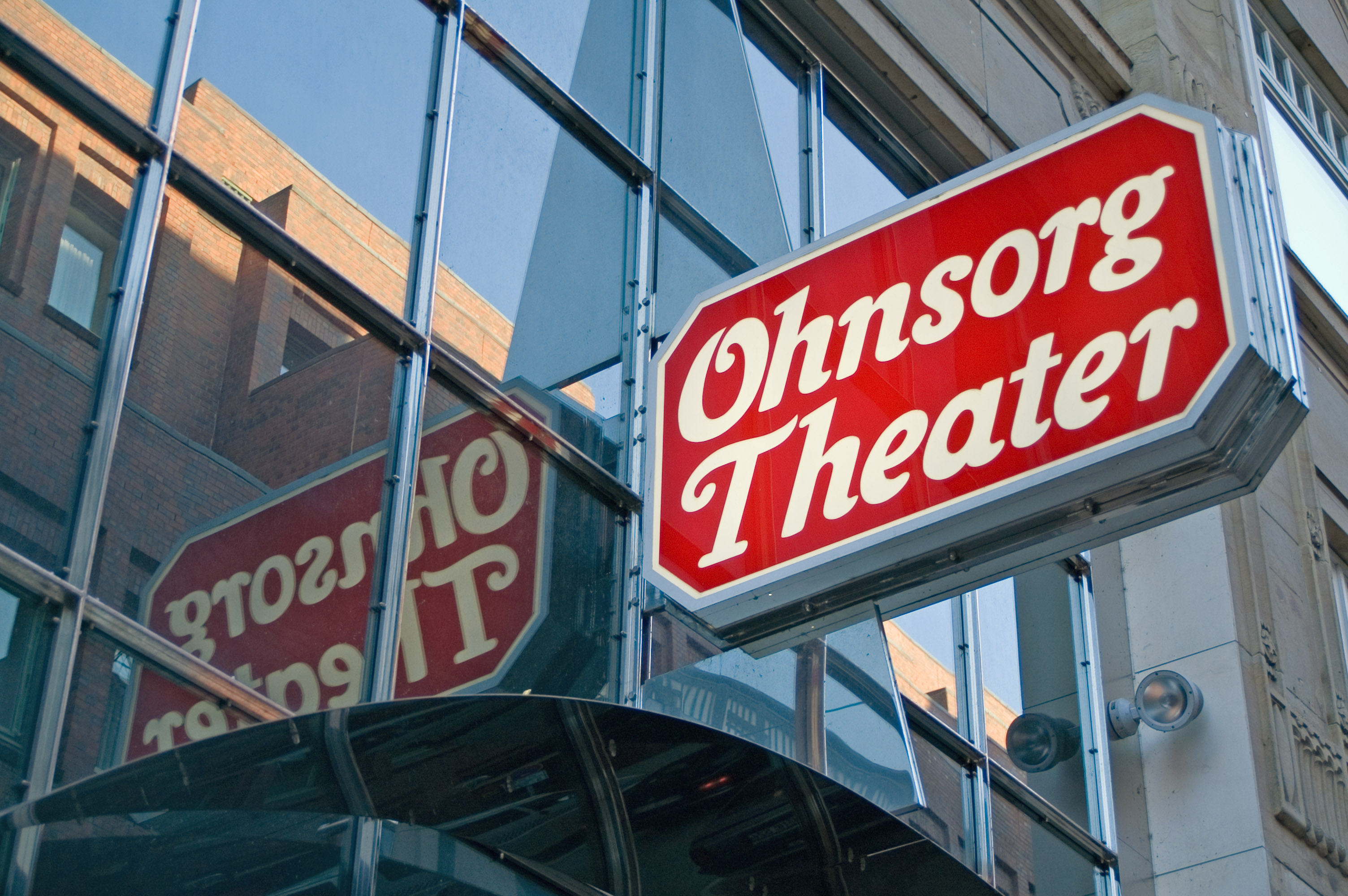
Ohnsorg-Theater on its former site at the Große Bleichen in Hamburg

The Ohnsorg-Theater in Hamburg, Germany, is a stage for plays run after the British system of repertory theatre with up to six produced plays per season. Plays are exclusively performed in Low German (Platt). They play a major role in spreading the knowledge and, in recent times, renewed appreciation of this minority language. Exceptions played in standard German (Hochdeutsch) are only made for television broadcasts. These broadcasts, by the regional Norddeutscher Rundfunk (NDR) and the nationwide ARD have made the theatre and its former main star Heidi Kabel popular across Germany and beyond.

The theatre is known for comedies, the majority of them set in the typical environment of Northern German farmers, fishermen and merchants. The theatre also performs serious works of traditional literature and musical theatre as well as adaptations in Platt of international material, such as the stage version of Stephen King's Misery and original plays such as Tennessee Williams's Cat on a Hot Tin Roof, Robert Thomas's 8 Women, Willy Russell's Shirley Valentine, Lawrence Roman's Alone Together and Shakespeare's A Midsummer Night's Dream.

== History ==
The theatre was founded by Richard Ohnsorg (1876–1947) in 1902 as Dramatische Gesellschaft Hamburg, with the stated purpose of providing a stage on which plays in Platt could be performed. This was often not possible in other theatres, since Platt was generally considered to be a sign of low social rank and rather boorish, despite the fact that Platt was also spoken in the wealthy and educated circles of Hamburg's merchants and shipowners.

Plays, some originally written in Platt, others translated from High German and other languages, were performed in cramped circumstances and various locations. In 1920, the theatre was renamed to Niederdeutsche Bühne Hamburg.

In 1936, the company moved into the former Kleine Lustspielhaus on the Große Bleichen. The Nazi regime was sympathetic to the company's aim to stimulate local culture; the brand comedy delivered by Ohnsorg and his company was popular. After the war, the theatre was renamed Richard Ohnsorg-Theater in 1946. Since 1954, its productions have been aired by NDR. Especially during the 1960s and 1970s, the theatre was popular due to its star Heidi Kabel who played until her retirement in 1997. The actor Folker Bohnet directed 17 productions, including some plays he had co-authored.

The theatre moved into a new larger playhouse in 2011, which was built in the listed Bieberhaus close to Deutsches Schauspielhaus and Hamburg Hauptbahnhof. Part of the square in front of the theatre was named after Kabel right before the theatre moved, and a monument in her honour was erected next to the theatre's entrance.
