= Krameramtsstuben =

Museum in Hamburg

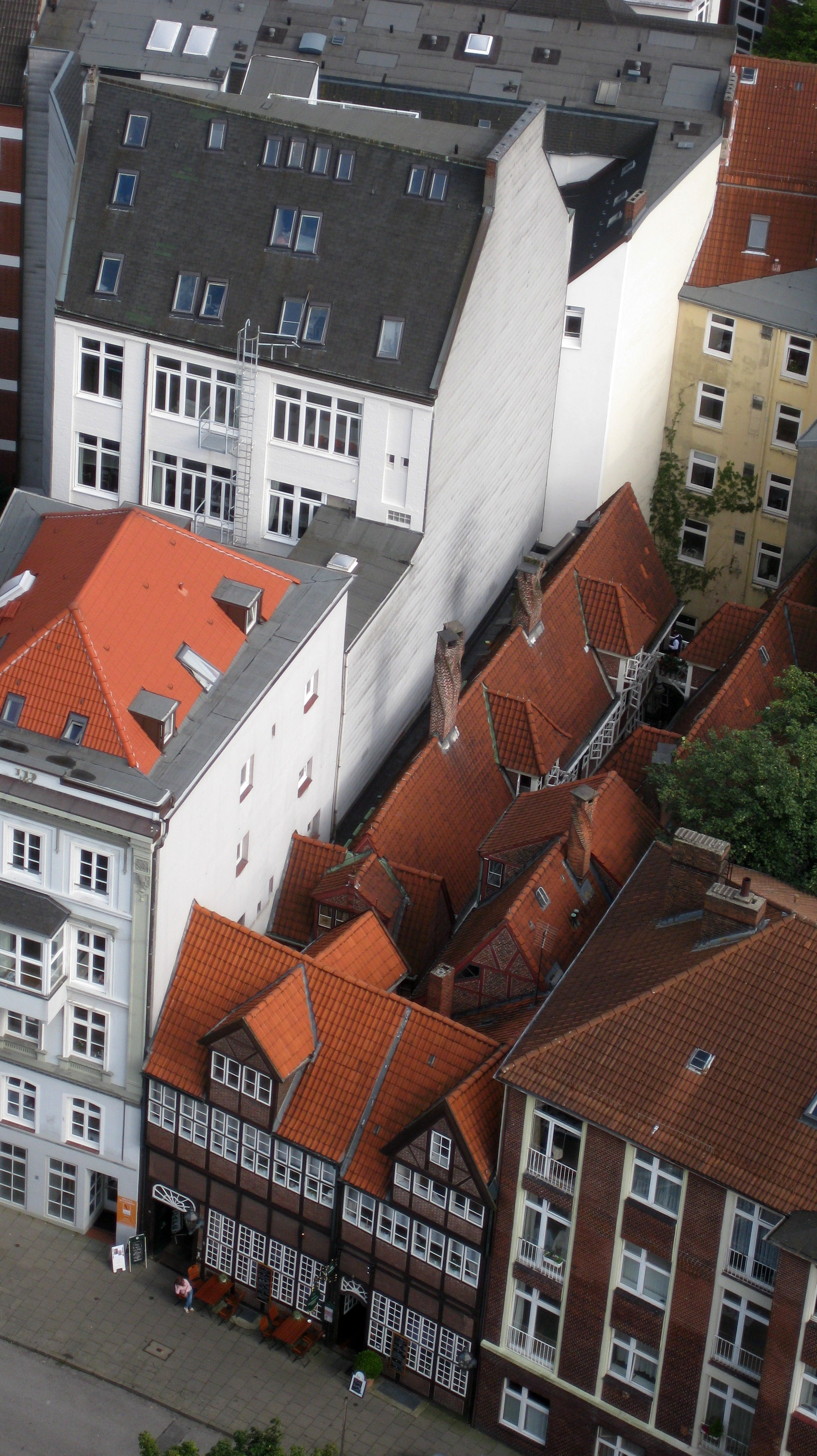
- The apartments from the tower of St. Michaelis, surrounded by taller buildings
- Interactive map of the Krameramtsstuben area

General information
- Location: Krayenkamp, Neustadt, Hamburg, Germany
- Coordinates: 53°32′53″N 9°58′49″E
- Completed: 17th century

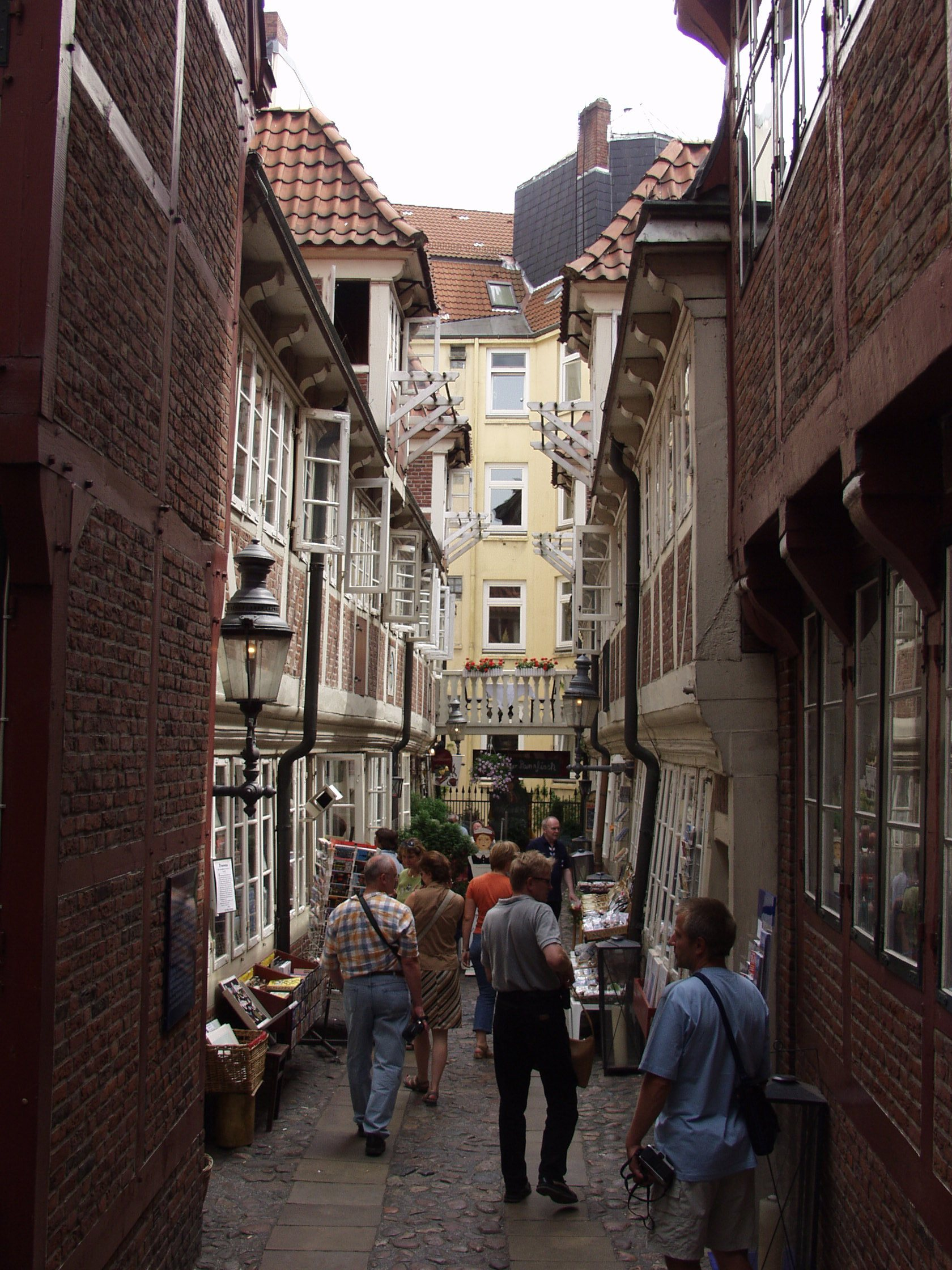
View from the yard

The Krameramtsstuben (Grocers' Apartments) are historic buildings on Krayenkamp, near St. Michaelis Church in the Neustadt district of Hamburg, Germany.

Formerly homes for widows of members of the Grocers’ Institute (Krameramtswohnungen), the 1620 to 1700 built, timber-framed buildings form the last of the 17th century enclosed courtyards of Hamburg. Now occupied by small shops, galleries, restaurants and a museum, the group is arranged along the sides of a narrow courtyard, behind two 1700s buildings which front the street.

== History and architecture ==
The oldest houses in the system (Krayenkamp 10/11 – houses a, n and m) are also the oldest surviving residential buildings in central Hamburg. With cantilevered floors and ornamental cut cleats, they were built around 1620 (Rear houses 1615–20; Vorderhaus 1625) as a country house and summerhouse on what were otherwise ornamental and pleasure gardens. Their exposed 17th century ceiling paintings are evidence that the original owners were members of the upper class. At the time, Neustadt had just been included within the fortified ramparts of Hamburg.

In 1676 the wealthy and prestigious Grocers’ Institute (Krameramt; formed in 1375 to offer guild-like protection to merchants), purchased the grounds and erected 20 apartments for the widows of deceased members, to encourage them to vacate their shops in favour of new members. In addition to the rent-free apartments, the widows were given fuel and a modest pension. The buildings have twisted brick chimneys and characteristic wooden racks for drying laundry outside the windows.

The institute was dissolved in 1866. Having previously used wells in the courtyard, the homes were finally supplied with mains water in 1900.

In 1933, the buildings were made subject to a preservation order, and they survived the bombing raids of World War II without major damage. From 1972 to 1974, a $1.6 million Deutschmark renovation project was undertaken.

== Museum ==
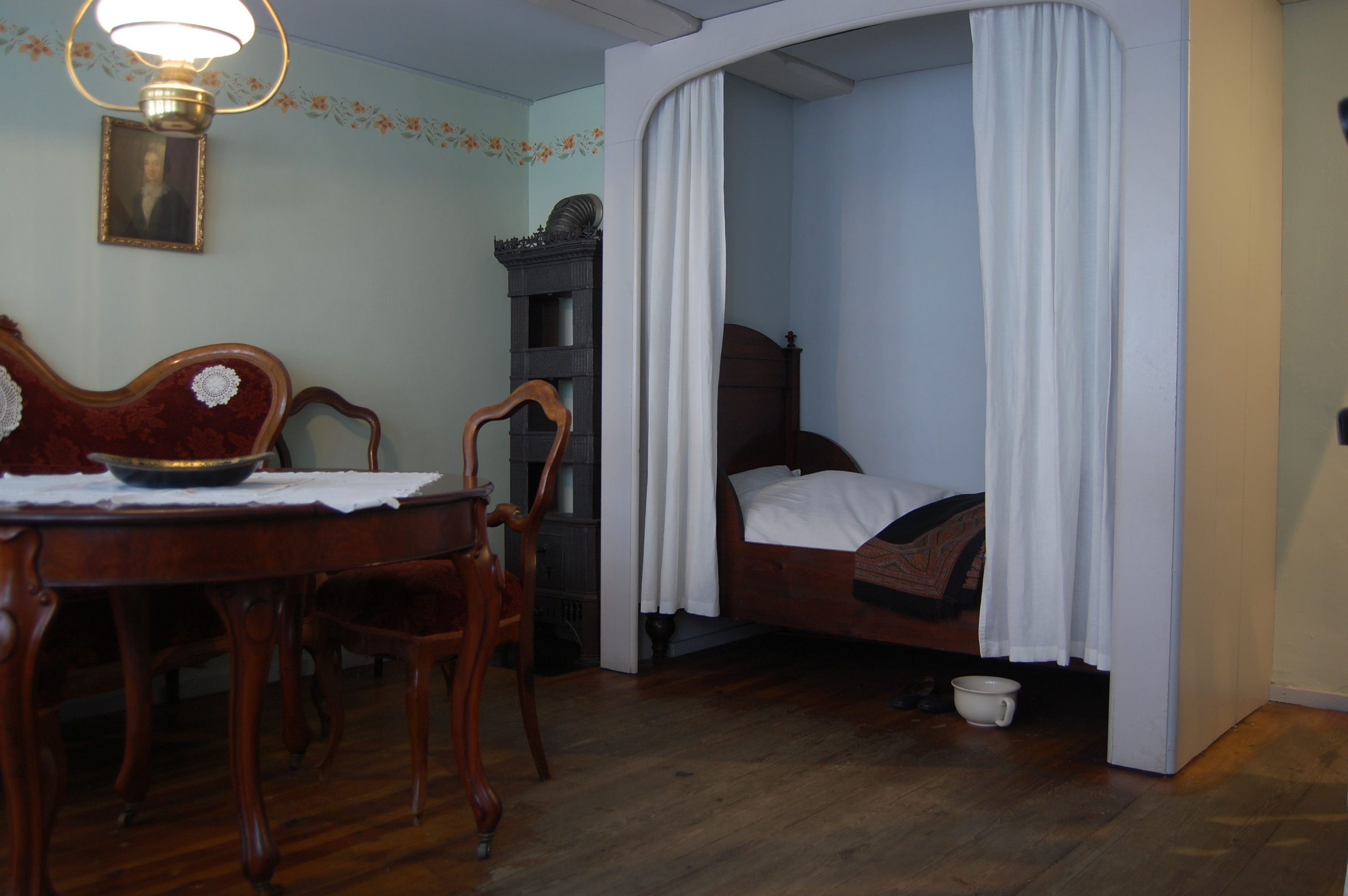
Interior of first floor room of the museum, showing sofa, table, heater and bed

One of the old apartments is preserved as a museum, a branch of the Hamburg Museum. It has been furnished in 1850s style to illustrate the living conditions of the apartments' middle class residents.

A set of balance scales and an ell (a cubit-long measuring stick) from the year 1800, the most important instruments of the Kramer are also on display; both feature in the grocers' guild sign.
