= List of theatres in Hamburg =

This is a list of theatres and stages in Hamburg.

The city of Hamburg, Germany, is home to several theatres, stages and related cultural institutions and entertainment venues. In 2009, 31 theatres, 6 music halls, and 10 cabarets were located in Hamburg proper. This list contains the most famous or well-regarded organizations.

== Theatres and stages ==
=== Theatres ===
In 2005/6, 4.2 mil. visits to a theatre were counted in Hamburg, 2,380 visits per 1000 inhabitants, so Hamburg had more visits than Bremen (920) and Berlin (920). The average for the German states was 420 visits.

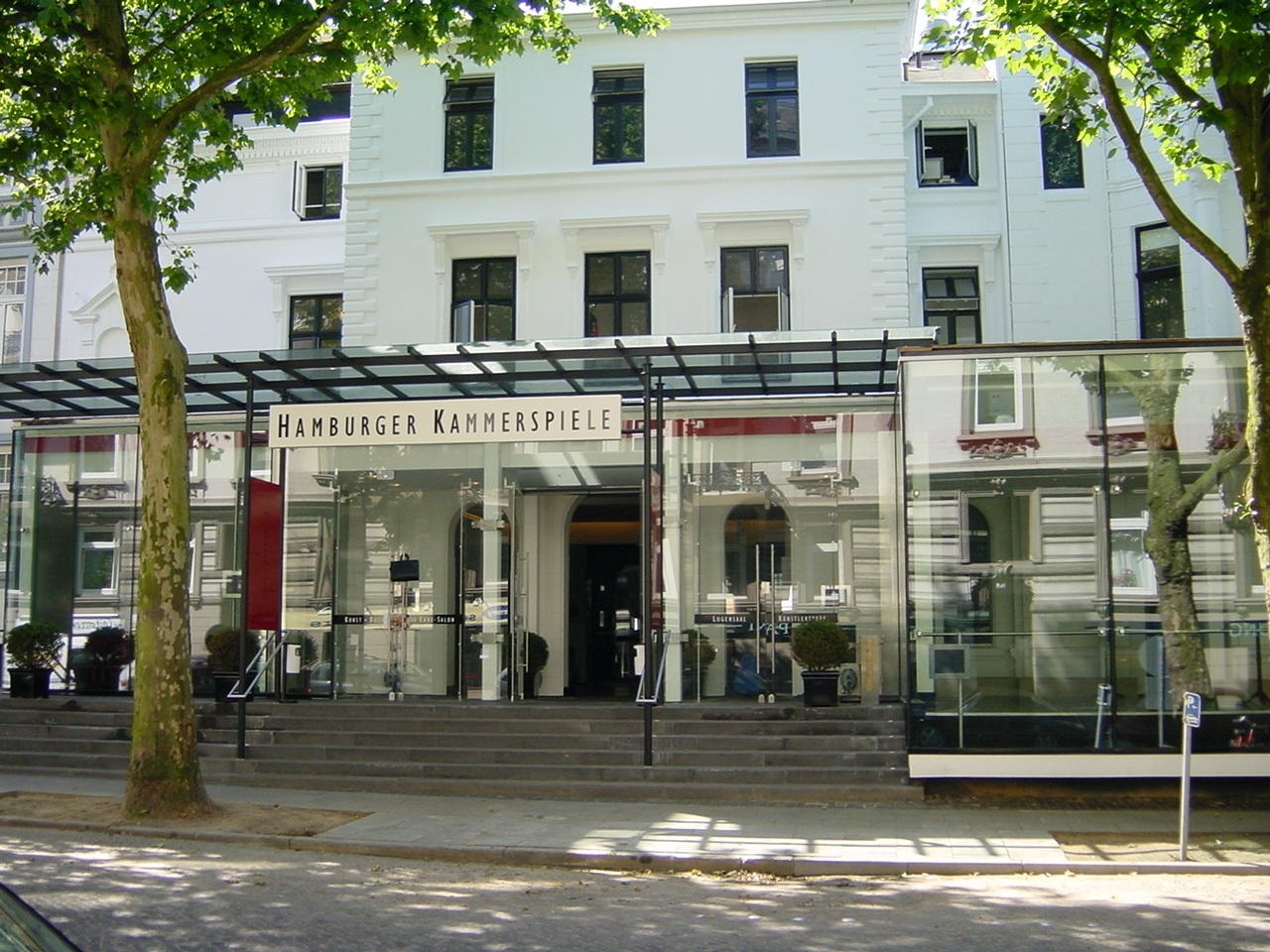
Hamburger Kammerspiele, front view in 2005

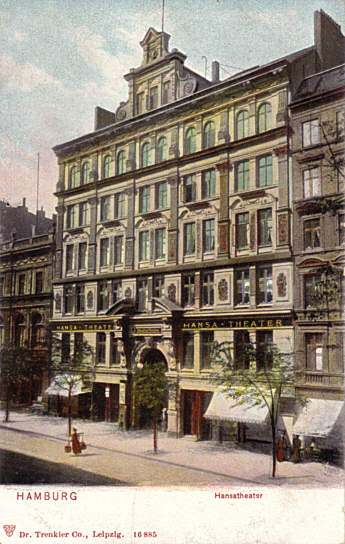
Postcard of the Hansa-Theater in 1900[?]

State owned theatres.

| German name | Description | Date (Note: Creation or opening date. If two dates are given the first date is for a preceding organisation or institution.) | Location (Note: Borough or quarter in Hamburg proper (Street if article existing).) | Notes | Website |
|---|---|---|---|---|---|
| Altonaer Theater | | | | | |
| DAS SCHIFF | Theatre ship | 1975 | | | (in German) |
| Deutsches Schauspielhaus | | | St. Georg | | |
| English Theatre | | 1976 | | | (in English) |
| Ernst-Deutsch-Theater | | 1951 (1973) | | | (in German) |
| Hamburger Kammerspiele | | 1918 | | | (in German) |
| Hansa-Theater | Vaudeville theatre, with acts from Josephine Baker (in 1930) and Siegfried & Roy (in 1964). Closed 2001–2009. | 1894 | St. Georg | | (in German) |
| Imperial Theater | Theatre playing detective fiction | 1994 | St. Pauli; Reeperbahn | | (in German) |
| Kabarett Mon Marthe | Defunct theatre group | | | | |
| Kampnagel-Fabrik | | | | | |
| Komödie Winterhuder Fährhaus | Comedy | 1854; 1988 | Winterhude | | (in German) |
| Monsun Theater | Theatre for children | | | | |
| Neues Theater am Holstenwall | | | | | |
| Ohnsorg-Theater | A theatre in which the actors speak Low Saxon (but they speak Missingsch-infused German for national television broadcasts, since Low Saxon is not comprehensible to most German speakers) | 1902 | | | (in German) |
| Opernloft | | | | | |
| Rote Flora | | 1888–1953[?] | | Closed | |
| Schilleroper | | | | Closed | |
| Theater an der Marschnerstrasse | Amateur theatre | 1956- | Marschnerstrasse | | (in German) |
| Theater Allee | | | | | |
| Theater für Kinder | Theatre for children | | | | |
| Theater Imago | | | | | |
| Theater im Zimmer | | 1948–1999 | | Closed | |
| Theater in der Basilika | | | | | |
| Theater Istasyon | Bilingual Turkish theatre | 1989 | | | (in Turkish) |
| Theater Mär | | | | | |
| Theater Schachar | Private Jewish theatre | 1998 | 2004 | | |
| Thalia Theater | | 1843 | | | (in German) |
| Thalia Gaußstraße | | 2000 | | | (in German) |
| Schilleroper | | 1891 | | Closed | |
| Schmidt Theater | | 1988 | St. Pauli; Reeperbahn | | (in German) |
| Schmidts Tivoli | | 1991 | St. Pauli; Reeperbahn | | (in German) |
| St. Pauli Theater | | 1841 | St. Pauli; Reeperbahn | | (in German) |

=== Stages ===
State owned

| German name | Description | Date | Location | Notes | Website |
|---|---|---|---|---|---|
| Hamburgische Staatsoper | Opera | | | | |
| Beatlemania Hamburg | Devoted to The Beatles | 2009 | St. Pauli | | (in English) |
| Elbphilharmonie | Philharmonic hall | 2017 | HafenCity | | |
| Laeiszhalle | Philharmonic hall and concerts of popular music | | | | |
| Neue Flora | Musicals | 1990 | | | (in German) |
| Operettenhaus (TUI Operettenhaus) | Musicals | | St. Pauli; Reeperbahn | | (in German) |
| Theater im Hafen Hamburg | Musicals | | | | (in German) |

== See also ==
- List of castles in Hamburg
- List of churches in Hamburg
