= Biermann-Ratjen-Medaille =

German award

The Biermann-Ratjen-Medaille (Biermann Ratjen Medal) was an award of the City of Hamburg, Germany. It was founded in 1978 by the Senate of the Free and Hanseatic City of Hamburg to commemorate the achievements of the previous senator of culture Hans-Harder Biermann-Ratjen. The award was given to people, groups and institutions who have made outstanding contributions to the culture of Hamburg. The Praeses of the Department of Culture decides on the recipients and awards the medal on behalf of the Senate.

== Previous winners ==
- 1978: Horst Janssen, Elsbeth Weichmann (politician), Boy Gobert (actor), Heinrich Maria Ledig-Rowohlt (editor), Hans Leip (writer), Altonaer Singakademie, Griffelkunst Vereinigung
- 1979: no award
- 1980: Martin Beheim-Schwarzbach (writer), Altonaer Theater
- 1981: Willem Grimm (painter), Ernst Hauswedell, Fritz Kempe (photographer), Rudolf Joerden (director of public libraries), Marie Friedrich (librarian)
- 1982: Rosemarie Clausen (photographer of theatre), Arie Goral-Sternheim (writer), Rudolf Nicolussi (librarian)
- 1983: Gerda Gmelin (actress), Lola Rogge (dancer)
- 1984: Wilhelm Brückner-Rüggeberg (conductor)
- 1985: Heidi Kabel (actress), Arnold Fiedler (painter), Karl August Ohrt (sculptor), Kurt Collien (St. Pauli-Theater), Sibylle Niester (president of GEDOK), Jürgen Jürgens (conductor of the Monteverdi-Chor), Otto Rohse (illustrator)
- 1986: Bergedorfer Kammerchor, Hans Kock (sculptor and painter), Thomas Peiter (painter and graphic artist), Dieter Schmeel (church musician), René Drommert (journalist)
- 1987: Kurt Kranz (Hochschule für bildende Künste), Manfred Steffen (actor)
- 1988: Herbert Joost (patron), Heidi Oetinger (editor), Hans Drescher (scientist)
- 1989: Lotar Olias (composer), Felicitas Kukuck (composer)
- 1990: Richard Germer (composer and singer)
- 1991: Peter Hinrichs (Hamburger Symphoniker), F.C. Gandlach (photographer and gallerist)
- 1992: Albert Feser (painter and educator), Herbert Schemmel (president of Amicale Internationale de Neuengamme)
- 1993: Ernst Schönfelder (director of Philharmonic Orchestra)
- 1994: Ernst Bader (actor), Eliza Hansen (pianist and harpsichordist), Brigitte Klosowski (juweler), Karel Trinkewitz (writer), Esther Béjarano (singer)
- 1995: Michael Hauptmann (gallerist), Geno Hartlaub (writer), Hildburg Frese (actress), Christa Möbius and Eberhard Möbius (cabaretists)
- 1996: Ingeborg Hecht-Studniczka (writer and journalist), Freddy Quinn (singer), Annemarie Marks-Rocke (actress)
- 1997: Nana Gualdi (singer), Wolfgang Borchert (founder of Junges Theater Hamburg – later Ernst Deutsch Theater), Günter Seggermann (organist and cantor), Gudrun Piper (painter) and Max Hermann Mahlmann (painter)
- 1998: Peggy Parnass (journalist), Günter Harte (linguist) Werner Burkhardt (journalist), Werner Krützfeldt (music educator)
- 1999: no award
- 2000: Telse Grell (director of Hansa-Theater), Erich Grandeit (scenic designer), Günter Discher (collector), Peter Dannenberg (Intendant of the Hamburger Symphoniker), Renata Klée Gobert (conservationist), Hans-Dieter Loose (former president of Stiftung Denkmalpflege), Hilde Sicks (actress)
- 2001: Michael Collien (director of St. Pauli-Theater), Günter Fuhlisch (trombonist), Gert Westphal (actor and speaker), Hannelore Hoger (actress and stage director), John-Erik Berganus (patron), Rolf Mares (cultural politician)
- 2002: Will Baumgarten (patrons of archeology and the Helms Museum) Gisela Trowe (actress), Rolf Mares (director of Deutsches Schauspielhaus, Thalia Theater, Hamburgische Staatsoper, Komödie Winterhuder Fährhaus)
- 2003: Uwe Friedrichsen (actor), Robert Stehli (conductor), Edgar Bessen (actor), Hans-Werner Funke (concert manager)
- 2004: Arno Surminski (writer and journalist)
- 2005: Joop van den Ende (producer of musical and theatre)
- 2006: Werner Grassmann (founder of cinema Abaton)
- 2007: Claus Bantzer (composer and church musician), Karsten Jahnke (concert manager)
- 2008: Gert Hinnerk Behlmer (Staatsrat)
- 2008: Jürgen Blankenburg (president of Kuratoriums der Stiftung für die Hamburger Kunstsammlungen)
- 2009: Barbara Hass and Uwe Deeken (founder of the chamber opera Allee-Theater), Henning Venske (actor), Gothart Stier (conductor of Monteverdi-Chor), Günter and Lieselotte Powalla (patrons)
- 2010: Hans Scheibner (cabarettist), Heinz Glüsing (painter)
- 2011: Max Pommer (conductor of Hamburger Camerata) and Gerhard Hirschfeld (architect)
- 2012: no award
- 2013: Uta Falter-Baumgarten (sculptor), Renate Kammer (galerist), Norbert Aust (cultural manager, Managing Director of the Schmidt Theater)
- 2014: Hanne Mogler (Principal of the theater "fools garden"), Michael Batz (author, dramaturge, director and light artist), Volker Lechtenbrink (actor, director, singer, author), Joachim Kaiser (Board of Directors Foundation Hamburg Maritim)
- 2015: Heidi Mahler (actor)
- 2016: Klaus Francke (politician, monument protector, Rettet die Deichstraße e.V., Förderkreis Mahnmal St. Nikolai e.V.)
- 2017: Elke Dröscher (monument protector and operator of the doll museum Falkenstein), Christian Seeler (intendant of the Ohnsorg-Theater until 2017), Jutta Heinrich (author), Hans-Michael Bock (filmhistorian and publicist, CineGraph),
- 2018: Rudolf Kelber (cantor and organist, Kirchenmusikdirektor St. Jacobi)
- 2019: Hella Schwemer-Martienßen (direktor of the foundation Hamburger Öffentliche Bücherhallen)
- 2020: Albert Wiederspiel (head of Filmfest Hamburg)
- 2022: Stephan von Löwis of Menar (founder of KinderKinder e.V. Hamburg)
- 2023: Anke Feuchtenberger (artist and cartoonist)
- 2024: Frank Göhre (crime writer)
