= Tanneberger =

Tanneberger may refer to:

- André Tanneberger (born 1973), birth name of "ATB", German DJ, musician, and producer
- Marcus Tanneberger (born 1987), German violinist
- Stephan Tanneberger (1935–2018), German oncologist and chemist

== See also ==
- Tannenberg (disambiguation)
- Danneberg
- Dannenberg (disambiguation)
