= Tannenberg =

Tannenberg may refer to

== Places ==
- Tannenberg, Saxony, a town in the district of Annaberg in the German state of Saxony
- Tannenberg, East Prussia, modern Stębark in the Warmian-Masurian Voivodeship, Poland

== People ==
- David Tannenberg, a Moravian organ builder

== Middle Ages ==
- Battle of Tannenberg (1410) or Battle of Grunwald

== First World War ==
- Battle of Tannenberg (1914) in World War I
- Tannenberg Memorial, commemorating the World War I battle
- Tannenberg (video game), a first-person computer game set in WW1

== Inter-war period ==
- Tannenbergbund, a far right German political society founded by the German Army general Erich Ludendorff in 1925
- Tannenberg (film), a 1932 Swiss-German War film
- Tannenberg (typeface), a Fraktur-family sans-serif type face designed in 1934

== Second World War ==
- Operation Tannenberg, codename of an extermination action directed at the Polish people during World War II
- Tannenberg (minelayer), a World War II era German minelayer converted from civilian vessel, see List of World War II ships
- V 303 Tannenberg, a World War II vorpostenboot, served as a civilian fishing trawler pre- and post-war
- Führerhauptquartier Tannenberg, a Führer Headquarters
- Battle of Tannenberg Line in World War II, fought in 1944 in Estonia

== See also ==
- Danneberg
- Dannenberg (disambiguation)
- Tanneberger
