= Dannenberg (surname) =

Dannenberg is a surname. Notable people with the surname include:

- Alice Dannenberg (1861–1948), Russian-born French painter
- Andrew Jess Dannenberg (born 1956), American physician
- Konrad Dannenberg (1912–2009), German-American engineer
- Martin Dannenberg (1915–2010), American insurance executive
- Peter Dannenberg (1930–2015), German musicologist, music writer and opera director
- Peter Andreivich Dannenberg (1792–1872), Russian general

== See also ==
- Danneberg
