= Pelsin =

- Ortsteil of Anklam
- Interactive map of Pelsin
- Location within Germany Location within Mecklenburg-Vorpommern
- Coordinates: 53°49′N 13°41′E
- Country: Germany
- State: Mecklenburg-Vorpommern
- District: Vorpommern-Greifswald
- Town: Anklam

Area
  - Total: 14.92 km^{2} (5.76 sq mi)
- Elevation: 4 m (13 ft)

Population (2006-12-31)
  - Total: 316
  - Density: 21.2/km^{2} (54.9/sq mi)
- Time zone: UTC+01:00 (CET)
  - Summer (DST): UTC+02:00 (CEST)
- Postal codes: 17392
- Dialling codes: 039722
- Vehicle registration: OVP
- Website: www.amt-anklam-land.de

Pelsin is a village and a former municipality in the Vorpommern-Greifswald district, in Mecklenburg-Vorpommern, Germany. Since 1 January 2010, it is part of the town Anklam.

== History ==
From 1648 to 1720, Pelsin was part of Swedish Pomerania. From 1720 to 1945, it was part of the Prussian Province of Pomerania, from 1945 to 1952 of the State of Mecklenburg-Vorpommern, from 1952 to 1990 of the Bezirk Neubrandenburg of East Germany and since 1990 again of Mecklenburg-Vorpommern.
