= Corny Littmann =

German entrepreneur and entertainer

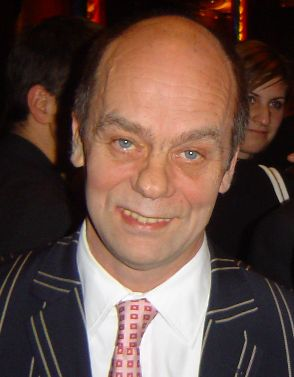
Corny Littmann.

Cornelius "Corny" Littmann (born 21 November 1952) is a German entrepreneur, entertainer, theater owner (Schmidt Theater). He served as President (2002–2010) of the football club FC St. Pauli.

== Biography ==
Littmann toured throughout West Germany for years with the "Familie Schmidt" theatre group before setting up the "Schmidt Theater" in Hamburg's St. Pauli in 1988. He is the managing director of two theatres – with the opening of the "Schmidt's Tivoli" theatre in 1991. In 1999, he was named "Hamburg Entrepreneur of the Year".
