= Dietrich Henschel =

German baritone (born 1967)

Dietrich Henschel (born 1967) is a German baritone.

== Life and career ==
Born in Berlin, Henschel grew up in Nürnberg where he attended high school and studied piano and conducting. He studied voice at the Musikhochschule München and made his stage debut at the 1990 Munich Biennale in Michèle Reverdy's Le Précepteur.

He made guest appearances in several opera houses and music festivals such as the Schubertiade in Vienna and Feldkirch, the Schleswig-Holstein Musik Festival and the Beethovenfest of Bonn. After this, from 1993 to 1995 he was an ensemble member of the Theater Kiel. Under director Peter Dannenberg and musical director Klaus Peter Seibel, he performed in many operas by Mozart, Monteverdi and Gluck.

After working in Bonn and Stuttgart, in 1997, Henschel's international career began when he took on the title role in Henze's Der Prinz von Homburg at the Deutsche Oper Berlin under Götz Friedrich and Busoni's Doktor Faust with the Opéra National de Lyon under Kent Nagano. This was followed by engagements at the Théâtre du Châtelet and the Opéra Bastille in Paris, the Nederlandse Opera Amsterdam, the Opera de Genève, the Maggio Musicale Fiorentino, the Cologne Opera, the Zürich Opera House and the Komische Oper in Berlin.

In addition, Henschel has also made a name as a song interpreter. The focus of his repertoire has been the works of Ludwig van Beethoven and Franz Schubert, along with Hugo Wolf, Gustav Mahler and Erich Wolfgang Korngold. He has performed with Irwin Gage, Fritz Schwinghammer, Helmut Deutsch, Leonard Hokanson and Shinya Okahara: since 1996 he has regularly toured Japan with Okahara. He has made numerous recordings on CD, including with the Freiburg Baroque Orchestra under René Jacobs, Bach's St Matthew Passion with the Concentus Musicus Wien, under Nikolaus Harnoncourt, and the recording of Busoni's Doktor Faust, which in 2001 won a Grammy Award for Best Opera Recording.
