= Gothart Stier =

German singer and church musician (1938–2023)

Gothart Stier (27 June 1938 – 2 March 2023) was a German Lied and oratorio singer and church musician.

== Life ==
Born in Magdeburg, Stier received his first musical training in the Stadtsingechor zu Halle, which he belonged to until his Abitur. He studied conducting and church music at the University of Music and Theatre Leipzig and completed his studies with the A exam. He also trained as a concert singer through private singing lessons.

From 1963 to 1991, Stier was cantor and organist at the Friedenskirche in Gohlis. At the same time, he worked as a concert and oratorio singer at home and abroad. Radio, television and recordings with works from Schütz to Schönberg and Theodorakis document his versatile repertoire.

After the death of Karl Richter, Stier conducted the Münchener Bach-Chor and the Munich Bach Orchestra from 1983 to 1984. He was also a guest conductor with numerous German Rundfunkchor. In 1991, Stier was appointed to Dresden as the 27th Kreuzkantor. In this post, he directed the Dresdner Kreuzchor until 1994. In 1994, he succeeded Jürgen Jürgens as artistic director of the Monteverdi-Chor Hamburg. From 1995 to 2011, he was also the artistic director of the Robert-Franz-Singakademie. From 2003 to 2006, in addition to his work in Hamburg and Halle (Saale), Stier took over the artistic direction of the Stadtsingechor zu Halle.

== Honours ==
- 2009: Biermann-Ratjen-Medaille
