= Stephan Tanneberger =

German chemist (1935–2018)

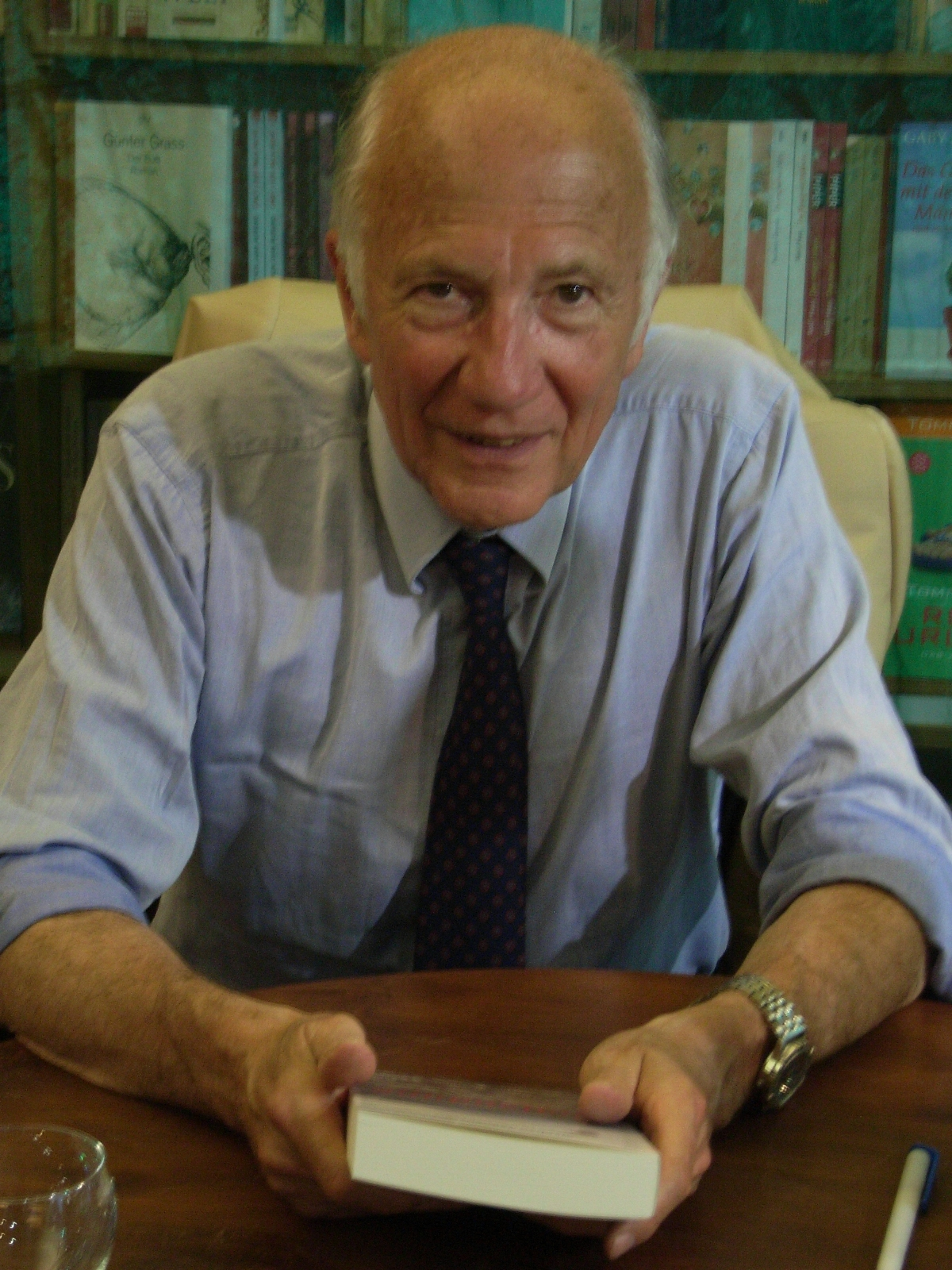
Stephan Tanneberger, 2010

Stephan Tanneberger (December 27, 1935 – March 5, 2018) was a German oncologist and chemist who held leading positions in cancer research and therapy in the German Democratic Republic (GDR), serving as director of the Zentralinstitut für Krebsforschung (Central Institute of Cancer Research) of the Akademie der Wissenschaften der DDR (Academy of Sciences of the German Democratic Republic) from 1974 until 1990. He left Germany in 1991 to work in the field of palliative care for cancer patients in Italy as well as in various countries in the Third World. In 2005, he founded a Center for Peace Work in Anklam in northeast Germany.

== Career ==
Stephan Tanneberger was born in 1935 in Chemnitz and enrolled in medicine and chemistry at the University of Leipzig in 1954, where he obtained his Ph.D. in 1961 and his M.D. in 1964 as well as his Habilitation in 1970. In 1971, he took up a position as senior physician at the Zentralinstitut für Krebsforschung of the Akademie der Wissenschaften der DDR in Berlin-Buch where he was promoted to chief physician in 1972 and to deputy director in 1973. Following the death of the institute's founding director Hans Gummel in May 1973, he was appointed Professor of Clinical and Experimental Cancer Biology by the Academy of Sciences and named director of the institute in 1974. He served in his position and led the national program for cancer research and control of the GDR until January 1990. From the beginning of 1989, he was also chairman of the Zentrum für Medizinische Wissenschaft (Center for Medical Sciences) of the Academy of Sciences which coordinated the activities of all medical institutes of the academy.

After the German reunification in 1990, Tanneberger left Germany and worked as consultant for the World Health Organization in various third world countries, among them Bangladesh, India, North Korea and Albania. In 1993, he took up the position as head of quality control for Associazione Nazionale Tumori (ANT), an Italian organization which focuses on palliative care for cancer patients in their respective domestic environment as well as on cancer prevention. One year later, he became Secretary-General of ANT International and in 2000 scientific director of Instituto ANT. Additionally, he is professor with teaching assignment at the University of Bologna since 1992. He also directs a program of the European School of Oncology aimed at improving education and information exchange in the field of cancer control in Armenia, Azerbaijan, Moldova, Georgia, Romania and Ukraine since 2005 and the Euro-Arab School of Oncology since 2008.

Tanneberger has published several books about his experience regarding treatment of cancer and care for terminally ill patients. In addition to his medical activities, he is also active in the field of peace work. In 2004, he launched the foundation Zentrum für Friedensarbeit - Otto Lilienthal - Hansestadt Anklam (Center for Peace Work) in Anklam in northeast Germany. Since then, he acts as chairman of the foundation's executive board and is involved with the restoration of a former Wehrmacht prison in Anklam as well as with the project Wald für Frieden und gegen Klimawandel (Forest for Peace and against Climate Change) which is part of the Billion Tree Campaign of the United Nations Environment Programme (UNEP).

Tanneberger was married from 1970 until 2000 and is the father of a son and two daughters. He died of cancer in 2018.

== Awards and distinctions ==
In recognition of his work, Tanneberger received numerous national and international awards and distinctions. In 1986, he was awarded the honorary title Verdienter Wissenschaftler des Volkes (Merited Scientist of the GDR). The Academy of Sciences of the GDR made him a corresponding member in 1981 and an ordinary member in 1989. In March 2012, he received the Sigillo d'argento (Silver Seal) of the University of Bologna.

== Selected publications ==
- The Control of Tumour Growth and its Biological Bases. Boston and Den Haag, 1983
- Cancer In Developing Countries: The Great Challenge For Oncology In The 21st Century. Munich, 2004
- Cancer Medicine At The Dawn Of The 21st Century. Bologna, 2006
- ESMO Handbook of Advanced Cancer Care. London and New York, 2006
