= Wehrmacht prison Anklam =

Military prison in Nazi Germany

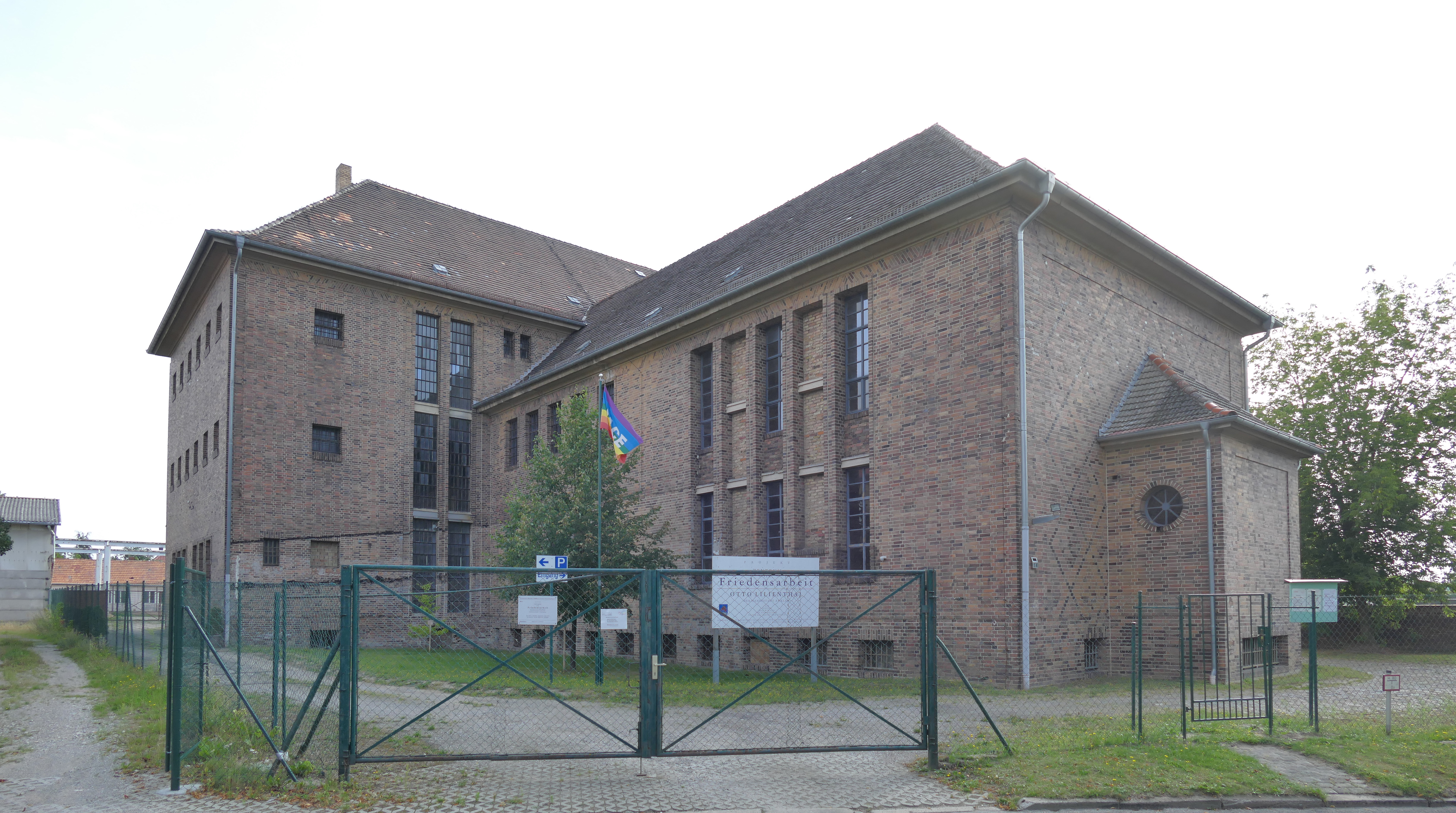
- Former Wehrmacht prison in Anklam
- Interactive map of Wehrmacht prison Anklam
- Location: Anklam, Germany; 53°50′54″N 13°41′14″E
- Status: Closed
- Capacity: 600
- Population: 1,500 (1945)
- Opened: 1940
- Closed: 28 April 1945
- Managed by: Wehrmacht

The Wehrmacht prison Anklam was one of eight military prisons of the Wehrmacht (armed forces) in Nazi Germany. The listed building is located west of the Friedlander Straße in the southern part of Anklam. Since 2005 it has been the seat of the foundation, "Center for Peace Work - Otto Lilienthal - Hanseatic City of Anklam". It serves as an educational resource center and a memorial to victims of the Nazi military justice system during 1933-1945.

== History ==
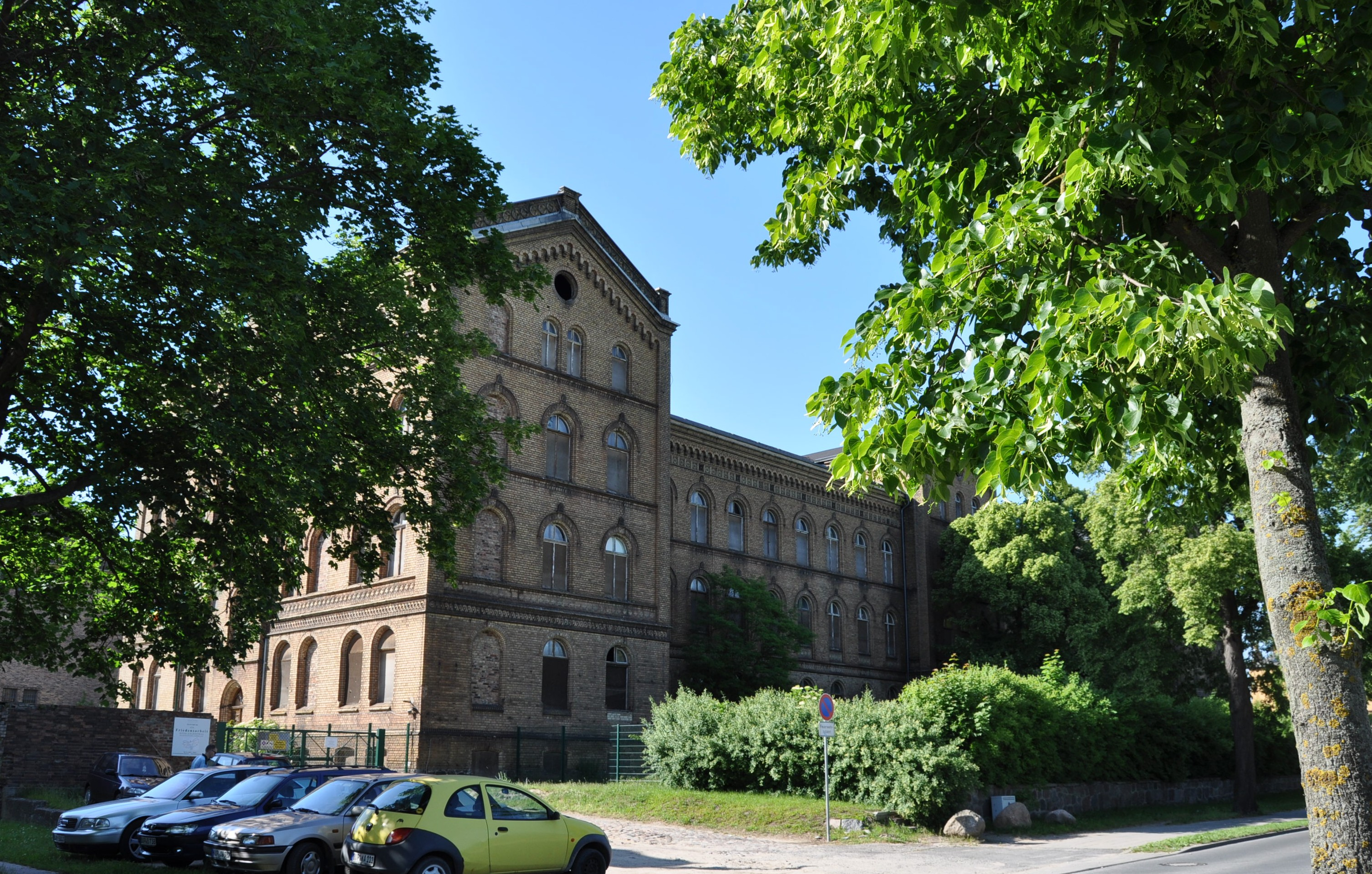
Former Military Academy, which was the location of the administration for the Wehrmacht prison Anklam

The prison, which was designed for 600 prisoners, was built during 1939-1940 in the yard of the Anklam military academy. There were both group and individual cells. In the basement of the southern wing was the death row, consisting of 19 cells. The administrative offices were in the adjacent military school in which the court officers were housed.

The prisoners were convicted by military courts of the military districts I (Königsberg), II (Stettin), and XX (Danzig), the Marineoberkommando (MOK) Baltic Sea Naval forces, and Luftwaffe Field Divisions I and XI. The jurisdiction also extended to Army Group North and the Heer (field army) in Scandinavia and northern and eastern Europe. Convictions resulted from both military (e.g. desertion, sedition, unlawful removal, cowardice before the enemy or insubordination) and criminal offenses.

The first prisoners arrived late in 1940 and continued to arrive until 1945. Several thousand convicts passed through the prison. Some of them were used for work details in armament factories such as the Arado aircraft factory in Anklam. At times, the prison, with up to 1,500 prisoners, was overcrowded and the confinement conditions for the prisoners deteriorated. In 1944 several hundred inmates were transferred to the SS-Sonderregiment Dirlewanger in order to reinforced its two battalion that had halt operation since 8 August 1944, which was used for the suppression of the Warsaw Uprising.

Executions of at least 139 condemned prisoners occurred from November 5, 1941 until April 26, 1945. Approximately 100 of the executions occurred during the period from January to April 1945. About 120 clemency requests to death sentences were granted.

The evacuation of the Wehrmacht prison took place on April 28, 1945. Guards and the remaining prisoners marched in three groups toward Küstrin, Friedland, Mecklenburg-Vorpommern and Jarmen in the direction of Bützow. The last group was captured on May 1 by the Red Army.

Under the GDR government, use of the northern wing of the building was discontinued and the rest was used for the storage of grain. A working group of the Cultural Association of the GDR began research into the history of the Wehrmacht prison. The death cellblock was transformed in the mid-1970s as a memorial.

Between 1990 and 2005 the building remained unused. In 2005, the newly established Foundation "Center for Peace Work - Otto Lilienthal - Hanseatic City of Anklam" took over the prison. After a partial restoration, the building is used as a center of national and international peace work. A permanent exhibition describes the historical significance of the facility.

== Literature ==
- Ulrich Schultz, Stephan Tanneberger: Das ehemalige NS-Wehrmachtsgefängnis Anklam. (in German)
- Landeszentrale für politische Bildung Mecklenburg-Vorpommern (Hrsg.): Gedenkstättenführer. Bildungsarbeit an historischen Orten zur Geschichte politischer Gewalt im 20. Jahrhundert in Mecklenburg-Vorpommern. (in German) Schwerin 2013, ISBN 978-3-00-035469-4, S. 30–31 (Online, PDF).

== Film ==
- Ungehorsam als Tugend - Das Wehrmachtsgefängnis Anklam und die Militärjustiz im Dritten Reich. Regie: Jörg Hermann, Deutschland 2009, ca. 80 min. (in German)
