= Gert Westphal =

German actor

- Gert Westphal, c. 2000
- Born: Curt Gerhard Westphal; 5 October 1920; Dresden, Weimar Republic
- Died: 10 November 2002 (aged 82); Zürich, Switzerland
- Education: Staatsschauspiel Dresden
- Occupations: Actor; narrator
- Organizations: Radio Bremen; Südwestfunk
- Awards: Deutscher Schallplattenpreis; Preis der deutschen Schallplattenkritik; Order of Merit of the Federal Republic of Germany

Curt Gerhard Westphal, stage name Gert Westphal, (5 October 1920 – 10 November 2002) was a German actor, one of the best-known audiobook narrators and speakers in German, described as "König der Vorleser" (king of reciters) and "der Caruso der Vorleser" (the Caruso of reciters). After his reading of her husband's works, Katia Mann called him "des Dichters oberster Mund" (the poet's principal voice). The literary critic Marcel Reich-Ranicki said he was probably the best reciter of German.

== Career ==
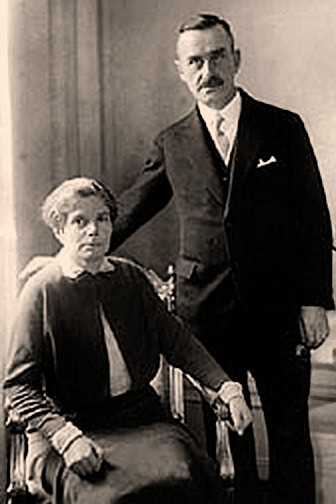
Katia and Thomas Mann

Born in Dresden as the son of a culturally interested factory director, Westphal attended the Realgymnasium in Blasewitz, graduating with the Abitur. He trained in acting with Paul Hoffmann at the Dresdner Staatsschauspielhaus, where he made his stage debut in 1940 in a minor role in Goethe's Götz von Berlichingen. He was then drafted for military service and later became a prisoner of war. In 1946 he moved to Bremen, where he was both a member of the Kammerspiele Bremen and an announcer for Radio Bremen. Starting in 1948, he headed that broadcaster's radio drama division. In 1953, he took the same position with Südwestfunk in Baden-Baden where he remained until 1959. He was in contact with authors such as Alfred Andersch, Ingeborg Bachmann, Gottfried Benn, Max Frisch and Carl Zuckmayer. He commissioned new radio dramas and collaborated with Max Ophüls, Will Quadflieg, Hans Paetsch, Oskar Werner, Walter Jens and Joachim Fest.

As a reciter and audiobook narrator, Westphal recorded major works by German authors, and also translations of writers such as Gustave Flaubert, Victor Hugo, Henry James and Thornton Wilder, with a focus on Russian literature by Chinghiz Aitmatov, Fjodor Dostojewski, Nikolai Gogol, Ivan Goncharov, Maxim Gorki, Nikolai Leskov, Vladimir Nabokov, Leo Tolstoi and Anton Checkov, among others. In 1994, he performed along with Dietrich Fischer-Dieskau in a series of readings of correspondence, such as between Hofmannsthal and Strauss, and between Zelter and Goethe.

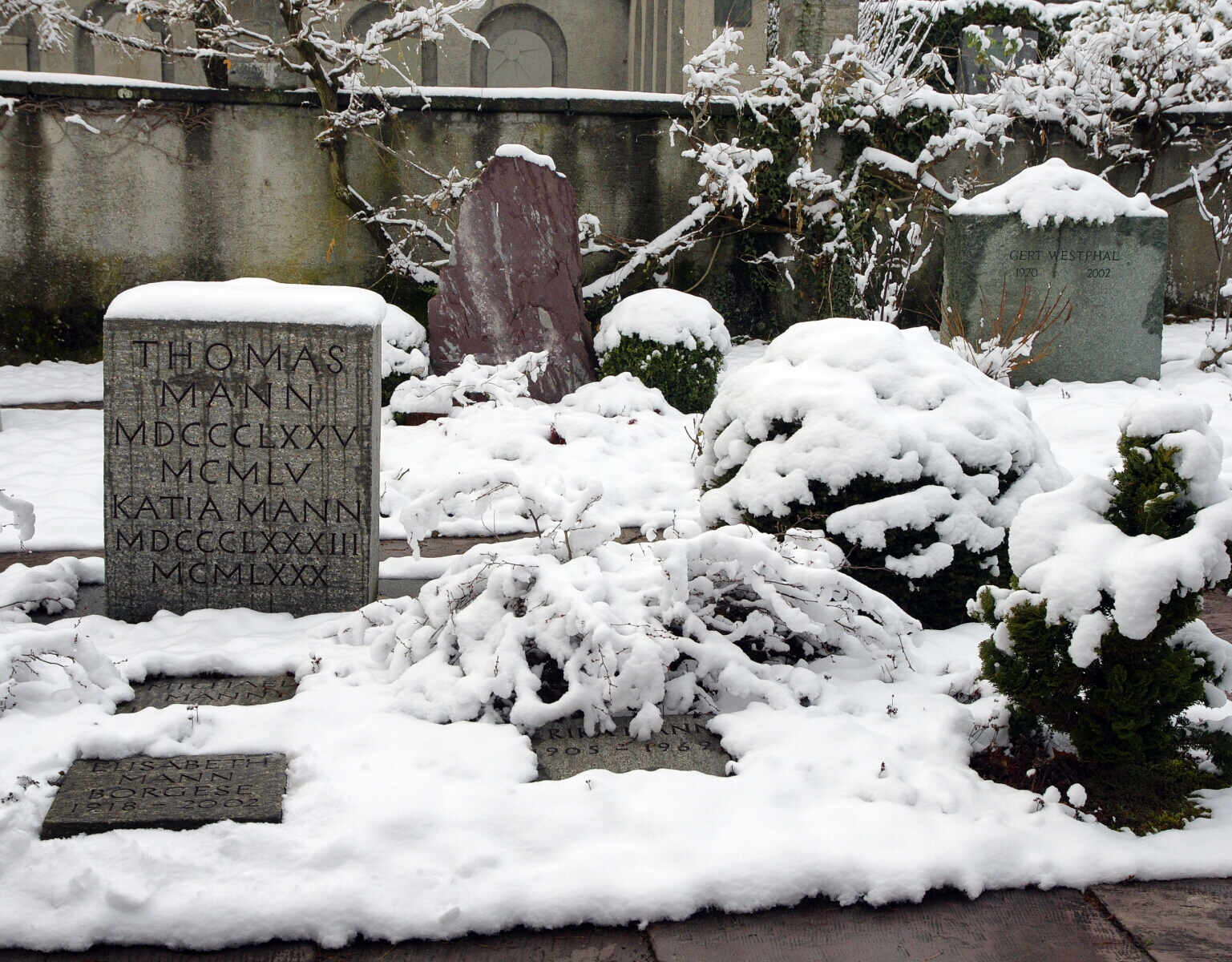
Westphal's grave next to that of the Thomas Mann family

He died in Zürich and was buried in Kilchberg, next to the family grave of Thomas Mann.

== Awards ==
- 1975: Literature prize of Kanton Zürich
- 1982: Officer's Cross of the Order of Merit of the Federal Republic of Germany
- 2001: Biermann-Ratjen-Medaille, for cultural achievements for Hamburg

=== Awards for recordings ===
- Preis der deutschen Schallplattenkritik
  - Ehrenurkunde, 1991, as the first and so far only speaker*
  - Das dreißigste Jahr by Ingeborg Bachmann, 2001
  - Bekenntnisse des Hochstaplers Felix Krull by Thomas Mann, 2002

=== Awards for audio plays ===
- Hörspielpreis der Kriegsblinden for Prinzessin Turandot by Wolfgang Hildesheimer, 1955 (direction)
- Karl Zczuka Prize for Der trojanische Krieg findet nicht statt by Jean Giraudoux, music by Peter Zwetkoff, 1955 (direction)
- Prix Italia for Wovon wir leben und woran wir sterben by Herbert Eisenreich, 1957(speaker)
- Karl-Sczuka-Preis for Ungeduld des Herzens by Stefan Zweig, music by Peter Zwetkoff, 1961 (direction)
- Prix Italia for A hard day's night by Anders Bodelsen, 1967 (direction)
- Hörspiel des Monats for Udo der Stählerne by Theodor Weißenborn and Josef Alois Gleich, January 1994 (narrator)

== Literature ==
- Andreas Kotte, ed. (2005). "Gert Westphal". Theaterlexikon der Schweiz / Dictionnaire du théâtre en Suisse / Dizionario Teatrale Svizzero / Lexicon da teater svizzer [Theater Dictionary of Switzerland]. Vol. 3. Zürich: Chronos. pp. 2084–2085. ISBN 978-3-0340-0715-3. LCCN 2007423414. OCLC 62309181.
- Oliver W. Grabow: Gert Westphal. Gesamtverzeichnis seiner Arbeiten von 1940 bis 2002. Arethousa Verlag, München 2013, ISBN 978-3-934207-22-6.
- Katrin Krämer: Vorlesen ist ein Liebesakt. Gert Westphal – Die Stimme der Literatur, biographic feature, Radio Bremen 2000, aired 22 November 2015
