= Elisabeth Flügge =

- Elisabeth Flügge, 1936
- Born: Elisabeth Uhrbach; 2 April 1895; Hamburg, Germany
- Died: 2 February 1983 (aged 87)
- Occupation: Teacher
- Known for: Caring for and rescuing Jewish people during the Holocaust
- Awards: Righteous Among the Nations; Order of Merit of the Federal Republic of Germany

Elisabeth Flügge (4 February 1895 – 2 February 1983) was a teacher in Hamburg, Germany who helped care for and rescue Jews during the Holocaust and World War II. When the school where she taught excluded Jews from holidays and vacations, she provided a home for the Jewish students. Flügge helped to prevent the deportation of Jews and assisted people emigrating from Germany. She invited a Jewish family to stay at her home during World War II. She received the title Righteous Among the Nations in 1976 and was also awarded the Order of Merit of the Federal Republic of Germany. The notes and newspaper clippings that she kept in 1933 and 1934 of the events precipitating the war were published in 2001.

== Personal life ==
Elisabeth Uhrbach was born on 4 February 1895 in Hamburg and had two sisters. Her father was a merchant and a Freemason who valued diversity, tolerance and commitment to the community. She experienced a free and exploratory period as a member of the Wandervogel (Wandering Bird), a German youth group that valued nature and hiking. At Wandervogel, she met the man whom she would later marry, but he was a German nationalist who did not have her father's approval.

Uhrbach studied at a convent school, taking an accelerated program through which she earned her high-school diploma and teaching certificate in 1916. (Note: In 1930, she took the exam for a higher teaching position.) Three years later, her father died and she was married, taking the surname of Flügge. She gave birth to son Hermann in 1920 and daughter Maria in 1922. She was divorced in 1926. Her son died in 1945.

== Early career ==
In 1919, Flügge began to work as a teacher at a Hamburg private school for boys. She next taught at Ria Wirth's private secondary school for girls in 1926. Knowing Wirth and Gertrud Bäumer, Flügge socialized with like-minded women who were interested in democracy and reform. She taught a wide range of topics, including science, history, mathematics and German. The school admitted both Jewish and non-Jewish students, integrating Jewish girls from a school that closed in 1932.

== The Holocaust era ==
=== Nazi Party leadup to World War I ===
Adolf Hitler was appointed Chancellor of Germany on 30 January 1933. The form of government changed from a republic to a dictatorship, and laws were enacted that classified people by their worth to the country. Those deemed undesirable, such as Jews, were classified as "enemies of the state" or "outcasts."

Flügge kept notes and newspaper clippings of her life in Nazi Germany. She supported writer Ingeborg Hecht-Studniczka, a former student who wrote about the growth of Nazi Germany during a period of widespread support for the Nazis.

In 1938, she taught at Große Freiheit 63, a public elementary school, in the St. Pauli quarter. Children with blond hair (considered the most Ayran-looking) were seated toward the front of buses when the school embarked on outings. By 1938, the school's Jewish students were excluded from school trips. Flügge brought the excluded students to the small village of Ollsen, where she rented a large house, but her actions displeased the school. She continued to take her Jewish students to Ollsen during 1939 and also cared for the students' parents.

=== World War II (1939–1945) ===
In 1942, the Nazis were deporting and killing Jews in large numbers. Because Flügge would not assist in the deportation of Jewish children (Kinderlandverschickung), she worked as a clerk in the school's nutrition office. She was open about her relationship with Jews and she continued to support her former students and their parents. Flügge prevented the deportation of a student's mother and helped some Jews emigrate out of Germany. She helped to ensure that the emigrees' money and most important possessions were sent to them in their new home countries.

Flügge housed a Jewish physician and his family after their house was destroyed when the city was bombed. The family remained with Flügge until the war's end.

She returned to teaching in 1944, working at an elementary school in the Sasel quarter of Hamburg.

== After the war ==
Flügge was the Bäckerbreitergang elementary school's headmistress in 1946 before becoming the principal of Erikastraße elementary school beginning in 1947. She retired in 1958. She maintained correspondence with her former students who had emigrated to other countries and attended a class reunion in New York in 1953. She died on 2 February 1983 in Hamburg.

== Legacy and award ==
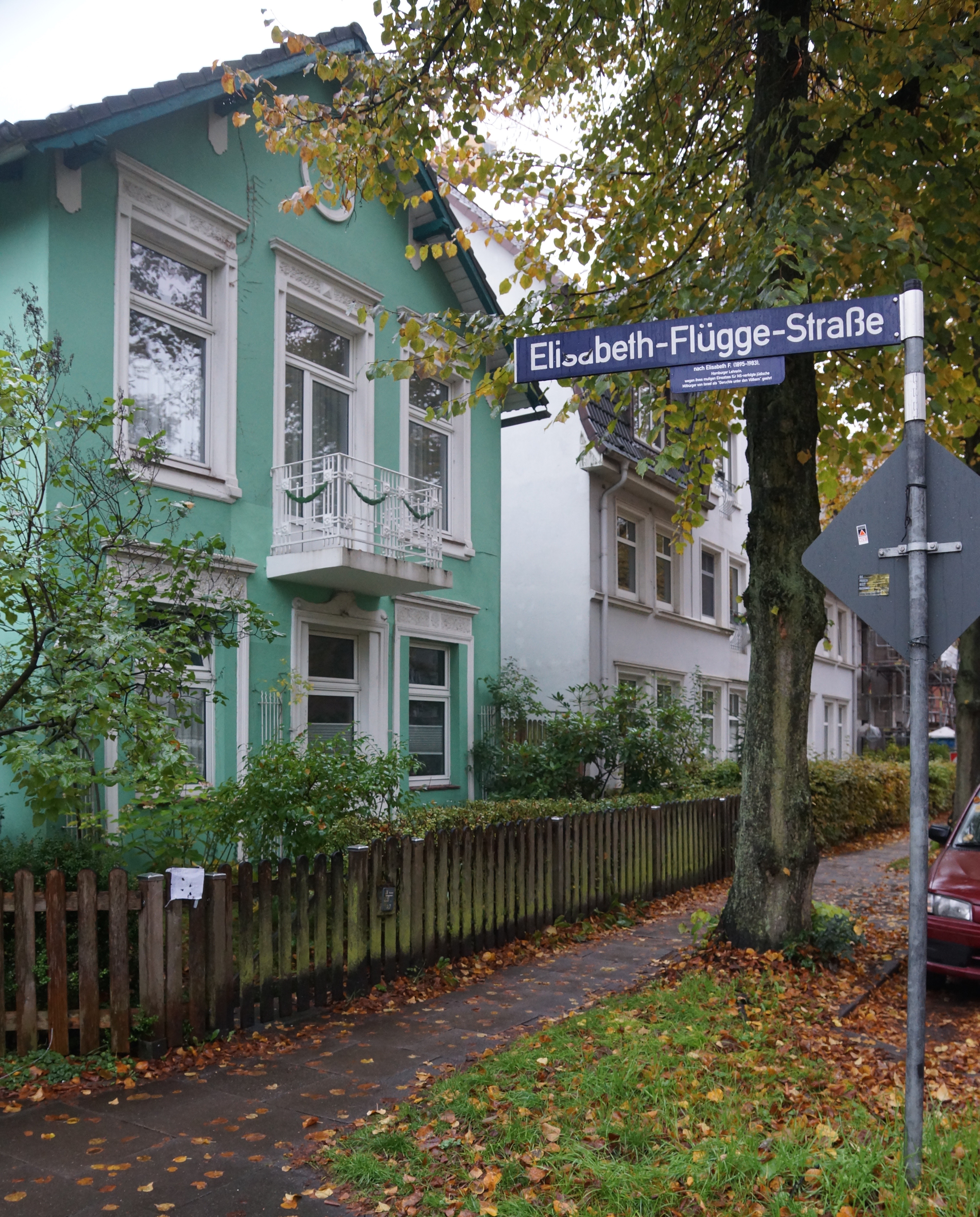
Elisabeth Flügge Straße in the Alsterdorf quarter of Hamburg was named after Flügge in 2002.

Yad Vashem awarded Flügge the title of Righteous Among the Nations on 19 January 1976. A St. John's tree was planted in her honor at the Avenue of the Righteous in Jerusalem.

She was awarded the Order of Merit of the Federal Republic of Germany in 1981 for having protected Jewish refugees at great danger to herself.

== Bibliography ==
- Bake, Rita, ed. (2001). Wie wird es weitergehen... Zeitungsartikel und Notizen aus den Jahren 1933 und 1934 gesammelt und aufgeschrieben von Elisabeth Flügge [What will happen next... Newspaper articles and notes from the years 1933 and 1934 collected and written down by Elisabeth Flügge] (PDF). Landeszentrale für Politische Bildung, Hamburg, Hamburg. ISBN 3-929728-58-3.
- Hecht, Ingeborg (1999). Invisible Walls: A German Family Under the Nuremberg Laws. Northwestern University Press. pp. 34–35. ISBN 978-0-8101-1371-8.
