= Jutta Heinrich =

German feminist writer (1940–2021)

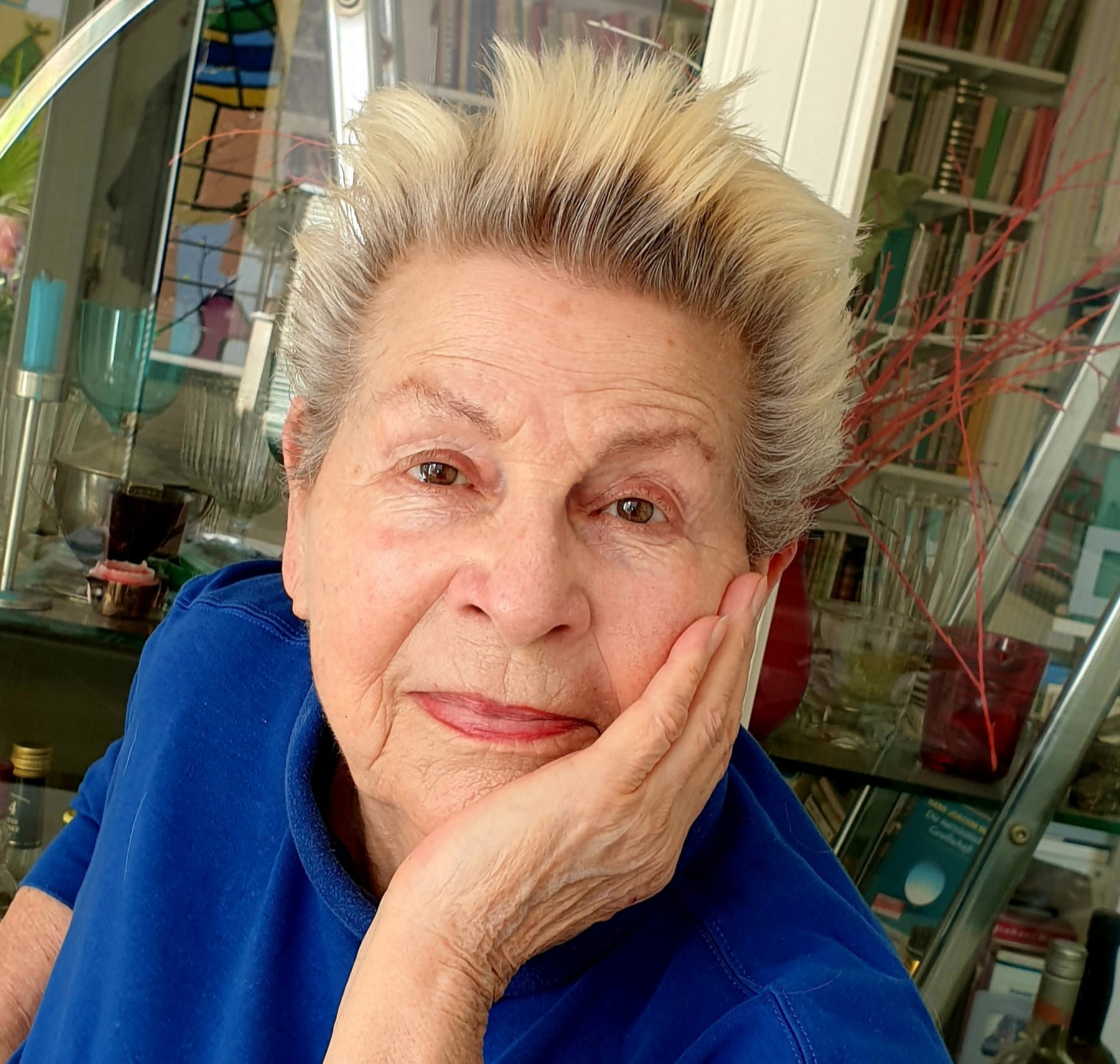
- Born: April 4, 1940; Berlin
- Died: July 23, 2021 (aged 81); Hamburg
- Occupation: writer.
- Writing career
- Language: German
- Notable work: Das Geschlecht des Gedankens

Jutta Heinrich (born April 4, 1940 in Berlin – July 23, 2021 in Hamburg) was a German feminist writer.

== Biography ==
Jutta Heinrich was born on April 4, 1940 in Berlin. She grew up in Bavaria, attended primary and secondary school and then worked in various wholesale and retail businesses. She was the daughter of a lawyer, entrepreneur and artist by training, whose veneer and plywood factory she ran for a time.

After obtaining her Abitur (A-levels), she studied social pedagogy at Hamburg University of Applied Sciences from 1972[2] and German literature and studies at the University of Hamburg from 1975[2].

Alongside her studies, she began to publish literary works. In 1987, she took part in the Festival of German-Language Literature in Klagenfurt. From 1988, she was a lecturer in literature, politics and history at the universities of Bremen, Hamburg and Berlin. In 2005, she was invited to take part in a conference at the Berlin University of the Arts. Heinrich lives in Hamburg. She is also a member of the board of the Kulturstiftung Schloss Agathenburg in Lower Saxony.

She has been a member of the PEN Centre Germany since 1998. In addition to various scholarships, she was awarded the Würzburg Literature Prize in 1989 and the Biermann-Ratjen Medal (de) in 2017.

== Analysis of her works ==
Jutta Heinrich wrote prose, essays, plays and radio drama. Her book Das Geschlecht der Gedanken is regarded as a feminist essay in which she argues for the legitimacy and value of the female sex, not only independently of the male sex, but above all against the male principle. Several books have been based on her theses. She began writing the book in 1966, but at the time it was unthinkable for publishers to allow a woman to publish suchan radical essay. So she had to wait until 1977 to publish it [3].

Commenting on the publication of Jutta Heinrich's Das Geschlecht der Gedanken, Lottemie Doormann wrote:

The ‘challenging invention’ was completed in 1971. She [Jutta Heinrich] offered the book to a number of publishers, received consistently positive reviews, sometimes even euphoric, and there was not even a lack of recommendations from renowned colleagues. But in the end, the answer was always the same: unfortunately, there was no market for the book. And often the caveat : such a fantasy in a woman

She was not the only one to react. The newspaper Die Zeit wrote that it was the victim's revenge, while Der Spiegel mentioned a book about "dead souls". Professor Renate Möhrmann wrote in the Kritisches Lexikon zur deutschsprachigen Gegenwartsliteratur. One of the most exciting, poetic and precise books on the interaction between oppression and violence. Finally, author Jürgen Strasser wrote for the PEN-Zentrum, of which Jutta Heinrich has been a member since 1999: "She has been an important pioneer of feminism and has often challenged traditional roles with a sharp mind".

== Works ==
- Das Geschlecht der Gedanken Roman (in German). 2014. ISBN 978-3-596-30097-6. OCLC 907955338.
- Unterwegs (in German). Berlin: Playmarket-Theaterverlag Jacobs u. Kersten. 1978. OCLC 74440701.
- Mit meinem Mörder Zeit bin ich allein (in German). Frauenoffensive. 1981. ISBN 978-3-88104-107-2. OCLC 11563947.
- Eingegangen (in German). Orlanda Frauenverlag. 1987. ISBN 978-3-922166-27-6. OCLC 17331388.
- Männerdämmerung (in German). Cologne. 1989.
- Heinrich, Jutta (2014). Alles ist Körper extreme Texte (in German). Fischer Digital. ISBN 978-3-596-30099-0. OCLC 907955340.
- Im Revier der Worte : Provokationen, Gegenreden, Zwischenrufe (in German). Fischer Taschenbuch Verlag. 1994. ISBN 978-3-596-12308-7. OCLC 31756894.
- Meyer, Adolf-Ernst (1995). Sturm und Zwang : Schreiben als Geschlechterkampf (in German). Klein. ISBN 978-3-89521-025-9. OCLC 33985905.
- Unheimliche Reise : Roman (in German). Europäische Verlagsanstalt. 1998. ISBN 978-3-434-50427-6. OCLC 39126639.
- Texte, Analysen, Portraits. Zeichen und Spuren (in German). Bremen. 1985. ISBN 978-3-924588-56-4.

== Bibliography ==
- Di Lenardi, Andreas (2015). Gewalt ausübende Frauenfiguren in der neueren deutschen Frauenliteratur am Beispiel von Jutta Heinrichs Roman Das Geschlecht der Gedanken Eine interdisziplinäre Werkinterpretation und Diskursanalyse (in German). ISBN 978-3-7347-6414-1. OCLC 904829855.
- Spooren, Dagmar (2001). Unbequeme Töchter, entthronte Patriarchen : deutschsprachige Bücher über Väter von Autorinnen (in German). Deutscher Universitäts-Verlag. ISBN 978-3-663-09070-0. OCLC 1112389735.
- Eidukevičienė, Rūta (2003). Jenseits des Geschlechterkampfes : traditionelle Aspekte des Frauenbildes in der Prosa von Marie Luise Kaschnitz, Gabriele Wohmann und Brigitte Kronauer (in German). Röhrig Universitätsverlag. ISBN 978-3-86110-345-5. OCLC 53332224.
- "Jutta Heinrich - Kritisches Lexikon der deutschsprachigen Gegenwartsliteratur (KLG)". www.nachschlage.net.
