= Rudolf Kelber =

German musician

Rudolf Kelber (born 1948, Traunstein, Germany) is a German organist, harpsichordist, conductor, and church musician.

== Biography ==
Rudolf Kelber began his musical education at high school in Nuremberg State Conservatory and received instruction in piano, organ, cello and music theory. From 1967 to 1974, he studied church music, conducting, and organ (master class) at the Musikhochschule in Munich.

In 1982, Rudolf Kelber succeeded Heinz Wunderlich as cantor and organist at the Hauptkirche St. Jacobi in Hamburg.

Kelber initiated the fundamental restoration of the Arp Schnitger organ, the largest sounding baroque organ in existence, in the Hauptkirche St. Jacobi, which was completed in 1993. The second organ of St. Jacobi (Kemper 1960/1968) was also repaired on his initiative in 2008.

The tenure of Rudolf Kelber at the Hauptkirche St. Jacobi in Hamburg ended in 2015. He continues to perform as an organist, harpsichordist, and jazz pianist and composes.

== Organist ==
Kelber has performed as organ soloist in the U.S., Japan, Israel, and almost all European countries with a wide repertoire: in addition to composers in the North German tradition (determined by the historic Schnitger organ) he also plays the music of Liszt, Reger, and Messiaen, as well as arrangements of symphonies or parts from operas, tango, and blues. He has frequently accompanied silent films with organ improvisations.

== Conductor ==
Rudolf Kelber has conducted the great Passions, oratorios and requiems as well as a lot of baroque, classical, romantic and modern symphonic works.

Staged performances of operas and oratorios by Cavalieri, Monteverdi, Stradella, Purcell, Handel, Gluck and Mozart have developed under his direction in both Heidelberg and Hamburg.

From 2005 to 2009, Kelber conducted five baroque operas from the repertoire of the Hamburg Gänsemarkt opera in concert performances at the Bucerius Kunst Forum for the ZEIT-Stiftung.

=== Premieres ===
- Ernst-Ulrich von Kameke: Moabiter Requiem "In Tyrannos" (premieres in Hamburg (1999, Hauptkirche St. Michaelis) and in Hannover at the Expo 2000)
- Edward Elgar: The Apostles (Hamburg premiere 2005)
- Olivier Messiaen: La Transfiguration de Notre Seigneur Jésus-Christ (Hamburg premiere 2008, Bremen premiere 2008)

== Works ==
=== Compositions ===
- Missa super Cantus Lennonenses McCartnesque (mixed choir a cappella / 2001)
- Cantata in honorem Henrici Sagittarii (soprano, vibraphone, mixed choir / 2006)
- Paul-Gerhardt-cantata (mezzo-soprano solo, choir, brass / 2007)
- I Bambini di Sant' Anna (mixed choir a cappella /2014)
- "Obersalzberg" - Musiktheater about Sigmund Freud and Adolf Hitler 1929 in Berchtesgaden (2016)

=== Reconstructions and compilations ===
- Claudio Monteverdi: Arianna (1997)
- Johann Sebastian Bach: St Mark Passion (1998)
- Claudio Monteverdi: Vespro secondo (1999, compilation)
- Modest Mussorgsky: Glagolitic Mass (2005)
- Johann Sebastian Bach: St Luke Passion (2011, pasticcio)

== Awards ==
- 1972: Richard-Strauss-Prize of the city of Munich
- 2015: Arp-Schnitger-Verdienstmedaille of the Arp Schnitger Society
- 2018: Awarding of the Senator-Biermann-Ratjen-Medaille

== Teaching ==
From 2003 until 2015, Rudolf Kelber has been teaching organ playing at the University of the Arts Bremen and, from 2008 until 2015, repertoire studies at Hochschule für Musik und Theater Hamburg.

== Discography ==
- Europäische Orgelmusik des 17. und 18. Jahrhunderts - Arp Schnitger organ (1993)
- Johann Sebastian Bach - Arp Schnitger organ (1997)
- Nu ward veel dusend Lichter hell - Low German Christmas carols (1998)
- J. S. Bach, Markus-Passion BWV 247 in the reconstruction of Rudolf Kelber (1999)
- Monteverdi: Vespro secondo (new compilation of psalms / 1999)
- Organ improvisations on theme sketches by Hans Henny Jahnn (2000)
- Fremde Vögel - Missa Super Cantus Lennonenses McCartnesques for choir a cappella, Tangos, Blues, Ragtimes for organ and harpsichord (2003)
- Mattheson: Opera "Boris Goudenow" (2005)
- Mattheson: Opera "Die betrogene Staats-Liebe" or "Die unglückselige Cleopatra" (2006)
- Gott loben, das ist unser Amt - Kantorei St. Jacobi Hamburg 1958 - 2008 - concert recordings (2008)
- Ostwärts schweift der Blick: Mussorgskij, Glagolitische Messe and Kodály, Missa brevis (2010)
- J. S. Bach, Lukas-Passion in the reconstruction of Rudolf Kelber (2011)
- Norddeutsche Orgelmeister und Bach – Arp Schnitter organ (2013/2014)

== Sources ==
- Hauptkirche St. Jacobi zu Hamburg
- http://www.bach-cantatas.com/Bio/Kelber-Rudolf.htm
- Official website of Rudolf Kelber

Deutsche Nationalbibliothek / Deutsches Musikarchiv:

- http://d-nb.info/gnd/104030240
- http://d-nb.info/gnd/134424069
- http://d-nb.info/97073221X

Concert programs, CDs and the German newspapers like "Hamburger Abendblatt":

- http://www.abendblatt.de/
- http://www.arp-schnitger-gesellschaft.de
- https://www.akademie-der-kuenste.de/2019/240319.html
