= Carl August Wilhelm Berends =

German physician (1759–1826)

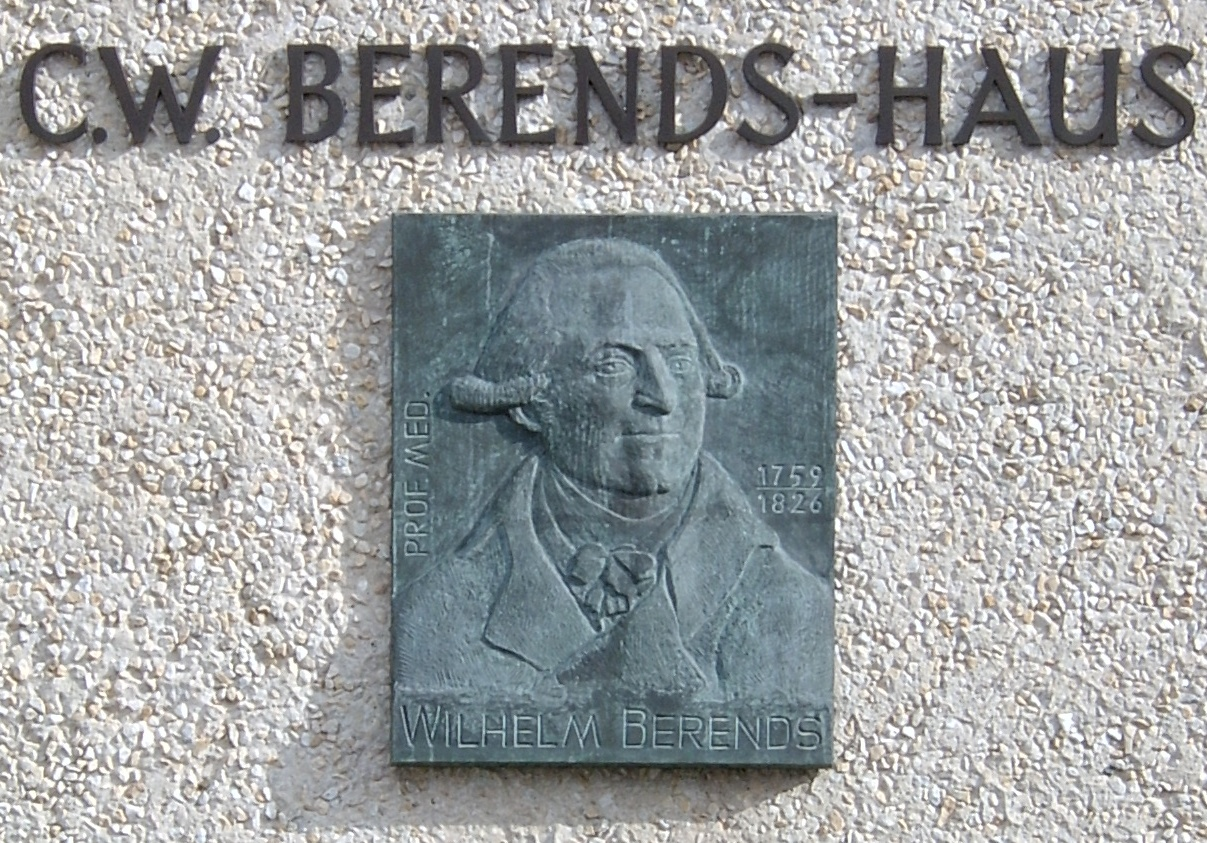
Commemorative Plaque of Carl Berends, Studentendorf Mühlenweg- Frankfurt (Oder)

Carl August Wilhelm Berends (19 April 1759 – 1 December 1826) was a German medical doctor born in Anklam, Pomerania.

He studied medicine at Viadrina University in Frankfurt an der Oder, where in 1788 he became a professor of medicine. In 1811, he moved to the University of Breslau, being due to the closure of Viadrina University in Frankfurt, and resulting in the relocation of much of its faculty to Breslau. In 1815, he was appointed professor of medicine at the University of Berlin and hospital director at the Berlin Charité.

In 1789, Berends published Über den Unterricht junger Ärzte am Krankenbett (Education of Young Physicians at the Bedside), in which he described his experiences at the Thielschen Krankenhaus in Frankfurt. Shortly after his death in 1826, his one-time student, Karl Sundelin, published Berends' lectures on practical medical science ("Vorlesungen über die praktische Arzneiwissenschaft").
