= Ingeborg Hecht-Studniczka =

German writer

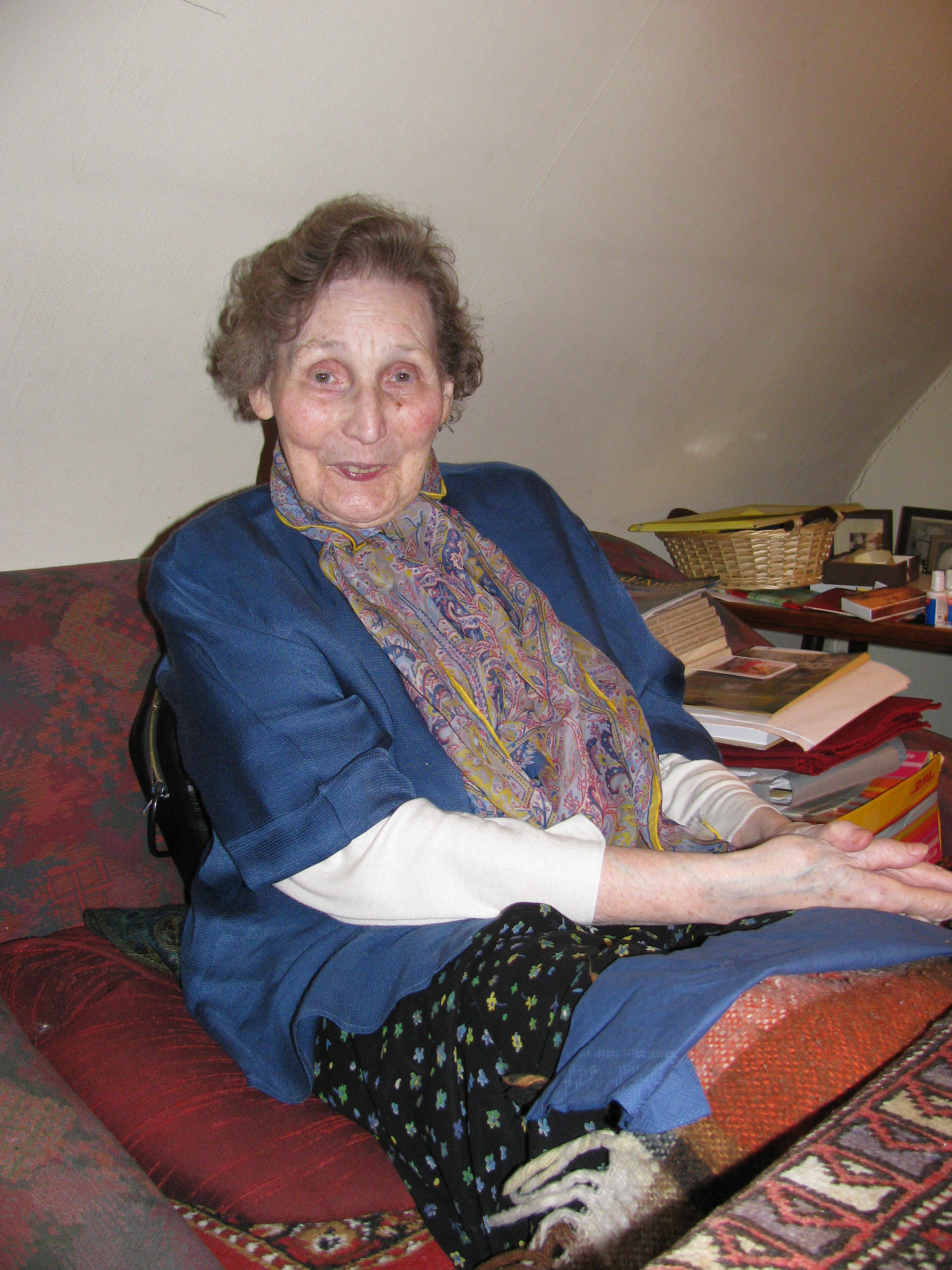
Hecht-Studniczka in 2009

Ingeborg Hecht-Studniczka (April 1, 1921 – May 6, 2011) was a German writer who wrote a book about the Nuremberg Laws, As invisible walls grew, and the effect that they had on her life. From 1948 to 1954, she lived in Badenweiler. She was a member of Cercle littéraire and wrote about Badenweiler and its writers, including How could I ever forget Badenweiler. She also wrote My Black Forest about the spa town. She was also an essayist and journalist. Hecht-Studniczka has received many awards.

== See also ==
- Biermann-Ratjen-Medaille
- Elisabeth Flügge, supporter of Hecht-Studniczka
