= Günter Discher =

Günter Discher (20 March 1925 – 9 September 2012) was a swing music lover and gramophone record-collector, and was called "the oldest jazz-DJ in Germany".

== Life ==
Discher was born on 20 March 1925 in Hamburg-Eimsbüttel. The Nazi "Reichskulturkammer ("Reich Chamber of Culture") proscribed swing music as "un-German" and "degenerate". After the start of World War II the music was even declared "enemy music". Even though often claimed otherwise, swing music was not officially made illegal, but the members of the Swing Kids were observed and persecuted by the Gestapo.

"Undesirable" records disappeared from the shelves of the record shops, but Discher still got hold of what are rare collectibles today: a friend of his was a soldier stationed in Denmark. In comparison, there the range of records was heavenly. The soldier sent the sought-after records to Germany, labelled as "Heerespost" (army mail), and therefore could cross the border without being opened by customs.

Discher distributed the records among clubs and acquaintances in Hamburg – St. Pauli. Even then, his collection was already about 400 records.

In 1942, he was denounced to the Gestapo and arrested. Until the end of the war, he was sent to the Moringen concentration camp for young people. The reason given was that he "endangers, according to the evidence of the state police, proven by his behavior, the existence and security of the people and state, in that he brings substantial unrest into the population by his subversive and harmful activities".

As a result of the detention, his health was affected and he had to undergo several operations.

After the war Discher stayed in Hamburg and became a well-known swing music expert. He owned a huge archive of about 10.000 CDs and 25.000 LPs of swing music.

He had his own CD edition at the label Ceraton. For the "Günter Discher Edition", many well-known, but also lesser-known and rare pieces of music from his collection were sound restored and published. In his eyewitness interviews he talks about the specialties of the different artists. He also talked about his love of swing music and his youth, in lectures at memorial sites and (music) universities.

In addition, Discher was believed to be the oldest DJ in Germany. He played a great variety of swing and jazz, appealing to all audiences, and also appeared together with the second great swing DJ Swingin' Swanee all over Germany.

In 2000, he was awarded the Biermann-Ratjen-Medaille by the City of Hamburg for his outstanding contributions to the culture of Hamburg. In 2006, he established his own podcast on his website "Hotkoffer", where he presented swing music of the 1930s and 40s.

== Death ==
Discher died on 9 September 2012 in Hamburg at the age of 87.

== Quotes ==
"For us kids back then swing music was a certain way of life, swing music meant unlimited freedom. We were looking for a rockin' thing" "You may start dancing now, but please refrain from destroying the furniture"
