= Theater Mär =

Theatre in Hamburg, Germany

Theater Mär is a theatre in Hamburg, Germany.
