= Theater an der Marschnerstraße =

Theatre in Hamburg, Germany

Coordinates: 53°34′26″N 10°02′24″E

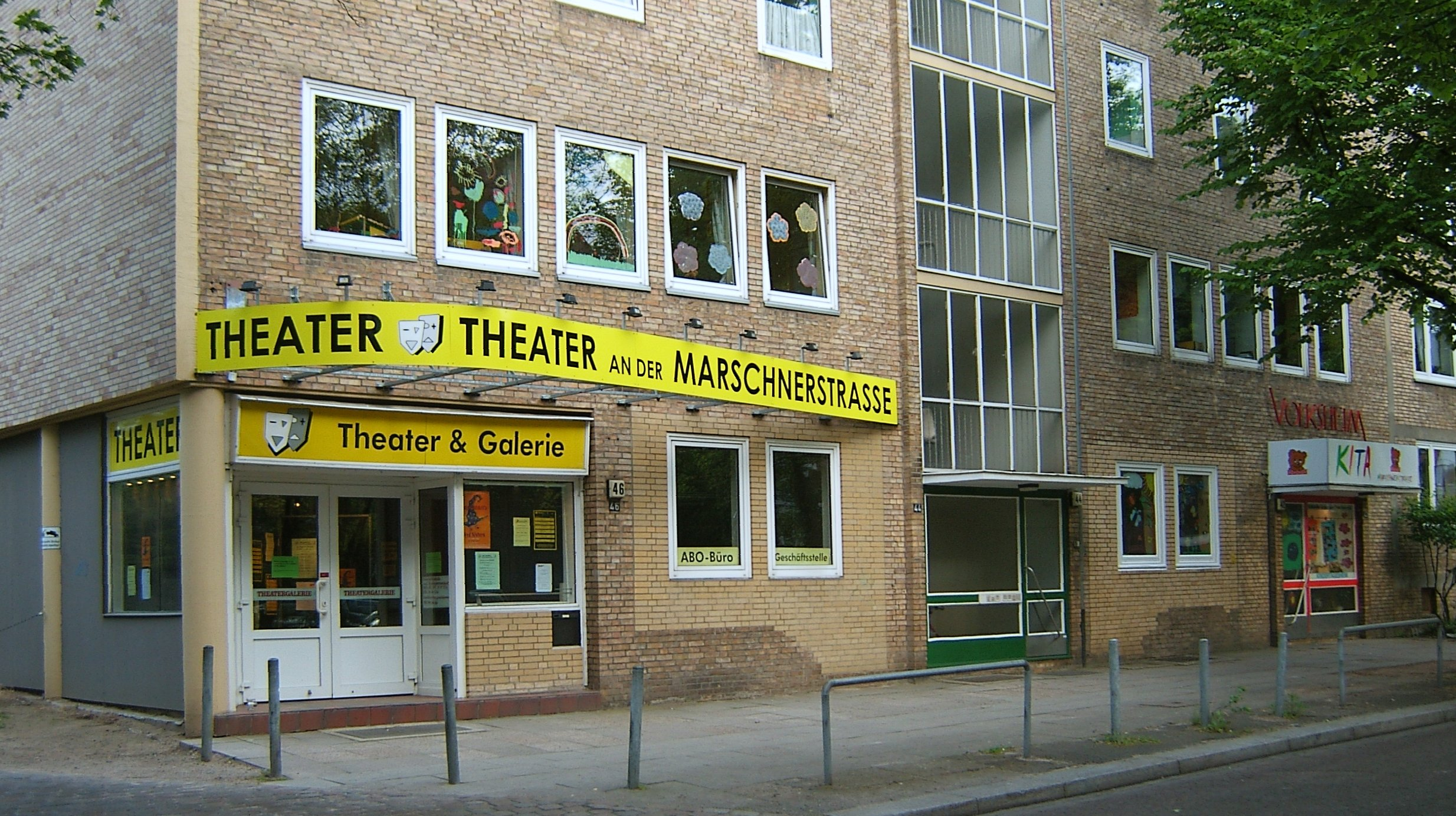
An image of Theater an der Marschnerstraße

Theater an der Marschnerstraße is a theatre in Hamburg, Germany.
