= Jürgen Jürgens =

German choral conductor and academic teacher

- Born: 5 August 1925; Frankfurt am Main
- Died: 4 August 1994 (aged 68); Hamburg, Germany
- Education: Musisches Gymnasium Frankfurt; Musikhochschule Freiburg
- Occupations: Chorale conductor; Academic teacher
- Organizations: Monteverdi-Chor Hamburg; University of Hamburg
- Awards: Biermann Ratjen Medal; Johannes Brahms Medal

Jürgen Jürgens (5 October 1925 – 4 August 1994) was a German choral conductor and academic teacher. He founded and directed the Monteverdi-Chor Hamburg, a pioneering ensemble for Monteverdi's music.

== Biography ==
Born in Frankfurt am Main, Jürgens received his musical training at the Musisches Gymnasium Frankfurt with Kurt Thomas. Jürgens studied singing and choir direction with Konrad Lechner at the Musikhochschule Freiburg. In 1955, he founded the award-winning Monteverdi-Chor Hamburg. They recorded for Archiv Produktion, focussing on works of Claudio Monteverdi. Later the choir became involved in the Telefunken/Teldec Bach cantatas project with the Leonhardt-Consort. From 1961 to 1993, Jürgens was University Music Director of the Choir and Orchestra at the University of Hamburg. and was appointed professor at the University of Hamburg in 1973.

He died in Hamburg and was buried at the Ohlsdorf Cemetery.

== Awards ==
- 1985 Biermann Ratjen Medal
- 1991 Johannes Brahms Medal

== Discography ==
- Heinrich Schütz: St. Luke Passion, Max van Egmond, Peter-Christoph Runge – Jürgen Jürgens, 1966. OCLC 80514101
- Monteverdi: Lamento d'Arianna, Jürgen Jürgens, Monteverdi-Chor Hamburg, 1973. OCLC 1116218410
- Alessandro Scarlatti: Madrigale, Hamburg, 1975. OCLC 956308417
- Schütz: Die italienischen Madrigale, 1976. OCLC 883802223
- Anton Bruckner Music of the St. Florian Period, 1984 – CD: BSVD-0109, 2011 (Bruckner Archive Production). OCLC 15655552
- Monteverdi (1980), Marien-Vesper 1610 (in Latin), Telefunken, OCLC 7524258
