= Schilleroper =

Former theatre in Hamburg

Coordinates: 53°33′29″N 9°57′42″E

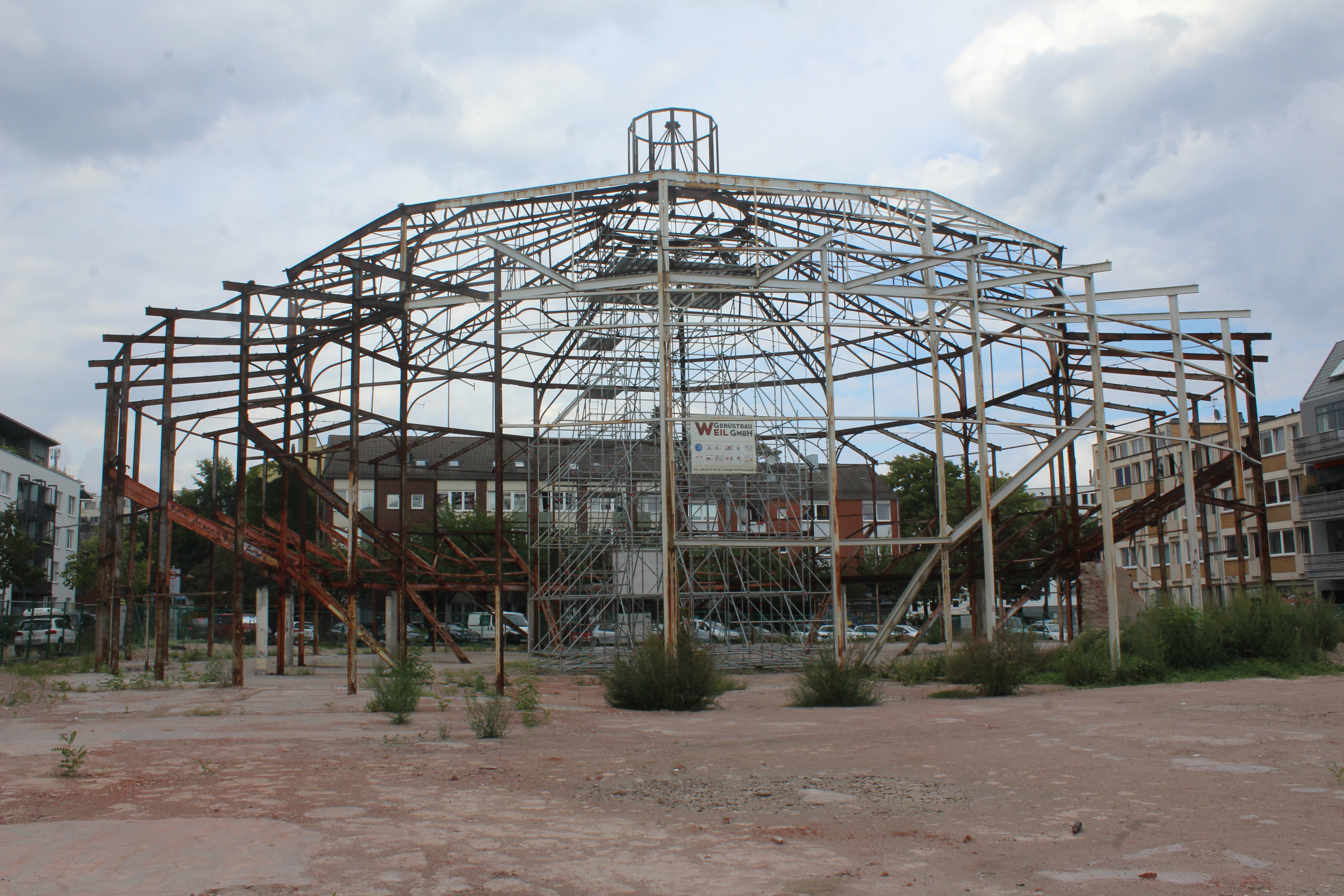
The Schilleroper in August 2022

The Schilleroper is a former circus theater in the St. Pauli quarter of Hamburg, Germany. The building is listed as part of the protected cultural heritage of the city, but is also currently abandoned, having been heavily damaged during the second World War.
