= Monteverdi-Chor Hamburg =

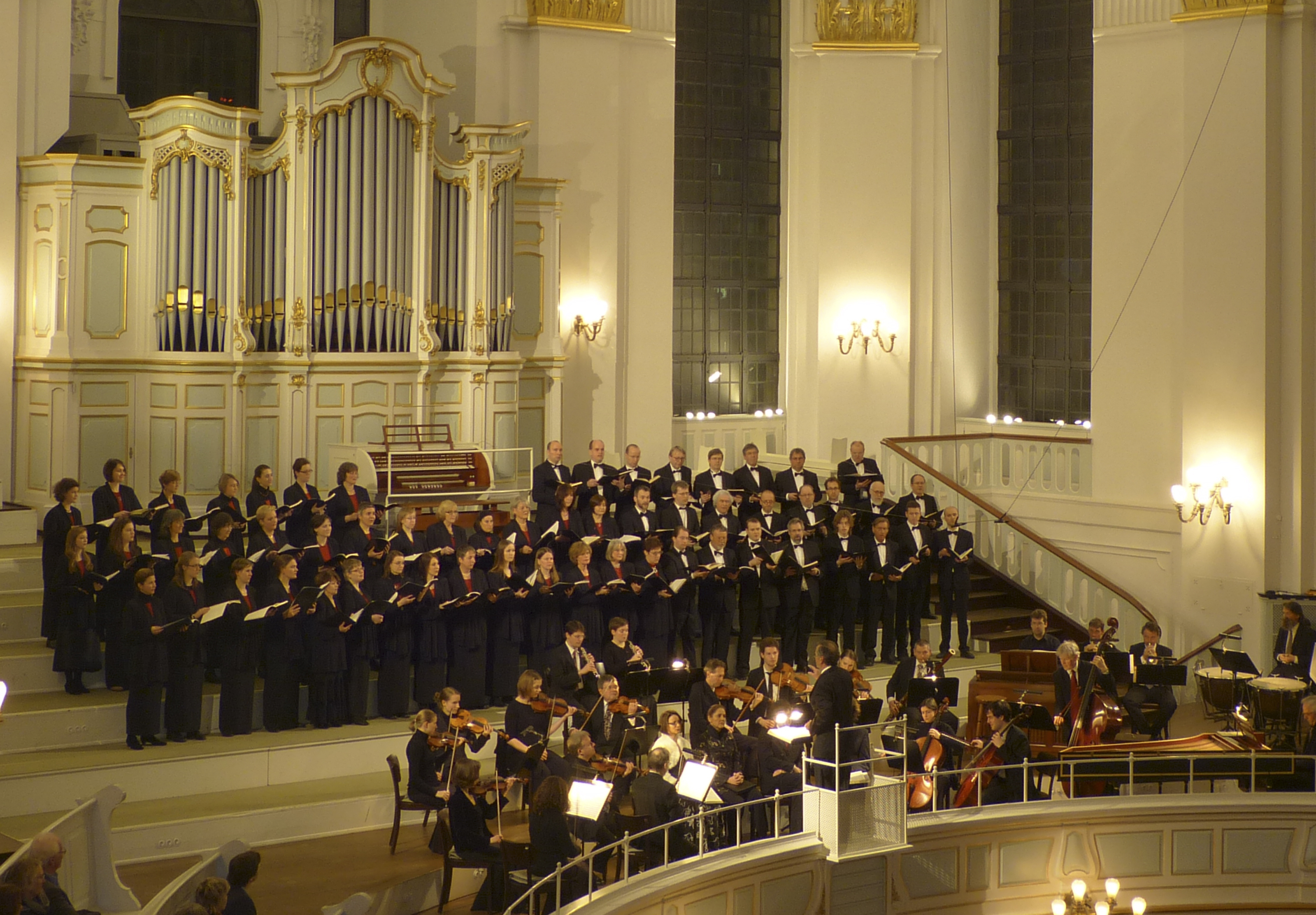
Monteverdi-Chor in February 2012

The Monteverdi-Chor Hamburg is a mixed choir in Hamburg, the chamber choir of the University of Hamburg since 1961. Founded in 1955 by Jürgen Jürgens and directed by him until 1994, it is one of Germany's most famous concert choirs. The choir is well known for its interpretations of Baroque and Renaissance music, but covers choral music from the Renaissance to contemporary music. Since 1994, the conductor has been Gothart Stier.

== History ==
The choir was founded in 1955 as the "Chor am Italienischen Kulturinstitut" (Choir at the Italian Cultural Institute), but renamed the same year after Claudio Monteverdi, then a largely unknown composer. Since 1961 it has been the chamber choir of the University of Hamburg, where Jürgens worked as a director of music from 1961 to 1993.

After four years of intensive preparation, the Monteverdi-Chor won first prize at the international choral competition Concorso Polifonico Internazionale "Guido d'Arezzo" in Arezzo, Italy, in 1959. In 1962, it won first prize also at the international competition in Lille, France.

The choir became famous by collaboration with Gustav Leonhardt, Nikolaus Harnoncourt, Frans Brüggen and Eduard Melkus, among others, recording for Teldec and Archiv Produktion. The choir recorded rarities. In the 1960s it recorded Bach cantatas, with soloists and players who later became famous in the field of historically informed performance, such as tenor Kurt Equiluz, bass Max van Egmond, violinist Jaap Schröder, recorder player Frans Brüggen and organist Gustav Leonhardt, among others. In 1990 works by Max Reger including his Requiem were recorded in collaboration with the choir of St. Michaelis, soloist Dietrich Fischer-Dieskau and the Philharmonisches Staatsorchester Hamburg, conducted by Gerd Albrecht. The choir was invited to music festivals at home and abroad, to almost all countries of Western and Eastern Europe, the Middle East, the United States, Central and Latin America, Southeast Asia, China and Australia.

After the sudden death of Jürgen Jürgens in August 1994, Gothart Stier from Leipzig, a former concert singer, became artistic director. The choir has about 60 singers. Stier has continued the tradition to focus on a cappella music. He also performed classical and romantic choral music including Verdi in cooperation with the Staatskapelle Halle, the Mitteldeutsches Kammerorchester, the Neues Bachisches Collegium Musicum, and members of the Gewandhausorchester. On 16 October 2010, the choir performed Monteverdi's Marienvesper in the Berlin Cathedral with the ensemble amarcord and the Lautten Compagney. In 2018, Antonius Adamske has been elected as new principal conductor.

== Recordings ==
- Felix Mendelssohn: Paulus, Stephanie Stiller, Christa Bonhoff, Christoph Genz, Siegfried Lorenz, Staatskapelle Halle, cond: Gothart Stier [1998], Ambitus 97942.
- Felix Mendelssohn: Elias, Stephanie Stiller, Annette Markert, Martin Petzold, Siegfried Lorenz, Staatskapelle Halle, Gothart Stier [1996], Ambitus 97941.
- Max Reger: Orchesterlieder, Dietrich Fischer-Dieskau, St. Michaelis-Chor, Philharmonisches Staatsorchester Hamburg, cond: Gerd Albrecht [1990], Orfeo 209901.
- Claudio Monteverdi: Vespro della Beata Vergine, Barbara Schlick, Ine Kollecker, John Elwes, Wilfried Jochens, Holger Hampel, Christfried Biebrach, Gustav Hehring, Camerata Accademica Hamburg, cond: Jürgen Jürgens [1987], Ambitus 383826.
- Marco da Gagliano: La Dafne, Norma Lerer, Barbara Schlick, Ine Kollecker, Nigel Rogers, Ian Partridge, David Thomas, Berthold Possemeyer, Camerata Accademica Hamburg, Jürgen Jürgens [1977], Deutsche Grammophon 437074-2.
- Claudio Monteverdi: L'Orfeo, Ian Partridge, Nigel Rogers, John Elwes, Camerata Accademia Hamburg, Jürgen Jürgens [1974], Deutsche Grammophon 002894428723.
- Henry Purcell: Dido and Aeneas, Tatiana Troyanos, Barry McDaniel, Sheila Armstrong, Patricia Johnson, Margaret Baker, Margaret Lensky, Paul Esswood, Nigel Rogers, chamber orchestra of the NDR, cond: Charles Mackerras [1967], Teldec 8573-81141-2.
- Johann Sebastian Bach: Laß, Fürstin, laß noch einen Strahl, BWV 198, Der Friede sei mit dir, BWV 158, Wer weiß, wie nahe mir mein Ende? BWV 27, Rotraud Hansmann, Helen Watts, Kurt Equiluz, Max van Egmond, Concerto Amsterdam, Jürgen Jürgens [1967], Teldec 4509093687-2.
- Claudio Monteverdi: Vespro della Beata Vergine, Rotraud Hansmann, Irmgard Jacobeit, Nigel Rogers, Bert van t'Hoff, Max van Egmond, Concentus Musicus Wien, Leitung: Jürgen Jürgens [1967], Teldec 4509-92175-2.
- Georg Philipp Telemann: Der Tag des Gerichts, Gertraud Landwehr-Herrmann, Cora Canne Meijer, Kurt Equiluz, Max van Egmond, Concentus Musicus Wien, cond: Nikolaus Harnoncourt [1966], Teldec 9031-77621-2.
- Johann Sebastian Bach: Schleicht, spielende Wellen, BWV 206, Irmgard Jacobeit, Wilhelmine Mattès, Tom Brand, Jacques Villisech, Amsterdamer Kammerorchester, cond: André Rieu [1962], Teldec 8573-81141-2.
- Anton Bruckner Music of the St. Florian Period, Jürgen Jürgens, Monteverdi-Chor Hamburg and Israel Chamber Orchestra [1984], BSVD-0109, 2011 (Bruckner Archive Production)
- Anton Bruckner Music of St Florian Period (II), Jürgen Jürgens, Monteverdi-Chor Hamburg and Israel Chamber Orchestra [1984], BSVD-0111 (Bruckner Archive Production)

== Awards and prizes ==
- 1976: Johannes Brahms Medal of Hamburg
