= Theater Istasyon =

Coordinates: 53°33′23″N 9°56′46″E

Theater Istasyon is a theatre in Hamburg, Germany.

It was founded in 1989 by the Türk Toplumu e.V. theatre association and is the only Turkish theatre with its own stage in the Hanseatic city. According to the Renk list of German-Turkish theaters, the plays performed here are mostly bilingual, though most of the productions are of Turkish origin.
