= Schmidt Theater =

Theatre in St. Pauli, Hamburg, Germany

Coordinates: 53°32′57″N 9°57′50″E

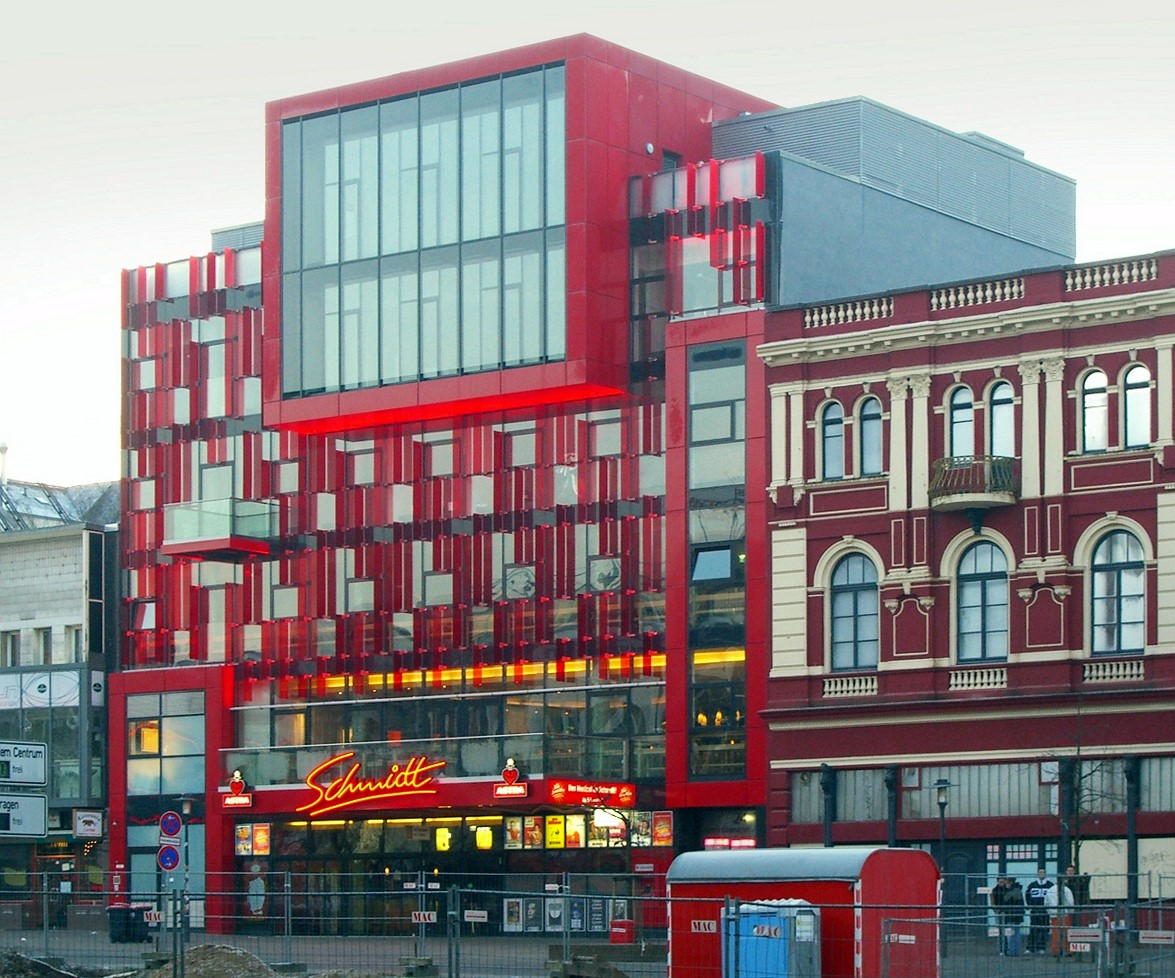
- Schmidt Theater (rebuilt 2004/5)
- Interactive map of Schmidt Theater
- Address: Spielbudenplatz 27-28; 20359 Hamburg; Germany
- Operator: Schmidts Tivoli GmbH
- Seating type: reserved seating
- Capacity: 620 (Schmidts Tivoli); 423 (Schmidt Theater); 200 (Schmidtchen)
- Type: Theater
- Events: theatre, musical, comedy, concerts
- Public transit: St. Pauli (U3)

Construction
- Opened: 8 August 1988
- Expanded: 1 September 1991 (Schmidts Tivoli); 2015 (Schmidtchen)
- Rebuilt: 2004/5

Website
- tivoli.de

Schmidt Theater is a theatre in Hamburg, Germany, located at St. Pauli's Spielbudenplatz. It has three venues: the Schmidt Theater itself (423 seats), the "large house" just a few steps away, called Schmidts Tivoli (620 seats), and the Schmidtchen (200 seats). The theater was co-founded by Corny Littmann. The theater operates without state funding.

== See also ==
- List of theatres in Hamburg
