= Theater Schachar =

Former theatre in Hamburg

Theater Schachar was a private Jewish theatre in Hamburg, Germany, which existed from 1998 to 2004. The theatre was founded in 1998 in Hamburg by graphic artist and playwright Daniel Haw.
