= Kabarett Mon Marthe =

Theatre in Hamburg, Germany

Coordinates: 53°35′44″N 9°59′01″E

Kabarett Mon Marthe was a theatre in the Eppendorf quarter of Hamburg, Germany.
