= Opernloft =

Theatre in Hamburg, Germany

Coordinates: 53°33′10″N 9°59′06″E

- Formation: 2003
- Type: Theatre group
- Location: Hamburg, Germany

Opernloft is an alternative opera theatre in Hamburg, Germany, located at the Altona Harbor on the Elbe River.

Many of Opernloft's shows have been staged as modern interpretations. Their 2023 production of Hansel and Gretel interpreted the piece as two patients in a dementia care ward.

== History ==
Opernloft was founded in 2003. It has previously been situated in Wandsbek and at a former Axel Springer printing plant in Fuhlentwiete.

In 2018, the theatre moved into its current home, a former ferry terminal on the Elbe, in late 2018.

In October 2021, the group produced Die Entführung aus dem Serail as a series of one minute videos, which they released on TikTok over the course of three weeks.

== Shows ==
Dates	Show	Notes	Ref
	Semiramis		
November 2019	La traviata		
	La boheme		
March–April 2023	Hansel and Gretel		
October–December 2023	Der Rosenkavalier		
December 2023	Mord auf Backbord		
January 2024	Blaubart – sind die Frauen noch zu retten?		
TBA	Fußballoper		
