= Anklam =

Town in Mecklenburg-Vorpommern, Germany

- Town
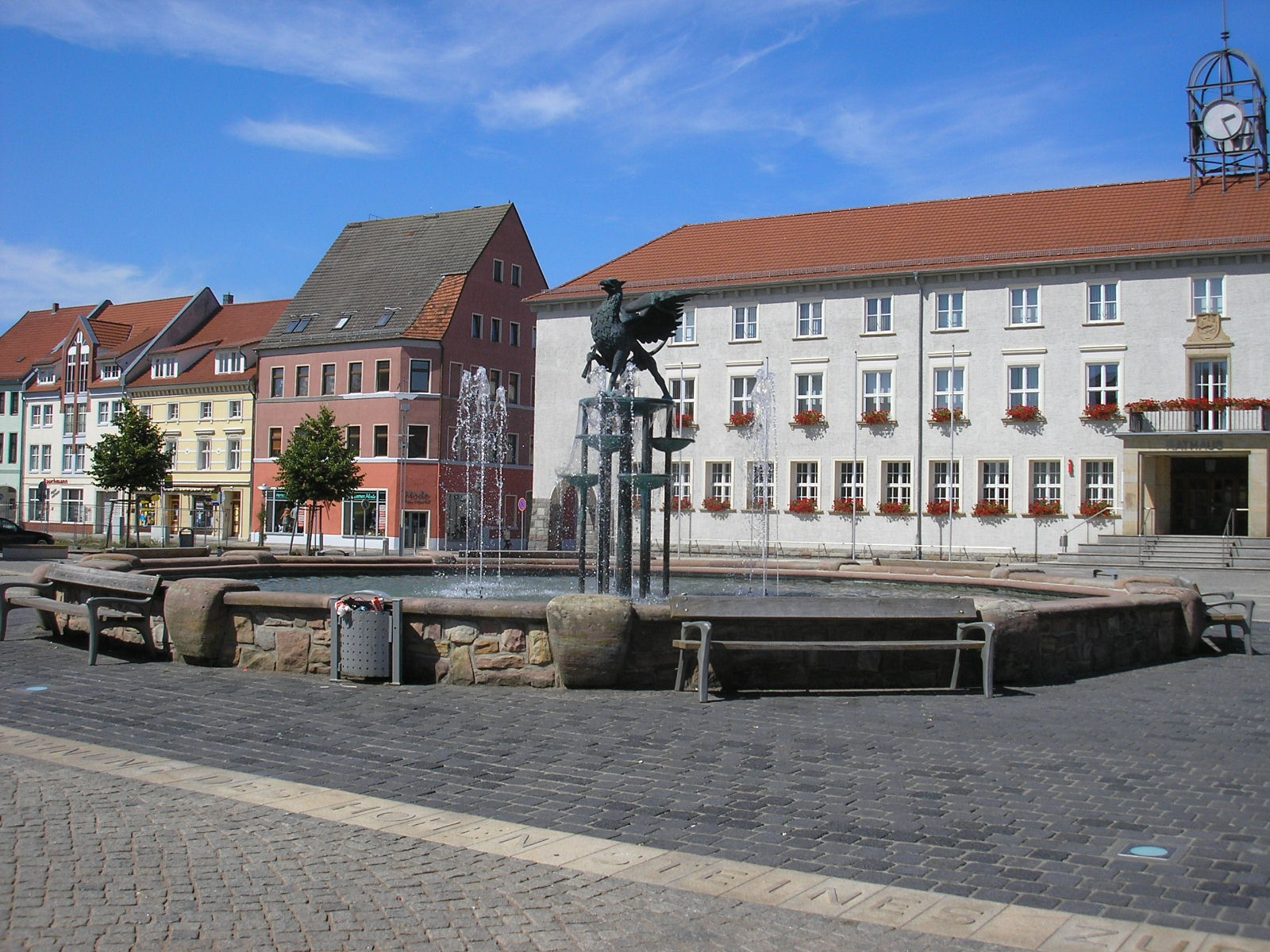
- Market square

- Coat of arms

- Location of Anklam within Vorpommern-Greifswald district
- Interactive map of Anklam
- Location within Germany Location within Mecklenburg-Vorpommern
- Coordinates: 53°51′N 13°41′E
- Country: Germany
- State: Mecklenburg-Vorpommern
- District: Vorpommern-Greifswald

Government
  - Mayor: Michael Galander (Ind.)

Area
  - Total: 56.68 km^{2} (21.88 sq mi)
- Elevation: 5 m (16 ft)

Population (2025-12-31)
  - Total: 11,793
  - Density: 208.1/km^{2} (538.9/sq mi)
- Time zone: UTC+01:00 (CET)
  - Summer (DST): UTC+02:00 (CEST)
- Postal codes: 17389
- Dialling codes: 03971
- Vehicle registration: VG, ANK
- Website: www.anklam.de

Anklam (German pronunciation: [ˈaŋklam]), formerly known as Tanglim and Wendenburg, is a town in the Western Pomerania region of Mecklenburg-Vorpommern in north-eastern Germany. It is situated on the banks of the Peene river, just 8 km from its mouth in the Kleines Haff, the western part of the Szczecin Lagoon. Anklam has a population of 12,177 (2021) and was the capital of the former Ostvorpommern district. Since September 2011, it has been part of the district of Vorpommern-Greifswald.

== History ==
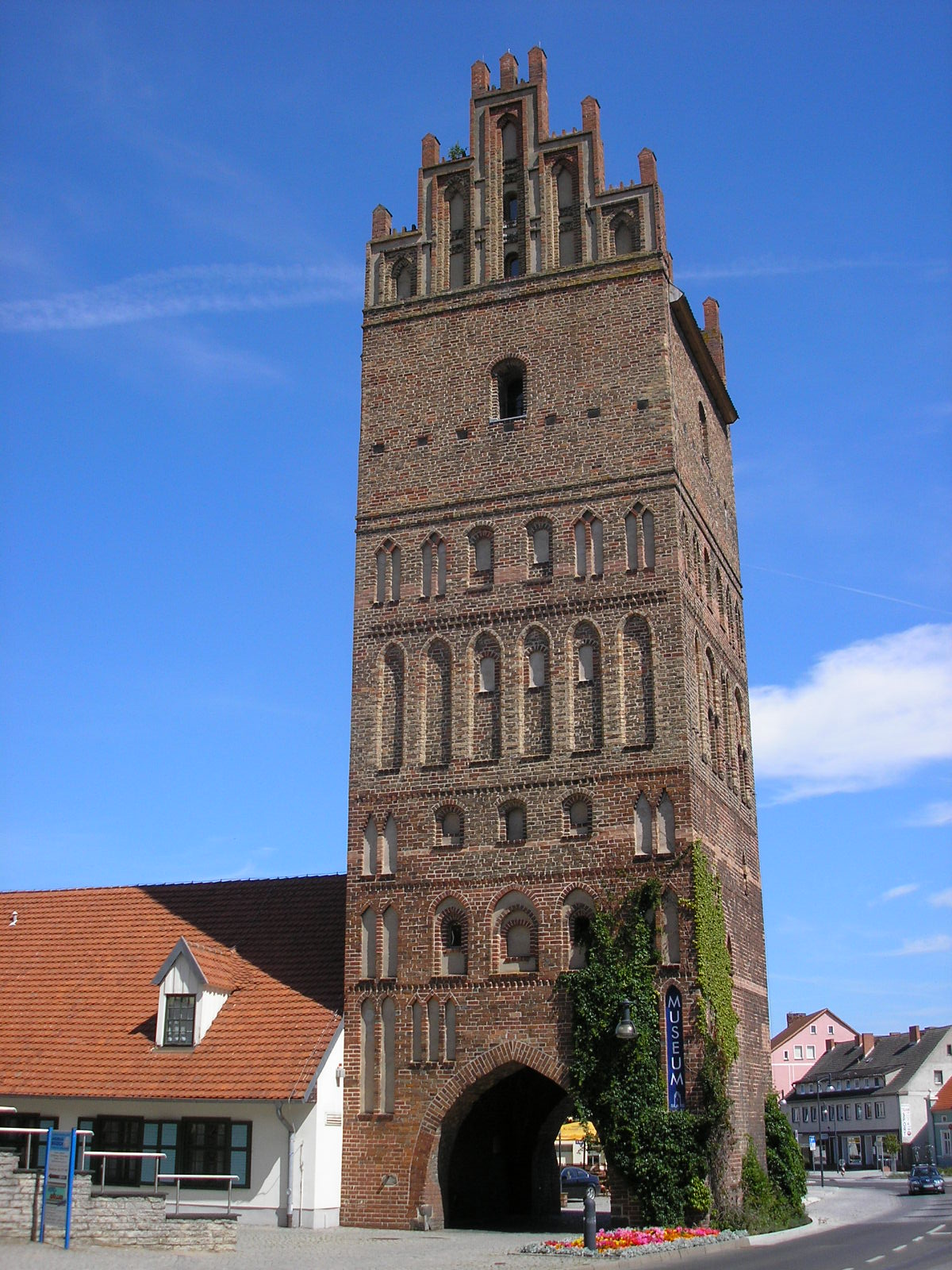
Brick Gothic Steintor

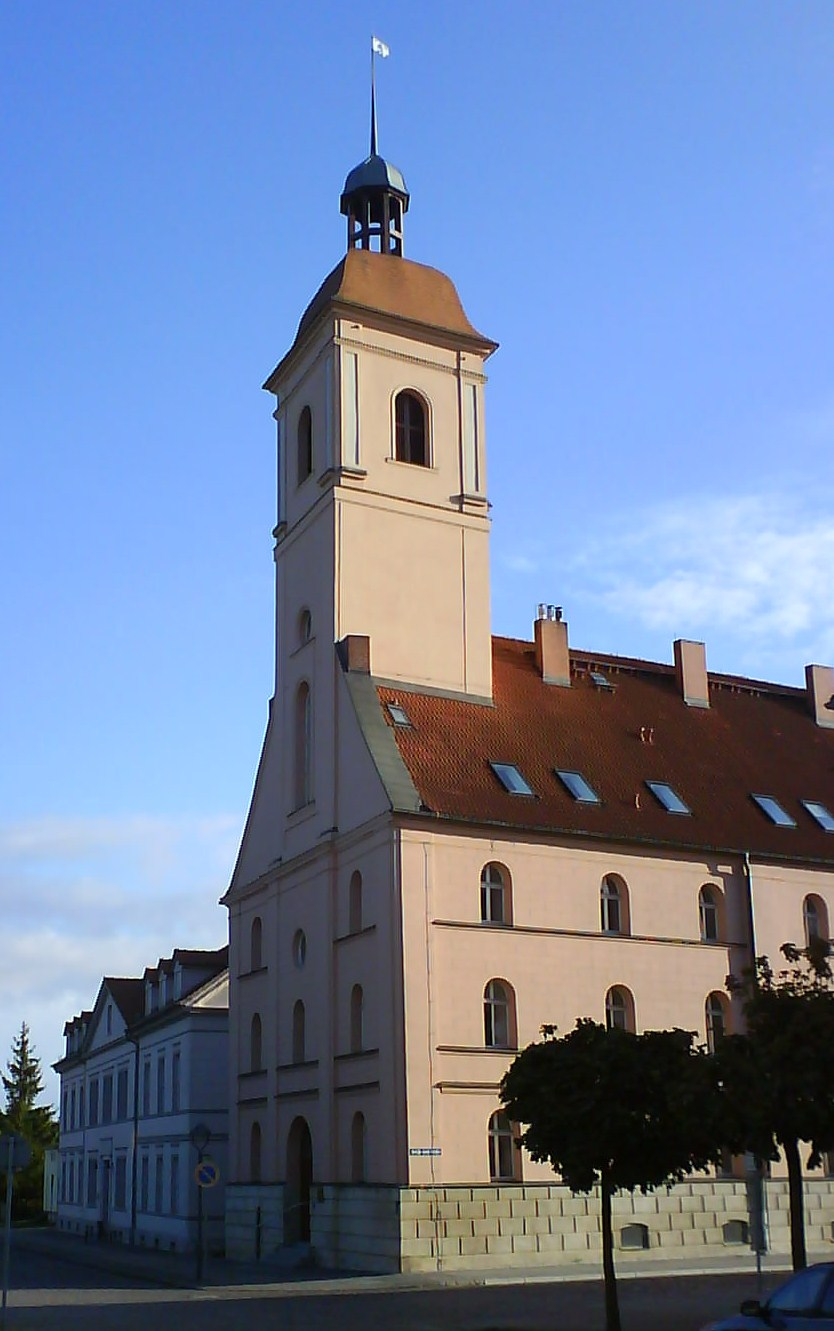
Garrison church of Anklam, evidence of Prussian tradition of the town

In the early Middle Ages, there was an important Scandinavian and Wendish settlement in the area near the present town now known as Altes Lager Menzlin. Anklam proper began as an associated Wendish fortress.

In the Middle Ages the town was a part of the Duchy of Pomerania. During the German expansion eastwards, the abandoned fortress was developed into a settlement named Tanglim after its new founder. The site possesses importance as the head of navigation on the Peene. It was elevated to town status in 1244 and became a member of the Hanseatic League the same year or in 1483. The town remained small and non-influential, but achieved a measure of wealth and prosperity with its membership.

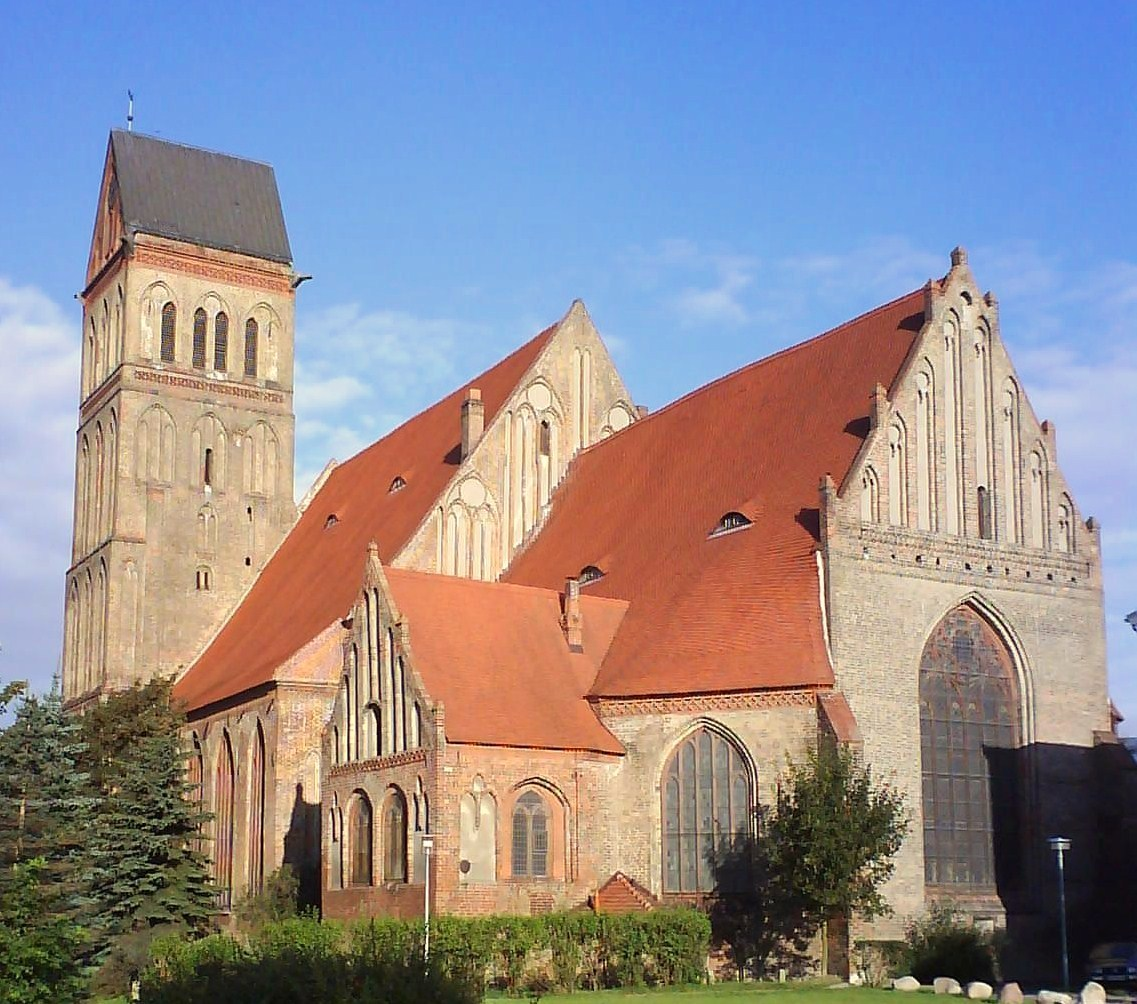
St. Mary in Anklam

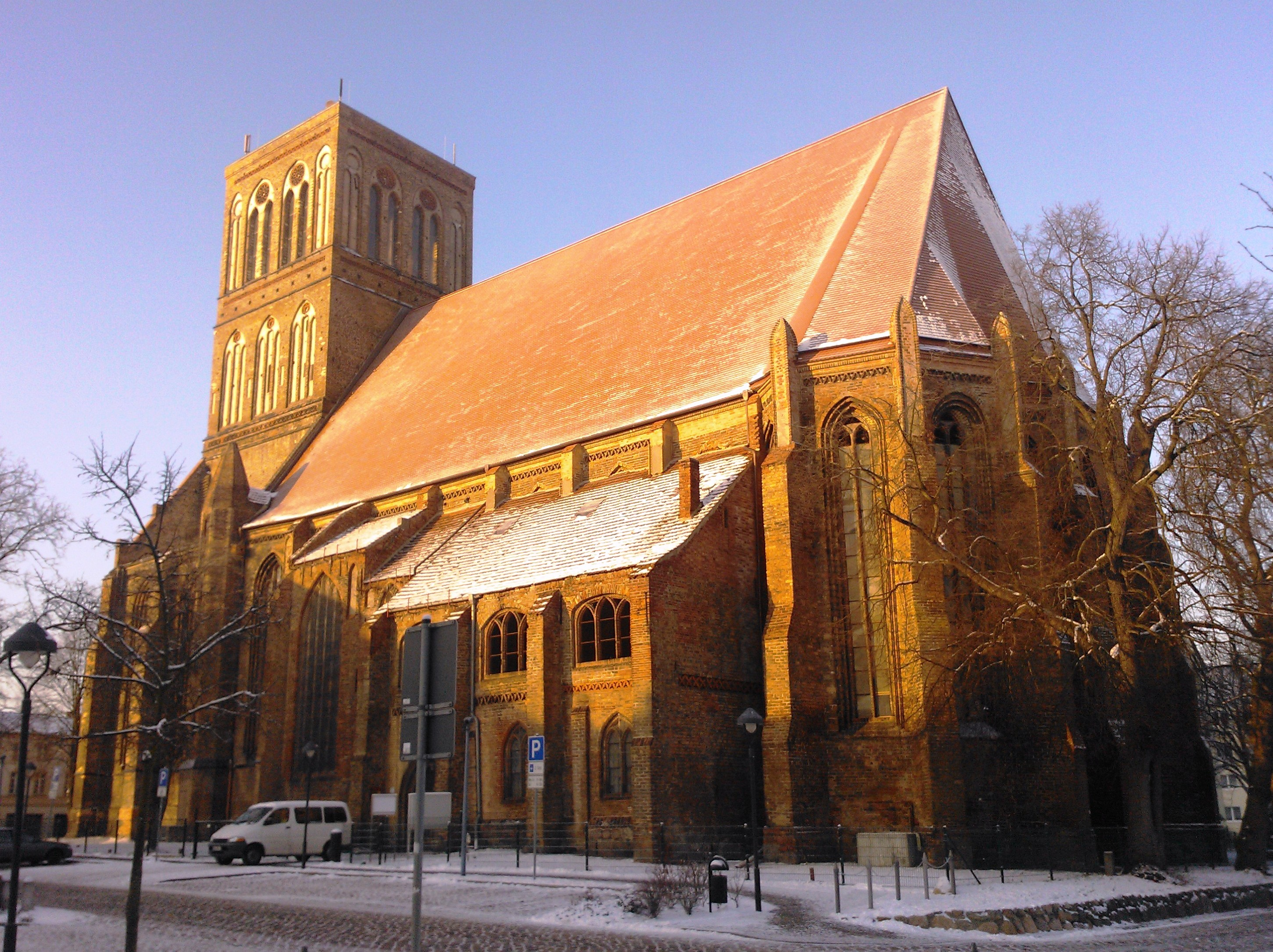
St. Nicholas, being reconstructed, 2012

As a town of considerable military importance, it suffered greatly during the Thirty Years' War when Swedish and Imperial troops battled over it across a twenty-year span. Amid this and subsequent wars, it also endured repeated outbreaks of fire and plague. It was occupied by imperial forces from 1627 to 1630, and thereafter by Swedish forces. After the war, Anklam became part of Swedish Pomerania in 1648. In 1676, it was captured by Frederick William of Brandenburg.

In 1713, Anklam was looted by soldiers of the Tsardom of Russia. That it was not burned to the ground, as ordered by Peter the Great, was in large part due to the resistance of Christian Thomesen Carl ("Carlson"), after whom a street is named in remembrance. The southern parts of the town were ceded to Prussia by the 1720 Treaty of Stockholm, while a smaller section north of the Peene remained Swedish. It was damaged again during the Seven Years' War in the 1750s and 1760s, with its fortifications being effectively dismantled in 1762. Sweden yielded its remaining part of the town in 1815, when all of Western Pomerania became part of the Prussian province of Pomerania.

In the 19th century, Anklam was connected with Berlin and Stettin (Szczecin) by rail and developed its manufacture of linen and woolen goods, leather, beer, and soap. Its 1871 population was 10,739, which had risen to 14,602 by the turn of the century. By the time of the First World War, it possessed a military school and developed iron foundries and sugar factories. In 1939 the Wehrmacht took over the military school and constructed a military prison on the grounds. In September 1942, the FStGA 8 field penal battalion for Allied prisoners-of-war was established and afterwards relocated to the eastern front.

Anklam was nearly completely destroyed by several bombing raids of the U.S. Air Force in 1943 and 1944 and in the last days of World War II, when the advancing Soviets burned and leveled most of the town. During the final stages of the war, in February 1945, the German-perpetrated death march of Allied POWs from the Stalag XX-B POW camp passed through the town. After the war, Anklam became part of the East German state of Mecklenburg-Vorpommern, and after the dissolution of the province it was part of Bezirk Neubrandenburg from 1952 to 1990. The town was rebuilt in the rather uniform socialist style.

After the 1990 reunification of Germany, Anklam became part of the state of Mecklenburg-Vorpommern, re-created at that time.

== Population development ==
Year	1350	1600	1740	1765	1770	1790	1800	1875	1910	1939	1950	1981	1988	2003	2010	2016	2017	2021
Inhabitants	3.000	6.000	2.961	3.036	3.278	3.224	4.470	11.781	15.279	19.682	20.160	20.496	19.685	15.826	13.433	12.635	12.521	12.177

== Sights ==
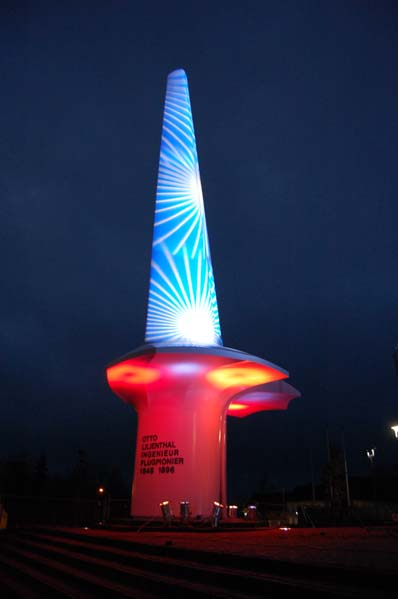
Memorial in front of the Otto-Lilienthal-Museum

Anklam was a prosperous medieval city but suffered severely during the Thirty Years' War, the Seven Years' War, and the Second World War, as well as from periodic fires. Nonetheless, Anklam has some significant buildings remaining. The 12th-century church of St Mary was rebuilt in the 15th century, had a modern spire added in the 19th, and was repaired in 1947.

== Museums ==
- Museum im Steintor (local history)
- Otto-Lilienthal-Museum

== Transport ==
Anklam is connected with the Autobahn 20 coastal highway.

- Anklam railway station is served by national and local services to Angermünde, Berlin, Dresden, Eberswalde, Frankfurt, Munich, Prague and Stralsund.

== Notable people ==
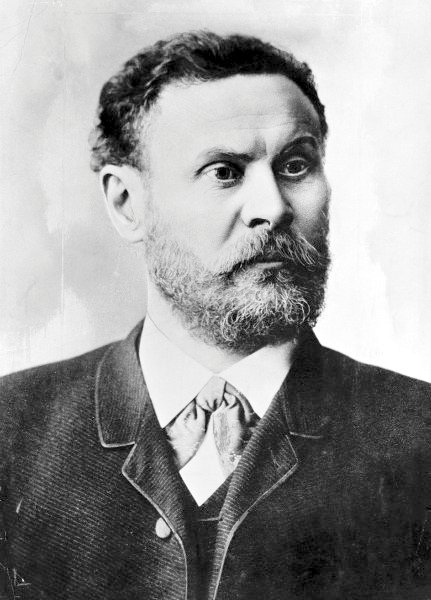
Otto Lilienthal

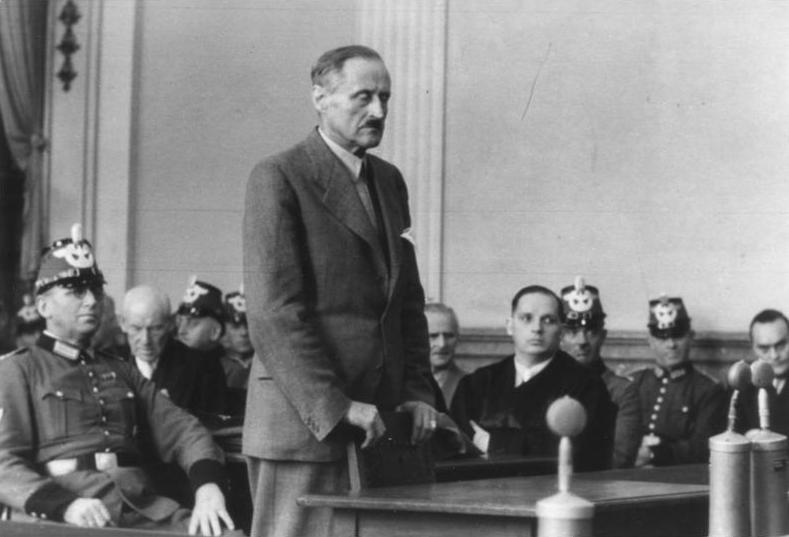
Ulrich von Hassell in 1944 before the Volksgerichtshof

- Johann Franz Buddeus (1667–1729), philosopher, theologian, professor in Halle and Jena.
- Paschen von Cossel (1714–1805), lawyer, imperial vicar, canon of the cathedral chapter Hamburger
- Friedrich Albrecht Karl Herrmann, Reichsgraf von Wylich und Lottum (1720–1797), Prussian officer
- Carl August Wilhelm Berends (1759–1826), physician, head of the Charité
- Ludwig von Henk (1820–1894), Vice Admiral of the Imperial Navy, member of Reichstag
- Otto Lilienthal (1848–1896), aviation pioneer
- Gustav Lilienthal (1849–1933), architect and social reformer
- Johanna Gadski (1872–1932), opera singer
- Julius Urgiß, (1873–1948), German-Jewish screenwriter and critic for Kinematograph
- Heinrich Sahm (1877–1939) a German lawyer, mayor of the Free City of Danzig
- Ulrich von Hassell, (1881–1944), German diplomat and anti-Nazi
- Kurt von Briesen (1886–1941), a German officer, most recently General of Infantry in WWII
- Alice Hechy (1893–1973), a German stage and film actress
- Günter Schabowski (1929–2015), politician (SED)
- Dixon (born Steffen Berkhahn in 1975), house and techno DJ, producer and label manager
- Matthias Schweighöfer, (born 1981), a German actor, voice actor, film director and producer.

=== Sport ===
- Peter Hein (born 1943), a German rower, competed at the 1968 Summer Olympics
- Sandro Stallbaum (born 1981), a retired German footballer, played 336 games
- Florian Stritzel (born 1994), a German footballer currently playing for SV Wehen Wiesbaden

== International relations ==
Anklam is twinned with:

Burlöv, Sweden; Heide, Germany	Limbaži, Latvia; Ustka, Poland

== See also ==
- Swedish Pomerania
