= Danneberg =

Danneberg is a German surname. Notable people with the surname include:

- Robert Danneberg (1882–1942), Austrian politician
- Thomas Danneberg (1942–2023), German actor

== Sports ==
- Jochen Danneberg (born 1953), East German ski jumper
- Rolf Danneberg (born 1953), German athlete in field events
- Tim Danneberg (born 1986), German footballer

== See also ==
- Dannenberg (disambiguation)
