= Peter Dannenberg =

Peter Dannenberg (21 May 1930 – 9 March 2015) was a German musicologist, music writer and opera director.

== Life ==
Danneneberg was born in Potsdam. After studying in Kiel and Freiburg in Br., Dannenberg was a feature editor in Kiel. From 1969 he then became editor-in-chief and music critic in charge of Die Welt; from 1974 he held the same position at the Stuttgarter Zeitung. He was a permanent contributor to most German radio stations, the magazine Opernwelt and other periodicals. From 1977 to 1986 he worked under the artistic direction of Christoph von Dohnányi as chief dramaturg of the Hamburg State Opera and at the same time director of the experimental stage of Opera Stabile with numerous world premieres in opera and concert, and also by Wolfgang Rihm, Heinz Holliger, Manfred Trojahn, Wilhelm Killmayer, Aribert Reimann, Günter Bialas, Isang Yun, Rolf Liebermann and Udo Zimmermann. From 1987 to 1990 he was deputy artistic director of the Oper Frankfurt, from 1990 to 1995 general director of the Stages of the State Capital Kiel and from 1995 to 2004 finally artistic director of the Hamburger Symphoniker.

From 1989 Dannenberg was chairman for life of the Alexander Zemlinsky Fund at the Gesellschaft der Musikfreunde in Vienna. From 1990 to 1997 he was deputy chairman of the Landeskulturverband Schleswig-Holstein.

Dannenberg died after a long illness in the night of 10 March 2015 at the age of 84 years in Kronshagen, Schleswig-Holstein.

== Awards ==
- 2000 Biermann-Ratjen-Medaille of the Free and Hanseatic City of Hamburg for services to art and culture in Hamburg
- 2003 Austrian Decoration for Science and Art I. classe

== Publications ==
- Das kleine Schumann-Buch. Salzburg, 1979, and Hamburg, 1983.
- Gaukler und Primadonnen. Vom Ballhaus zum Stadttheater im alten Kiel. Hamburg, o. J.
- Helden und Chargen. Zwischen den Kriegen – Dreißig Jahre Theater in Kiel. Hamburg, o. J.
- Edited together with Max W. Busch: Die Hamburgische Staatsoper. 2 volumes. Volume I: 1678 bis 1945 Bürgeroper-Stadt-Theater-Staatsoper. Volume II: 1945 bis 1988. Nachkrieg und Gegenwart. Zürich, 1988/89.
- Immer wenn es Abend wird. Dreihundert Jahre Theater in Kiel. Hamburg, 1983.
- Extensive contribution to Halte fest, was Dir von allem übrigblieb. 100 Jahre Theater am Kleinen Kiel. Edited by Ole Hruschka. Kiel, 2007.
- Contribution to Das Schöne, das Schreckliche am Theater ist seine Vergänglichkeit in OFFEN SEIN ZU – HÖREN. Der Dirigent Christoph von Dohnányi. Published by Klaus Schultz. Hamburg, 2010.
