= Dannenberg =

Dannenberg may refer to:

== Places ==
- Dannenberg (Elbe), a town in Germany
- County of Dannenberg, a medieval fief founded by Henry the Lion
- Dannenberg, Pommern, German name of Domysłów, modern Poland

== Other uses ==
- Dannenberg (surname)
