= Komödie Winterhuder Fährhaus =

Theater in Hamburg, Germany

Coordinates: 53°35′38″N 9°59′39″E

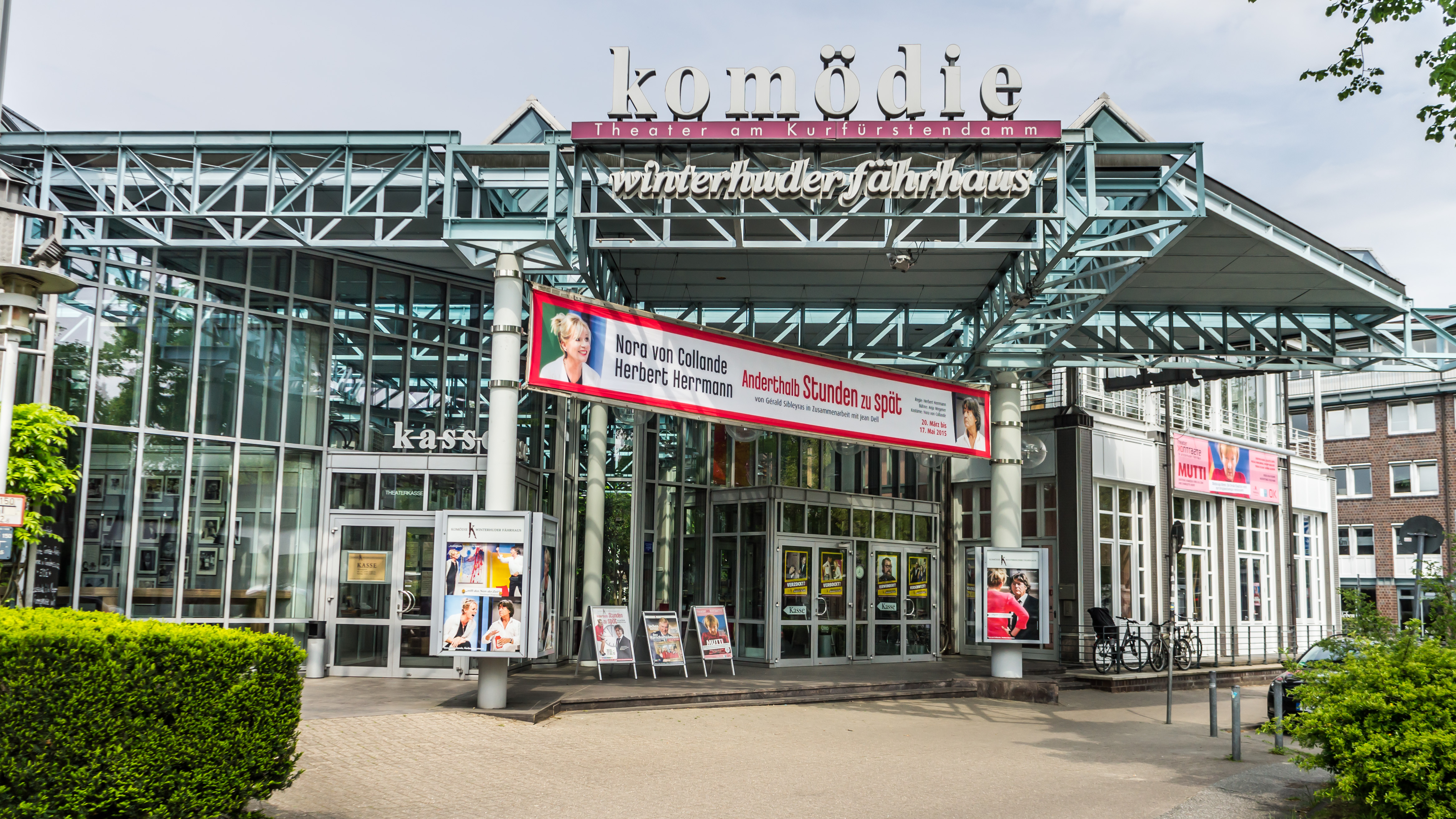
Komödie Winterhuder Fährhaus

Komödie Winterhuder Fährhaus is a theatre in Hamburg, Germany.
