= Hansa-Theater (Hamburg) =

Theatre in Hamburg, Germany

Coordinates: 53°33′12″N 10°00′42″E

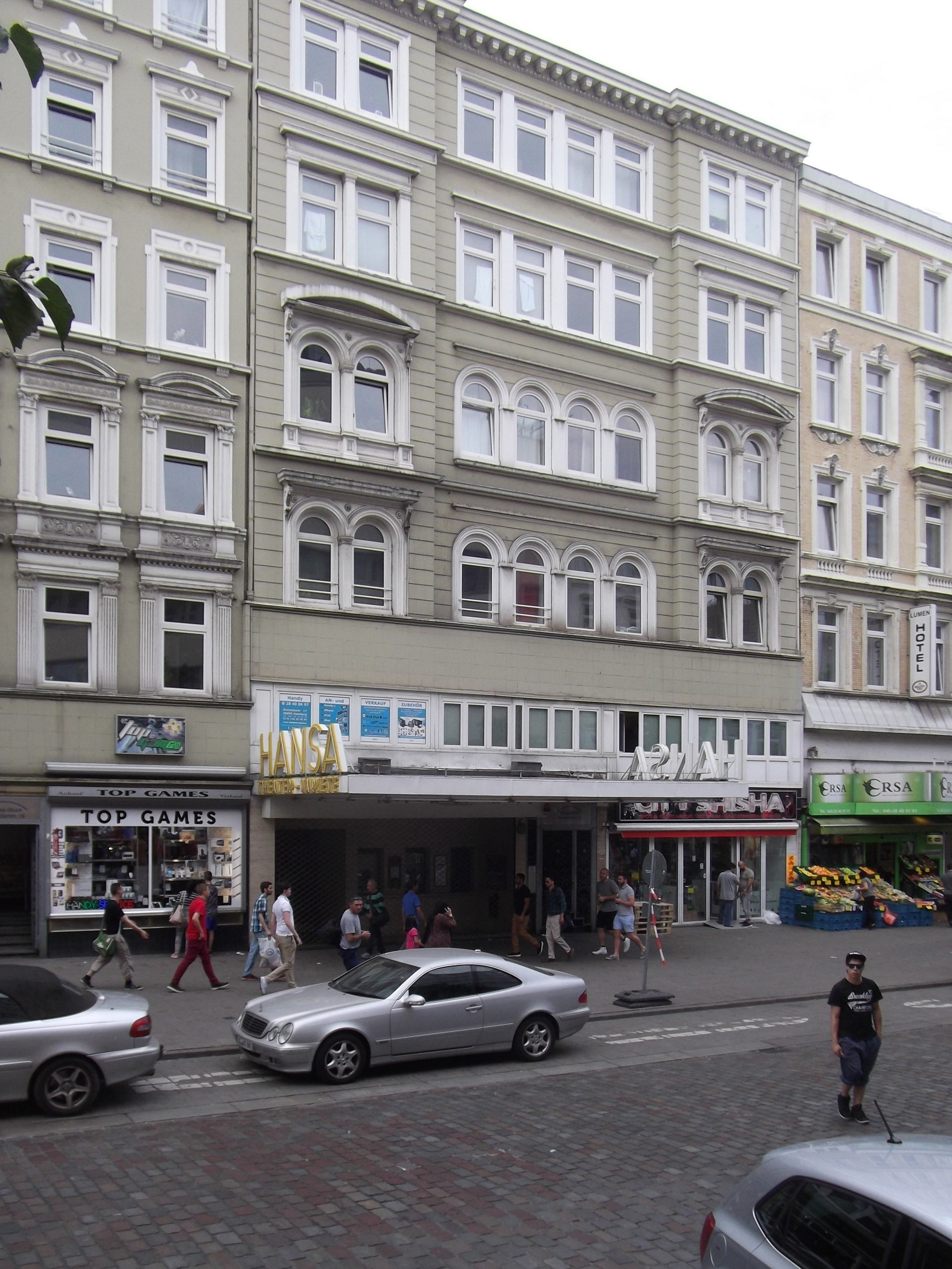
Hansa-Theater

Hansa-Theater is a theatre in the St. Georg quarter of Hamburg, Germany.

Steeped in fine decor, the theater reopened in 2009 following years of neglect. It brings a “modern concept” of Cabaret and vaudeville performances, and is one of the most popular venues in Hamburg for the former. It is proximate to the Hamburg Central Station.

The building's interior design is listed as an historical monument.

== Television broadcasts ==
- Hansa-Theater Varieté: 5. März 1894 aired December 2001 (75 minutes NDR-Dokumentation von Gisela Tuchtenhagen aus dem Jahr 2003 über die Geschichte und die letzten vier Monate des Hansa Theaters, mit vielen Aufnahmen hinter den Kulissen, bei Artisten, aber auch in Service, Küche und Technik)
