= List of minor planets: 458001–459000 =

The following is a partial list of minor planets, running from minor-planet number 458001 through 459000, inclusive. The primary data for this and other partial lists is based on JPL's "Small-Body Orbital Elements" and data available from the Minor Planet Center. Critical list information is also provided by the MPC, unless otherwise specified from Lowell Observatory. A detailed description of the table's columns and additional sources are given on the main page including a complete list of every page in this series, and a statistical break-up on the dynamical classification of minor planets.

Also see the summary list of all named bodies in numerical and alphabetical order, and the corresponding naming citations for the number range of this particular list. New namings may only be added to this list after official publication, as the preannouncement of names is condemned by the Working Group for Small Bodies Nomenclature of the International Astronomical Union.

Near-Earth obj.	MBA (inner)	MBA (outer)	Centaur
Mars-crosser	MBA (middle)	Jupiter trojan	Trans-Neptunian obj.
Unclassified

== 458001–458100 ==
Designation			Discovery			Properties		Ref
Permanent	Provisional	Named after	Date	Site	Discoverer(s)	Category	Diam.	Ref
458001	2009 WR_{70}	—	November 18, 2009	Kitt Peak	Spacewatch	·	1.7 km	MPC · JPL
458002	2009 WK_{76}	—	October 25, 2009	Kitt Peak	Spacewatch	EOS	1.7 km	MPC · JPL
458003	2009 WL_{82}	—	November 19, 2009	Kitt Peak	Spacewatch	·	2.0 km	MPC · JPL
458004	2009 WM_{84}	—	November 19, 2009	Kitt Peak	Spacewatch	·	2.4 km	MPC · JPL
458005	2009 WJ_{85}	—	November 11, 2009	Kitt Peak	Spacewatch	·	2.2 km	MPC · JPL
458006	2009 WK_{85}	—	November 19, 2009	Kitt Peak	Spacewatch	·	2.8 km	MPC · JPL
458007	2009 WJ_{88}	—	November 19, 2009	Kitt Peak	Spacewatch	KOR	1.3 km	MPC · JPL
458008	2009 WB_{90}	—	November 19, 2009	Kitt Peak	Spacewatch	·	3.8 km	MPC · JPL
458009	2009 WY_{91}	—	November 19, 2009	Mount Lemmon	Mount Lemmon Survey	·	3.5 km	MPC · JPL
458010	2009 WW_{92}	—	November 19, 2009	Kitt Peak	Spacewatch	·	3.2 km	MPC · JPL
458011	2009 WQ_{99}	—	October 24, 2009	Kitt Peak	Spacewatch	·	2.1 km	MPC · JPL
458012	2009 WW_{105}	—	November 22, 2009	Mount Lemmon	Mount Lemmon Survey	·	760 m	MPC · JPL
458013	2009 WN_{120}	—	October 22, 2009	Mount Lemmon	Mount Lemmon Survey	·	1.6 km	MPC · JPL
458014	2009 WP_{120}	—	November 20, 2009	Kitt Peak	Spacewatch	VER	2.5 km	MPC · JPL
458015	2009 WC_{128}	—	November 20, 2009	Kitt Peak	Spacewatch	HYG	3.2 km	MPC · JPL
458016	2009 WN_{139}	—	February 27, 2006	Kitt Peak	Spacewatch	·	2.7 km	MPC · JPL
458017	2009 WN_{140}	—	October 14, 2009	Mount Lemmon	Mount Lemmon Survey	EOS	3.0 km	MPC · JPL
458018	2009 WJ_{143}	—	September 21, 2009	Mount Lemmon	Mount Lemmon Survey	·	3.8 km	MPC · JPL
458019	2009 WU_{143}	—	September 22, 2009	Mount Lemmon	Mount Lemmon Survey	·	2.0 km	MPC · JPL
458020	2009 WD_{146}	—	November 19, 2009	Catalina	CSS	H	620 m	MPC · JPL
458021	2009 WB_{148}	—	November 19, 2009	Mount Lemmon	Mount Lemmon Survey	VER	3.7 km	MPC · JPL
458022	2009 WC_{149}	—	November 19, 2009	Mount Lemmon	Mount Lemmon Survey	·	2.8 km	MPC · JPL
458023	2009 WU_{156}	—	October 27, 2009	Mount Lemmon	Mount Lemmon Survey	EOS	1.6 km	MPC · JPL
458024	2009 WV_{160}	—	November 21, 2009	Kitt Peak	Spacewatch	·	2.6 km	MPC · JPL
458025	2009 WU_{177}	—	November 23, 2009	Kitt Peak	Spacewatch	·	5.5 km	MPC · JPL
458026	2009 WB_{179}	—	October 18, 1998	Kitt Peak	Spacewatch	·	2.3 km	MPC · JPL
458027	2009 WR_{179}	—	November 23, 2009	Kitt Peak	Spacewatch	AGN	1.2 km	MPC · JPL
458028	2009 WO_{181}	—	November 23, 2009	Kitt Peak	Spacewatch	EOS	1.8 km	MPC · JPL
458029	2009 WE_{183}	—	November 11, 2009	Kitt Peak	Spacewatch	·	3.7 km	MPC · JPL
458030	2009 WD_{184}	—	October 1, 2003	Kitt Peak	Spacewatch	EOS	2.0 km	MPC · JPL
458031	2009 WD_{190}	—	November 24, 2009	Kitt Peak	Spacewatch	·	1.9 km	MPC · JPL
458032	2009 WF_{196}	—	November 25, 2009	Mount Lemmon	Mount Lemmon Survey	·	2.9 km	MPC · JPL
458033	2009 WS_{199}	—	January 7, 1999	Kitt Peak	Spacewatch	·	2.5 km	MPC · JPL
458034	2009 WY_{205}	—	September 20, 2009	Mount Lemmon	Mount Lemmon Survey	EOS	2.0 km	MPC · JPL
458035	2009 WQ_{206}	—	November 17, 2009	Kitt Peak	Spacewatch	·	2.2 km	MPC · JPL
458036	2009 WD_{212}	—	November 18, 2009	Kitt Peak	Spacewatch	·	2.6 km	MPC · JPL
458037	2009 WK_{212}	—	November 18, 2009	Kitt Peak	Spacewatch	·	3.6 km	MPC · JPL
458038	2009 WN_{212}	—	November 18, 2009	Kitt Peak	Spacewatch	EOS	1.9 km	MPC · JPL
458039	2009 WQ_{214}	—	November 20, 2009	Kitt Peak	Spacewatch	·	2.2 km	MPC · JPL
458040	2009 WQ_{219}	—	September 19, 2009	Mount Lemmon	Mount Lemmon Survey	EOS	1.4 km	MPC · JPL
458041	2009 WP_{221}	—	November 16, 2009	Mount Lemmon	Mount Lemmon Survey	·	1.9 km	MPC · JPL
458042	2009 WX_{223}	—	November 16, 2009	Mount Lemmon	Mount Lemmon Survey	EOS	1.9 km	MPC · JPL
458043	2009 WP_{225}	—	October 24, 2009	Kitt Peak	Spacewatch	KOR	1.2 km	MPC · JPL
458044	2009 WY_{226}	—	October 23, 2009	Mount Lemmon	Mount Lemmon Survey	·	2.2 km	MPC · JPL
458045	2009 WF_{229}	—	October 26, 2009	Kitt Peak	Spacewatch	·	2.9 km	MPC · JPL
458046	2009 WG_{234}	—	November 18, 2009	Mount Lemmon	Mount Lemmon Survey	NAE	1.9 km	MPC · JPL
458047	2009 WH_{235}	—	October 22, 2009	Mount Lemmon	Mount Lemmon Survey	·	2.0 km	MPC · JPL
458048	2009 WV_{242}	—	September 28, 2003	Kitt Peak	Spacewatch	·	1.7 km	MPC · JPL
458049	2009 WO_{246}	—	November 16, 2009	Kitt Peak	Spacewatch	·	2.4 km	MPC · JPL
458050	2009 WU_{246}	—	November 11, 2009	Kitt Peak	Spacewatch	·	2.5 km	MPC · JPL
458051	2009 WW_{249}	—	November 17, 2009	Kitt Peak	Spacewatch	·	2.6 km	MPC · JPL
458052	2009 WL_{256}	—	November 24, 2009	Kitt Peak	Spacewatch	·	3.4 km	MPC · JPL
458053	2009 WO_{257}	—	November 17, 2009	Kitt Peak	Spacewatch	T_{j} (2.99)	4.6 km	MPC · JPL
458054	2009 WY_{259}	—	November 17, 2009	Kitt Peak	Spacewatch	VER	2.5 km	MPC · JPL
458055	2009 WU_{260}	—	November 25, 2009	Kitt Peak	Spacewatch	THM	1.8 km	MPC · JPL
458056	2009 WH_{263}	—	November 16, 2009	Mount Lemmon	Mount Lemmon Survey	·	3.8 km	MPC · JPL
458057	2009 XR	—	November 26, 2009	Mount Lemmon	Mount Lemmon Survey	·	2.1 km	MPC · JPL
458058	2009 XB_{6}	—	November 22, 2009	Kitt Peak	Spacewatch	·	2.9 km	MPC · JPL
458059	2009 XB_{15}	—	November 11, 2009	Mount Lemmon	Mount Lemmon Survey	EOS	1.9 km	MPC · JPL
458060	2009 XE_{15}	—	December 15, 2009	Mount Lemmon	Mount Lemmon Survey	·	3.1 km	MPC · JPL
458061	2009 XV_{23}	—	December 25, 2009	Kitt Peak	Spacewatch	·	2.4 km	MPC · JPL
458062	2009 YO	—	December 18, 2009	Mount Lemmon	Mount Lemmon Survey	APO	600 m	MPC · JPL
458063 Gustavomuler	2009 YB_{7}	Gustavomuler	December 21, 2009	Tzec Maun	E. Schwab	·	3.6 km	MPC · JPL
458064	2009 YT_{8}	—	December 16, 2009	Mount Lemmon	Mount Lemmon Survey	LIX	3.4 km	MPC · JPL
458065	2009 YW_{11}	—	December 18, 2009	Mount Lemmon	Mount Lemmon Survey	·	3.0 km	MPC · JPL
458066	2009 YD_{18}	—	December 19, 2009	Kitt Peak	Spacewatch	·	3.5 km	MPC · JPL
458067	2009 YR_{18}	—	September 22, 2009	Mount Lemmon	Mount Lemmon Survey	·	2.6 km	MPC · JPL
458068	2009 YR_{21}	—	March 13, 2005	Mount Lemmon	Mount Lemmon Survey	EOS	1.7 km	MPC · JPL
458069	2009 YS_{21}	—	December 19, 2009	Mount Lemmon	Mount Lemmon Survey	EOS	2.3 km	MPC · JPL
458070	2010 AB_{2}	—	December 20, 2004	Mount Lemmon	Mount Lemmon Survey	·	3.8 km	MPC · JPL
458071	2010 AP_{4}	—	November 27, 2009	Mount Lemmon	Mount Lemmon Survey	·	3.7 km	MPC · JPL
458072	2010 AY_{9}	—	November 22, 2009	Kitt Peak	Spacewatch	·	3.5 km	MPC · JPL
458073	2010 AH_{10}	—	December 18, 2009	Mount Lemmon	Mount Lemmon Survey	·	2.8 km	MPC · JPL
458074	2010 AJ_{13}	—	December 20, 2009	Mount Lemmon	Mount Lemmon Survey	·	3.2 km	MPC · JPL
458075	2010 AG_{21}	—	March 10, 2005	Mount Lemmon	Mount Lemmon Survey	THM	2.1 km	MPC · JPL
458076	2010 AQ_{22}	—	September 28, 2009	Mount Lemmon	Mount Lemmon Survey	·	3.8 km	MPC · JPL
458077	2010 AW_{23}	—	January 6, 2010	Kitt Peak	Spacewatch	·	2.7 km	MPC · JPL
458078	2010 AR_{41}	—	November 22, 2003	Catalina	CSS	·	2.4 km	MPC · JPL
458079	2010 AH_{44}	—	December 20, 2009	Mount Lemmon	Mount Lemmon Survey	·	3.4 km	MPC · JPL
458080	2010 AN_{46}	—	November 16, 2009	Mount Lemmon	Mount Lemmon Survey	·	3.5 km	MPC · JPL
458081	2010 AZ_{48}	—	January 8, 2010	Kitt Peak	Spacewatch	·	3.5 km	MPC · JPL
458082	2010 AW_{49}	—	January 8, 2010	Kitt Peak	Spacewatch	ELF	4.7 km	MPC · JPL
458083	2010 AS_{52}	—	January 8, 2010	Mount Lemmon	Mount Lemmon Survey	·	4.6 km	MPC · JPL
458084	2010 AS_{60}	—	November 20, 2009	Mount Lemmon	Mount Lemmon Survey	·	2.6 km	MPC · JPL
458085	2010 AE_{61}	—	January 10, 2010	Socorro	LINEAR	THB	3.3 km	MPC · JPL
458086	2010 AS_{62}	—	January 8, 2010	Kitt Peak	Spacewatch	·	3.7 km	MPC · JPL
458087	2010 AY_{62}	—	January 8, 2010	Catalina	CSS	·	1.8 km	MPC · JPL
458088	2010 AO_{66}	—	January 11, 2010	Kitt Peak	Spacewatch	·	2.9 km	MPC · JPL
458089	2010 AJ_{72}	—	January 13, 2010	Mount Lemmon	Mount Lemmon Survey	·	3.4 km	MPC · JPL
458090	2010 AK_{74}	—	December 20, 2009	Kitt Peak	Spacewatch	T_{j} (2.99)	4.3 km	MPC · JPL
458091	2010 AO_{74}	—	December 15, 2009	Catalina	CSS	·	4.8 km	MPC · JPL
458092	2010 AM_{76}	—	January 6, 2010	Catalina	CSS	·	4.0 km	MPC · JPL
458093	2010 AU_{91}	—	March 10, 2010	La Sagra	OAM	T_{j} (2.98) · 3:2	5.7 km	MPC · JPL
458094	2010 AM_{95}	—	January 9, 2010	WISE	WISE	·	4.2 km	MPC · JPL
458095	2010 BW_{19}	—	September 29, 2009	Mount Lemmon	Mount Lemmon Survey	·	1.7 km	MPC · JPL
458096	2010 BY_{24}	—	December 15, 1999	Kitt Peak	Spacewatch	·	3.6 km	MPC · JPL
458097	2010 BK_{56}	—	January 20, 2010	WISE	WISE	·	2.9 km	MPC · JPL
458098	2010 BV_{79}	—	October 23, 2009	Mount Lemmon	Mount Lemmon Survey	·	3.2 km	MPC · JPL
458099	2010 BZ_{105}	—	June 30, 2008	Kitt Peak	Spacewatch	·	4.4 km	MPC · JPL
458100	2010 BO_{126}	—	October 21, 2009	Mount Lemmon	Mount Lemmon Survey	·	3.6 km	MPC · JPL

== 458101–458200 ==
back to top

Designation			Discovery			Properties		Ref
Permanent	Provisional	Named after	Date	Site	Discoverer(s)	Category	Diam.	Ref
458101	2010 CS_{11}	—	January 6, 2005	Catalina	CSS	·	3.2 km	MPC · JPL
458102	2010 CT_{23}	—	January 6, 2010	Kitt Peak	Spacewatch	URS	5.9 km	MPC · JPL
458103	2010 CQ_{24}	—	February 9, 2010	Mount Lemmon	Mount Lemmon Survey	·	2.9 km	MPC · JPL
458104	2010 CK_{27}	—	November 21, 2009	Mount Lemmon	Mount Lemmon Survey	·	3.0 km	MPC · JPL
458105	2010 CM_{40}	—	February 13, 2010	Mount Lemmon	Mount Lemmon Survey	·	2.5 km	MPC · JPL
458106	2010 CG_{41}	—	February 5, 2010	Kitt Peak	Spacewatch	·	3.2 km	MPC · JPL
458107	2010 CK_{55}	—	October 27, 2009	Kitt Peak	Spacewatch	·	5.1 km	MPC · JPL
458108	2010 CU_{55}	—	February 12, 2010	Socorro	LINEAR	T_{j} (2.97)	3.9 km	MPC · JPL
458109	2010 CP_{58}	—	February 21, 2006	Catalina	CSS	·	2.1 km	MPC · JPL
458110	2010 CF_{61}	—	September 29, 2008	Mount Lemmon	Mount Lemmon Survey	·	2.6 km	MPC · JPL
458111	2010 CJ_{76}	—	January 8, 2010	Mount Lemmon	Mount Lemmon Survey	·	4.4 km	MPC · JPL
458112	2010 CS_{113}	—	April 2, 2005	Mount Lemmon	Mount Lemmon Survey	·	2.7 km	MPC · JPL
458113	2010 CP_{124}	—	February 15, 2010	Mount Lemmon	Mount Lemmon Survey	CYB	5.6 km	MPC · JPL
458114	2010 CC_{128}	—	February 7, 2010	La Sagra	OAM	·	2.7 km	MPC · JPL
458115	2010 CH_{128}	—	February 9, 2010	Catalina	CSS	·	2.5 km	MPC · JPL
458116	2010 DA	—	February 16, 2010	Siding Spring	SSS	APO · PHA	310 m	MPC · JPL
458117	2010 DN_{42}	—	February 17, 2010	Kitt Peak	Spacewatch	·	3.2 km	MPC · JPL
458118	2010 DC_{45}	—	August 29, 2006	Kitt Peak	Spacewatch	(260) · CYB	3.3 km	MPC · JPL
458119	2010 DO_{70}	—	November 24, 2009	Kitt Peak	Spacewatch	·	3.8 km	MPC · JPL
458120	2010 DP_{78}	—	February 16, 2010	Catalina	CSS	·	5.2 km	MPC · JPL
458121	2010 EK_{7}	—	March 3, 2010	WISE	WISE	·	3.0 km	MPC · JPL
458122	2010 EW_{45}	—	March 15, 2010	Mount Lemmon	Mount Lemmon Survey	APO +1km · PHA	1.1 km	MPC · JPL
458123 Lydiabenecke	2010 EW_{82}	Lydiabenecke	March 12, 2010	Catalina	CSS	·	3.0 km	MPC · JPL
458124	2010 ET_{84}	—	March 13, 2010	Mount Lemmon	Mount Lemmon Survey	·	3.5 km	MPC · JPL
458125	2010 EY_{105}	—	March 12, 2010	Catalina	CSS	·	4.7 km	MPC · JPL
458126	2010 ED_{131}	—	March 14, 2010	Kitt Peak	Spacewatch	·	500 m	MPC · JPL
458127	2010 EM_{137}	—	March 15, 2010	La Sagra	OAM	·	4.6 km	MPC · JPL
458128	2010 EX_{139}	—	March 12, 2010	Kitt Peak	Spacewatch	·	520 m	MPC · JPL
458129	2010 EA_{140}	—	March 14, 2010	Kitt Peak	Spacewatch	·	4.8 km	MPC · JPL
458130	2010 ES_{164}	—	December 17, 2009	Mount Lemmon	Mount Lemmon Survey	·	3.1 km	MPC · JPL
458131	2010 FY_{5}	—	March 17, 2010	Kitt Peak	Spacewatch	PHO	1.9 km	MPC · JPL
458132	2010 FU_{51}	—	March 2, 2005	Socorro	LINEAR	·	4.0 km	MPC · JPL
458133	2010 FA_{58}	—	December 20, 2009	Mount Lemmon	Mount Lemmon Survey	·	4.4 km	MPC · JPL
458134	2010 FV_{92}	—	March 21, 2010	Catalina	CSS	·	640 m	MPC · JPL
458135	2010 GE_{25}	—	April 1, 2010	WISE	WISE	AMO	300 m	MPC · JPL
458136	2010 GE_{95}	—	February 15, 2010	Catalina	CSS	·	3.6 km	MPC · JPL
458137	2010 GW_{135}	—	April 4, 2010	Kitt Peak	Spacewatch	·	640 m	MPC · JPL
458138	2010 HJ_{18}	—	April 18, 2010	WISE	WISE	PHO	2.3 km	MPC · JPL
458139	2010 HF_{27}	—	April 12, 2005	Kitt Peak	Spacewatch	·	3.7 km	MPC · JPL
458140	2010 HX_{49}	—	April 24, 2010	WISE	WISE	L5	13 km	MPC · JPL
458141	2010 HV_{58}	—	April 25, 2010	WISE	WISE	·	1.4 km	MPC · JPL
458142	2010 HS_{61}	—	April 26, 2010	WISE	WISE	·	2.9 km	MPC · JPL
458143	2010 HP_{84}	—	February 17, 2010	Mount Lemmon	Mount Lemmon Survey	·	5.0 km	MPC · JPL
458144	2010 HQ_{95}	—	April 30, 2010	WISE	WISE	THB	2.7 km	MPC · JPL
458145	2010 JH_{1}	—	May 1, 2010	WISE	WISE	·	1.6 km	MPC · JPL
458146	2010 JH_{28}	—	January 12, 2010	Mount Lemmon	Mount Lemmon Survey	CYB	4.5 km	MPC · JPL
458147	2010 JE_{30}	—	May 3, 2010	Kitt Peak	Spacewatch	·	690 m	MPC · JPL
458148	2010 JW_{38}	—	April 11, 2010	Mount Lemmon	Mount Lemmon Survey	·	660 m	MPC · JPL
458149	2010 JA_{48}	—	May 4, 2010	Kitt Peak	Spacewatch	·	1.1 km	MPC · JPL
458150	2010 JD_{57}	—	May 7, 2010	WISE	WISE	·	1.8 km	MPC · JPL
458151	2010 JF_{77}	—	May 11, 2010	Mount Lemmon	Mount Lemmon Survey	·	480 m	MPC · JPL
458152	2010 JP_{83}	—	April 11, 2010	Mount Lemmon	Mount Lemmon Survey	·	710 m	MPC · JPL
458153	2010 JP_{85}	—	May 7, 2010	Mount Lemmon	Mount Lemmon Survey	·	620 m	MPC · JPL
458154	2010 JR_{117}	—	May 7, 2010	Kitt Peak	Spacewatch	·	1.4 km	MPC · JPL
458155	2010 JT_{117}	—	March 2, 2009	Kitt Peak	Spacewatch	3:2	4.4 km	MPC · JPL
458156	2010 JO_{124}	—	May 12, 2010	WISE	WISE	·	4.7 km	MPC · JPL
458157	2010 JT_{155}	—	April 25, 2010	Kitt Peak	Spacewatch	·	850 m	MPC · JPL
458158	2010 JD_{159}	—	May 4, 2010	Kitt Peak	Spacewatch	EUN	930 m	MPC · JPL
458159	2010 KV_{6}	—	June 18, 2007	Kitt Peak	Spacewatch	·	4.9 km	MPC · JPL
458160	2010 KM_{36}	—	March 5, 2006	Kitt Peak	Spacewatch	V	630 m	MPC · JPL
458161	2010 KZ_{45}	—	October 23, 2006	Catalina	CSS	·	2.0 km	MPC · JPL
458162	2010 KG_{50}	—	May 22, 2010	WISE	WISE	·	1.7 km	MPC · JPL
458163	2010 KQ_{78}	—	May 25, 2010	WISE	WISE	·	2.0 km	MPC · JPL
458164	2010 KF_{110}	—	May 29, 2010	WISE	WISE	PHO	3.0 km	MPC · JPL
458165	2010 LU_{14}	—	June 3, 2010	Kitt Peak	Spacewatch	V	530 m	MPC · JPL
458166	2010 LB_{17}	—	June 2, 2010	WISE	WISE	·	2.3 km	MPC · JPL
458167	2010 LB_{52}	—	October 16, 2006	Catalina	CSS	·	2.1 km	MPC · JPL
458168	2010 LE_{84}	—	July 22, 2006	Mount Lemmon	Mount Lemmon Survey	ADE	2.0 km	MPC · JPL
458169	2010 LR_{100}	—	June 13, 2010	WISE	WISE	·	2.1 km	MPC · JPL
458170	2010 ME_{4}	—	June 19, 2010	Mount Lemmon	Mount Lemmon Survey	·	1.6 km	MPC · JPL
458171	2010 MK_{11}	—	June 17, 2010	WISE	WISE	·	2.0 km	MPC · JPL
458172	2010 MP_{17}	—	June 17, 2010	WISE	WISE	·	3.1 km	MPC · JPL
458173	2010 MH_{33}	—	June 20, 2010	WISE	WISE	·	1.9 km	MPC · JPL
458174	2010 MT_{49}	—	June 23, 2010	WISE	WISE	·	2.4 km	MPC · JPL
458175	2010 MW_{56}	—	June 24, 2010	WISE	WISE	·	2.3 km	MPC · JPL
458176	2010 MM_{71}	—	June 25, 2010	WISE	WISE	ERI	1.7 km	MPC · JPL
458177	2010 MF_{113}	—	June 24, 2010	Mount Lemmon	Mount Lemmon Survey	·	1.2 km	MPC · JPL
458178	2010 ND_{1}	—	July 6, 2010	Socorro	LINEAR	PHO	1.0 km	MPC · JPL
458179	2010 NQ_{4}	—	April 19, 2010	WISE	WISE	·	2.5 km	MPC · JPL
458180	2010 NW_{22}	—	July 6, 2010	WISE	WISE	KON	1.7 km	MPC · JPL
458181	2010 NH_{26}	—	July 7, 2010	WISE	WISE	·	3.5 km	MPC · JPL
458182	2010 NC_{49}	—	January 27, 2007	Kitt Peak	Spacewatch	·	1.7 km	MPC · JPL
458183	2010 NF_{50}	—	July 9, 2010	WISE	WISE	·	2.1 km	MPC · JPL
458184	2010 NO_{69}	—	July 14, 2010	WISE	WISE	·	1.3 km	MPC · JPL
458185	2010 NP_{69}	—	July 14, 2010	WISE	WISE	GEF	2.5 km	MPC · JPL
458186	2010 NU_{72}	—	October 3, 1997	Caussols	ODAS	·	1.8 km	MPC · JPL
458187	2010 NA_{77}	—	July 15, 2010	WISE	WISE	·	1.4 km	MPC · JPL
458188	2010 NK_{80}	—	July 15, 2010	WISE	WISE	·	1.7 km	MPC · JPL
458189	2010 OC_{25}	—	October 23, 2006	Kitt Peak	Spacewatch	·	1.6 km	MPC · JPL
458190	2010 OY_{92}	—	July 27, 2010	WISE	WISE	·	2.6 km	MPC · JPL
458191	2010 OM_{97}	—	July 28, 2010	WISE	WISE	·	2.4 km	MPC · JPL
458192	2010 PX_{10}	—	August 1, 2010	WISE	WISE	·	3.1 km	MPC · JPL
458193	2010 PM_{16}	—	August 3, 2010	WISE	WISE	·	2.8 km	MPC · JPL
458194	2010 QG_{3}	—	October 16, 2007	Kitt Peak	Spacewatch	·	640 m	MPC · JPL
458195	2010 QJ_{3}	—	October 31, 2006	Catalina	CSS	·	1.5 km	MPC · JPL
458196	2010 QW_{3}	—	June 13, 2010	Mount Lemmon	Mount Lemmon Survey	MAR	1.1 km	MPC · JPL
458197	2010 QK_{4}	—	August 18, 2010	XuYi	PMO NEO Survey Program	·	1.3 km	MPC · JPL
458198	2010 RT_{11}	—	September 2, 2010	Mount Lemmon	Mount Lemmon Survey	AMO	540 m	MPC · JPL
458199	2010 RL_{28}	—	September 4, 2010	Mount Lemmon	Mount Lemmon Survey	·	1.9 km	MPC · JPL
458200	2010 RZ_{39}	—	September 3, 2010	Socorro	LINEAR	·	1.5 km	MPC · JPL

== 458201–458300 ==
back to top

Designation			Discovery			Properties		Ref
Permanent	Provisional	Named after	Date	Site	Discoverer(s)	Category	Diam.	Ref
458201	2010 RY_{42}	—	September 18, 2003	Kitt Peak	Spacewatch	·	670 m	MPC · JPL
458202	2010 RA_{46}	—	July 21, 2006	Mount Lemmon	Mount Lemmon Survey	·	1.7 km	MPC · JPL
458203	2010 RS_{48}	—	October 19, 2006	Mount Lemmon	Mount Lemmon Survey	·	1.0 km	MPC · JPL
458204	2010 RG_{53}	—	September 7, 2010	La Sagra	OAM	·	1.6 km	MPC · JPL
458205	2010 RT_{61}	—	September 6, 2010	Kitt Peak	Spacewatch	KOR	1.3 km	MPC · JPL
458206	2010 RV_{61}	—	September 6, 2010	Kitt Peak	Spacewatch	MAR	1.1 km	MPC · JPL
458207	2010 RD_{64}	—	September 9, 2010	Kachina	Hobart, J.	·	1.6 km	MPC · JPL
458208	2010 RJ_{65}	—	October 19, 2006	Catalina	CSS	·	1.6 km	MPC · JPL
458209	2010 RA_{69}	—	September 6, 2010	Socorro	LINEAR	V	740 m	MPC · JPL
458210	2010 RX_{75}	—	September 10, 2010	Mount Lemmon	Mount Lemmon Survey	·	1.4 km	MPC · JPL
458211	2010 RF_{79}	—	September 7, 1999	Kitt Peak	Spacewatch	·	1.0 km	MPC · JPL
458212	2010 RG_{79}	—	September 2, 2010	Mount Lemmon	Mount Lemmon Survey	·	1.5 km	MPC · JPL
458213	2010 RP_{79}	—	September 3, 2010	La Sagra	OAM	JUN	1 km	MPC · JPL
458214	2010 RP_{101}	—	September 10, 2010	Kitt Peak	Spacewatch	·	2.0 km	MPC · JPL
458215	2010 RE_{104}	—	September 10, 2010	Kitt Peak	Spacewatch	·	1.3 km	MPC · JPL
458216	2010 RU_{112}	—	July 6, 2010	WISE	WISE	·	1.7 km	MPC · JPL
458217	2010 RZ_{114}	—	September 11, 2010	Kitt Peak	Spacewatch	·	1.1 km	MPC · JPL
458218	2010 RL_{116}	—	November 20, 2006	Kitt Peak	Spacewatch	·	1.3 km	MPC · JPL
458219	2010 RS_{128}	—	December 30, 2007	Kitt Peak	Spacewatch	·	1.2 km	MPC · JPL
458220	2010 RX_{135}	—	September 10, 2010	Kitt Peak	Spacewatch	·	1.1 km	MPC · JPL
458221	2010 RO_{136}	—	September 14, 2010	Kitt Peak	Spacewatch	·	1.6 km	MPC · JPL
458222	2010 RL_{142}	—	September 14, 2010	Kitt Peak	Spacewatch	·	1.9 km	MPC · JPL
458223	2010 RK_{145}	—	September 4, 2010	Kitt Peak	Spacewatch	·	1.5 km	MPC · JPL
458224	2010 RL_{148}	—	September 19, 2003	Kitt Peak	Spacewatch	·	840 m	MPC · JPL
458225	2010 RN_{165}	—	August 13, 2010	Kitt Peak	Spacewatch	·	980 m	MPC · JPL
458226	2010 RZ_{165}	—	September 10, 2010	Kitt Peak	Spacewatch	·	1.2 km	MPC · JPL
458227	2010 RT_{180}	—	September 10, 2010	Mount Lemmon	Mount Lemmon Survey	·	1.3 km	MPC · JPL
458228	2010 SA_{3}	—	September 16, 2010	Mount Lemmon	Mount Lemmon Survey	·	1.7 km	MPC · JPL
458229	2010 SD_{17}	—	August 28, 2005	Kitt Peak	Spacewatch	KOR	1.3 km	MPC · JPL
458230	2010 SE_{17}	—	September 16, 2010	Kitt Peak	Spacewatch	JUN	1.0 km	MPC · JPL
458231	2010 SJ_{25}	—	September 19, 2001	Kitt Peak	Spacewatch	·	1.0 km	MPC · JPL
458232	2010 TG_{6}	—	April 4, 2003	Kitt Peak	Spacewatch	·	2.4 km	MPC · JPL
458233	2010 TW_{7}	—	October 22, 2006	Kitt Peak	Spacewatch	·	1.5 km	MPC · JPL
458234	2010 TJ_{9}	—	October 1, 2010	Kitt Peak	Spacewatch	·	1.5 km	MPC · JPL
458235	2010 TD_{12}	—	September 18, 2010	Mount Lemmon	Mount Lemmon Survey	JUN	1.0 km	MPC · JPL
458236	2010 TV_{12}	—	October 3, 2010	Kitt Peak	Spacewatch	·	1.1 km	MPC · JPL
458237	2010 TZ_{13}	—	October 23, 2006	Mount Lemmon	Mount Lemmon Survey	·	1.4 km	MPC · JPL
458238	2010 TC_{14}	—	September 27, 2006	Mount Lemmon	Mount Lemmon Survey	·	1.2 km	MPC · JPL
458239	2010 TY_{29}	—	March 31, 2001	Kitt Peak	Spacewatch	·	1.4 km	MPC · JPL
458240	2010 TP_{37}	—	November 17, 2006	Kitt Peak	Spacewatch	·	1.5 km	MPC · JPL
458241	2010 TA_{40}	—	September 19, 2010	Kitt Peak	Spacewatch	·	1.4 km	MPC · JPL
458242	2010 TO_{41}	—	November 11, 2006	Mount Lemmon	Mount Lemmon Survey	·	980 m	MPC · JPL
458243	2010 TT_{41}	—	April 30, 2009	Catalina	CSS	PHO	840 m	MPC · JPL
458244	2010 TA_{49}	—	September 17, 2010	Mount Lemmon	Mount Lemmon Survey	·	2.0 km	MPC · JPL
458245	2010 TD_{51}	—	September 16, 2010	Kitt Peak	Spacewatch	·	1.0 km	MPC · JPL
458246	2010 TK_{56}	—	July 16, 2010	WISE	WISE	·	2.3 km	MPC · JPL
458247	2010 TE_{58}	—	September 1, 2010	Mount Lemmon	Mount Lemmon Survey	·	1.4 km	MPC · JPL
458248	2010 TJ_{63}	—	September 14, 2010	Kitt Peak	Spacewatch	AGN	970 m	MPC · JPL
458249	2010 TB_{74}	—	September 10, 2010	Kitt Peak	Spacewatch	·	970 m	MPC · JPL
458250	2010 TB_{96}	—	September 4, 2010	Kitt Peak	Spacewatch	NYS	940 m	MPC · JPL
458251	2010 TZ_{105}	—	October 9, 2010	Kitt Peak	Spacewatch	·	1.4 km	MPC · JPL
458252	2010 TJ_{108}	—	October 21, 2006	Kitt Peak	Spacewatch	·	800 m	MPC · JPL
458253	2010 TR_{115}	—	October 23, 2006	Kitt Peak	Spacewatch	·	900 m	MPC · JPL
458254	2010 TE_{129}	—	October 3, 2010	Catalina	CSS	·	1.5 km	MPC · JPL
458255	2010 TJ_{139}	—	October 11, 2010	Mount Lemmon	Mount Lemmon Survey	·	1.6 km	MPC · JPL
458256	2010 TE_{149}	—	November 13, 2006	Kitt Peak	Spacewatch	·	1.3 km	MPC · JPL
458257	2010 TN_{152}	—	October 1, 2010	Mount Lemmon	Mount Lemmon Survey	(5)	1.1 km	MPC · JPL
458258	2010 TR_{162}	—	May 15, 2005	Mount Lemmon	Mount Lemmon Survey	·	2.9 km	MPC · JPL
458259	2010 TK_{164}	—	October 12, 2010	Mount Lemmon	Mount Lemmon Survey	·	1.3 km	MPC · JPL
458260	2010 TB_{166}	—	July 13, 2010	Kitt Peak	Spacewatch	·	1.9 km	MPC · JPL
458261	2010 TD_{173}	—	November 17, 2006	Kitt Peak	Spacewatch	·	1.6 km	MPC · JPL
458262	2010 TF_{173}	—	November 1, 2006	Mount Lemmon	Mount Lemmon Survey	·	1.3 km	MPC · JPL
458263	2010 UU_{4}	—	October 13, 2010	Catalina	CSS	·	2.0 km	MPC · JPL
458264	2010 UR_{9}	—	November 10, 2006	Kitt Peak	Spacewatch	·	1.1 km	MPC · JPL
458265	2010 UV_{9}	—	October 17, 2010	Mount Lemmon	Mount Lemmon Survey	·	1.9 km	MPC · JPL
458266	2010 UR_{12}	—	September 16, 2010	Mount Lemmon	Mount Lemmon Survey	·	1.6 km	MPC · JPL
458267	2010 UG_{15}	—	July 16, 2010	WISE	WISE	·	1.7 km	MPC · JPL
458268	2010 UV_{15}	—	November 15, 2001	Kitt Peak	Spacewatch	·	2.4 km	MPC · JPL
458269	2010 UT_{20}	—	September 17, 2010	Mount Lemmon	Mount Lemmon Survey	·	1.3 km	MPC · JPL
458270	2010 UJ_{26}	—	October 28, 2010	Mount Lemmon	Mount Lemmon Survey	NEM	2.0 km	MPC · JPL
458271	2010 UM_{26}	—	November 10, 2006	Kitt Peak	Spacewatch	·	1.0 km	MPC · JPL
458272	2010 UR_{28}	—	October 28, 2010	Mount Lemmon	Mount Lemmon Survey	EOS	2.2 km	MPC · JPL
458273	2010 UU_{30}	—	October 13, 2010	Mount Lemmon	Mount Lemmon Survey	HOF	1.8 km	MPC · JPL
458274	2010 UM_{32}	—	July 29, 2010	WISE	WISE	·	1.6 km	MPC · JPL
458275	2010 UN_{36}	—	October 29, 2010	Mount Lemmon	Mount Lemmon Survey	·	1.6 km	MPC · JPL
458276	2010 UF_{45}	—	March 5, 2008	Mount Lemmon	Mount Lemmon Survey	·	1.1 km	MPC · JPL
458277	2010 UK_{46}	—	September 18, 2010	Mount Lemmon	Mount Lemmon Survey	·	1.3 km	MPC · JPL
458278	2010 UY_{51}	—	September 17, 2010	Mount Lemmon	Mount Lemmon Survey	·	1.8 km	MPC · JPL
458279	2010 UB_{55}	—	September 28, 2006	Mount Lemmon	Mount Lemmon Survey	·	1.1 km	MPC · JPL
458280	2010 UP_{55}	—	October 29, 2010	Kitt Peak	Spacewatch	·	1.5 km	MPC · JPL
458281	2010 UZ_{55}	—	September 5, 2010	Mount Lemmon	Mount Lemmon Survey	·	1.8 km	MPC · JPL
458282	2010 UJ_{60}	—	October 9, 2005	Kitt Peak	Spacewatch	MRX	1.1 km	MPC · JPL
458283	2010 UR_{61}	—	March 24, 2003	Socorro	LINEAR	·	1.9 km	MPC · JPL
458284	2010 UQ_{64}	—	March 13, 2008	Kitt Peak	Spacewatch	·	1.1 km	MPC · JPL
458285	2010 UZ_{66}	—	April 25, 2004	Kitt Peak	Spacewatch	·	2.2 km	MPC · JPL
458286	2010 UA_{71}	—	October 17, 2010	Catalina	CSS	·	1.7 km	MPC · JPL
458287	2010 UK_{72}	—	October 29, 2010	Kitt Peak	Spacewatch	·	1.9 km	MPC · JPL
458288	2010 UA_{73}	—	November 17, 2001	Kitt Peak	Spacewatch	·	1.9 km	MPC · JPL
458289	2010 UX_{78}	—	October 30, 2010	Mount Lemmon	Mount Lemmon Survey	·	1.5 km	MPC · JPL
458290	2010 UQ_{79}	—	October 30, 2010	Mount Lemmon	Mount Lemmon Survey	·	2.0 km	MPC · JPL
458291	2010 UL_{81}	—	October 31, 2010	Mount Lemmon	Mount Lemmon Survey	·	1.4 km	MPC · JPL
458292	2010 US_{81}	—	January 12, 2008	Kitt Peak	Spacewatch	·	990 m	MPC · JPL
458293	2010 UQ_{83}	—	October 29, 2010	Kitt Peak	Spacewatch	JUN	990 m	MPC · JPL
458294	2010 UB_{93}	—	September 15, 2010	Catalina	CSS	·	1.7 km	MPC · JPL
458295	2010 UC_{96}	—	August 12, 2010	Kitt Peak	Spacewatch	·	1.7 km	MPC · JPL
458296	2010 UM_{96}	—	August 21, 2006	Kitt Peak	Spacewatch	·	1.5 km	MPC · JPL
458297	2010 UV_{96}	—	October 19, 2010	Catalina	CSS	·	1.7 km	MPC · JPL
458298	2010 UN_{101}	—	October 14, 2010	Mount Lemmon	Mount Lemmon Survey	·	1.6 km	MPC · JPL
458299	2010 VV_{14}	—	November 1, 2010	Catalina	CSS	EUN	1.3 km	MPC · JPL
458300	2010 VZ_{15}	—	January 1, 2003	Kitt Peak	Spacewatch	·	1.2 km	MPC · JPL

== 458301–458400 ==
back to top

Designation			Discovery			Properties		Ref
Permanent	Provisional	Named after	Date	Site	Discoverer(s)	Category	Diam.	Ref
458301	2010 VN_{16}	—	October 12, 2010	Mount Lemmon	Mount Lemmon Survey	·	1.7 km	MPC · JPL
458302	2010 VK_{18}	—	November 2, 2010	Mount Lemmon	Mount Lemmon Survey	·	1.4 km	MPC · JPL
458303	2010 VB_{25}	—	October 25, 2005	Kitt Peak	Spacewatch	·	1.3 km	MPC · JPL
458304	2010 VT_{28}	—	October 12, 2010	Mount Lemmon	Mount Lemmon Survey	·	2.3 km	MPC · JPL
458305	2010 VP_{37}	—	December 10, 2006	Kitt Peak	Spacewatch	·	1.3 km	MPC · JPL
458306	2010 VE_{42}	—	October 17, 2010	Mount Lemmon	Mount Lemmon Survey	AGN	770 m	MPC · JPL
458307	2010 VO_{44}	—	November 14, 2006	Kitt Peak	Spacewatch	·	1.2 km	MPC · JPL
458308	2010 VD_{47}	—	November 2, 2010	Kitt Peak	Spacewatch	·	1.7 km	MPC · JPL
458309	2010 VC_{50}	—	September 11, 2010	Mount Lemmon	Mount Lemmon Survey	·	1.4 km	MPC · JPL
458310	2010 VE_{57}	—	September 13, 2005	Kitt Peak	Spacewatch	·	1.2 km	MPC · JPL
458311	2010 VM_{60}	—	July 31, 2010	WISE	WISE	·	1.4 km	MPC · JPL
458312	2010 VA_{70}	—	October 29, 2010	Mount Lemmon	Mount Lemmon Survey	·	1.2 km	MPC · JPL
458313	2010 VZ_{70}	—	December 17, 2001	Socorro	LINEAR	·	1.6 km	MPC · JPL
458314	2010 VQ_{84}	—	November 5, 2010	Kitt Peak	Spacewatch	·	1.6 km	MPC · JPL
458315	2010 VV_{84}	—	November 5, 2010	Kitt Peak	Spacewatch	·	1.1 km	MPC · JPL
458316	2010 VC_{85}	—	November 18, 2006	Kitt Peak	Spacewatch	EUN	1.1 km	MPC · JPL
458317	2010 VY_{88}	—	October 29, 2010	Kitt Peak	Spacewatch	·	2.2 km	MPC · JPL
458318	2010 VE_{89}	—	October 29, 2010	Kitt Peak	Spacewatch	·	2.1 km	MPC · JPL
458319	2010 VB_{95}	—	August 9, 2010	WISE	WISE	DOR	2.9 km	MPC · JPL
458320	2010 VG_{96}	—	November 8, 2010	Kitt Peak	Spacewatch	·	3.1 km	MPC · JPL
458321	2010 VR_{104}	—	December 24, 2006	Kitt Peak	Spacewatch	·	1.2 km	MPC · JPL
458322	2010 VT_{104}	—	November 5, 2010	Kitt Peak	Spacewatch	·	1.6 km	MPC · JPL
458323	2010 VZ_{105}	—	November 5, 2010	Mount Lemmon	Mount Lemmon Survey	·	1.3 km	MPC · JPL
458324	2010 VD_{107}	—	April 5, 2008	Mount Lemmon	Mount Lemmon Survey	·	1.8 km	MPC · JPL
458325	2010 VS_{111}	—	November 6, 2010	Mount Lemmon	Mount Lemmon Survey	·	1.8 km	MPC · JPL
458326	2010 VZ_{114}	—	October 29, 2010	Mount Lemmon	Mount Lemmon Survey	·	1.6 km	MPC · JPL
458327	2010 VS_{118}	—	November 8, 2010	Kitt Peak	Spacewatch	GEF	1.1 km	MPC · JPL
458328	2010 VN_{121}	—	December 2, 1996	Kitt Peak	Spacewatch	GEF	1.1 km	MPC · JPL
458329	2010 VO_{122}	—	January 10, 2008	Mount Lemmon	Mount Lemmon Survey	·	1.2 km	MPC · JPL
458330	2010 VK_{132}	—	October 30, 2010	Catalina	CSS	EUN	1.4 km	MPC · JPL
458331	2010 VU_{132}	—	September 19, 2001	Kitt Peak	Spacewatch	LEO	1.4 km	MPC · JPL
458332	2010 VB_{133}	—	April 12, 2008	Kitt Peak	Spacewatch	·	2.0 km	MPC · JPL
458333	2010 VX_{133}	—	November 2, 2010	Mount Lemmon	Mount Lemmon Survey	·	1.3 km	MPC · JPL
458334	2010 VV_{134}	—	November 1, 2010	Kitt Peak	Spacewatch	EUN	1.1 km	MPC · JPL
458335	2010 VY_{135}	—	September 10, 2010	Kitt Peak	Spacewatch	·	1.7 km	MPC · JPL
458336	2010 VM_{136}	—	April 25, 2000	Kitt Peak	Spacewatch	·	1.5 km	MPC · JPL
458337	2010 VU_{139}	—	February 4, 2006	Catalina	CSS	H	640 m	MPC · JPL
458338	2010 VL_{152}	—	November 6, 2010	Mount Lemmon	Mount Lemmon Survey	(18466)	1.9 km	MPC · JPL
458339	2010 VR_{152}	—	November 6, 2010	Mount Lemmon	Mount Lemmon Survey	·	1.9 km	MPC · JPL
458340	2010 VE_{162}	—	August 27, 2005	Kitt Peak	Spacewatch	·	1.5 km	MPC · JPL
458341	2010 VJ_{163}	—	November 2, 2010	Kitt Peak	Spacewatch	·	1.7 km	MPC · JPL
458342	2010 VO_{165}	—	October 14, 2010	Mount Lemmon	Mount Lemmon Survey	·	1.4 km	MPC · JPL
458343	2010 VP_{168}	—	November 19, 2006	Kitt Peak	Spacewatch	·	1.2 km	MPC · JPL
458344	2010 VB_{169}	—	October 6, 2005	Mount Lemmon	Mount Lemmon Survey	·	1.8 km	MPC · JPL
458345	2010 VA_{172}	—	May 7, 2007	Kitt Peak	Spacewatch	·	3.1 km	MPC · JPL
458346	2010 VP_{173}	—	November 10, 2010	Mount Lemmon	Mount Lemmon Survey	·	1.4 km	MPC · JPL
458347	2010 VT_{174}	—	September 11, 2010	Mount Lemmon	Mount Lemmon Survey	GEF	1.2 km	MPC · JPL
458348	2010 VE_{176}	—	October 31, 2010	Mount Lemmon	Mount Lemmon Survey	·	1.3 km	MPC · JPL
458349	2010 VZ_{177}	—	November 2, 2010	Kitt Peak	Spacewatch	·	1.5 km	MPC · JPL
458350	2010 VG_{179}	—	November 1, 2010	Kitt Peak	Spacewatch	·	1.7 km	MPC · JPL
458351	2010 VK_{184}	—	December 21, 2006	Kitt Peak	Spacewatch	·	1.3 km	MPC · JPL
458352	2010 VM_{184}	—	October 13, 2010	Mount Lemmon	Mount Lemmon Survey	·	1.7 km	MPC · JPL
458353	2010 VU_{184}	—	November 9, 2001	Socorro	LINEAR	·	1.2 km	MPC · JPL
458354	2010 VU_{189}	—	March 11, 2008	Mount Lemmon	Mount Lemmon Survey	·	1.5 km	MPC · JPL
458355	2010 VH_{193}	—	August 28, 2005	Kitt Peak	Spacewatch	·	1.4 km	MPC · JPL
458356	2010 VD_{196}	—	September 3, 2010	Mount Lemmon	Mount Lemmon Survey	·	1.7 km	MPC · JPL
458357	2010 VB_{199}	—	November 1, 2010	Kitt Peak	Spacewatch	·	1.2 km	MPC · JPL
458358	2010 VM_{199}	—	September 18, 2010	Mount Lemmon	Mount Lemmon Survey	·	2.0 km	MPC · JPL
458359	2010 VG_{200}	—	November 21, 2006	Mount Lemmon	Mount Lemmon Survey	JUN	970 m	MPC · JPL
458360	2010 VV_{206}	—	November 18, 2006	Kitt Peak	Spacewatch	·	1.4 km	MPC · JPL
458361	2010 VX_{209}	—	October 11, 2010	Mount Lemmon	Mount Lemmon Survey	·	1.2 km	MPC · JPL
458362	2010 VV_{210}	—	March 17, 2012	Mount Lemmon	Mount Lemmon Survey	·	1.3 km	MPC · JPL
458363	2010 VK_{214}	—	April 7, 2008	Mount Lemmon	Mount Lemmon Survey	·	1.4 km	MPC · JPL
458364	2010 VN_{218}	—	December 13, 2006	Kitt Peak	Spacewatch	·	1.4 km	MPC · JPL
458365	2010 VU_{218}	—	December 14, 2006	Kitt Peak	Spacewatch	·	1.1 km	MPC · JPL
458366	2010 VV_{218}	—	October 29, 2010	Catalina	CSS	·	1.6 km	MPC · JPL
458367	2010 VB_{220}	—	November 23, 2006	Kitt Peak	Spacewatch	·	1.4 km	MPC · JPL
458368	2010 WJ	—	November 17, 2010	Socorro	LINEAR	AMO	710 m	MPC · JPL
458369	2010 WQ_{2}	—	March 28, 2008	Kitt Peak	Spacewatch	·	1.8 km	MPC · JPL
458370	2010 WL_{3}	—	September 5, 2010	Mount Lemmon	Mount Lemmon Survey	MIS	2.6 km	MPC · JPL
458371	2010 WO_{3}	—	November 14, 2010	Kitt Peak	Spacewatch	·	1.3 km	MPC · JPL
458372	2010 WX_{4}	—	December 21, 2006	Kitt Peak	Spacewatch	·	1.3 km	MPC · JPL
458373	2010 WA_{7}	—	November 13, 2010	Kitt Peak	Spacewatch	·	1.9 km	MPC · JPL
458374	2010 WW_{7}	—	January 9, 2002	Socorro	LINEAR	·	2.4 km	MPC · JPL
458375	2010 WY_{8}	—	April 27, 2003	Apache Point	SDSS	AMO	190 m	MPC · JPL
458376	2010 WF_{25}	—	November 27, 2010	Mount Lemmon	Mount Lemmon Survey	·	1.6 km	MPC · JPL
458377	2010 WF_{29}	—	November 6, 2010	Catalina	CSS	·	1.7 km	MPC · JPL
458378	2010 WW_{29}	—	November 27, 2010	Mount Lemmon	Mount Lemmon Survey	(5)	1.2 km	MPC · JPL
458379	2010 WW_{31}	—	November 11, 2010	Mount Lemmon	Mount Lemmon Survey	·	1.8 km	MPC · JPL
458380	2010 WY_{33}	—	November 27, 2010	Mount Lemmon	Mount Lemmon Survey	·	1.8 km	MPC · JPL
458381	2010 WP_{65}	—	April 20, 2007	Kitt Peak	Spacewatch	·	3.0 km	MPC · JPL
458382	2010 WG_{66}	—	November 19, 2006	Kitt Peak	Spacewatch	·	1.2 km	MPC · JPL
458383	2010 WL_{67}	—	November 10, 2010	Kitt Peak	Spacewatch	·	1.8 km	MPC · JPL
458384	2010 WX_{67}	—	November 3, 2010	Kitt Peak	Spacewatch	·	1.6 km	MPC · JPL
458385	2010 WU_{68}	—	September 29, 2005	Kitt Peak	Spacewatch	·	1.5 km	MPC · JPL
458386	2010 WZ_{69}	—	November 30, 2010	Mount Lemmon	Mount Lemmon Survey	EUN	1.0 km	MPC · JPL
458387	2010 XE_{3}	—	November 6, 1996	Kitt Peak	Spacewatch	·	1.6 km	MPC · JPL
458388	2010 XV_{8}	—	September 26, 2005	Kitt Peak	Spacewatch	·	1.4 km	MPC · JPL
458389	2010 XA_{9}	—	December 30, 2005	Kitt Peak	Spacewatch	EOS	1.5 km	MPC · JPL
458390	2010 XT_{9}	—	April 15, 2008	Mount Lemmon	Mount Lemmon Survey	·	2.0 km	MPC · JPL
458391	2010 XU_{9}	—	October 9, 2005	Kitt Peak	Spacewatch	·	2.0 km	MPC · JPL
458392	2010 XU_{11}	—	December 1, 2010	Kitt Peak	Spacewatch	·	2.3 km	MPC · JPL
458393	2010 XA_{12}	—	November 12, 2005	Kitt Peak	Spacewatch	·	1.5 km	MPC · JPL
458394	2010 XG_{12}	—	December 1, 2010	Kitt Peak	Spacewatch	·	2.4 km	MPC · JPL
458395	2010 XJ_{12}	—	June 18, 2005	Mount Lemmon	Mount Lemmon Survey	·	1.6 km	MPC · JPL
458396	2010 XY_{14}	—	December 4, 2010	Mount Lemmon	Mount Lemmon Survey	·	1.9 km	MPC · JPL
458397	2010 XS_{38}	—	November 3, 2010	Mount Lemmon	Mount Lemmon Survey	·	4.7 km	MPC · JPL
458398	2010 XO_{46}	—	December 14, 2001	Socorro	LINEAR	·	1.7 km	MPC · JPL
458399	2010 XA_{57}	—	February 10, 2008	Kitt Peak	Spacewatch	(2076)	640 m	MPC · JPL
458400	2010 XP_{58}	—	November 15, 2010	Catalina	CSS	·	1.4 km	MPC · JPL

== 458401–458500 ==
back to top

Designation			Discovery			Properties		Ref
Permanent	Provisional	Named after	Date	Site	Discoverer(s)	Category	Diam.	Ref
458401	2010 XR_{59}	—	January 7, 2006	Catalina	CSS	H	690 m	MPC · JPL
458402	2010 XB_{62}	—	May 27, 2008	Mount Lemmon	Mount Lemmon Survey	·	2.0 km	MPC · JPL
458403	2010 XV_{64}	—	December 6, 2010	Mount Lemmon	Mount Lemmon Survey	·	2.0 km	MPC · JPL
458404	2010 XV_{65}	—	January 2, 2006	Mount Lemmon	Mount Lemmon Survey	·	2.4 km	MPC · JPL
458405	2010 XC_{66}	—	December 10, 2010	Mount Lemmon	Mount Lemmon Survey	H	360 m	MPC · JPL
458406	2010 XH_{69}	—	April 30, 2008	Mount Lemmon	Mount Lemmon Survey	·	1.4 km	MPC · JPL
458407	2010 XU_{69}	—	December 12, 2006	Socorro	LINEAR	·	2.2 km	MPC · JPL
458408	2010 YM_{1}	—	November 28, 2010	Kitt Peak	Spacewatch	EUN	1.2 km	MPC · JPL
458409	2011 AP	—	February 10, 2002	Socorro	LINEAR	·	1.7 km	MPC · JPL
458410	2011 AK_{2}	—	January 23, 2006	Kitt Peak	Spacewatch	·	1.2 km	MPC · JPL
458411	2011 AM_{2}	—	January 23, 2006	Kitt Peak	Spacewatch	·	1.6 km	MPC · JPL
458412	2011 AD_{5}	—	January 27, 2007	Mount Lemmon	Mount Lemmon Survey	·	2.3 km	MPC · JPL
458413	2011 AH_{8}	—	September 19, 2009	Mount Lemmon	Mount Lemmon Survey	THM	1.9 km	MPC · JPL
458414	2011 AP_{9}	—	December 25, 2005	Kitt Peak	Spacewatch	·	2.2 km	MPC · JPL
458415	2011 AP_{10}	—	November 16, 2010	Mount Lemmon	Mount Lemmon Survey	EOS	1.9 km	MPC · JPL
458416	2011 AS_{10}	—	December 6, 2010	Mount Lemmon	Mount Lemmon Survey	·	2.6 km	MPC · JPL
458417	2011 AT_{10}	—	December 10, 2010	Mount Lemmon	Mount Lemmon Survey	·	3.1 km	MPC · JPL
458418	2011 AM_{12}	—	January 8, 2011	Siding Spring	SSS	APO · PHA · critical	450 m	MPC · JPL
458419	2011 AW_{12}	—	December 6, 2010	Mount Lemmon	Mount Lemmon Survey	EOS	2.0 km	MPC · JPL
458420	2011 AG_{14}	—	November 15, 2010	Mount Lemmon	Mount Lemmon Survey	·	2.4 km	MPC · JPL
458421	2011 AU_{21}	—	January 9, 2011	Mount Lemmon	Mount Lemmon Survey	·	2.2 km	MPC · JPL
458422	2011 AH_{26}	—	January 8, 2011	Mount Lemmon	Mount Lemmon Survey	·	2.4 km	MPC · JPL
458423	2011 AJ_{26}	—	December 25, 2010	Mount Lemmon	Mount Lemmon Survey	·	2.6 km	MPC · JPL
458424	2011 AX_{30}	—	January 16, 2000	Kitt Peak	Spacewatch	·	2.8 km	MPC · JPL
458425	2011 AV_{31}	—	August 27, 2009	Kitt Peak	Spacewatch	MRX	840 m	MPC · JPL
458426	2011 AV_{33}	—	October 18, 2009	Kitt Peak	Spacewatch	·	4.0 km	MPC · JPL
458427	2011 AS_{36}	—	January 12, 2011	Kitt Peak	Spacewatch	EOS	1.8 km	MPC · JPL
458428	2011 AP_{37}	—	December 13, 2010	Catalina	CSS	H	660 m	MPC · JPL
458429	2011 AA_{40}	—	December 4, 2005	Kitt Peak	Spacewatch	·	1.6 km	MPC · JPL
458430	2011 AQ_{42}	—	January 10, 2011	Mount Lemmon	Mount Lemmon Survey	·	1.6 km	MPC · JPL
458431	2011 AF_{43}	—	March 11, 2007	Kitt Peak	Spacewatch	·	1.7 km	MPC · JPL
458432	2011 AG_{43}	—	September 12, 2004	Socorro	LINEAR	H	600 m	MPC · JPL
458433	2011 AW_{43}	—	December 31, 2000	Kitt Peak	Spacewatch	·	1.5 km	MPC · JPL
458434	2011 AJ_{46}	—	December 10, 2010	Mount Lemmon	Mount Lemmon Survey	·	2.8 km	MPC · JPL
458435	2011 AW_{47}	—	January 11, 2011	Mount Lemmon	Mount Lemmon Survey	·	2.4 km	MPC · JPL
458436	2011 AL_{52}	—	January 14, 2011	Mount Lemmon	Mount Lemmon Survey	T_{j} (2.96) · AMO +1km · PHA	1.1 km	MPC · JPL
458437	2011 AS_{52}	—	January 6, 2000	Kitt Peak	Spacewatch	·	1.9 km	MPC · JPL
458438	2011 AK_{56}	—	December 8, 2010	Mount Lemmon	Mount Lemmon Survey	·	2.7 km	MPC · JPL
458439	2011 AW_{56}	—	January 10, 2011	Kitt Peak	Spacewatch	·	2.3 km	MPC · JPL
458440	2011 AZ_{57}	—	January 11, 2011	Mount Lemmon	Mount Lemmon Survey	EOS	1.8 km	MPC · JPL
458441	2011 AY_{65}	—	January 23, 2006	Kitt Peak	Spacewatch	·	1.8 km	MPC · JPL
458442	2011 AX_{73}	—	December 6, 2010	Mount Lemmon	Mount Lemmon Survey	·	2.2 km	MPC · JPL
458443	2011 AD_{76}	—	January 23, 2006	Kitt Peak	Spacewatch	·	1.3 km	MPC · JPL
458444	2011 AA_{78}	—	January 14, 2011	Mount Lemmon	Mount Lemmon Survey	·	1.9 km	MPC · JPL
458445	2011 AM_{78}	—	December 5, 2010	Mount Lemmon	Mount Lemmon Survey	·	3.0 km	MPC · JPL
458446	2011 BY_{1}	—	January 30, 2006	Kitt Peak	Spacewatch	EOS	1.9 km	MPC · JPL
458447	2011 BW_{3}	—	December 5, 2010	Mount Lemmon	Mount Lemmon Survey	·	2.4 km	MPC · JPL
458448	2011 BV_{4}	—	December 5, 2010	Mount Lemmon	Mount Lemmon Survey	·	2.1 km	MPC · JPL
458449	2011 BB_{5}	—	December 13, 2010	Mount Lemmon	Mount Lemmon Survey	·	3.7 km	MPC · JPL
458450	2011 BZ_{7}	—	December 25, 2005	Kitt Peak	Spacewatch	·	1.7 km	MPC · JPL
458451	2011 BG_{9}	—	January 22, 2006	Mount Lemmon	Mount Lemmon Survey	TEL	1.5 km	MPC · JPL
458452	2011 BR_{15}	—	January 25, 2011	Siding Spring	SSS	ATE	390 m	MPC · JPL
458453	2011 BF_{16}	—	December 25, 2005	Mount Lemmon	Mount Lemmon Survey	H	490 m	MPC · JPL
458454	2011 BK_{22}	—	September 6, 2008	Mount Lemmon	Mount Lemmon Survey	·	3.0 km	MPC · JPL
458455	2011 BK_{25}	—	November 16, 2009	Mount Lemmon	Mount Lemmon Survey	·	2.0 km	MPC · JPL
458456	2011 BD_{27}	—	September 22, 2009	Kitt Peak	Spacewatch	AST	1.6 km	MPC · JPL
458457	2011 BM_{28}	—	March 4, 2006	Mount Lemmon	Mount Lemmon Survey	THM	1.9 km	MPC · JPL
458458	2011 BV_{29}	—	April 20, 2007	Mount Lemmon	Mount Lemmon Survey	·	2.4 km	MPC · JPL
458459	2011 BS_{30}	—	September 20, 2003	Kitt Peak	Spacewatch	·	3.2 km	MPC · JPL
458460	2011 BJ_{34}	—	February 25, 2006	Mount Lemmon	Mount Lemmon Survey	·	2.3 km	MPC · JPL
458461	2011 BU_{36}	—	January 13, 2011	Kitt Peak	Spacewatch	·	3.0 km	MPC · JPL
458462	2011 BT_{37}	—	January 28, 2011	Mount Lemmon	Mount Lemmon Survey	·	2.5 km	MPC · JPL
458463	2011 BZ_{38}	—	February 11, 2010	WISE	WISE	·	2.3 km	MPC · JPL
458464	2011 BG_{44}	—	April 25, 2003	Kitt Peak	Spacewatch	·	1.9 km	MPC · JPL
458465	2011 BC_{51}	—	December 12, 2004	Kitt Peak	Spacewatch	·	3.2 km	MPC · JPL
458466	2011 BY_{55}	—	January 13, 2011	Mount Lemmon	Mount Lemmon Survey	·	2.2 km	MPC · JPL
458467	2011 BG_{61}	—	January 4, 2011	Mount Lemmon	Mount Lemmon Survey	HOF	2.4 km	MPC · JPL
458468	2011 BF_{63}	—	December 8, 2010	Mount Lemmon	Mount Lemmon Survey	EMA	3.3 km	MPC · JPL
458469	2011 BU_{66}	—	January 29, 2011	Kitt Peak	Spacewatch	·	2.3 km	MPC · JPL
458470	2011 BV_{66}	—	August 12, 2007	Kitt Peak	Spacewatch	·	2.8 km	MPC · JPL
458471	2011 BB_{68}	—	January 28, 2011	Mount Lemmon	Mount Lemmon Survey	·	2.2 km	MPC · JPL
458472	2011 BV_{86}	—	February 24, 2006	Kitt Peak	Spacewatch	·	1.9 km	MPC · JPL
458473	2011 BF_{87}	—	January 12, 2011	Mount Lemmon	Mount Lemmon Survey	·	1.8 km	MPC · JPL
458474	2011 BW_{87}	—	December 8, 2010	Mount Lemmon	Mount Lemmon Survey	EOS	1.7 km	MPC · JPL
458475	2011 BM_{89}	—	September 20, 2003	Kitt Peak	Spacewatch	EOS	3.3 km	MPC · JPL
458476	2011 BS_{102}	—	February 3, 2010	WISE	WISE	·	3.2 km	MPC · JPL
458477	2011 BZ_{103}	—	January 14, 2011	Kitt Peak	Spacewatch	·	1.9 km	MPC · JPL
458478	2011 BX_{104}	—	January 31, 2006	Kitt Peak	Spacewatch	·	1.9 km	MPC · JPL
458479	2011 BF_{107}	—	October 16, 2009	Catalina	CSS	·	3.4 km	MPC · JPL
458480	2011 BE_{108}	—	February 27, 2006	Kitt Peak	Spacewatch	·	2.2 km	MPC · JPL
458481	2011 BX_{109}	—	January 27, 2010	WISE	WISE	·	1.8 km	MPC · JPL
458482	2011 BH_{113}	—	January 28, 2006	Mount Lemmon	Mount Lemmon Survey	·	1.9 km	MPC · JPL
458483	2011 BK_{114}	—	December 5, 2010	Mount Lemmon	Mount Lemmon Survey	EUN	1.5 km	MPC · JPL
458484	2011 BG_{115}	—	January 8, 2006	Mount Lemmon	Mount Lemmon Survey	·	1.5 km	MPC · JPL
458485	2011 BD_{119}	—	January 23, 2006	Kitt Peak	Spacewatch	·	2.8 km	MPC · JPL
458486	2011 BQ_{121}	—	November 11, 2009	Mount Lemmon	Mount Lemmon Survey	·	3.6 km	MPC · JPL
458487	2011 BX_{145}	—	January 29, 2011	Mount Lemmon	Mount Lemmon Survey	·	2.0 km	MPC · JPL
458488	2011 BX_{153}	—	December 5, 2005	Mount Lemmon	Mount Lemmon Survey	·	1.9 km	MPC · JPL
458489	2011 BR_{154}	—	September 16, 2009	Kitt Peak	Spacewatch	·	1.7 km	MPC · JPL
458490	2011 BS_{161}	—	December 5, 2010	Mount Lemmon	Mount Lemmon Survey	BRA	1.3 km	MPC · JPL
458491	2011 BA_{162}	—	January 10, 2011	Kitt Peak	Spacewatch	·	2.4 km	MPC · JPL
458492	2011 CS	—	April 25, 2007	Kitt Peak	Spacewatch	·	2.1 km	MPC · JPL
458493	2011 CE_{3}	—	January 11, 2011	Mount Lemmon	Mount Lemmon Survey	H	560 m	MPC · JPL
458494	2011 CF_{4}	—	January 23, 2006	Kitt Peak	Spacewatch	·	1.5 km	MPC · JPL
458495	2011 CL_{6}	—	March 14, 2002	Anderson Mesa	LONEOS	·	2.5 km	MPC · JPL
458496	2011 CT_{8}	—	January 14, 2011	Kitt Peak	Spacewatch	·	3.4 km	MPC · JPL
458497	2011 CR_{11}	—	October 22, 2009	Mount Lemmon	Mount Lemmon Survey	KOR	1.1 km	MPC · JPL
458498	2011 CP_{23}	—	January 7, 2006	Mount Lemmon	Mount Lemmon Survey	H	400 m	MPC · JPL
458499	2011 CG_{24}	—	December 9, 2004	Catalina	CSS	T_{j} (2.92)	4.6 km	MPC · JPL
458500	2011 CE_{25}	—	January 14, 2010	WISE	WISE	·	1.8 km	MPC · JPL

== 458501–458600 ==
back to top

Designation			Discovery			Properties		Ref
Permanent	Provisional	Named after	Date	Site	Discoverer(s)	Category	Diam.	Ref
458501	2011 CL_{25}	—	February 3, 2010	WISE	WISE	·	3.8 km	MPC · JPL
458502	2011 CQ_{27}	—	January 24, 2006	Anderson Mesa	LONEOS	·	2.4 km	MPC · JPL
458503	2011 CE_{30}	—	December 3, 2010	Mount Lemmon	Mount Lemmon Survey	·	2.8 km	MPC · JPL
458504	2011 CC_{34}	—	January 22, 2006	Mount Lemmon	Mount Lemmon Survey	·	2.0 km	MPC · JPL
458505	2011 CW_{36}	—	February 10, 2002	Socorro	LINEAR	·	2.7 km	MPC · JPL
458506	2011 CM_{39}	—	March 24, 2006	Kitt Peak	Spacewatch	·	1.8 km	MPC · JPL
458507	2011 CH_{40}	—	January 15, 2011	Mount Lemmon	Mount Lemmon Survey	·	2.4 km	MPC · JPL
458508	2011 CM_{42}	—	September 11, 2007	Mount Lemmon	Mount Lemmon Survey	T_{j} (2.99)	4.5 km	MPC · JPL
458509	2011 CT_{44}	—	September 5, 2008	Kitt Peak	Spacewatch	·	1.9 km	MPC · JPL
458510	2011 CC_{46}	—	November 13, 2010	Mount Lemmon	Mount Lemmon Survey	·	2.1 km	MPC · JPL
458511	2011 CG_{46}	—	February 9, 2010	WISE	WISE	·	4.1 km	MPC · JPL
458512	2011 CQ_{47}	—	April 29, 2000	Anderson Mesa	LONEOS	·	5.3 km	MPC · JPL
458513	2011 CF_{58}	—	September 7, 2008	Catalina	CSS	DOR	2.5 km	MPC · JPL
458514	2011 CG_{59}	—	October 24, 2009	Kitt Peak	Spacewatch	KOR	1.2 km	MPC · JPL
458515	2011 CA_{63}	—	November 16, 2010	Mount Lemmon	Mount Lemmon Survey	·	2.1 km	MPC · JPL
458516	2011 CQ_{64}	—	October 25, 2009	Mount Lemmon	Mount Lemmon Survey	EOS	2.1 km	MPC · JPL
458517	2011 CA_{68}	—	January 14, 2011	Kitt Peak	Spacewatch	EUN	1.3 km	MPC · JPL
458518	2011 CO_{68}	—	February 25, 2006	Kitt Peak	Spacewatch	·	2.2 km	MPC · JPL
458519	2011 CS_{71}	—	February 2, 2006	Mount Lemmon	Mount Lemmon Survey	·	2.3 km	MPC · JPL
458520	2011 CT_{71}	—	September 9, 2008	Mount Lemmon	Mount Lemmon Survey	·	3.0 km	MPC · JPL
458521	2011 CZ_{72}	—	January 26, 2006	Mount Lemmon	Mount Lemmon Survey	·	3.0 km	MPC · JPL
458522	2011 CW_{76}	—	October 15, 2004	Kitt Peak	Spacewatch	·	1.8 km	MPC · JPL
458523	2011 CV_{83}	—	December 10, 2010	Mount Lemmon	Mount Lemmon Survey	EOS	2.1 km	MPC · JPL
458524	2011 CA_{99}	—	October 5, 2004	Kitt Peak	Spacewatch	·	1.5 km	MPC · JPL
458525	2011 CE_{104}	—	September 6, 2008	Mount Lemmon	Mount Lemmon Survey	·	1.4 km	MPC · JPL
458526	2011 CR_{106}	—	March 16, 2007	Kitt Peak	Spacewatch	·	1.7 km	MPC · JPL
458527	2011 CM_{107}	—	September 5, 2008	Kitt Peak	Spacewatch	·	2.9 km	MPC · JPL
458528	2011 CQ_{107}	—	September 7, 1996	Kitt Peak	Spacewatch	·	2.6 km	MPC · JPL
458529	2011 DZ	—	September 6, 2008	Kitt Peak	Spacewatch	·	3.0 km	MPC · JPL
458530	2011 DG_{1}	—	February 1, 2006	Mount Lemmon	Mount Lemmon Survey	·	1.5 km	MPC · JPL
458531	2011 DQ_{5}	—	January 29, 2011	Kitt Peak	Spacewatch	H	650 m	MPC · JPL
458532	2011 DS_{12}	—	February 23, 2011	Kitt Peak	Spacewatch	·	2.8 km	MPC · JPL
458533	2011 DN_{18}	—	February 14, 2005	Kitt Peak	Spacewatch	THM	1.8 km	MPC · JPL
458534	2011 DP_{19}	—	March 12, 2007	Kitt Peak	Spacewatch	·	2.0 km	MPC · JPL
458535	2011 DB_{20}	—	September 2, 2008	Kitt Peak	Spacewatch	·	2.6 km	MPC · JPL
458536	2011 DB_{27}	—	March 3, 2006	Kitt Peak	Spacewatch	·	1.9 km	MPC · JPL
458537	2011 DK_{40}	—	April 27, 2006	Catalina	CSS	·	2.6 km	MPC · JPL
458538	2011 DQ_{49}	—	September 7, 2008	Mount Lemmon	Mount Lemmon Survey	·	3.4 km	MPC · JPL
458539	2011 DH_{50}	—	November 25, 2005	Catalina	CSS	·	2.3 km	MPC · JPL
458540	2011 DK_{50}	—	February 25, 2011	Catalina	CSS	·	3.8 km	MPC · JPL
458541	2011 DV_{51}	—	October 1, 2003	Kitt Peak	Spacewatch	·	2.9 km	MPC · JPL
458542	2011 DY_{51}	—	February 10, 2011	Mount Lemmon	Mount Lemmon Survey	H	550 m	MPC · JPL
458543	2011 EA	—	January 10, 2011	Mount Lemmon	Mount Lemmon Survey	H	520 m	MPC · JPL
458544	2011 EA_{7}	—	April 25, 2006	Kitt Peak	Spacewatch	·	2.8 km	MPC · JPL
458545	2011 EU_{10}	—	October 1, 2003	Kitt Peak	Spacewatch	BRA	1.3 km	MPC · JPL
458546	2011 EU_{13}	—	March 15, 2010	WISE	WISE	·	3.9 km	MPC · JPL
458547	2011 EP_{14}	—	February 22, 2011	Kitt Peak	Spacewatch	THM	2.4 km	MPC · JPL
458548	2011 ED_{17}	—	February 1, 2006	Catalina	CSS	H	570 m	MPC · JPL
458549	2011 EV_{17}	—	March 23, 2006	Catalina	CSS	·	3.7 km	MPC · JPL
458550	2011 EK_{19}	—	January 14, 2011	Mount Lemmon	Mount Lemmon Survey	·	3.9 km	MPC · JPL
458551	2011 EE_{22}	—	April 2, 2006	Kitt Peak	Spacewatch	·	2.5 km	MPC · JPL
458552	2011 EB_{27}	—	September 28, 2008	Mount Lemmon	Mount Lemmon Survey	·	3.1 km	MPC · JPL
458553	2011 EA_{28}	—	March 29, 1995	Kitt Peak	Spacewatch	·	1.6 km	MPC · JPL
458554	2011 EM_{33}	—	March 4, 2011	Mount Lemmon	Mount Lemmon Survey	H	470 m	MPC · JPL
458555	2011 EC_{35}	—	May 7, 2006	Mount Lemmon	Mount Lemmon Survey	·	2.0 km	MPC · JPL
458556	2011 EE_{39}	—	April 26, 2006	Mount Lemmon	Mount Lemmon Survey	THM	2.4 km	MPC · JPL
458557	2011 EC_{43}	—	February 9, 2010	WISE	WISE	·	2.9 km	MPC · JPL
458558	2011 EW_{45}	—	March 4, 2011	Catalina	CSS	H	630 m	MPC · JPL
458559	2011 EH_{48}	—	January 30, 2011	Kitt Peak	Spacewatch	·	2.4 km	MPC · JPL
458560	2011 ER_{51}	—	January 30, 2011	Kitt Peak	Spacewatch	·	2.9 km	MPC · JPL
458561	2011 ED_{54}	—	October 23, 2008	Kitt Peak	Spacewatch	·	3.5 km	MPC · JPL
458562	2011 EK_{54}	—	March 4, 2005	Mount Lemmon	Mount Lemmon Survey	·	2.8 km	MPC · JPL
458563	2011 EL_{54}	—	September 25, 2008	Mount Lemmon	Mount Lemmon Survey	EOS	1.8 km	MPC · JPL
458564	2011 EN_{60}	—	March 12, 2011	Mount Lemmon	Mount Lemmon Survey	EOS	1.6 km	MPC · JPL
458565	2011 ET_{60}	—	October 8, 2008	Catalina	CSS	EOS	2.4 km	MPC · JPL
458566	2011 EY_{60}	—	May 23, 2006	Kitt Peak	Spacewatch	·	3.2 km	MPC · JPL
458567	2011 ET_{61}	—	March 12, 2011	Mount Lemmon	Mount Lemmon Survey	EOS	1.6 km	MPC · JPL
458568	2011 EJ_{69}	—	March 10, 2011	Kitt Peak	Spacewatch	·	2.4 km	MPC · JPL
458569	2011 EZ_{70}	—	April 24, 2006	Kitt Peak	Spacewatch	·	3.1 km	MPC · JPL
458570	2011 EY_{72}	—	March 16, 2010	WISE	WISE	·	2.5 km	MPC · JPL
458571	2011 EE_{77}	—	October 18, 2009	Catalina	CSS	·	2.7 km	MPC · JPL
458572	2011 EM_{78}	—	March 2, 2011	Kitt Peak	Spacewatch	·	2.5 km	MPC · JPL
458573	2011 EJ_{83}	—	May 2, 2006	Mount Lemmon	Mount Lemmon Survey	THM	1.6 km	MPC · JPL
458574	2011 EP_{85}	—	January 27, 2006	Catalina	CSS	·	2.6 km	MPC · JPL
458575	2011 ES_{85}	—	March 7, 2010	WISE	WISE	·	3.0 km	MPC · JPL
458576	2011 EZ_{85}	—	February 26, 2011	Kitt Peak	Spacewatch	·	2.4 km	MPC · JPL
458577	2011 FJ_{3}	—	September 23, 2008	Kitt Peak	Spacewatch	·	1.8 km	MPC · JPL
458578	2011 FD_{4}	—	March 24, 2011	Catalina	CSS	·	2.5 km	MPC · JPL
458579	2011 FS_{5}	—	January 29, 2011	Kitt Peak	Spacewatch	·	1.5 km	MPC · JPL
458580	2011 FM_{7}	—	March 24, 2011	Catalina	CSS	·	3.5 km	MPC · JPL
458581	2011 FH_{8}	—	March 10, 2005	Mount Lemmon	Mount Lemmon Survey	THM	2.5 km	MPC · JPL
458582	2011 FL_{8}	—	March 26, 2011	Kitt Peak	Spacewatch	·	3.4 km	MPC · JPL
458583	2011 FX_{11}	—	October 20, 2008	Mount Lemmon	Mount Lemmon Survey	·	2.8 km	MPC · JPL
458584	2011 FL_{13}	—	March 27, 2011	Kitt Peak	Spacewatch	·	2.8 km	MPC · JPL
458585	2011 FD_{16}	—	March 2, 2011	Kitt Peak	Spacewatch	·	1.8 km	MPC · JPL
458586	2011 FK_{21}	—	April 24, 2006	Kitt Peak	Spacewatch	·	2.0 km	MPC · JPL
458587	2011 FA_{22}	—	October 7, 2008	Mount Lemmon	Mount Lemmon Survey	VER	3.3 km	MPC · JPL
458588	2011 FQ_{24}	—	March 10, 2011	Kitt Peak	Spacewatch	H	530 m	MPC · JPL
458589	2011 FZ_{25}	—	November 2, 2008	Mount Lemmon	Mount Lemmon Survey	EOS	2.0 km	MPC · JPL
458590	2011 FB_{27}	—	January 12, 2010	Kitt Peak	Spacewatch	·	2.2 km	MPC · JPL
458591	2011 FB_{28}	—	April 7, 2006	Kitt Peak	Spacewatch	·	1.8 km	MPC · JPL
458592	2011 FL_{28}	—	March 19, 2010	WISE	WISE	·	3.1 km	MPC · JPL
458593	2011 FG_{35}	—	March 29, 2011	Kitt Peak	Spacewatch	·	2.7 km	MPC · JPL
458594	2011 FH_{35}	—	April 2, 2006	Kitt Peak	Spacewatch	·	2.3 km	MPC · JPL
458595	2011 FC_{36}	—	December 11, 2004	Kitt Peak	Spacewatch	·	2.3 km	MPC · JPL
458596	2011 FA_{41}	—	September 23, 2008	Kitt Peak	Spacewatch	·	3.2 km	MPC · JPL
458597	2011 FU_{41}	—	February 5, 2011	Mount Lemmon	Mount Lemmon Survey	LIX	3.6 km	MPC · JPL
458598	2011 FL_{42}	—	March 9, 2011	XuYi	PMO NEO Survey Program	·	3.1 km	MPC · JPL
458599	2011 FU_{42}	—	September 22, 2003	Kitt Peak	Spacewatch	·	3.4 km	MPC · JPL
458600	2011 FJ_{43}	—	January 27, 2010	WISE	WISE	·	3.2 km	MPC · JPL

== 458601–458700 ==
back to top

Designation			Discovery			Properties		Ref
Permanent	Provisional	Named after	Date	Site	Discoverer(s)	Category	Diam.	Ref
458601	2011 FP_{43}	—	May 1, 2006	Kitt Peak	Spacewatch	·	3.0 km	MPC · JPL
458602	2011 FR_{43}	—	October 27, 2008	Mount Lemmon	Mount Lemmon Survey	·	2.7 km	MPC · JPL
458603	2011 FH_{44}	—	September 22, 2008	Kitt Peak	Spacewatch	·	2.2 km	MPC · JPL
458604	2011 FD_{45}	—	March 29, 2011	Kitt Peak	Spacewatch	·	3.1 km	MPC · JPL
458605	2011 FZ_{46}	—	March 3, 2005	Kitt Peak	Spacewatch	THM	2.2 km	MPC · JPL
458606	2011 FF_{50}	—	March 11, 2005	Mount Lemmon	Mount Lemmon Survey	·	2.7 km	MPC · JPL
458607	2011 FF_{53}	—	April 30, 2006	Kitt Peak	Spacewatch	·	1.3 km	MPC · JPL
458608	2011 FW_{53}	—	October 10, 2008	Kitt Peak	Spacewatch	·	2.5 km	MPC · JPL
458609	2011 FC_{57}	—	October 10, 2008	Mount Lemmon	Mount Lemmon Survey	BRA	1.3 km	MPC · JPL
458610	2011 FU_{57}	—	September 24, 2008	Kitt Peak	Spacewatch	·	2.9 km	MPC · JPL
458611	2011 FZ_{58}	—	March 26, 2006	Mount Lemmon	Mount Lemmon Survey	KOR	1.4 km	MPC · JPL
458612	2011 FX_{60}	—	March 14, 2011	Mount Lemmon	Mount Lemmon Survey	·	2.1 km	MPC · JPL
458613	2011 FZ_{62}	—	February 25, 2010	WISE	WISE	·	2.9 km	MPC · JPL
458614	2011 FZ_{65}	—	November 9, 2009	Kitt Peak	Spacewatch	·	3.6 km	MPC · JPL
458615	2011 FF_{67}	—	September 19, 2009	Mount Lemmon	Mount Lemmon Survey	LIX	3.2 km	MPC · JPL
458616	2011 FH_{69}	—	March 6, 2010	WISE	WISE	·	3.7 km	MPC · JPL
458617	2011 FD_{74}	—	February 23, 2011	Kitt Peak	Spacewatch	·	2.5 km	MPC · JPL
458618	2011 FR_{83}	—	September 16, 2009	Mount Lemmon	Mount Lemmon Survey	·	2.0 km	MPC · JPL
458619	2011 FX_{83}	—	September 14, 2007	Catalina	CSS	·	3.6 km	MPC · JPL
458620	2011 FP_{84}	—	March 11, 2011	Catalina	CSS	EOS	2.2 km	MPC · JPL
458621	2011 FJ_{85}	—	May 25, 2006	Kitt Peak	Spacewatch	·	2.9 km	MPC · JPL
458622	2011 FG_{88}	—	February 17, 2010	WISE	WISE	·	3.6 km	MPC · JPL
458623	2011 FP_{94}	—	March 4, 2006	Kitt Peak	Spacewatch	·	1.7 km	MPC · JPL
458624	2011 FZ_{131}	—	February 8, 2011	Mount Lemmon	Mount Lemmon Survey	·	2.9 km	MPC · JPL
458625	2011 FB_{132}	—	March 25, 2011	Catalina	CSS	·	4.2 km	MPC · JPL
458626	2011 FH_{133}	—	September 3, 2008	Kitt Peak	Spacewatch	EOS	1.5 km	MPC · JPL
458627	2011 FM_{133}	—	September 23, 2008	Kitt Peak	Spacewatch	EOS	1.6 km	MPC · JPL
458628	2011 FP_{138}	—	October 18, 2003	Kitt Peak	Spacewatch	·	2.0 km	MPC · JPL
458629	2011 FT_{141}	—	March 8, 2000	Socorro	LINEAR	·	2.8 km	MPC · JPL
458630	2011 FO_{142}	—	September 25, 2008	Kitt Peak	Spacewatch	·	5.8 km	MPC · JPL
458631	2011 FH_{143}	—	March 29, 2000	Kitt Peak	Spacewatch	·	2.3 km	MPC · JPL
458632	2011 FR_{144}	—	January 16, 2005	Catalina	CSS	·	2.7 km	MPC · JPL
458633	2011 FR_{145}	—	February 2, 2005	Socorro	LINEAR	TIR	3.4 km	MPC · JPL
458634	2011 FX_{146}	—	December 27, 2009	Kitt Peak	Spacewatch	·	3.8 km	MPC · JPL
458635	2011 FV_{152}	—	March 29, 2011	Kitt Peak	Spacewatch	H	510 m	MPC · JPL
458636	2011 FY_{152}	—	March 28, 2011	Catalina	CSS	H	550 m	MPC · JPL
458637	2011 FB_{156}	—	April 26, 2006	Siding Spring	SSS	·	3.3 km	MPC · JPL
458638	2011 FR_{156}	—	February 1, 2005	Kitt Peak	Spacewatch	·	3.0 km	MPC · JPL
458639	2011 GN_{9}	—	April 2, 2011	Kitt Peak	Spacewatch	·	3.3 km	MPC · JPL
458640	2011 GV_{13}	—	February 29, 2000	Socorro	LINEAR	·	2.6 km	MPC · JPL
458641	2011 GQ_{23}	—	November 9, 2008	Kitt Peak	Spacewatch	·	2.9 km	MPC · JPL
458642	2011 GH_{24}	—	April 4, 2005	Mount Lemmon	Mount Lemmon Survey	·	2.6 km	MPC · JPL
458643	2011 GH_{35}	—	February 10, 2011	Mount Lemmon	Mount Lemmon Survey	·	2.0 km	MPC · JPL
458644	2011 GN_{35}	—	January 14, 1999	Kitt Peak	Spacewatch	·	3.1 km	MPC · JPL
458645	2011 GW_{36}	—	March 1, 2011	Mount Lemmon	Mount Lemmon Survey	H	530 m	MPC · JPL
458646	2011 GM_{53}	—	May 24, 2006	Kitt Peak	Spacewatch	·	2.7 km	MPC · JPL
458647	2011 GZ_{55}	—	January 15, 2005	Kitt Peak	Spacewatch	·	3.1 km	MPC · JPL
458648	2011 GX_{56}	—	May 2, 2006	Kitt Peak	Spacewatch	·	2.8 km	MPC · JPL
458649	2011 GP_{57}	—	March 27, 2011	Mount Lemmon	Mount Lemmon Survey	·	2.7 km	MPC · JPL
458650	2011 GS_{57}	—	March 31, 2010	WISE	WISE	·	3.5 km	MPC · JPL
458651	2011 GC_{58}	—	February 26, 2010	WISE	WISE	·	4.1 km	MPC · JPL
458652	2011 GE_{58}	—	March 1, 2005	Kitt Peak	Spacewatch	·	2.2 km	MPC · JPL
458653	2011 GZ_{59}	—	March 10, 2005	Catalina	CSS	·	2.9 km	MPC · JPL
458654	2011 GF_{64}	—	May 20, 2006	Kitt Peak	Spacewatch	·	1.8 km	MPC · JPL
458655	2011 GH_{67}	—	October 27, 2009	Kitt Peak	Spacewatch	·	2.9 km	MPC · JPL
458656	2011 GB_{68}	—	January 6, 2010	Mount Lemmon	Mount Lemmon Survey	·	2.8 km	MPC · JPL
458657	2011 GO_{68}	—	March 27, 2010	WISE	WISE	T_{j} (2.96)	3.8 km	MPC · JPL
458658	2011 GF_{73}	—	November 24, 2003	Socorro	LINEAR	T_{j} (2.96)	4.1 km	MPC · JPL
458659	2011 GQ_{75}	—	May 20, 2006	Kitt Peak	Spacewatch	·	1.4 km	MPC · JPL
458660	2011 GR_{76}	—	March 26, 2011	Mount Lemmon	Mount Lemmon Survey	EOS	2.3 km	MPC · JPL
458661	2011 GS_{76}	—	March 26, 2011	Mount Lemmon	Mount Lemmon Survey	·	3.1 km	MPC · JPL
458662	2011 GO_{78}	—	May 29, 2000	Anderson Mesa	LONEOS	T_{j} (2.96)	4.6 km	MPC · JPL
458663	2011 GH_{79}	—	April 1, 2011	Mount Lemmon	Mount Lemmon Survey	·	2.7 km	MPC · JPL
458664	2011 GT_{81}	—	February 9, 2010	Mount Lemmon	Mount Lemmon Survey	THM	2.0 km	MPC · JPL
458665	2011 GV_{82}	—	January 12, 2010	Mount Lemmon	Mount Lemmon Survey	·	2.4 km	MPC · JPL
458666	2011 GW_{83}	—	October 27, 2008	Mount Lemmon	Mount Lemmon Survey	VER	3.6 km	MPC · JPL
458667	2011 GV_{85}	—	February 9, 2005	Mount Lemmon	Mount Lemmon Survey	THM	2.2 km	MPC · JPL
458668	2011 GG_{86}	—	January 28, 2011	Mount Lemmon	Mount Lemmon Survey	·	2.7 km	MPC · JPL
458669	2011 GJ_{86}	—	February 25, 2011	Kitt Peak	Spacewatch	·	2.7 km	MPC · JPL
458670	2011 GY_{87}	—	January 8, 2011	Mount Lemmon	Mount Lemmon Survey	·	3.0 km	MPC · JPL
458671	2011 HH_{3}	—	November 7, 2008	Mount Lemmon	Mount Lemmon Survey	·	3.1 km	MPC · JPL
458672	2011 HK_{3}	—	April 13, 2010	WISE	WISE	EOS	3.1 km	MPC · JPL
458673	2011 HZ_{8}	—	March 27, 2011	Mount Lemmon	Mount Lemmon Survey	·	3.5 km	MPC · JPL
458674	2011 HN_{11}	—	February 5, 2010	Catalina	CSS	·	3.2 km	MPC · JPL
458675	2011 HJ_{17}	—	November 19, 2009	Kitt Peak	Spacewatch	·	3.1 km	MPC · JPL
458676	2011 HL_{18}	—	April 6, 2011	Mount Lemmon	Mount Lemmon Survey	·	2.4 km	MPC · JPL
458677	2011 HG_{29}	—	October 26, 2008	Kitt Peak	Spacewatch	·	3.0 km	MPC · JPL
458678	2011 HC_{34}	—	March 26, 2011	Kitt Peak	Spacewatch	·	2.8 km	MPC · JPL
458679	2011 HA_{36}	—	November 7, 2008	Mount Lemmon	Mount Lemmon Survey	·	3.0 km	MPC · JPL
458680	2011 HD_{38}	—	February 5, 2011	Mount Lemmon	Mount Lemmon Survey	EOS	2.3 km	MPC · JPL
458681	2011 HJ_{38}	—	January 12, 2010	Kitt Peak	Spacewatch	LIX	3.3 km	MPC · JPL
458682	2011 HY_{38}	—	March 1, 2005	Kitt Peak	Spacewatch	·	2.7 km	MPC · JPL
458683	2011 HD_{40}	—	October 27, 2009	Mount Lemmon	Mount Lemmon Survey	·	2.0 km	MPC · JPL
458684	2011 HK_{40}	—	April 26, 2010	WISE	WISE	·	3.7 km	MPC · JPL
458685	2011 HX_{44}	—	February 12, 2011	Mount Lemmon	Mount Lemmon Survey	·	3.1 km	MPC · JPL
458686	2011 HV_{48}	—	August 10, 2007	Kitt Peak	Spacewatch	·	2.5 km	MPC · JPL
458687	2011 HE_{49}	—	October 25, 2008	Mount Lemmon	Mount Lemmon Survey	·	2.8 km	MPC · JPL
458688	2011 HS_{50}	—	April 28, 2010	WISE	WISE	·	2.7 km	MPC · JPL
458689	2011 HL_{54}	—	September 10, 2007	Kitt Peak	Spacewatch	·	2.7 km	MPC · JPL
458690	2011 HK_{56}	—	November 19, 2008	Kitt Peak	Spacewatch	·	4.2 km	MPC · JPL
458691	2011 HV_{56}	—	April 24, 2011	Kitt Peak	Spacewatch	·	3.6 km	MPC · JPL
458692	2011 HG_{57}	—	February 15, 1994	Kitt Peak	Spacewatch	·	2.6 km	MPC · JPL
458693	2011 HU_{57}	—	April 8, 2010	WISE	WISE	·	3.4 km	MPC · JPL
458694	2011 HY_{58}	—	November 7, 2008	Mount Lemmon	Mount Lemmon Survey	·	4.0 km	MPC · JPL
458695	2011 HD_{61}	—	April 14, 2011	Mount Lemmon	Mount Lemmon Survey	·	2.9 km	MPC · JPL
458696	2011 HX_{63}	—	March 26, 2011	Kitt Peak	Spacewatch	·	1.7 km	MPC · JPL
458697	2011 HT_{65}	—	March 3, 2005	Catalina	CSS	LIX	3.1 km	MPC · JPL
458698	2011 HX_{65}	—	March 4, 2005	Kitt Peak	Spacewatch	HYG	2.7 km	MPC · JPL
458699	2011 HA_{66}	—	March 8, 2011	Kitt Peak	Spacewatch	·	2.2 km	MPC · JPL
458700	2011 HK_{67}	—	April 23, 2011	Kitt Peak	Spacewatch	·	3.5 km	MPC · JPL

== 458701–458800 ==
back to top

Designation			Discovery			Properties		Ref
Permanent	Provisional	Named after	Date	Site	Discoverer(s)	Category	Diam.	Ref
458701	2011 HZ_{71}	—	November 19, 2008	Mount Lemmon	Mount Lemmon Survey	·	2.6 km	MPC · JPL
458702	2011 HT_{72}	—	April 5, 2000	Socorro	LINEAR	·	2.5 km	MPC · JPL
458703	2011 HU_{73}	—	May 10, 1997	Kitt Peak	Spacewatch	CYB	4.5 km	MPC · JPL
458704	2011 HA_{76}	—	March 9, 2010	WISE	WISE	·	3.4 km	MPC · JPL
458705	2011 HH_{83}	—	June 13, 1999	Catalina	CSS	CYB	3.4 km	MPC · JPL
458706	2011 HH_{84}	—	February 9, 2010	Catalina	CSS	·	4.4 km	MPC · JPL
458707	2011 HB_{85}	—	March 31, 2001	Kitt Peak	Spacewatch	·	3.7 km	MPC · JPL
458708	2011 HK_{85}	—	October 11, 2007	Catalina	CSS	·	3.7 km	MPC · JPL
458709	2011 HM_{86}	—	November 20, 2008	Kitt Peak	Spacewatch	EOS	1.9 km	MPC · JPL
458710	2011 HZ_{95}	—	March 4, 2005	Mount Lemmon	Mount Lemmon Survey	THM	2.3 km	MPC · JPL
458711	2011 HW_{102}	—	April 12, 2011	Catalina	CSS	·	3.0 km	MPC · JPL
458712	2011 JV	—	January 16, 2005	Kitt Peak	Spacewatch	·	2.6 km	MPC · JPL
458713	2011 JB_{1}	—	November 19, 2009	Mount Lemmon	Mount Lemmon Survey	·	5.2 km	MPC · JPL
458714	2011 JM_{2}	—	April 3, 2011	Mount Lemmon	Mount Lemmon Survey	H	660 m	MPC · JPL
458715	2011 JG_{7}	—	May 30, 2006	Mount Lemmon	Mount Lemmon Survey	·	3.2 km	MPC · JPL
458716	2011 JD_{9}	—	November 17, 2009	Mount Lemmon	Mount Lemmon Survey	THB	2.7 km	MPC · JPL
458717	2011 JP_{14}	—	April 28, 2011	Kitt Peak	Spacewatch	·	3.2 km	MPC · JPL
458718	2011 JX_{14}	—	April 28, 2011	Kitt Peak	Spacewatch	·	3.6 km	MPC · JPL
458719	2011 JL_{17}	—	June 5, 1995	Kitt Peak	Spacewatch	EOS	2.0 km	MPC · JPL
458720	2011 JQ_{29}	—	January 30, 2008	Kitt Peak	Spacewatch	H	490 m	MPC · JPL
458721	2011 KV_{1}	—	January 11, 2010	Kitt Peak	Spacewatch	·	3.1 km	MPC · JPL
458722	2011 KK_{12}	—	July 23, 2006	Mount Lemmon	Mount Lemmon Survey	H	780 m	MPC · JPL
458723	2011 KQ_{12}	—	May 22, 2011	Mount Lemmon	Mount Lemmon Survey	APO · PHA	450 m	MPC · JPL
458724	2011 KB_{14}	—	May 3, 2011	Kitt Peak	Spacewatch	VER	2.9 km	MPC · JPL
458725	2011 KW_{18}	—	May 27, 2011	Kitt Peak	Spacewatch	H	570 m	MPC · JPL
458726	2011 KM_{21}	—	November 17, 2009	Kitt Peak	Spacewatch	·	4.0 km	MPC · JPL
458727	2011 KM_{23}	—	March 9, 2005	Mount Lemmon	Mount Lemmon Survey	·	2.2 km	MPC · JPL
458728	2011 LH_{4}	—	October 17, 2006	Kitt Peak	Spacewatch	CYB	3.8 km	MPC · JPL
458729	2011 LO_{4}	—	March 25, 2010	Kitt Peak	Spacewatch	THB	2.6 km	MPC · JPL
458730	2011 LA_{20}	—	June 9, 2011	Mount Lemmon	Mount Lemmon Survey	L5	9.2 km	MPC · JPL
458731	2011 LR_{23}	—	May 31, 2010	WISE	WISE	EOS	1.9 km	MPC · JPL
458732	2011 MD_{5}	—	June 30, 2011	Haleakala	Pan-STARRS 1	APO +1km · moon	970 m	MPC · JPL
458733	2011 NN_{2}	—	July 1, 2011	Kitt Peak	Spacewatch	H	570 m	MPC · JPL
458734	2011 OC_{3}	—	February 6, 2007	Mount Lemmon	Mount Lemmon Survey	·	1.2 km	MPC · JPL
458735	2011 OA_{39}	—	July 2, 2011	Kitt Peak	Spacewatch	L5	7.5 km	MPC · JPL
458736	2011 OL_{44}	—	June 11, 2011	Mount Lemmon	Mount Lemmon Survey	·	1.0 km	MPC · JPL
458737	2011 OS_{56}	—	June 26, 2011	Mount Lemmon	Mount Lemmon Survey	·	660 m	MPC · JPL
458738	2011 QB_{18}	—	July 19, 2004	Anderson Mesa	LONEOS	·	570 m	MPC · JPL
458739	2011 QE_{27}	—	November 17, 2008	Catalina	CSS	·	700 m	MPC · JPL
458740	2011 QF_{27}	—	October 28, 1994	Kitt Peak	Spacewatch	·	820 m	MPC · JPL
458741	2011 QH_{27}	—	January 25, 2006	Kitt Peak	Spacewatch	·	530 m	MPC · JPL
458742	2011 QZ_{32}	—	February 25, 2006	Kitt Peak	Spacewatch	V	600 m	MPC · JPL
458743	2011 QM_{34}	—	December 5, 2008	Mount Lemmon	Mount Lemmon Survey	·	820 m	MPC · JPL
458744	2011 QE_{35}	—	October 17, 2001	Kitt Peak	Spacewatch	·	720 m	MPC · JPL
458745	2011 QY_{37}	—	August 27, 2011	Mayhill	L. Elenin	AMO	730 m	MPC · JPL
458746	2011 QB_{42}	—	September 24, 2000	Socorro	LINEAR	·	1.4 km	MPC · JPL
458747	2011 QP_{47}	—	June 22, 2010	Mount Lemmon	Mount Lemmon Survey	L5	9.8 km	MPC · JPL
458748	2011 QJ_{72}	—	January 31, 2006	Kitt Peak	Spacewatch	·	790 m	MPC · JPL
458749	2011 QP_{74}	—	February 1, 2006	Mount Lemmon	Mount Lemmon Survey	L5	9.8 km	MPC · JPL
458750	2011 QK_{91}	—	September 25, 2000	Kitt Peak	Spacewatch	NYS	860 m	MPC · JPL
458751	2011 QB_{92}	—	November 21, 2008	Kitt Peak	Spacewatch	·	570 m	MPC · JPL
458752	2011 QS_{95}	—	March 15, 2004	Kitt Peak	Spacewatch	T_{j} (2.98)	3.8 km	MPC · JPL
458753	2011 QW_{96}	—	October 9, 2004	Kitt Peak	Spacewatch	·	580 m	MPC · JPL
458754	2011 RF_{4}	—	October 10, 2004	Kitt Peak	Spacewatch	·	710 m	MPC · JPL
458755	2011 RU_{10}	—	November 23, 2008	Kitt Peak	Spacewatch	·	700 m	MPC · JPL
458756	2011 RQ_{11}	—	June 27, 2011	Mount Lemmon	Mount Lemmon Survey	·	1.1 km	MPC · JPL
458757	2011 RX_{16}	—	September 7, 2011	Kitt Peak	Spacewatch	·	610 m	MPC · JPL
458758	2011 SU	—	September 7, 2004	Kitt Peak	Spacewatch	·	510 m	MPC · JPL
458759	2011 SP_{6}	—	December 4, 2008	Mount Lemmon	Mount Lemmon Survey	·	570 m	MPC · JPL
458760	2011 SD_{10}	—	March 14, 2010	WISE	WISE	·	3.4 km	MPC · JPL
458761	2011 SV_{10}	—	December 30, 2008	Kitt Peak	Spacewatch	·	470 m	MPC · JPL
458762	2011 SJ_{33}	—	November 19, 2001	Socorro	LINEAR	·	770 m	MPC · JPL
458763	2011 SV_{33}	—	December 18, 2001	Socorro	LINEAR	·	670 m	MPC · JPL
458764	2011 SY_{34}	—	February 26, 2009	Kitt Peak	Spacewatch	·	1.1 km	MPC · JPL
458765	2011 SM_{49}	—	November 20, 2001	Socorro	LINEAR	·	500 m	MPC · JPL
458766	2011 SR_{55}	—	January 25, 2009	Kitt Peak	Spacewatch	·	780 m	MPC · JPL
458767	2011 SH_{57}	—	September 23, 2011	Mount Lemmon	Mount Lemmon Survey	MAS	630 m	MPC · JPL
458768	2011 SK_{57}	—	November 17, 2004	Campo Imperatore	CINEOS	·	640 m	MPC · JPL
458769	2011 SF_{64}	—	August 7, 2004	Campo Imperatore	CINEOS	·	600 m	MPC · JPL
458770	2011 SH_{66}	—	September 7, 2008	Mount Lemmon	Mount Lemmon Survey	PHO	1.8 km	MPC · JPL
458771	2011 SL_{67}	—	September 18, 2011	Catalina	CSS	·	1.2 km	MPC · JPL
458772	2011 SP_{67}	—	September 8, 2011	Kitt Peak	Spacewatch	·	590 m	MPC · JPL
458773	2011 ST_{84}	—	April 9, 2003	Kitt Peak	Spacewatch	·	840 m	MPC · JPL
458774	2011 SJ_{87}	—	March 2, 2006	Kitt Peak	Spacewatch	V	700 m	MPC · JPL
458775	2011 SK_{97}	—	August 31, 2011	Siding Spring	SSS	·	790 m	MPC · JPL
458776	2011 SP_{99}	—	October 1, 2000	Socorro	LINEAR	·	1.2 km	MPC · JPL
458777	2011 SR_{103}	—	October 16, 1977	Palomar	C. J. van Houten, I. van Houten-Groeneveld, T. Gehrels	·	700 m	MPC · JPL
458778	2011 SN_{105}	—	September 23, 2011	Kitt Peak	Spacewatch	·	590 m	MPC · JPL
458779	2011 SS_{108}	—	October 22, 2008	Kitt Peak	Spacewatch	·	680 m	MPC · JPL
458780	2011 SU_{114}	—	October 10, 2004	Socorro	LINEAR	·	720 m	MPC · JPL
458781	2011 SY_{116}	—	November 10, 2004	Kitt Peak	Spacewatch	NYS	890 m	MPC · JPL
458782	2011 SD_{119}	—	October 9, 2004	Kitt Peak	Spacewatch	·	920 m	MPC · JPL
458783	2011 SE_{119}	—	August 14, 2004	Campo Imperatore	CINEOS	·	780 m	MPC · JPL
458784	2011 SQ_{125}	—	December 30, 2008	Mount Lemmon	Mount Lemmon Survey	·	610 m	MPC · JPL
458785	2011 SH_{128}	—	September 23, 2011	Kitt Peak	Spacewatch	·	690 m	MPC · JPL
458786	2011 SB_{133}	—	February 27, 2009	Kitt Peak	Spacewatch	·	1.1 km	MPC · JPL
458787	2011 SC_{133}	—	April 9, 2010	Kitt Peak	Spacewatch	·	1.3 km	MPC · JPL
458788	2011 SE_{135}	—	November 17, 2000	Kitt Peak	Spacewatch	MAS	690 m	MPC · JPL
458789	2011 SL_{135}	—	January 18, 2009	Kitt Peak	Spacewatch	·	700 m	MPC · JPL
458790	2011 SM_{140}	—	September 11, 2007	Mount Lemmon	Mount Lemmon Survey	NYS	1.0 km	MPC · JPL
458791	2011 SY_{160}	—	December 21, 2008	Mount Lemmon	Mount Lemmon Survey	·	550 m	MPC · JPL
458792	2011 SV_{163}	—	February 25, 2006	Kitt Peak	Spacewatch	·	630 m	MPC · JPL
458793	2011 SS_{167}	—	September 28, 2011	Kitt Peak	Spacewatch	MAS	810 m	MPC · JPL
458794	2011 SW_{170}	—	February 4, 2009	Mount Lemmon	Mount Lemmon Survey	·	770 m	MPC · JPL
458795	2011 SJ_{171}	—	September 28, 2011	Mount Lemmon	Mount Lemmon Survey	·	650 m	MPC · JPL
458796	2011 SL_{171}	—	September 28, 2011	Mount Lemmon	Mount Lemmon Survey	·	500 m	MPC · JPL
458797	2011 SH_{175}	—	September 8, 2011	Kitt Peak	Spacewatch	·	750 m	MPC · JPL
458798	2011 SG_{184}	—	September 12, 2007	Mount Lemmon	Mount Lemmon Survey	NYS	1.0 km	MPC · JPL
458799	2011 SU_{189}	—	September 13, 2004	Kitt Peak	Spacewatch	·	620 m	MPC · JPL
458800	2011 SV_{189}	—	October 7, 2004	Kitt Peak	Spacewatch	·	680 m	MPC · JPL

== 458801–458900 ==
back to top

Designation			Discovery			Properties		Ref
Permanent	Provisional	Named after	Date	Site	Discoverer(s)	Category	Diam.	Ref
458801	2011 SM_{201}	—	October 11, 2004	Kitt Peak	Spacewatch	·	590 m	MPC · JPL
458802	2011 SW_{202}	—	March 3, 2006	Kitt Peak	Spacewatch	·	620 m	MPC · JPL
458803	2011 SR_{205}	—	October 28, 1997	Kitt Peak	Spacewatch	·	750 m	MPC · JPL
458804	2011 ST_{207}	—	September 20, 2011	Kitt Peak	Spacewatch	MAS	700 m	MPC · JPL
458805	2011 SU_{219}	—	September 26, 2011	Kitt Peak	Spacewatch	·	630 m	MPC · JPL
458806	2011 SN_{221}	—	September 8, 2011	Kitt Peak	Spacewatch	·	670 m	MPC · JPL
458807	2011 SB_{225}	—	August 25, 2004	Kitt Peak	Spacewatch	·	690 m	MPC · JPL
458808	2011 SD_{231}	—	July 3, 2011	Mount Lemmon	Mount Lemmon Survey	·	650 m	MPC · JPL
458809	2011 SX_{232}	—	December 30, 2008	Mount Lemmon	Mount Lemmon Survey	·	610 m	MPC · JPL
458810	2011 SA_{236}	—	September 13, 2007	Catalina	CSS	·	1.3 km	MPC · JPL
458811	2011 SU_{245}	—	October 9, 2004	Kitt Peak	Spacewatch	·	740 m	MPC · JPL
458812	2011 SE_{256}	—	March 13, 2010	Mount Lemmon	Mount Lemmon Survey	·	2.3 km	MPC · JPL
458813	2011 SH_{256}	—	December 19, 2004	Mount Lemmon	Mount Lemmon Survey	MAS	680 m	MPC · JPL
458814	2011 SY_{256}	—	December 15, 2004	Socorro	LINEAR	·	1.1 km	MPC · JPL
458815	2011 SC_{260}	—	February 26, 2009	Kitt Peak	Spacewatch	NYS	700 m	MPC · JPL
458816	2011 SF_{274}	—	August 3, 2004	Siding Spring	SSS	·	790 m	MPC · JPL
458817	2011 TE_{6}	—	November 8, 2008	Mount Lemmon	Mount Lemmon Survey	·	910 m	MPC · JPL
458818	2011 TG_{8}	—	September 20, 2011	Kitt Peak	Spacewatch	·	820 m	MPC · JPL
458819	2011 TY_{12}	—	August 22, 2004	Kitt Peak	Spacewatch	·	740 m	MPC · JPL
458820	2011 TT_{14}	—	August 28, 2011	Siding Spring	SSS	·	1.3 km	MPC · JPL
458821	2011 UY	—	September 23, 2011	Kitt Peak	Spacewatch	·	630 m	MPC · JPL
458822	2011 UB_{1}	—	October 11, 2004	Kitt Peak	Spacewatch	·	560 m	MPC · JPL
458823	2011 UH_{2}	—	October 1, 2011	Kitt Peak	Spacewatch	V	520 m	MPC · JPL
458824	2011 UF_{6}	—	August 24, 2007	Kitt Peak	Spacewatch	NYS	780 m	MPC · JPL
458825	2011 UR_{8}	—	October 23, 2004	Kitt Peak	Spacewatch	·	540 m	MPC · JPL
458826	2011 UD_{10}	—	September 3, 2007	Catalina	CSS	·	990 m	MPC · JPL
458827	2011 UB_{14}	—	October 15, 2004	Socorro	LINEAR	·	1.0 km	MPC · JPL
458828	2011 UV_{17}	—	October 7, 2004	Anderson Mesa	LONEOS	·	910 m	MPC · JPL
458829	2011 UB_{22}	—	January 2, 2009	Mount Lemmon	Mount Lemmon Survey	·	1.7 km	MPC · JPL
458830	2011 UQ_{22}	—	August 24, 2000	Socorro	LINEAR	·	1.1 km	MPC · JPL
458831	2011 UE_{28}	—	October 17, 2011	Kitt Peak	Spacewatch	(2076)	690 m	MPC · JPL
458832	2011 UJ_{28}	—	December 30, 2008	Kitt Peak	Spacewatch	·	970 m	MPC · JPL
458833	2011 UR_{28}	—	October 17, 2011	Kitt Peak	Spacewatch	·	950 m	MPC · JPL
458834	2011 UU_{29}	—	September 4, 2007	Mount Lemmon	Mount Lemmon Survey	·	890 m	MPC · JPL
458835	2011 UA_{30}	—	October 6, 2000	Anderson Mesa	LONEOS	·	1.1 km	MPC · JPL
458836	2011 UK_{30}	—	September 23, 2011	Mount Lemmon	Mount Lemmon Survey	·	950 m	MPC · JPL
458837	2011 UH_{40}	—	September 21, 2011	Kitt Peak	Spacewatch	·	600 m	MPC · JPL
458838	2011 UP_{41}	—	September 30, 2011	Kitt Peak	Spacewatch	·	550 m	MPC · JPL
458839	2011 UV_{42}	—	September 26, 2011	Kitt Peak	Spacewatch	·	590 m	MPC · JPL
458840	2011 UW_{45}	—	September 20, 2011	Kitt Peak	Spacewatch	·	1.1 km	MPC · JPL
458841	2011 UA_{53}	—	December 19, 2004	Mount Lemmon	Mount Lemmon Survey	NYS	1.2 km	MPC · JPL
458842	2011 UT_{53}	—	October 18, 2011	Kitt Peak	Spacewatch	·	1.1 km	MPC · JPL
458843	2011 UB_{55}	—	September 23, 2011	Mount Lemmon	Mount Lemmon Survey	·	920 m	MPC · JPL
458844	2011 UZ_{56}	—	June 29, 1997	Kitt Peak	Spacewatch	·	770 m	MPC · JPL
458845	2011 UV_{59}	—	November 19, 2004	Catalina	CSS	·	740 m	MPC · JPL
458846	2011 UR_{65}	—	September 20, 2011	Kitt Peak	Spacewatch	CLA	1.9 km	MPC · JPL
458847	2011 UC_{67}	—	February 3, 2009	Kitt Peak	Spacewatch	NYS	1.1 km	MPC · JPL
458848	2011 UV_{70}	—	October 22, 2011	Mount Lemmon	Mount Lemmon Survey	·	1.3 km	MPC · JPL
458849	2011 UX_{74}	—	October 19, 2011	Kitt Peak	Spacewatch	·	690 m	MPC · JPL
458850	2011 UH_{75}	—	September 30, 2011	Kitt Peak	Spacewatch	·	950 m	MPC · JPL
458851	2011 UC_{76}	—	September 13, 2005	Kitt Peak	Spacewatch	EOS	1.9 km	MPC · JPL
458852	2011 UR_{80}	—	September 11, 2007	Mount Lemmon	Mount Lemmon Survey	MAS	520 m	MPC · JPL
458853	2011 UW_{80}	—	September 23, 2011	Mount Lemmon	Mount Lemmon Survey	·	780 m	MPC · JPL
458854	2011 UK_{83}	—	November 4, 2004	Kitt Peak	Spacewatch	·	720 m	MPC · JPL
458855	2011 UK_{84}	—	October 19, 2011	Kitt Peak	Spacewatch	·	950 m	MPC · JPL
458856	2011 UH_{85}	—	October 19, 2011	Kitt Peak	Spacewatch	·	660 m	MPC · JPL
458857	2011 UT_{87}	—	October 21, 2011	Mount Lemmon	Mount Lemmon Survey	·	1.3 km	MPC · JPL
458858	2011 UX_{94}	—	October 19, 2011	Mount Lemmon	Mount Lemmon Survey	·	770 m	MPC · JPL
458859	2011 UY_{95}	—	January 20, 2009	Kitt Peak	Spacewatch	·	860 m	MPC · JPL
458860	2011 UA_{100}	—	October 7, 2004	Kitt Peak	Spacewatch	·	650 m	MPC · JPL
458861	2011 UF_{101}	—	September 21, 2011	Kitt Peak	Spacewatch	·	560 m	MPC · JPL
458862	2011 UP_{101}	—	October 20, 2011	Mount Lemmon	Mount Lemmon Survey	·	1.0 km	MPC · JPL
458863	2011 UX_{115}	—	September 10, 2004	Kitt Peak	Spacewatch	·	620 m	MPC · JPL
458864	2011 UW_{116}	—	October 1, 2011	Kitt Peak	Spacewatch	·	1.1 km	MPC · JPL
458865	2011 UG_{119}	—	January 16, 2009	Kitt Peak	Spacewatch	·	740 m	MPC · JPL
458866	2011 UZ_{122}	—	October 7, 2004	Kitt Peak	Spacewatch	·	610 m	MPC · JPL
458867	2011 UO_{127}	—	October 20, 2011	Kitt Peak	Spacewatch	·	1.5 km	MPC · JPL
458868	2011 UT_{127}	—	October 10, 2007	Catalina	CSS	·	1.3 km	MPC · JPL
458869	2011 UO_{129}	—	January 18, 2009	Mount Lemmon	Mount Lemmon Survey	·	610 m	MPC · JPL
458870	2011 UZ_{129}	—	December 13, 2004	Kitt Peak	Spacewatch	·	1.1 km	MPC · JPL
458871	2011 UM_{132}	—	January 20, 2009	Kitt Peak	Spacewatch	·	590 m	MPC · JPL
458872	2011 UL_{135}	—	December 21, 2008	Kitt Peak	Spacewatch	·	1.1 km	MPC · JPL
458873	2011 UO_{137}	—	October 15, 2004	Mount Lemmon	Mount Lemmon Survey	NYS	800 m	MPC · JPL
458874	2011 UJ_{138}	—	September 24, 2011	Mount Lemmon	Mount Lemmon Survey	V	710 m	MPC · JPL
458875	2011 UG_{139}	—	October 22, 2011	Kitt Peak	Spacewatch	·	540 m	MPC · JPL
458876	2011 UC_{146}	—	November 17, 2000	Kitt Peak	Spacewatch	·	920 m	MPC · JPL
458877	2011 UB_{151}	—	September 22, 2011	Mount Lemmon	Mount Lemmon Survey	NYS	1.1 km	MPC · JPL
458878	2011 UG_{152}	—	September 24, 2011	Mount Lemmon	Mount Lemmon Survey	·	800 m	MPC · JPL
458879	2011 UM_{153}	—	October 22, 2011	Kitt Peak	Spacewatch	(2076)	710 m	MPC · JPL
458880	2011 UG_{161}	—	September 11, 2007	Kitt Peak	Spacewatch	MAS	770 m	MPC · JPL
458881	2011 UL_{163}	—	October 19, 2011	Kitt Peak	Spacewatch	·	690 m	MPC · JPL
458882	2011 UV_{163}	—	October 23, 2011	Kitt Peak	Spacewatch	·	1.1 km	MPC · JPL
458883	2011 UE_{164}	—	October 18, 2011	Catalina	CSS	V	900 m	MPC · JPL
458884	2011 UZ_{164}	—	October 19, 2011	Catalina	CSS	·	950 m	MPC · JPL
458885	2011 UU_{166}	—	January 17, 2009	Kitt Peak	Spacewatch	·	1.2 km	MPC · JPL
458886	2011 UU_{173}	—	October 23, 2011	Kitt Peak	Spacewatch	·	1.4 km	MPC · JPL
458887	2011 US_{174}	—	March 13, 2005	Mount Lemmon	Mount Lemmon Survey	·	1.0 km	MPC · JPL
458888	2011 UQ_{175}	—	January 18, 2009	Kitt Peak	Spacewatch	V	760 m	MPC · JPL
458889	2011 UH_{177}	—	October 20, 2011	Kitt Peak	Spacewatch	·	640 m	MPC · JPL
458890	2011 UM_{178}	—	October 24, 2011	Kitt Peak	Spacewatch	NYS	720 m	MPC · JPL
458891	2011 UG_{179}	—	October 24, 2011	Kitt Peak	Spacewatch	·	1.3 km	MPC · JPL
458892	2011 UQ_{182}	—	November 19, 2007	Kitt Peak	Spacewatch	·	1.4 km	MPC · JPL
458893	2011 UG_{185}	—	February 1, 2009	Kitt Peak	Spacewatch	·	1.2 km	MPC · JPL
458894	2011 UU_{187}	—	December 3, 2008	Mount Lemmon	Mount Lemmon Survey	·	1.3 km	MPC · JPL
458895	2011 UQ_{195}	—	December 31, 2008	Mount Lemmon	Mount Lemmon Survey	·	790 m	MPC · JPL
458896	2011 UZ_{198}	—	October 25, 2011	Kitt Peak	Spacewatch	·	1.0 km	MPC · JPL
458897	2011 UV_{201}	—	March 31, 2009	Kitt Peak	Spacewatch	NYS	920 m	MPC · JPL
458898	2011 UT_{202}	—	September 27, 2000	Socorro	LINEAR	·	830 m	MPC · JPL
458899	2011 UW_{202}	—	September 10, 2007	Mount Lemmon	Mount Lemmon Survey	·	960 m	MPC · JPL
458900	2011 UT_{203}	—	September 11, 2007	Kitt Peak	Spacewatch	NYS	880 m	MPC · JPL

== 458901–459000 ==
back to top

Designation			Discovery			Properties		Ref
Permanent	Provisional	Named after	Date	Site	Discoverer(s)	Category	Diam.	Ref
458901	2011 UZ_{203}	—	September 13, 2007	Mount Lemmon	Mount Lemmon Survey	·	750 m	MPC · JPL
458902	2011 UA_{204}	—	September 24, 2011	Mount Lemmon	Mount Lemmon Survey	·	780 m	MPC · JPL
458903	2011 US_{204}	—	December 20, 2004	Mount Lemmon	Mount Lemmon Survey	·	870 m	MPC · JPL
458904	2011 UP_{205}	—	September 26, 2011	Kitt Peak	Spacewatch	·	980 m	MPC · JPL
458905	2011 UE_{230}	—	September 20, 2011	Kitt Peak	Spacewatch	MAS	670 m	MPC · JPL
458906	2011 UW_{234}	—	May 21, 2006	Kitt Peak	Spacewatch	PHO	890 m	MPC · JPL
458907	2011 UL_{236}	—	November 29, 1997	Kitt Peak	Spacewatch	·	650 m	MPC · JPL
458908	2011 UF_{239}	—	October 7, 2004	Kitt Peak	Spacewatch	·	580 m	MPC · JPL
458909	2011 UY_{239}	—	November 24, 2000	Kitt Peak	Spacewatch	·	820 m	MPC · JPL
458910	2011 UJ_{240}	—	April 10, 2010	Mount Lemmon	Mount Lemmon Survey	·	790 m	MPC · JPL
458911	2011 UK_{240}	—	October 18, 2011	Kitt Peak	Spacewatch	·	630 m	MPC · JPL
458912	2011 UQ_{240}	—	September 14, 2007	Mount Lemmon	Mount Lemmon Survey	·	930 m	MPC · JPL
458913	2011 UO_{249}	—	September 12, 2007	Kitt Peak	Spacewatch	·	850 m	MPC · JPL
458914	2011 UY_{251}	—	October 5, 2003	Kitt Peak	Spacewatch	·	860 m	MPC · JPL
458915	2011 UH_{252}	—	September 5, 2007	Catalina	CSS	·	1.3 km	MPC · JPL
458916	2011 UO_{267}	—	October 3, 2000	Socorro	LINEAR	·	950 m	MPC · JPL
458917	2011 UV_{274}	—	May 6, 2010	Mount Lemmon	Mount Lemmon Survey	·	570 m	MPC · JPL
458918	2011 UP_{277}	—	October 1, 2011	Mount Lemmon	Mount Lemmon Survey	(2076)	730 m	MPC · JPL
458919	2011 UO_{278}	—	September 10, 2007	Mount Lemmon	Mount Lemmon Survey	NYS	770 m	MPC · JPL
458920	2011 UH_{279}	—	November 4, 2004	Kitt Peak	Spacewatch	·	920 m	MPC · JPL
458921	2011 UL_{279}	—	October 24, 2011	Kitt Peak	Spacewatch	V	590 m	MPC · JPL
458922	2011 UQ_{280}	—	November 20, 2004	Kitt Peak	Spacewatch	·	850 m	MPC · JPL
458923	2011 UD_{281}	—	September 21, 2011	Catalina	CSS	·	920 m	MPC · JPL
458924	2011 UD_{282}	—	September 13, 2007	Mount Lemmon	Mount Lemmon Survey	·	900 m	MPC · JPL
458925	2011 UC_{283}	—	October 28, 2011	Kitt Peak	Spacewatch	·	1.1 km	MPC · JPL
458926	2011 UE_{283}	—	October 11, 1996	Kitt Peak	Spacewatch	·	1.3 km	MPC · JPL
458927	2011 UO_{283}	—	April 24, 2009	Mount Lemmon	Mount Lemmon Survey	·	1.1 km	MPC · JPL
458928	2011 UF_{284}	—	October 1, 2011	Mount Lemmon	Mount Lemmon Survey	·	680 m	MPC · JPL
458929	2011 UM_{295}	—	October 1, 2011	Kitt Peak	Spacewatch	V	540 m	MPC · JPL
458930	2011 UW_{296}	—	October 15, 2004	Mount Lemmon	Mount Lemmon Survey	·	750 m	MPC · JPL
458931	2011 UE_{299}	—	October 19, 2011	Mount Lemmon	Mount Lemmon Survey	·	910 m	MPC · JPL
458932	2011 UV_{301}	—	October 18, 2011	Kitt Peak	Spacewatch	·	970 m	MPC · JPL
458933	2011 US_{313}	—	October 30, 2011	Kitt Peak	Spacewatch	·	680 m	MPC · JPL
458934	2011 UJ_{316}	—	December 16, 2004	Kitt Peak	Spacewatch	MAS	610 m	MPC · JPL
458935	2011 UX_{318}	—	December 9, 2004	Kitt Peak	Spacewatch	·	830 m	MPC · JPL
458936	2011 UW_{321}	—	January 29, 2009	Mount Lemmon	Mount Lemmon Survey	·	830 m	MPC · JPL
458937	2011 UK_{323}	—	October 23, 2004	Kitt Peak	Spacewatch	·	750 m	MPC · JPL
458938	2011 UG_{324}	—	November 11, 2004	Kitt Peak	Spacewatch	·	690 m	MPC · JPL
458939	2011 UO_{333}	—	October 1, 2008	Kitt Peak	Spacewatch	·	1.2 km	MPC · JPL
458940	2011 UZ_{334}	—	September 21, 2011	Mount Lemmon	Mount Lemmon Survey	·	1.0 km	MPC · JPL
458941	2011 UX_{336}	—	November 19, 2001	Anderson Mesa	LONEOS	·	670 m	MPC · JPL
458942	2011 UC_{337}	—	December 30, 2008	Kitt Peak	Spacewatch	·	1.2 km	MPC · JPL
458943	2011 UR_{337}	—	December 29, 2008	Mount Lemmon	Mount Lemmon Survey	·	680 m	MPC · JPL
458944	2011 UW_{337}	—	October 24, 2007	Mount Lemmon	Mount Lemmon Survey	·	980 m	MPC · JPL
458945	2011 UR_{340}	—	October 19, 2000	Kitt Peak	Spacewatch	·	950 m	MPC · JPL
458946	2011 UC_{341}	—	September 8, 2000	Kitt Peak	Spacewatch	·	790 m	MPC · JPL
458947	2011 UG_{344}	—	March 2, 2006	Kitt Peak	Spacewatch	·	1.0 km	MPC · JPL
458948	2011 UJ_{352}	—	October 20, 2011	Kitt Peak	Spacewatch	·	1.1 km	MPC · JPL
458949	2011 UB_{369}	—	September 27, 2011	Mount Lemmon	Mount Lemmon Survey	·	940 m	MPC · JPL
458950	2011 UH_{377}	—	November 5, 2004	Kitt Peak	Spacewatch	·	590 m	MPC · JPL
458951	2011 UH_{379}	—	October 15, 2007	Mount Lemmon	Mount Lemmon Survey	NYS	870 m	MPC · JPL
458952	2011 US_{379}	—	September 30, 2011	Mount Lemmon	Mount Lemmon Survey	EUN	1.1 km	MPC · JPL
458953	2011 UH_{381}	—	April 11, 2010	Mount Lemmon	Mount Lemmon Survey	·	1.0 km	MPC · JPL
458954	2011 UW_{391}	—	December 29, 2008	Mount Lemmon	Mount Lemmon Survey	·	610 m	MPC · JPL
458955	2011 UU_{396}	—	September 28, 2011	Mount Lemmon	Mount Lemmon Survey	NYS	950 m	MPC · JPL
458956	2011 UX_{398}	—	September 10, 2007	Mount Lemmon	Mount Lemmon Survey	PHO	940 m	MPC · JPL
458957	2011 UC_{404}	—	October 31, 2011	Kitt Peak	Spacewatch	·	780 m	MPC · JPL
458958	2011 UY_{404}	—	January 23, 2006	Mount Lemmon	Mount Lemmon Survey	·	890 m	MPC · JPL
458959	2011 UE_{407}	—	December 11, 2004	Kitt Peak	Spacewatch	MAS	620 m	MPC · JPL
458960	2011 VY	—	November 1, 2011	Catalina	CSS	V	760 m	MPC · JPL
458961	2011 VT_{12}	—	October 18, 2011	Kitt Peak	Spacewatch	·	920 m	MPC · JPL
458962	2011 VE_{21}	—	May 7, 2010	Mount Lemmon	Mount Lemmon Survey	·	710 m	MPC · JPL
458963	2011 VN_{22}	—	November 18, 2007	Mount Lemmon	Mount Lemmon Survey	·	790 m	MPC · JPL
458964	2011 WM_{2}	—	November 17, 2011	Catalina	CSS	AMO	320 m	MPC · JPL
458965	2011 WS_{8}	—	January 28, 2006	Kitt Peak	Spacewatch	·	730 m	MPC · JPL
458966	2011 WA_{14}	—	October 7, 2007	Mount Lemmon	Mount Lemmon Survey	MAS	620 m	MPC · JPL
458967	2011 WB_{17}	—	October 23, 2011	Kitt Peak	Spacewatch	·	790 m	MPC · JPL
458968	2011 WK_{17}	—	May 7, 2010	Mount Lemmon	Mount Lemmon Survey	·	1.2 km	MPC · JPL
458969	2011 WR_{18}	—	October 6, 2004	Kitt Peak	Spacewatch	·	730 m	MPC · JPL
458970	2011 WW_{23}	—	April 11, 2010	Mount Lemmon	Mount Lemmon Survey	·	780 m	MPC · JPL
458971	2011 WK_{24}	—	October 16, 2007	Mount Lemmon	Mount Lemmon Survey	·	920 m	MPC · JPL
458972	2011 WZ_{24}	—	October 21, 2007	Mount Lemmon	Mount Lemmon Survey	·	1.7 km	MPC · JPL
458973	2011 WT_{36}	—	October 19, 2000	Kitt Peak	Spacewatch	·	1.0 km	MPC · JPL
458974	2011 WG_{56}	—	April 19, 2009	Mount Lemmon	Mount Lemmon Survey	·	960 m	MPC · JPL
458975	2011 WO_{57}	—	January 15, 2005	Kitt Peak	Spacewatch	MAS	490 m	MPC · JPL
458976	2011 WV_{60}	—	October 9, 2004	Kitt Peak	Spacewatch	·	570 m	MPC · JPL
458977	2011 WE_{62}	—	February 4, 2005	Kitt Peak	Spacewatch	NYS	770 m	MPC · JPL
458978	2011 WV_{63}	—	August 8, 2007	Siding Spring	SSS	·	2.8 km	MPC · JPL
458979	2011 WG_{68}	—	November 26, 2011	Mount Lemmon	Mount Lemmon Survey	·	1.5 km	MPC · JPL
458980	2011 WT_{69}	—	November 9, 2004	Catalina	CSS	·	670 m	MPC · JPL
458981	2011 WJ_{70}	—	December 9, 2004	Kitt Peak	Spacewatch	NYS	920 m	MPC · JPL
458982	2011 WU_{70}	—	September 30, 2007	Kitt Peak	Spacewatch	NYS	960 m	MPC · JPL
458983	2011 WF_{71}	—	October 27, 2011	Mount Lemmon	Mount Lemmon Survey	V	620 m	MPC · JPL
458984	2011 WP_{71}	—	November 3, 2011	Kitt Peak	Spacewatch	PHO	880 m	MPC · JPL
458985	2011 WC_{72}	—	November 1, 2011	Mount Lemmon	Mount Lemmon Survey	·	1.4 km	MPC · JPL
458986	2011 WT_{72}	—	October 27, 2011	Mount Lemmon	Mount Lemmon Survey	·	800 m	MPC · JPL
458987	2011 WZ_{82}	—	October 21, 2011	Mount Lemmon	Mount Lemmon Survey	·	900 m	MPC · JPL
458988	2011 WP_{93}	—	November 3, 2011	Kitt Peak	Spacewatch	·	850 m	MPC · JPL
458989	2011 WP_{105}	—	February 12, 2004	Kitt Peak	Spacewatch	·	1.5 km	MPC · JPL
458990	2011 WR_{112}	—	September 14, 2007	Mount Lemmon	Mount Lemmon Survey	·	1.2 km	MPC · JPL
458991	2011 WZ_{112}	—	January 6, 2005	Catalina	CSS	·	1.3 km	MPC · JPL
458992	2011 WJ_{115}	—	January 16, 2005	Kitt Peak	Spacewatch	·	1.1 km	MPC · JPL
458993	2011 WY_{115}	—	November 19, 2003	Kitt Peak	Spacewatch	·	780 m	MPC · JPL
458994	2011 WV_{126}	—	November 11, 2004	Kitt Peak	Spacewatch	·	490 m	MPC · JPL
458995	2011 WG_{132}	—	March 3, 2009	Mount Lemmon	Mount Lemmon Survey	NYS	700 m	MPC · JPL
458996	2011 WB_{134}	—	September 11, 2007	Kitt Peak	Spacewatch	MAS	550 m	MPC · JPL
458997	2011 WC_{134}	—	November 17, 2011	Mount Lemmon	Mount Lemmon Survey	·	750 m	MPC · JPL
458998	2011 WO_{137}	—	September 12, 2007	Mount Lemmon	Mount Lemmon Survey	MAS	460 m	MPC · JPL
458999	2011 WA_{141}	—	October 8, 2007	Mount Lemmon	Mount Lemmon Survey	·	1.1 km	MPC · JPL
459000	2011 WY_{143}	—	May 13, 2009	Kitt Peak	Spacewatch	·	3.8 km	MPC · JPL

back to top

== Meaning of names ==
As minor planet discoveries are confirmed, they are given a permanent number by the IAU's Minor Planet Center (MPC), and the discoverers can then submit names for them, following the IAU's naming conventions. The list below concerns those minor planets in the specified number-range that have received names, and explains the meanings of those names.

Official naming citations of newly named small Solar System bodies are approved and published in a bulletin by IAU's Working Group for Small Bodies Nomenclature (WGSBN). Before May 2021, citations were published in MPC's Minor Planet Circulars for many decades. Recent citations can also be found on the JPL Small-Body Database (SBDB). Until his death in 2016, German astronomer Lutz D. Schmadel compiled these citations into the Dictionary of Minor Planet Names (DMP) and regularly updated the collection.

Based on Paul Herget's The Names of the Minor Planets, Schmadel also researched the unclear origin of numerous asteroids, most of which had been named prior to World War II. This article incorporates text from this source, which is in the public domain: SBDB New namings may only be added to this list below after official publication as the preannouncement of names is condemned. The WGSBN publishes a comprehensive guideline for the naming rules of non-cometary small Solar System bodies.

Named minor planet	Provisional	This minor planet was named for...	Ref · Catalog
458063 Gustavomuler	2009 YB_{7}	Gustavo Muler (born 1967), an Argentine-born Spanish amateur astronomer and discoverer of minor planets	JPL · 458063
458123 Lydiabeneckee	2010 EW_{82}	Lydia Benecke, German author and criminal psychologist who works as a consultant on subjects such as paraphilias, superstitious beliefs, and subcultures.	IAU · 458123
