= SMJG =

SMJG e.V.
- Established: 29 April 2010
- Type: Charitable Organization
- Purpose: Support of young sexual deviants
- Headquarters: Berlin
- Website: www.smjg.org

SMJG is a charitable organization originating in Germany which provides education in the field of BDSM and sexuality for young adults and teenagers. The association is active in all parts of Europe where German is spoken.

The association was formed by young adults in late 2000. At first they offered information and a communication platform on their online presence. Since 2002, several real-life meet ups are hosted by the group. With several iterating meet ups in a large number of cities, the SMJG is one of the biggest trans-regional charitable organization concerning BDSM in German-speaking European countries.

== History ==
The name is an acronym which consists of “BDSM & JuGend” (The German word for youth and shorthand for youth-organization). The name developed from the original name “Sadomasochistische Jugendgruppe”. The SMJG was founded in August 2000 by a 15-year-old, as a reaction to the lack of information regarding BDSM, especially for young people. In the following years the project SMJG grew to be a charitable organization with a wide reach and is an important part of the German-speaking BDSM subculture. The SMJG offers interested young adults and teenagers contact to persons of their own age and detailed information on the topic of BDSM, creating a safe environment to talk about their sexuality. The goal of the organization is to be a venue for the sexually curious and the prevention of possible accidents during play sessions by setting a focus on education and risk-prevention.

== Work ==
The group organizes regular munches in 37 German and 3 Austrian cities, exclusively for teenagers and young adults. In addition to the monthly meetups, the SMJG also offers a mailing list, an online forum, and a moderated chat. The forum in particular provides a communication network for interested young adults in which they can discuss the subject within the safety of their peer group. Additionally the homepage offers detailed information on potential risks and advice on safety in the context of BDSM and sexuality, as well as help with other youth-specific topics, such as “coming out” and “BDSM and parents”. These services are open to every person of every gender and sexuality, but there is a strict age limit of 27. The SMJG is also present at fairs and street festivals like the “Christopher Street Day” for outreach and the dispelling of misconceptions about the group.

== Controversy ==
In 2012 jugendschutz.net approached SMJG.org with a request to add measures for the protection of minors to the official Forum, threatening to start an inquiry with the Federal Department for Media Harmful to Young Persons. To prevent the unnecessary risk of being added to the index of media harmful to minors, the articles in question were only made available at certain times of the day. Within the German BDSM scene and the SMJG in particular, this was perceived as dangerous, as it restricts access to vital information needed when attempting more difficult types of “play”, potentially threatening minors who can not get this information from anywhere else. This was particularly problematic as the arguments for censoring the site, such as “risking to lead minors into deviant sexualities”, which have since been refuted by several psychologists, among them Lydia Benecke, the Jugendschutzbeauftragte (Commissioner for the protection of minors) of the SMJG.

== Literature ==
- Daniel Erk (17 November 2006), "Der schöne Schmerz" (Online), NEON (in German), vol. December 2006
- aZrael; Tigakatze; Ratti (2010), "10 Jahre SMJG", Schlagzeilen (in German), vol. SZ110, pp. 33–34, archived from the original (Online) on 2015-11-24
- Janoschek, Sabine; Fellner, Karin (2008). "Gefesselt im Netz". Vienna: University of Vienna.
- "SM International". Journal of Homosexuality. 50 (2–3): 263–280. 2006-05-02. doi:10.1300/J082v50n02_13. ISSN 0091-8369. PMID 16871676. S2CID 41195773.
