= Lydia Benecke =

German criminal psychologist (born 1982)

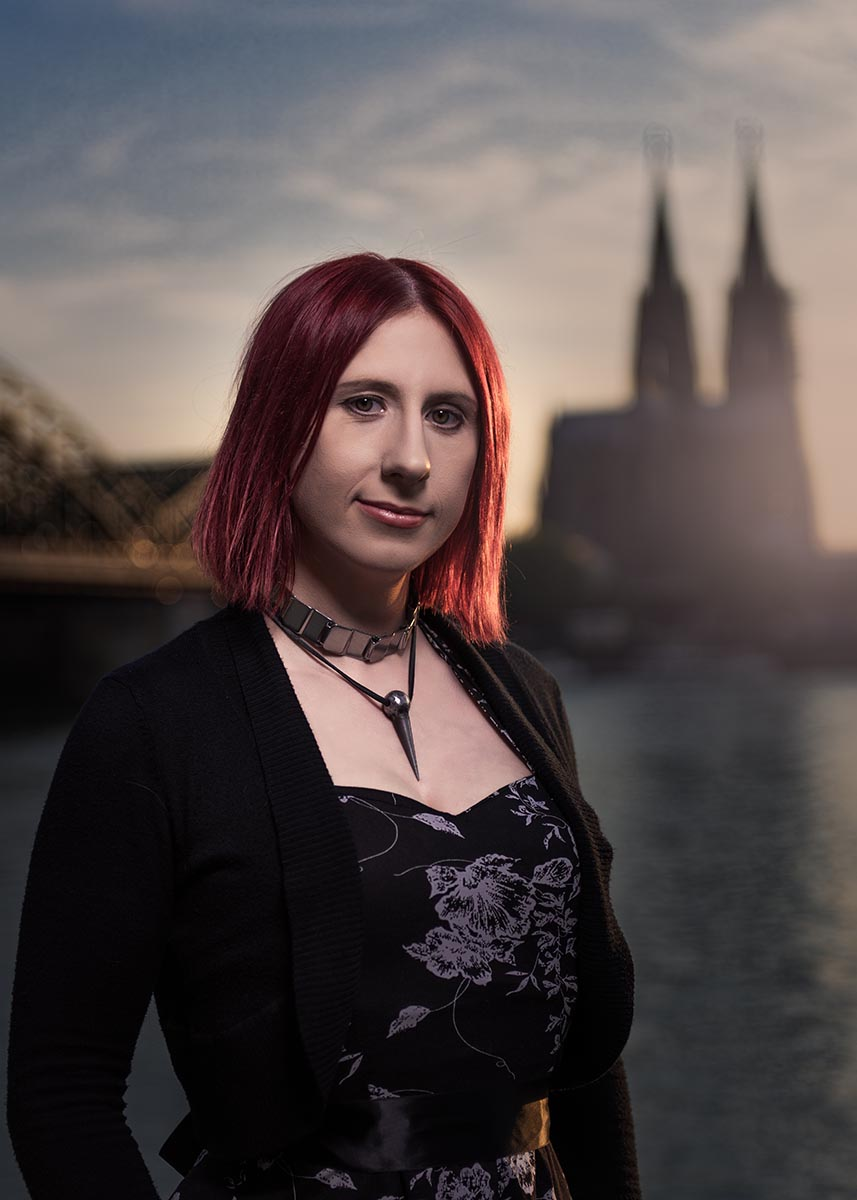
- Benecke in 2015
- Born: Ewelin Wawrzyniak; 1982 (age 43–44); Bytom, Poland
- Citizenship: German
- Education: Psychology
- Occupations: Criminal psychologist and writer
- Writing career
- Genre: Popular science non-fiction.

Lydia Benecke (born in 1982 as Ewelin C. Wawrzyniak) is a German criminal psychologist and writer of popular science non-fiction.

== Early life and education ==
Benecke was born in Bytom, Poland and left for Germany at the age of 4 with her mother. She grew up in Bottrop and developed her interest in criminal cases from a young age. After finishing school at the Janusz-Korczak-Gesamtschule in Bottrop, she studied psychology, psychopathology and forensic science at the Ruhr University Bochum.

== Career ==
=== Psychologist ===
Since 2008 she has been working therapeutically in a social therapy institution with sexual and violent offenders.

Between 2009 and 2013 she worked as a psychological consultant in criminal cases and in public relations for her then husband's company, the criminal biologist Mark Benecke. Nowadays, she works as an independent criminal psychologist with an office in Cologne in the fields of consulting and education. Her main areas of work are paraphilias, personality disorders (including psychopathy, antisocial personality disorders, and borderline personality disorders), psychological trauma, superstitious beliefs, and subcultures (including BDSM scene, dark culture, Goth subculture, sects, and vampire subculture).

=== Author ===
After completing her studies in psychology, she co-authored several of Mark Benecke's books between 2009 and 2011, of which she also edited The Benecke Universe.

Mark Benecke commissioned her to write Aus der Dunkelkammer des Bösen to create a comprehensive psychological profile for the Colombian serial killer Luis Alfredo Garavito Cubillos. The book was published 2011, and achieved high rankings on the Spiegel bestseller list. She has been a regular columnist for the German-language BDSM magazine Schlagzeilen since 2010.

In her column "Psychokiste", she deals with various questions on the subject of BDSM from a psychological point of view.

In 2013, she published a psychological profile of the historical serial killer and cannibal Karl Denke.

Published in October 2013, her book Auf dünnem Eis. Die Psychologie des Bösen analyzed the crimes of Rodney Alcala, Richard Kuklinski, Leopold and Loeb, and the murder of Marta Russo. Using the test methods developed by Robert D. Hare, the book also discussed what created psychopaths. It entered the Spiegel bestseller list at number 13 in November 2013.

Her next book, Sadisten.Tödliche Liebe – Geschichten aus dem wahren Leben was published on 12 February 2015. It focused on sadism and detailed the sadistic crimes of Harry Kendall Thaw, David Parker Ray, John Wayne Gacy, Karol Kot, and the kidnapping of Colleen Stan, among other incidents. It also achieved a place in the bestseller lists.

Her 2018 book Psychopathinnen. Die Psychologie des weiblichen Bösen centered on female psychopathy, examining the cases of Marybeth Tinning, Aileen Wuornos, Diane Downs, and the murder of Sylvia Likens. The book was also a bestseller.

== Volunteer activities ==
Lydia Benecke has been a member of the Gesellschaft zur wissenschaftlichen Untersuchung von Parawissenschaften (English: Society for the Scientific Investigation of Pseudosciences, GWUP) since her time as a student. In this context, she deals with the psychological examination of the vampire motif, the vampire subculture, superstition and homeopathy. In 2012, after writing a psychological statement on the indexing of a BDSM forum by the youth protection, she became the youth protection commissioner of the German BDSM youth organisation SMJG. She is part of an international Working Group on Human Asphyxia set up by the Canadian forensic scientist Anny Sauvageau. She participated in the evaluation of a series of video recordings recording fatal autoerotic accidents and suicides.

She was involved in suicide and depression prevention, working for the non-profit association Freunde fürs Leben e. V.

== Media ==
Since 2009 she has appeared as a psychological expert in various television programmes, including TV total, stern TV, Explosiv - Das Magazin, Markus Lanz, Bambule, Inka!, Sat.1 breakfast television, the special programme XY - gelöst and the ZDF documentary Dracula lebt!

She also works as an expert for radio, podcast productions, print media and electronic magazines. She has spoken from a psychological point of view on topics such as psychopathy, the Zodiac killer, sexually motivated homicides, Letter bomb assassins, the 2011 Norway attacks, vampires, BDSM, sadomasochism in Germany, skepticism, criminal psychology, doomsday myths and end-time sects.

In 2013 she was in Sat.1-Production "Stalker – Caught in the act" as psychologist responsible for the assessment of the perpetrators. She also explains criminal cases in German TV show Aktenzeichen XY … ungelöst. She also works with Anwälte der Toten and Erbarmungslos", two other TV shows. She also appears in German shows Aktenzeichen XY...ungelöst and Anwälte der Toten as well as Erbarmungslos.

== Publications ==
- Vampire unter uns! Teil 1: Rh. pos. (with Mark Benecke, Kathrin Sonntag, Nastassia Palanetskaya), Edition Roter Drache, Rudolstadt 2009, ISBN 978-3939459248.
- Vampire unter uns! Teil 2: Rh. neg. (with Mark Benecke), Edition Roter Drache, Rudolstadt 2010, ISBN 978-3939459422
- Das Benecke-Universum (with Mark Benecke), Militzke, Leipzig 2011, ISBN 978-3861898450.
- Aus der Dunkelkammer des Bösen. Neue Berichte vom bekanntesten Kriminalbiologen der Welt (with Mark Benecke), Lübbe, Köln 2011, ISBN 978-3785760468, L. Benecke: pp. 60–68/ 71–259 / 292–297 / 327–330 / 357–364 / 388–390.
- Auf dünnem Eis. Die Psychologie des Bösen, Lübbe, Köln 2013, ISBN 978-3785760956; Taschenbuch ebd. 2016, ISBN 978-3404609000.
- Historische Serienmörder III: Karl Denke – Der Kannibale von Münsterberg: Ein deutscher Serienmörder by Armin Rütters, Kirchschlager 2013, L. Benecke: pp. 73–86, ISBN 978-3934277427.
- Sadisten. Tödliche Liebe – Geschichten aus dem wahren Leben. Lübbe, Köln 2015, ISBN 978-3431038996.
- Wie meine Internet-Liebe zum Albtraum wurde: Das Phänomen Realfakes by Victoria Schwartz, Blanvalet 2015, L. Benecke: pp. 256–266, ISBN 978-3764505363.
- Ein multidimensionales psychologisches Modell zur Unterscheidung zwischen inklinierendem und periculärem sexuellen Sadismus, in: Schriftenreihe der Gesellschaft für Kriminologie, Polizei und Recht e.V. : Band 3 / II. Sammelband, Verlag für Polizeiwissenschaft, Frankfurt am Main 2015. L. Benecke: pp. 32–65. ISBN 978-3866764408.
- Die 120 Tage von Sodom 2.0: Neu übersetzt von Curt Moreck, by Marquis de Sade with Frank Schulten, L. Benecke: pp. 6–24), 2016, ISBN 978-3932961724.
- Psychopathinnen. Die Psychologie des weiblichen Bösen. Lübbe, Köln 2018, ISBN 978-3431039962.
- Ein multidimensionales psychologisches Modell zur Unterscheidung zwischen inklinierendem und periculärem sexuellen Sadismus, In: Destruktive Sexualität. Therapie und Risk-Assessment in der Forensischen Psychiatrie. Berlin 2018, L. Benecke: pp. 11– I26, ISBN 978-3954664306.
