= Herbertstraße =

Street in the St. Pauli district of Hamburg, Germany

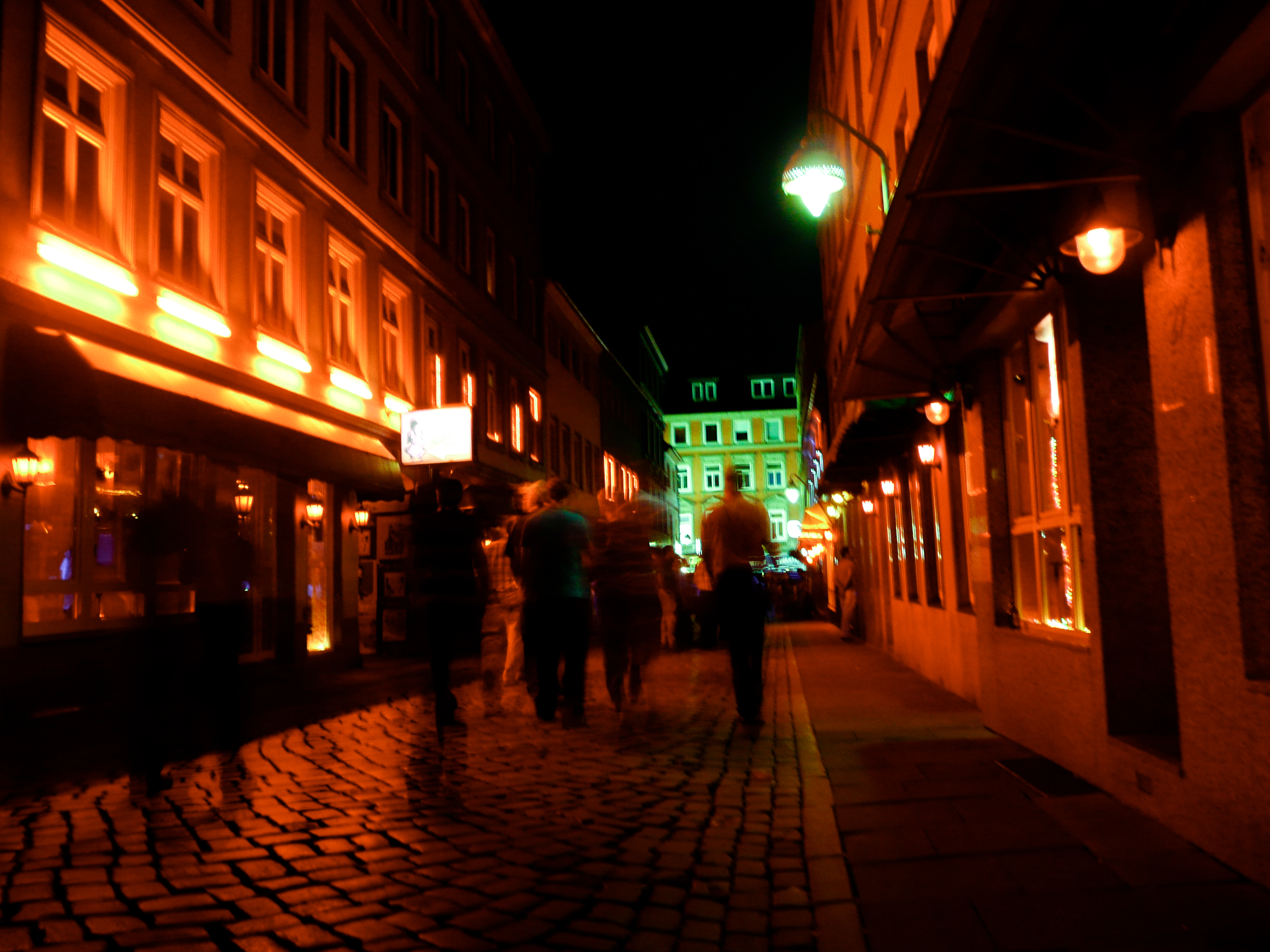
- Former name(s): Heinrichstraße
- Length: 60 m (200 ft)
- Location: St. Pauli, Hamburg, Germany
- Postal code: 20359
- Coordinates: 53°32′52.99″N 9°57′42.78″E

Other
- Known for: Prostitution

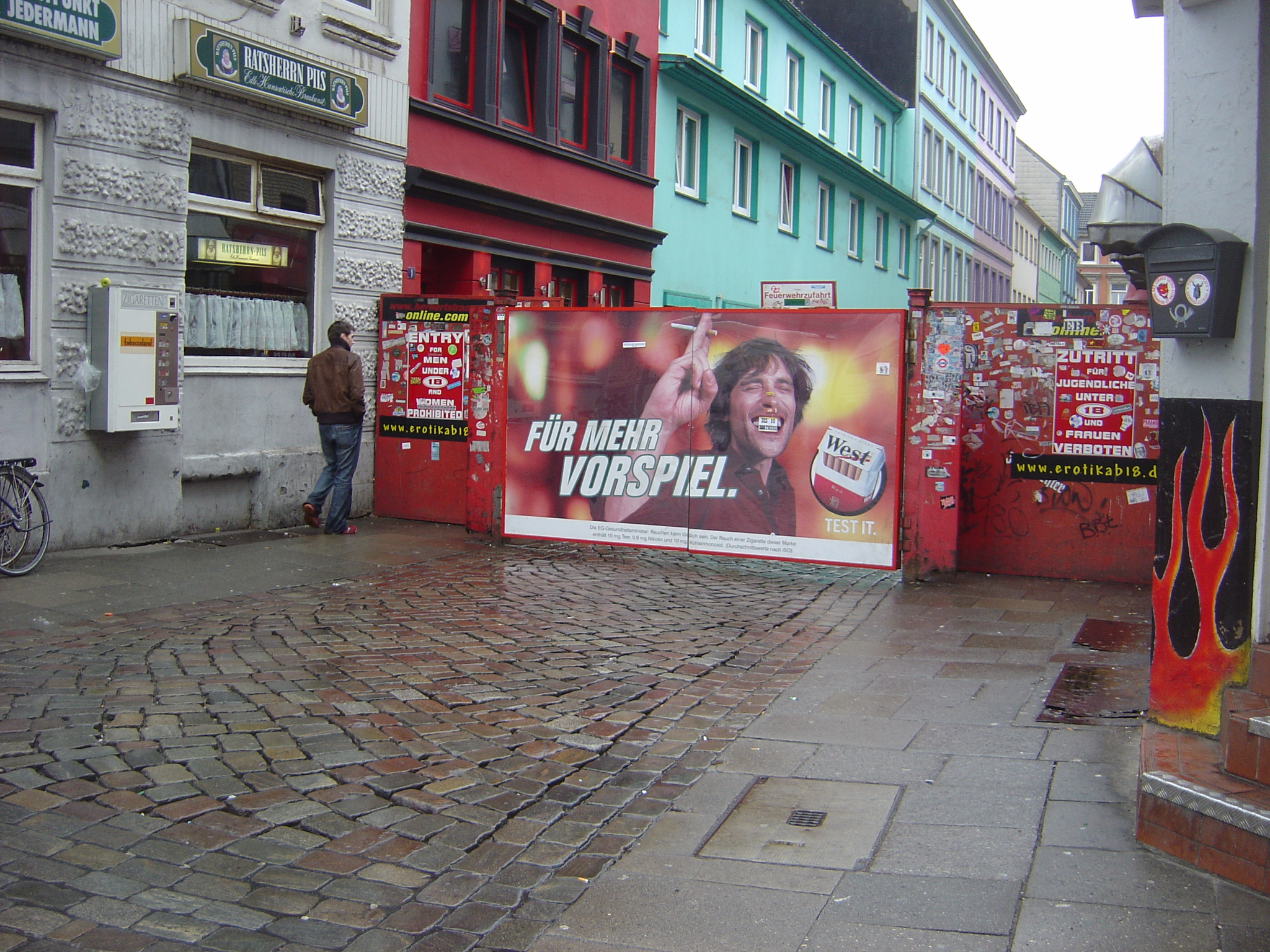
Entrance to Herbertstraße; red sign to the right of the gate reads "No entrance for juveniles under 18 years of age and women". The large cigarette ad reads literally, "...For more foreplay."

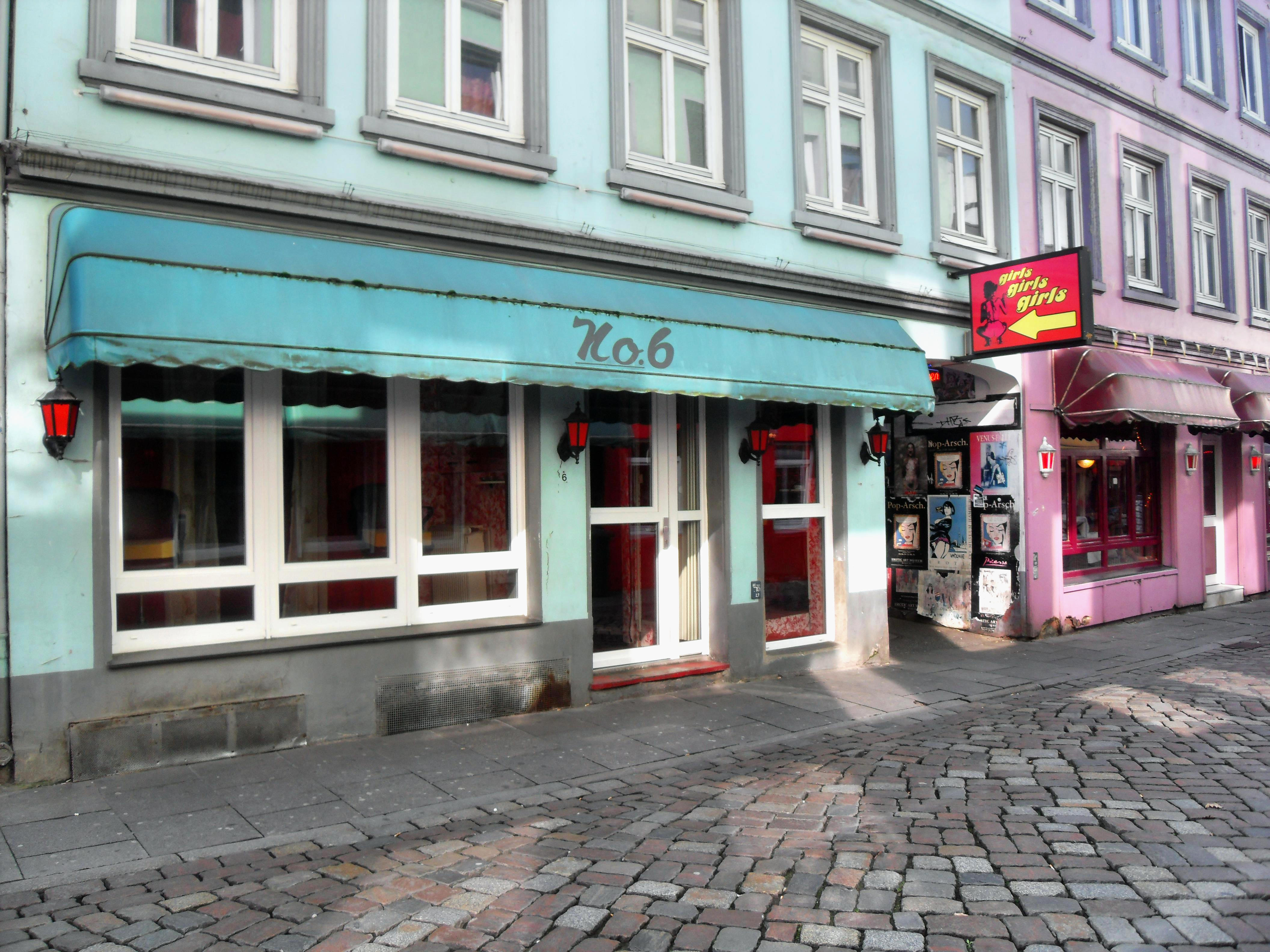
Herbertstraße buildings

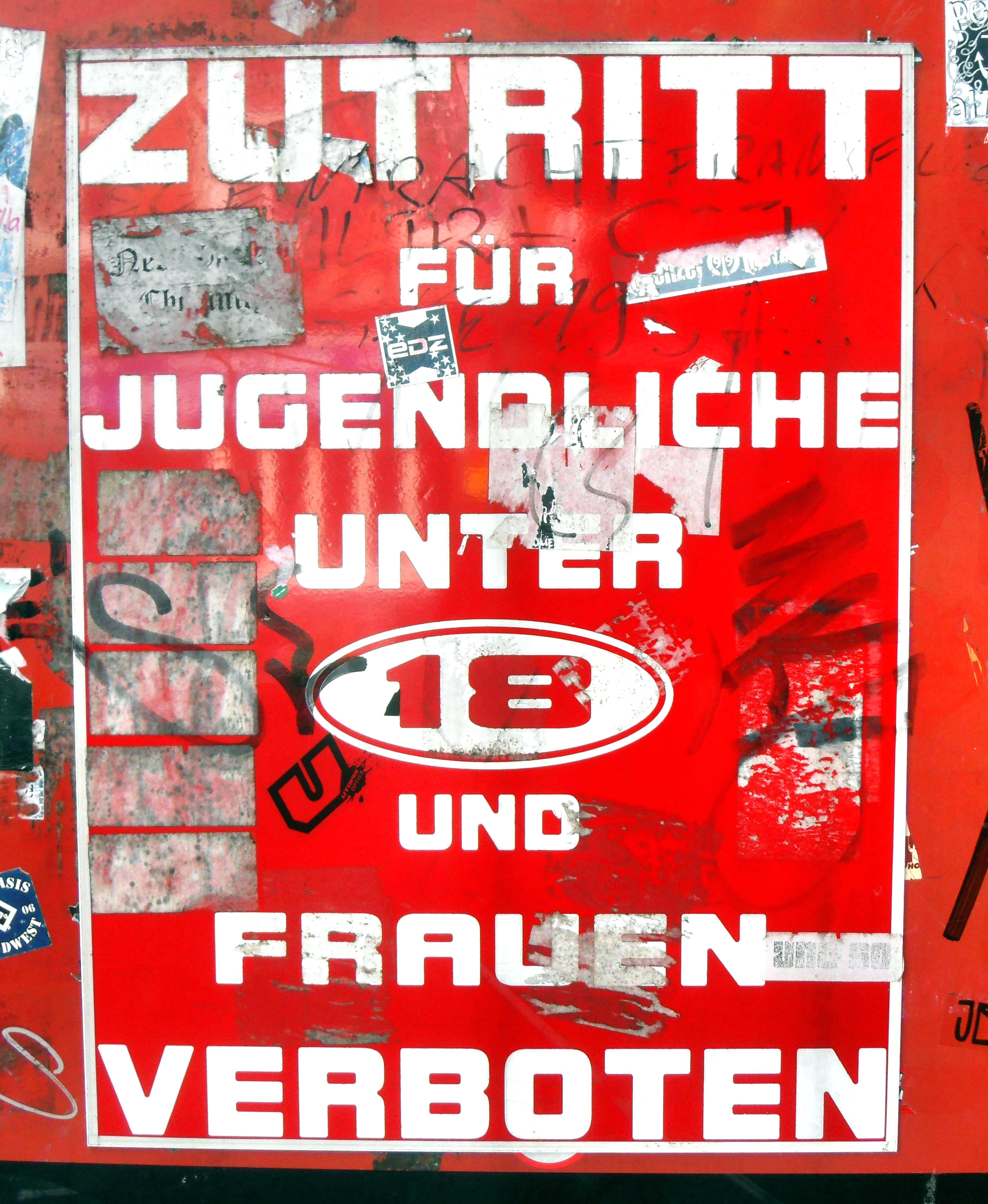
Herbertstraße: signs at the entry to the street that forbid entry to women and minors

Herbertstraße (until 1922 Heinrichstraße) is a street in the St. Pauli district of Hamburg, located near the Reeperbahn, which is the main red-light district. It is the only street in the city where it is still possible to find prostitutes in windows as in the famous De Wallen district of Amsterdam. It is reputed to have Hamburg's most expensive prostitutes. At its peak about 250 women worked there.

== Background ==
The street is located near the Hans-Albers-Platz (the south square of the Reeperbahn dedicated to Hans Albers) and the Spielbudenplatz. Herbertstraße is not named after a person, but is part of a system of streets in the area named alphabetically after male given names (such as Davidstraße, Erichstraße, Friedrichstraße, Gerhardstraße etc.). Originally the street was called "Heinrichstraße".

This custom dates back to the reconstruction of the neighborhood after the fire of 1814 which was deliberately started by occupying French troops as a defensive measure.

The prostitutes (nicknamed for their clothing Stiefelfrauen, or "women with boots") sit on stools in the windows, usually scantily dressed, to try to entice prospective clients to enter. They will sometimes talk to potential clients through an open window. Often the windows have red lighting and neon signs.

== History ==
After the area was rebuilt in the 19th century, it became an area where sailors from the nearby Elbe docks spent their wages in the pubs and strip bars of the neighborhood. Licenses for prostitution were issued.

Prostitution increased in street after many of the brothels in the neighboring Davidstraße and other streets of St. Pauli lost their licenses. These brothels relocated to Herbertstraße.

At the time of Nazi Germany, there was a ban on striptease and prostitution from 1933. However, as a ban on the typical St. Pauli trade could not be consistently enforced, these activities were tolerated only in an alley—Herbertstrasse. In order that no one could see in advance what was really not to be allowed, barriers were erected at both ends of the street.

In the 1970s, police added barriers and signs advising youths and women against entering: the former for reasons of protection against harmful influences, the latter because prostitutes would actively seek to chase away any women who entered, thus causing trouble. The signs are written in both English and German. Zutritt für Männer unter 18 und Frauen verboten in German and Entry for men under 18 and women prohibited in English.

=== 21st century ===
In September 2005, the Energy Hamburg radio station was fined €10,000 for having made a Live Morning aus der Herbertstraße in March, the content of which was criticized for inappropriate sexual practices and offers of prostitution. During the show there were several interviews between two journalists and two prostitutes in Herbertstraße, the prostitutes reporting in detail their practices.

In December 2015, Hamburg police handed out flyers at the entrances to Herbertstraße warning male visitors of the prostitutes' tricks including charging excessive amounts for supposed sexual services.

On 8 March 2019, International Women's Day, members of the feminist activist group FEMEN removed the metal gates keeping Herbertstraße out of public view. The group said that the protest was against the sexual exploitation of women, trafficking and sexual violence, and the fact that the street is inaccessible to women.

== In popular culture ==
- The 1963 film Women of the World contains a segment about Herbertstraße.
- St. Pauli Herbertstraße is a 1965 West German film about a farm girl who ends up working in Herbertstraße.
- In 1967, Herbertstraße prostitutes were employed in a film directed by Jürgen Roland, entitled Polizeirevier Davidswache. The film was partially shot in the street.

== See also ==
- Davidwache
- Hafenstraße
