= Große Freiheit =

Street in Hamburg, Germany

Coordinates: 53°33′2.0″N 9°57′27.0″E

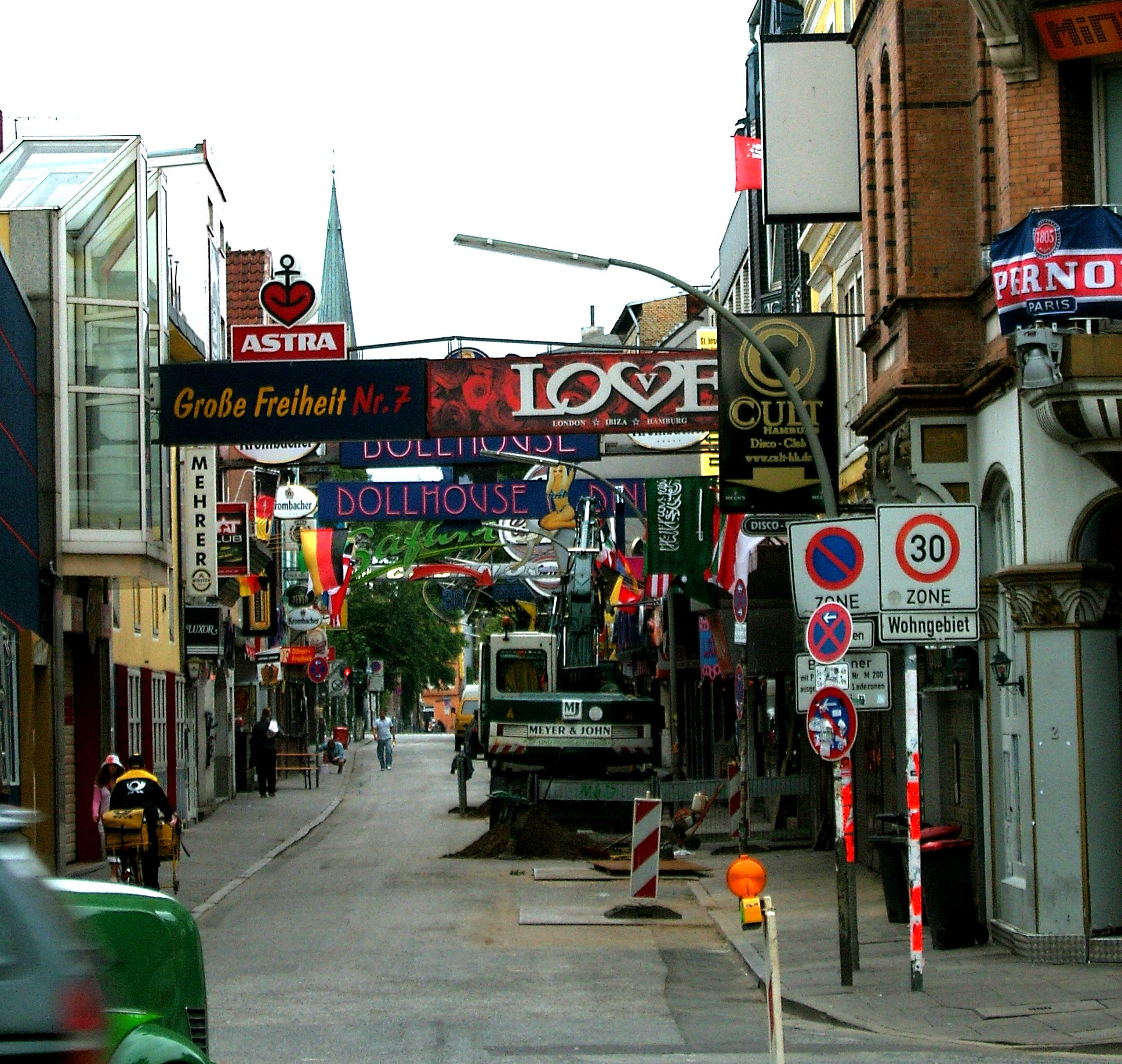
"Entry“ to Große Freiheit as seen from Reeperbahn

The Große Freiheit (German for "Great Freedom") is a street starting on the North Side to Hamburg's Reeperbahn road in the St. Pauli quarter. It is part of the red-light district.

== History ==
The street was named in 1610 after the fact that Count Ernest of Schaumburg and Holstein-Pinneberg had granted religious freedom to non-Lutherans such as Mennonites and Roman Catholics to practise their faith here and commercial freedom for handcrafters not enrolled in the else compelling guilds. At that time this district was part of the city of Altona within the county of Holstein-Pinneberg, and did not yet belong to Hamburg. When the Duchy of Holstein-Glückstadt annexed Holstein-Pinneberg in 1640 the comital freedoms were confirmed. Non-Lutherans were forbidden to publicly practise their religions in Lutheran Hamburg proper. The street has still a Catholic church (St. Joseph), situated among rather unholy businesses. The Mennonite church, established in 1611, moved into another neighbourhood in 1915.

In 1938, when the Nazis changed borders with the Greater Hamburg Act, the street became part of Hamburg. In 1944, the German movie Große Freiheit Nr. 7 with Hans Albers was named after the road.

In the 1960s, The Beatles performed at clubs in the street, e.g. in Große Freiheit 36 (Kaiserkeller), Große Freiheit 64 (today Indra-Musikclub), and in Große Freiheit 39 (the Star-Club, 1962–1969). The street still hosts music clubs like Große Freiheit 36 and Grünspan.

In the 1970s, several sex theatres (Salambo, Regina, Colibri, Safari) showed live sex acts on stage. As of 2007, until its closure in 2013, the Safari was the only live sex theatre left in Germany. The popular table dance club Dollhouse now takes the place of the Salambo.

In 1975, the German rock band Randy Pie used two views of Grosse Freiheit for their album Kitsch: the front cover is a picture of the street at night, while the back cover is the same view but at day time.

In 2008, the Beatles-Platz square was built. In the same year, Hamburg's oldest brothel, the Hotel Luxor, which had operated on the street for 60 years, closed.

There is only one hotel on the street, the St. Joseph Hotel Hamburg, which opened 2005 and named after the church of the same name, St. Joseph.

== Sights ==
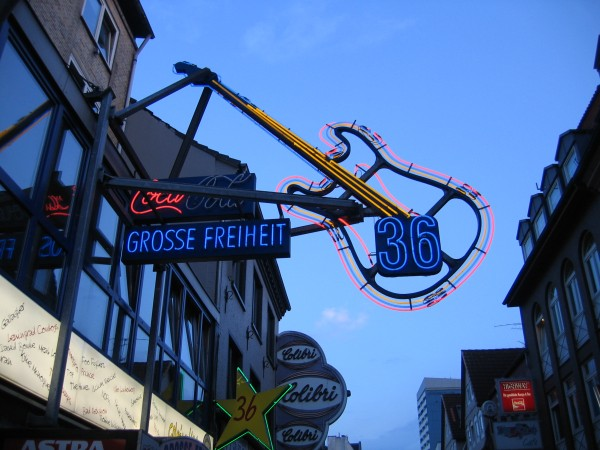
Music club "Große Freiheit 36"

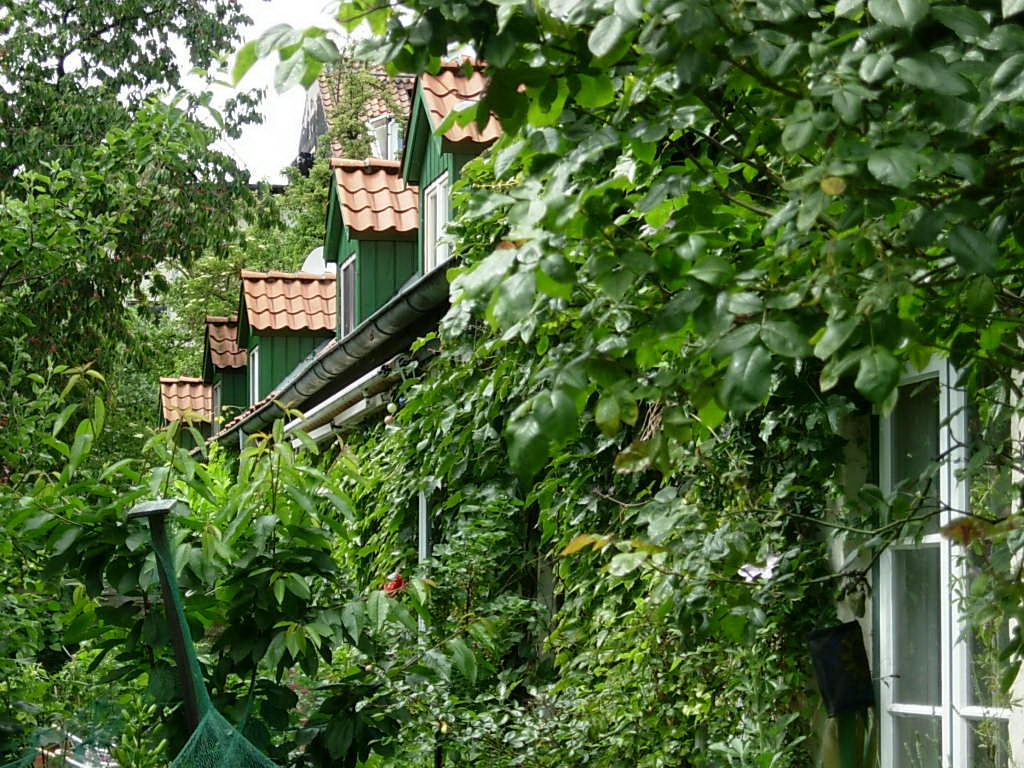
Houses at the "Grenzgang" of Altona, between Große Freiheit and Talstraße

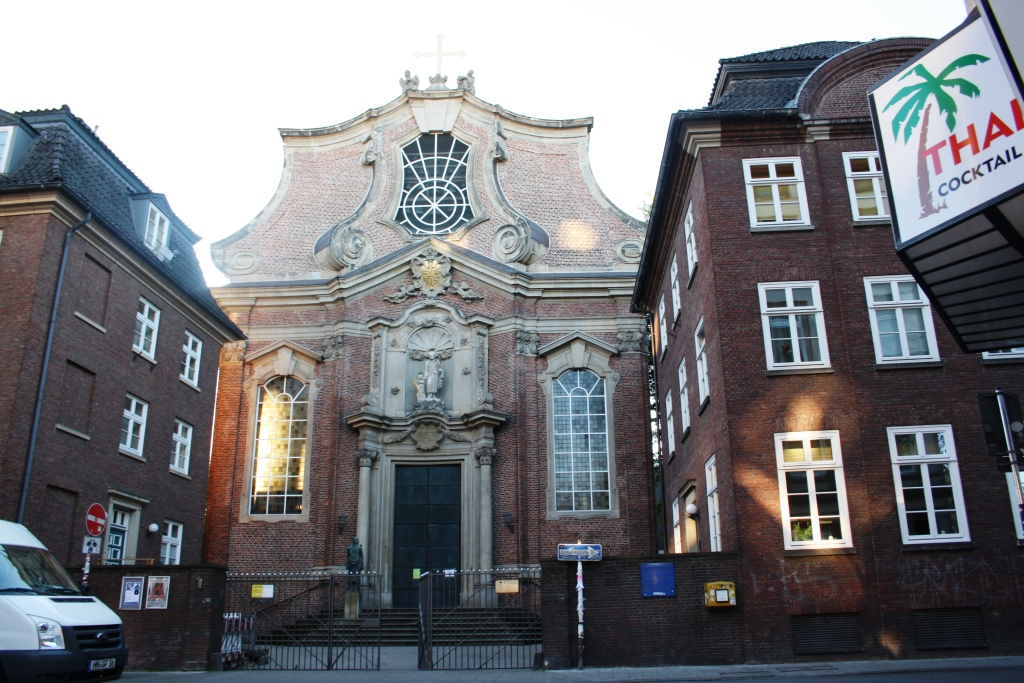
St. Joseph Church on Große Freiheit

== In popular culture ==
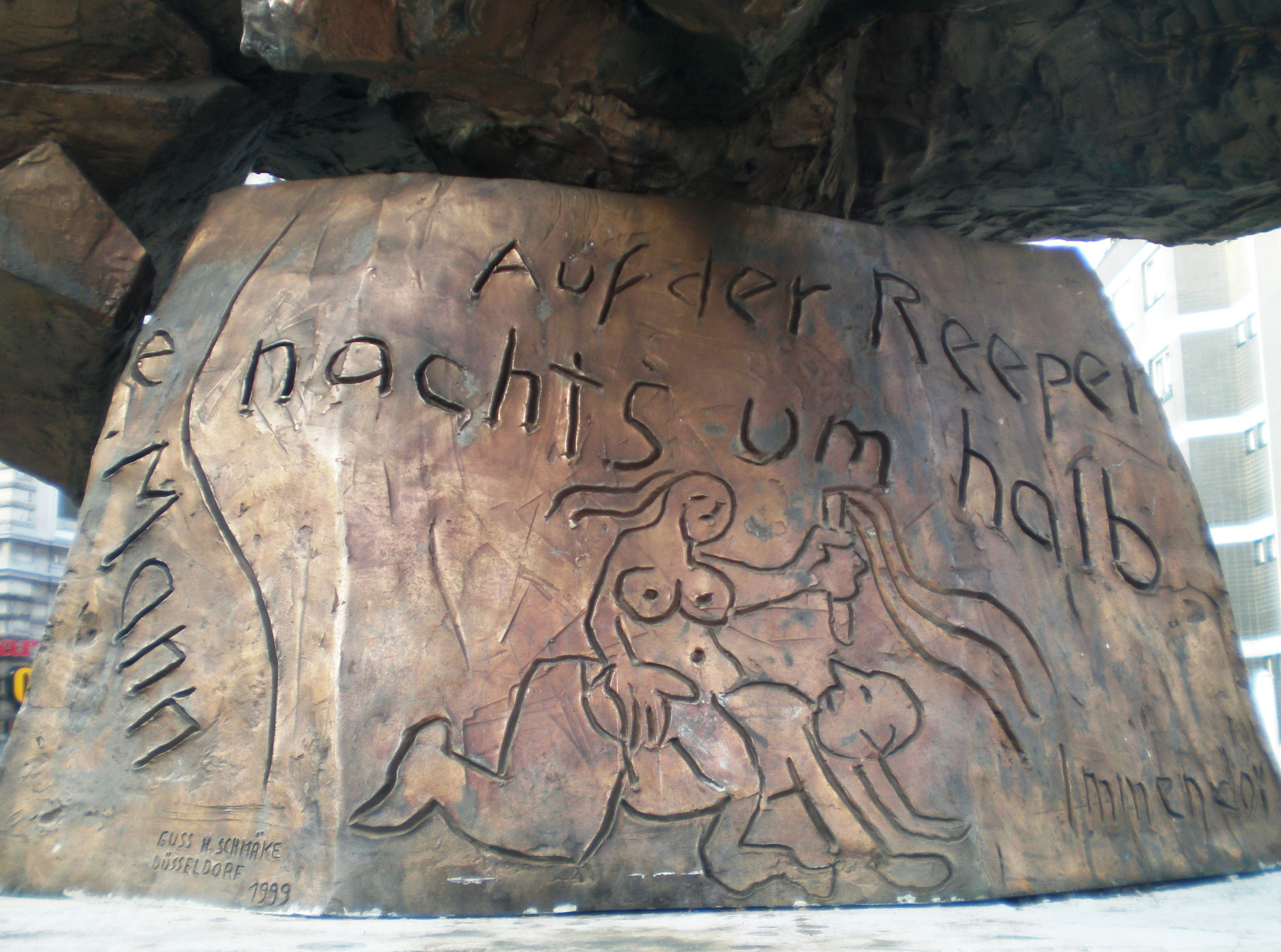
Socle of Hans Albers statue at the Hans-Albers-Platz, by Jörg Immendorff, 1986 — Auf der Reeperbahn nachts um halb eins ("On the Reeperbahn at night at half past twelve")

The popular 1944 movie Große Freiheit Nr. 7 tells the story of a singer (played by Hans Albers) who works in a Reeperbahn club and falls in love with a girl played by Ilse Werner.

Kleine Freiheit (international title: A Little Bit of Freedom) is a 2003 film by Kurdish director Yüksel Yavuz about the friendship (and later relationship) between two teenage boys who are illegal immigrants in Germany, is set on the street and the title is a play on words about the street.

== Literature ==
- Uwe Heimowski: Brunos Dankeschön - Geschichten von der Reeperbahn, Neufeld Verlag, Schwarzenfeld 2005, ISBN 3-937896-12-0
