= Gruenspan =

Music club in Hamburg, Germany

Coordinates: 53°33′6.5″N 9°57′29″E

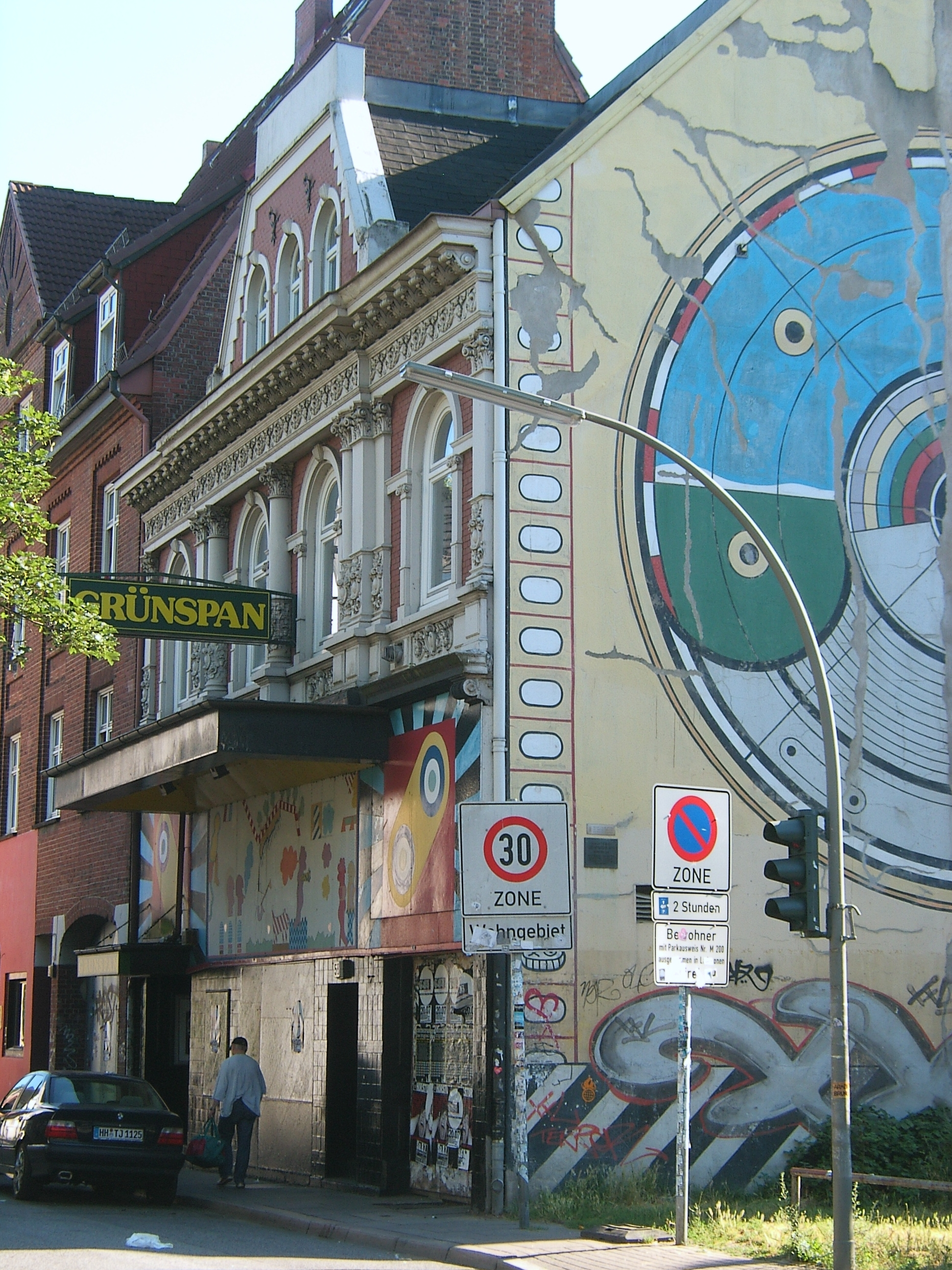
Gruenspan in Hamburg

The Gruenspan (or Grünspan) is a music club in Hamburg, Germany. It was founded in 1968 as a music club and event centre, in a former movie theatre situated in Grosse Freiheit, next to the Reeperbahn. The club became known for concerts and progressive rock.

The building, situated at a corner, seats 800. Its exterior, painted by Hamburg artists Dieter Glasmacher and Werner Nöfer, was restored in 1995 when the building was overhauled.

In November 1998, it hosted a Rockpalast concert with R.E.M.
