= Tizzy =

Tizzy may refer to:

- Elizabeth Lockman, American 21st century politician nicknamed "Tizzy"
- Tanzania "Tizzy" Sebastian, lead vocalist of the Antiguan soca band El-A-Kru

== See also ==
- Jean-Jacques Tizié (born 1972), Ivorian former footballer
- Tissy Bruns (1951–2013), German journalist
- Manfred "Tissy" Thiers, member of the now defunct German rock/funk band Randy Pie
