= Richard Kuöhl =

German sculptor

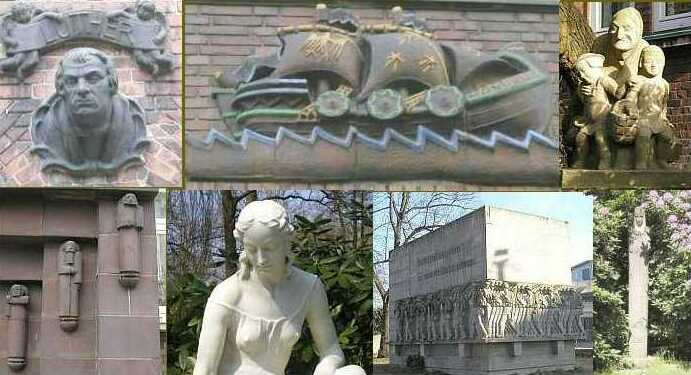
Works by Richard Kuöhl

Richard Kuöhl (May 31, 1880 – May 19, 1961) was a German sculptor, specializing in providing architectural sculpture for the architects of the Brick Expressionism style in northern Germany in the 1920s.

After training in art pottery in his home town of Meissen and studying at the Dresden Arts and Crafts School, Kuöhl moved from Berlin in 1912 following his Dresden architecture professor, Fritz Schumacher, to Hamburg. Schumacher viewed architectural sculpture as particularly important, and so provided his former student with many government commissions.

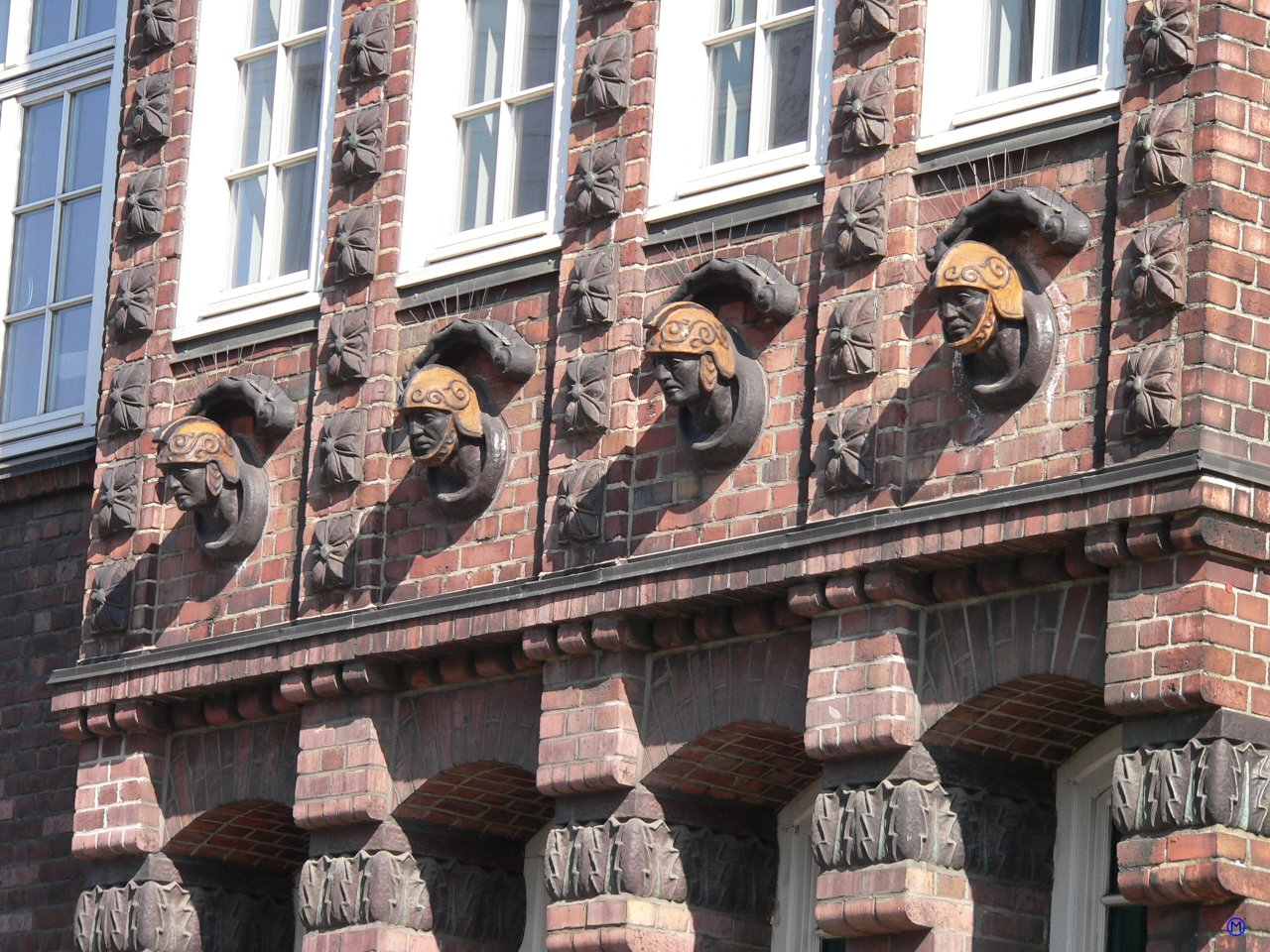
Facade detail of Davidwache, Hamburg

Kuöhl worked prolifically in the 1920s and 1930s in terra cotta, stone, and ceramics, developing a weatherproof Baukeramik. His work is incorporated in many buildings, bridges and monuments in Hamburg and other northern German cities. Kuöhl's Hamburg war memorial, erected to commemorate those of the Second Hanseatic Infantry Regiment number 76 who died in the Franco-Prussian War and the First World War, is typical of the ones erected during the Third Reich and is one of the few remaining. The monument, with its almost mocking inscription, Germany must live, even if we have to die, continues to be swathed in controversy, with much public sentiment favoring removing it while others, particularly veterans groups, demand that it remain.

Major works include the Chilehaus in Hamburg for architect Johann Friedrich Höger, 1922–1924, and the Davidwache police station on the Reeperbahn in Hamburg, for Schumacher.

Upon his death, Kuöhl was buried in Ohlsdorf Cemetery in a tomb that he himself had designed.

War Memorial

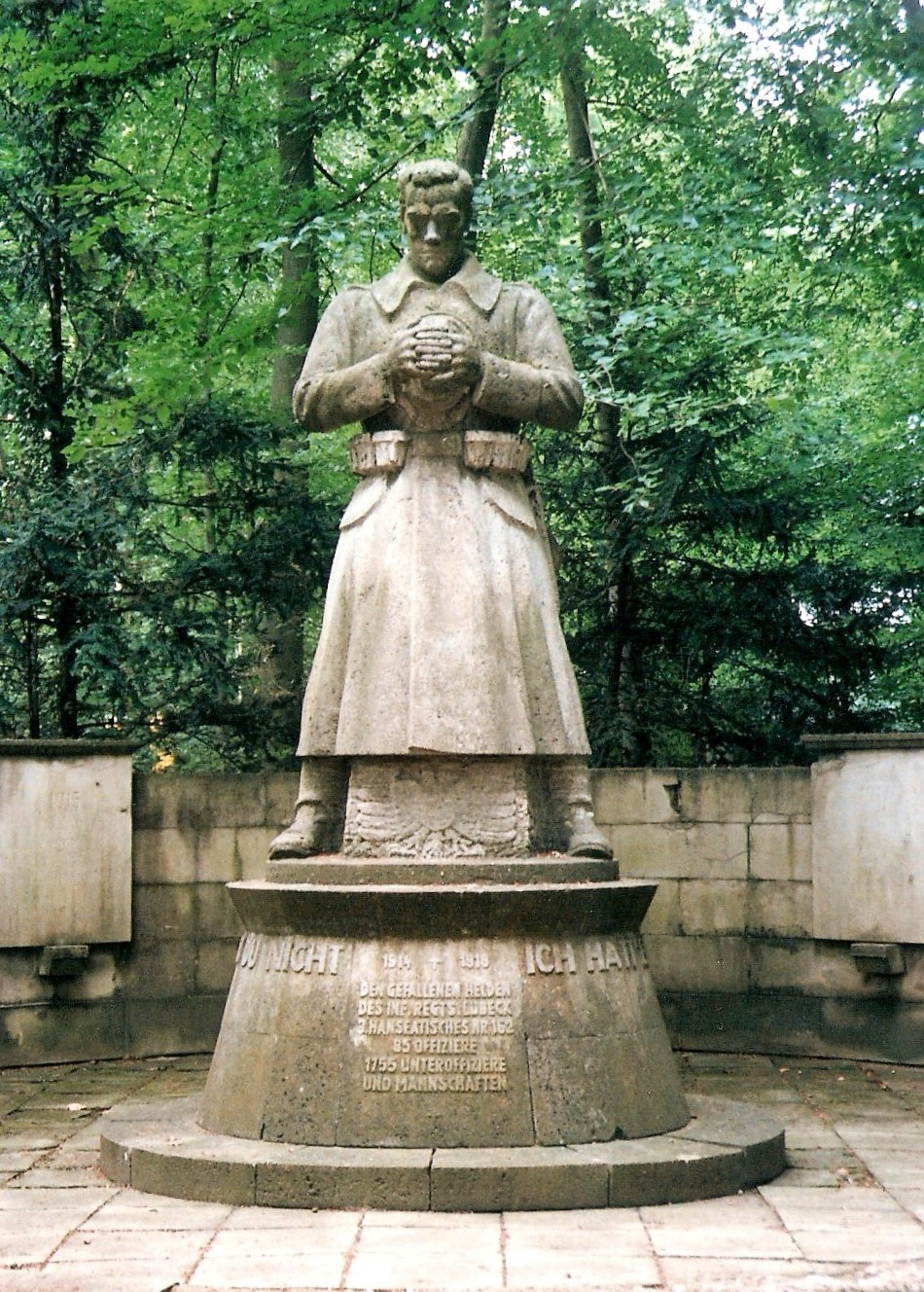
Lübeck, 1923

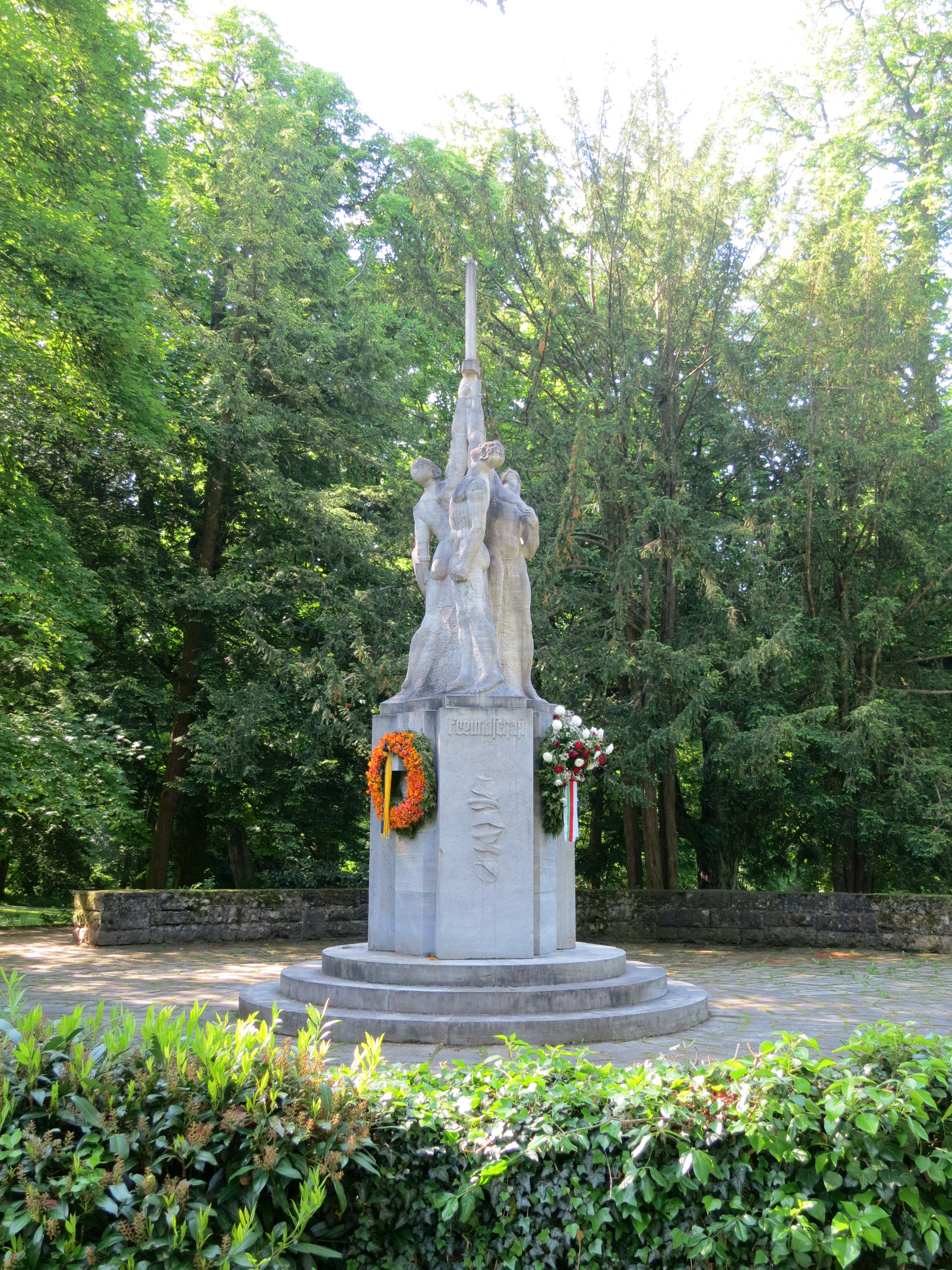
Coburg, 1926

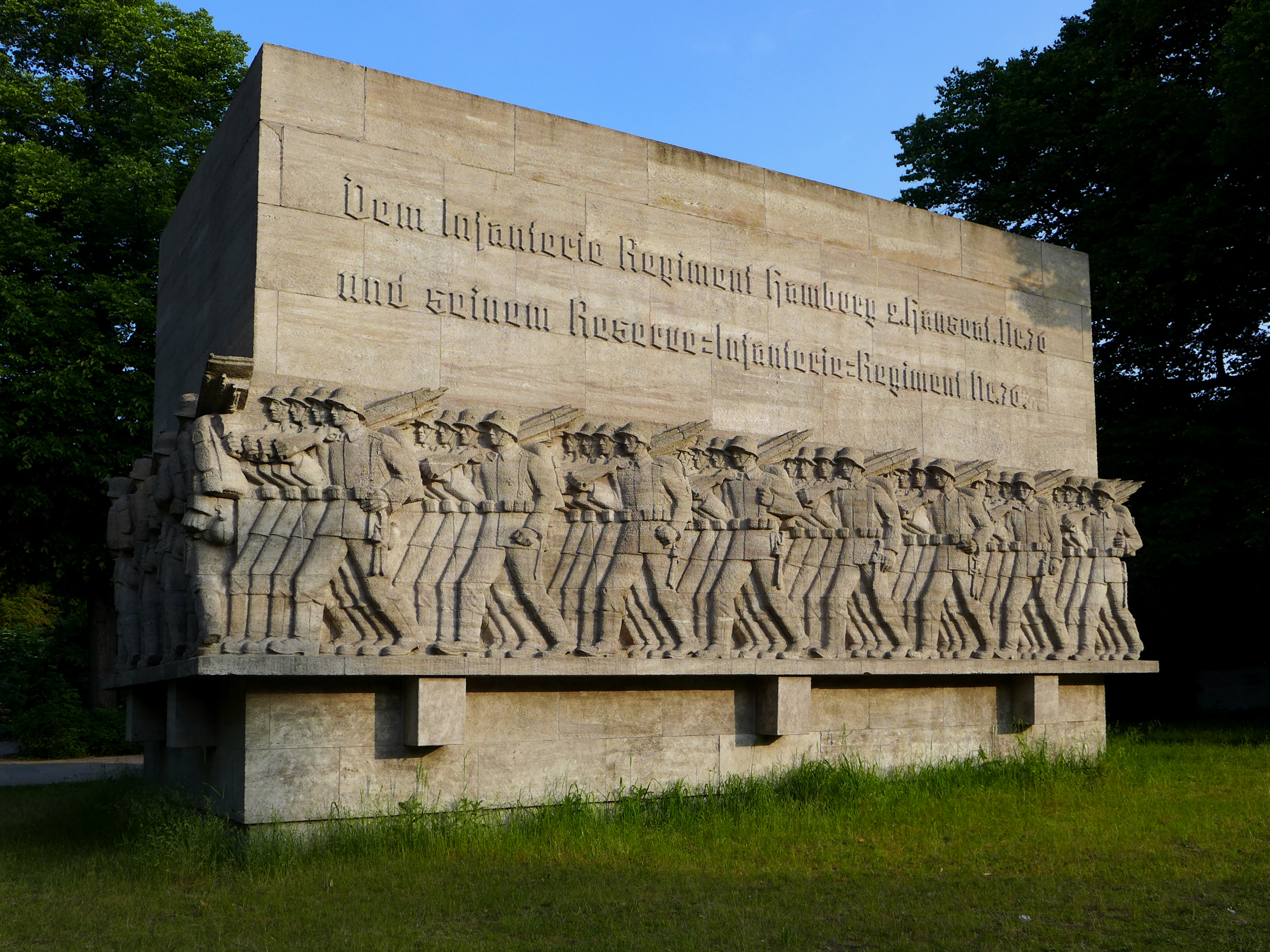
Hamburg, 1936

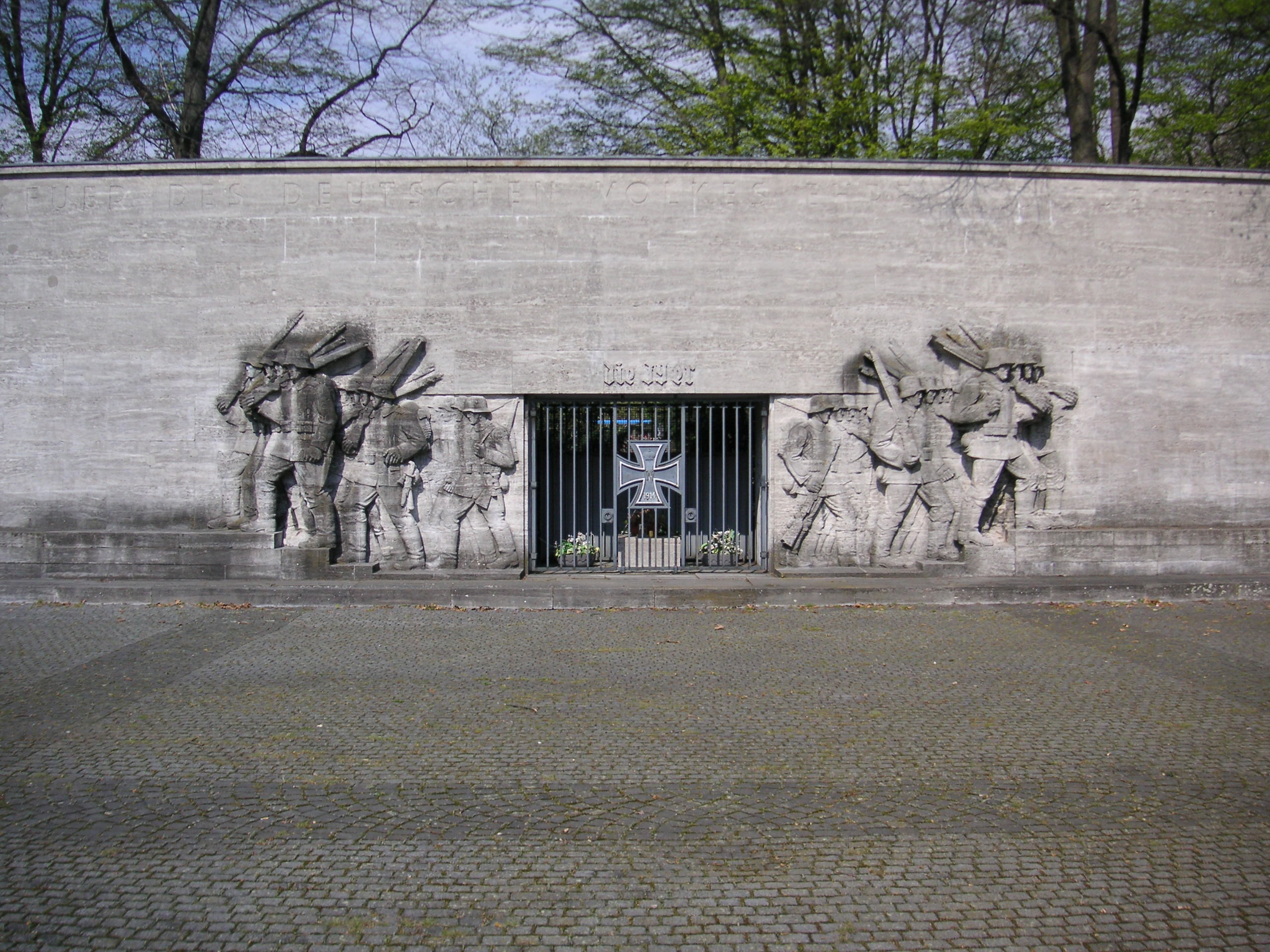
Düsseldorf, 1939
