= Beatles-Platz =

Plaza in the St. Pauli quarter in Hamburg

Coordinates: 53°32′58.9″N 9°57′27.0″E

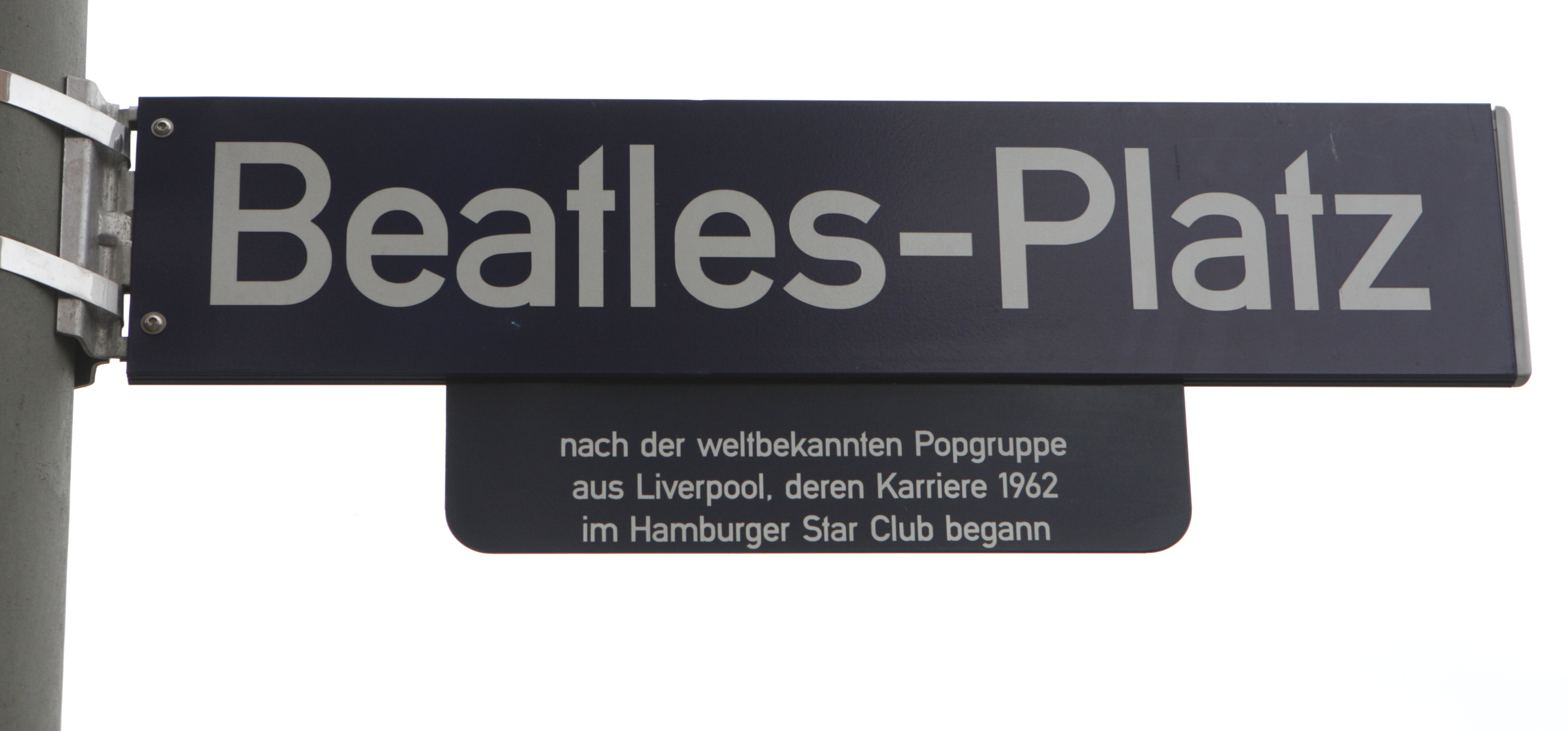
Street sign reading: Beatles square, after the world famous pop band from Liverpool, whose career started in 1962 in Hamburg's Star Club

The Beatles-Platz (English: Beatles Plaza) is in the St. Pauli quarter in Hamburg, Germany, at the crossroads of Reeperbahn and Große Freiheit.

== Overview ==
It is circular, with a diameter of 29 metres (95 ft) and paved black to make it look like a vinyl record. Five statues stand along the perimeter representing the Beatles: John Lennon, Paul McCartney, Stuart Sutcliffe, George Harrison, and a hybrid of drummers Pete Best and Ringo Starr, each of whom played with The Beatles at times during their Hamburg engagements.

Location of Beatles-Platz in Hamburg

This plaza was built to commemorate Hamburg's importance in The Beatles' history. The draft design was by architectural firm Dohse & Stich. Building the project cost about €500,000 and was split among donations, sponsors, and the city of Hamburg.

Construction began with the symbolic groundbreaking on 29 May 2008, which was done by Stephan Heller, Uriz von Oertzen (Hi-Life Entertainment), Frank Otto, Dr. Karin von Welck (minister of culture), Markus Schreiber (head of borough exchange Hamburg-Mitte), and Prof. Jörn Walter (construction supervisor).

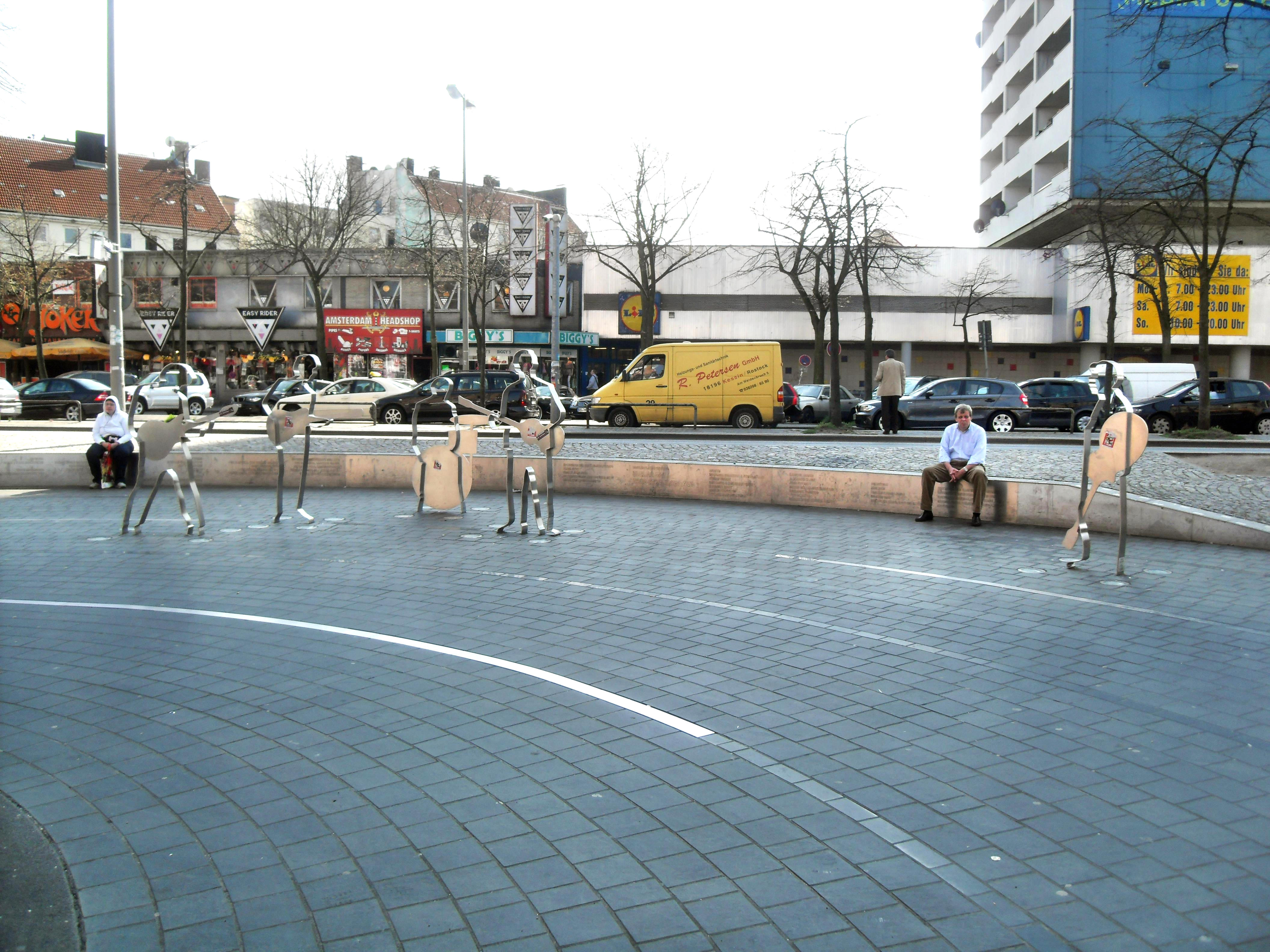
The five figures on Beatles-Platz

Construction continued for approximately three months, and a ceremonial opening took place on 11 September 2008 presided over by the city's First Mayor. The Beatles memorial consists of metal statues of the band members and names of successful songs. The initial engravings held some spelling mistakes such as Drive me car, Sgt. Peppers Lonely Hearts Club Band, and Can't Buy Melove , which could not be corrected before completion. The incorrect plates have since been replaced.
