= Davidwache =

Police station in Hamburg, Germany

Coordinates: 53.5492°N 9.9628°E

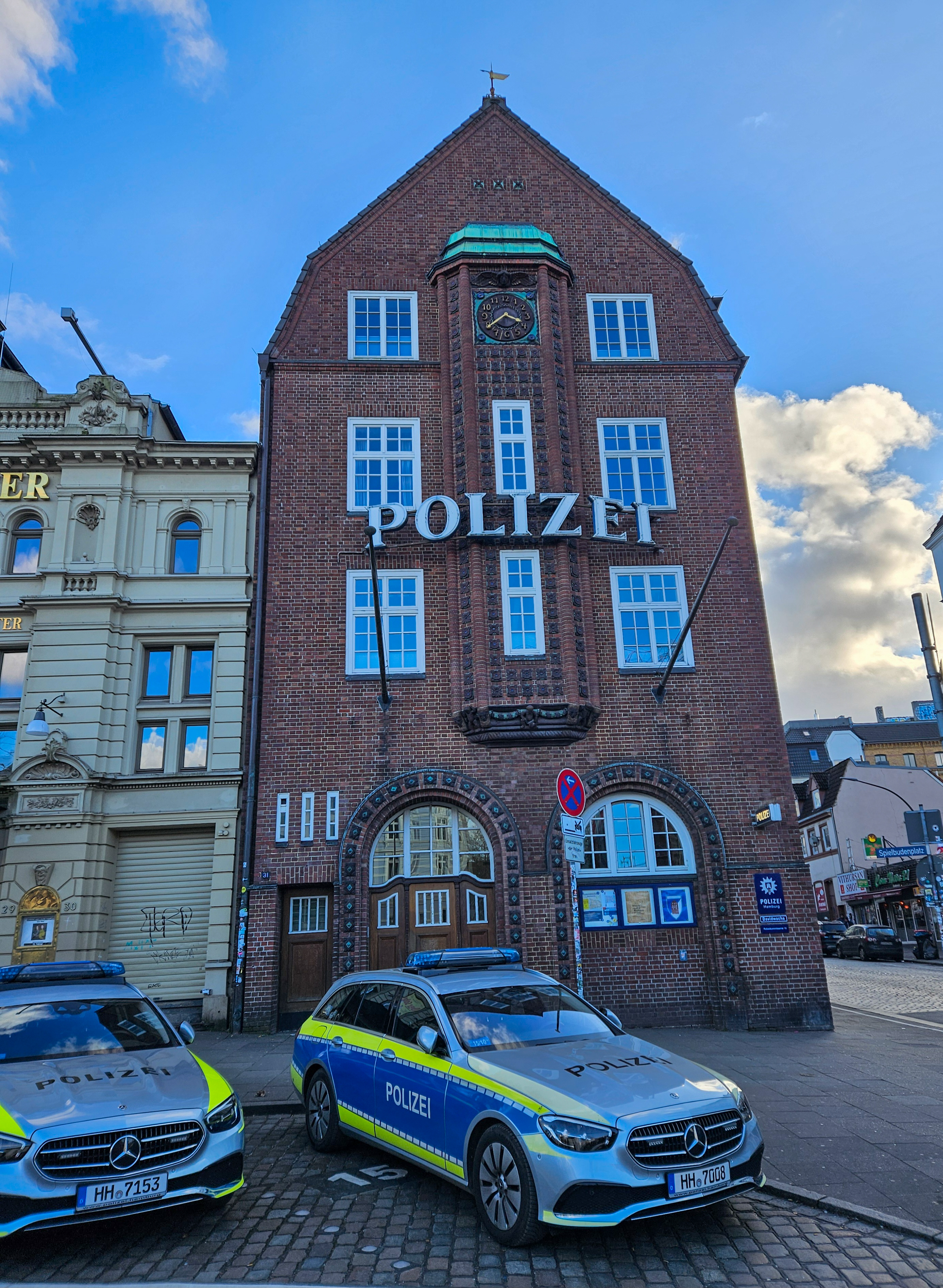
Davidwache in 2025

The Davidwache ("David's watch") is a police station in Hamburg, Germany. It is located in the St. Pauli quarter, near Reeperbahn, at the corner of Spielbudenplatz square and Davidstraße. Today, it is the seat of Hamburg Police Department 15.

While Davidwache has existed since 1840, the listed brick building was erected by Fritz Schumacher from 1913 to 1914 and opened on 10 December 1914. Sculptor Richard Kuöhl designed the ceramic elements of the station house. In 2004–2005, an extension was added at the back. The building is known from numerous movies and TV series, and Paul McCartney and Pete Best once had to spend a night there.
