= Hotel Luxor =

Brothel in Hamburg, Germany (1946–2008)

- Mehrer Hotel
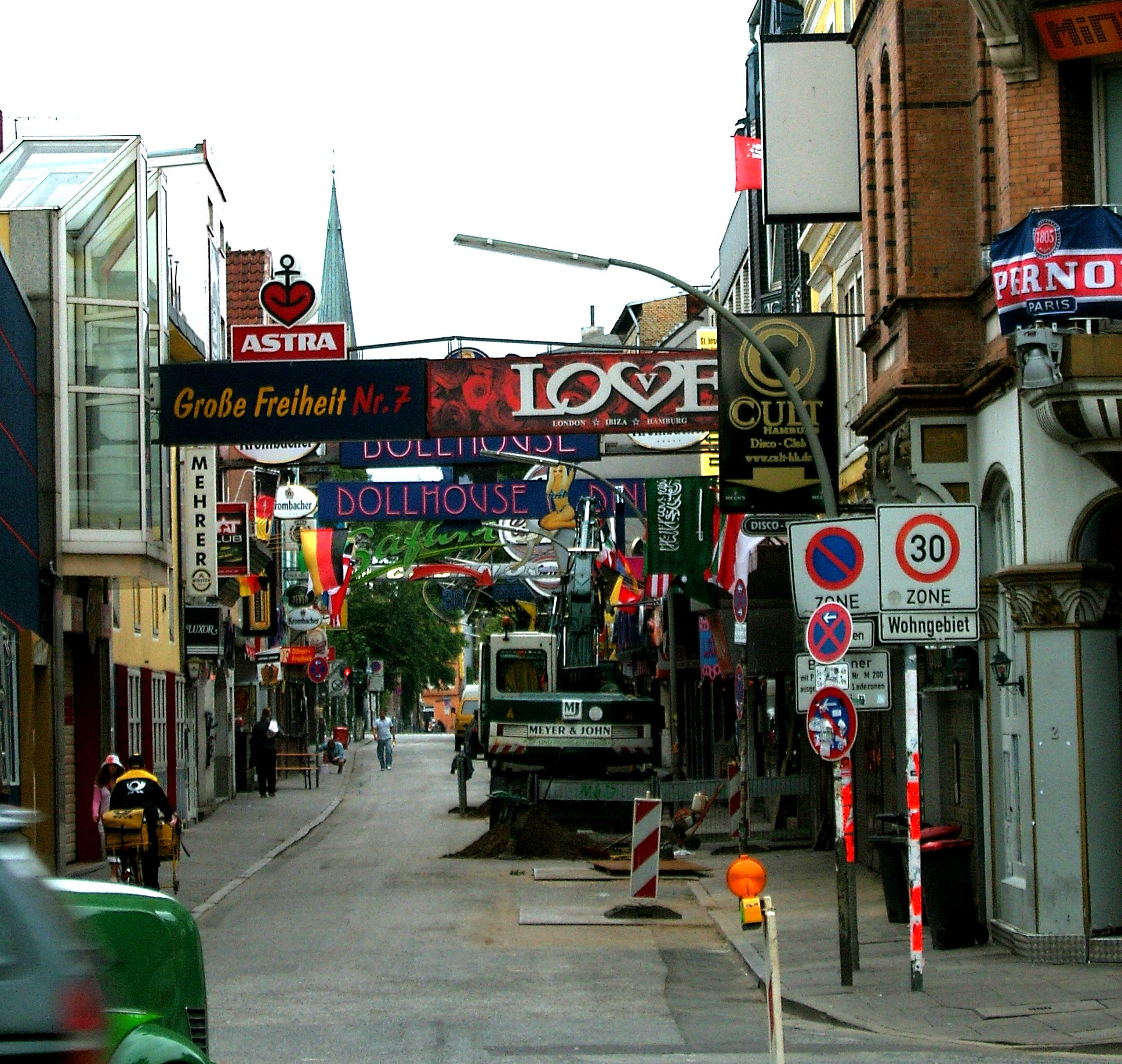
- Große Freiheit in 2006. Hotel Luxor is on the left with the Mehrer sign.

- Location in Hamburg
- Address: Große Freiheit, St. Pauli
- Location: Hamburg, Germany
- Coordinates: 53°33′2.0″N 9°57′27.0″E
- Owner: Mehrer family
- Event: Brothel

Construction
- Opened: 1948
- Closed: 2008

The Hotel Luxor, also known as the Mehrer Hotel was the oldest brothel in Hamburg until its closure in April 2008. It was located on Große Freiheit in St. Pauli red-light district and first opened in 1948.

== History ==
The Luxor was first opened in 1948 and most of its clients were from the nearby docks. By the 1960s the brothel had gained an international reputation and was especially popular with Japanese visitors.

The golden age of Luxor was the 1970s, when up to twelve prostitutes worked in the house at the same time, and it was open 24 hours a day, 7 days a week. The 1980s HIV epidemic affected the area badly and most of the other brothels in the area closed. In 1987, Waltraud Mehrer took over the running of the brothel from her father-in-law, who had first opened the brothel.

The harbour was modernised in the 1990s. As a result of this, the number of sailors and dockers (who were a significant percentage of the brothel's clientele) coming to the Luxor reduced.

=== Closure ===
The Luxor was hosted by Mrs. Waltraud Mehrer for its last 21 years. At the time of its closure it only opened 4 days a week and just 4 women worked there. In March 2008, Ms. Mehrer announced that she would close the pleasure house due to the unprofitably of the business.
