= Bambule =

Bambule, a term of German prison sociolect, originally refers to a form of mostly non-violent prison protest, typically effected by banging hard items against the cells' metal bars. The term is derived from the African dance Bamboule or Bamboula.

== Bambule protests in Hamburg 2002 ==
A trailer park in the St. Pauli quarter in Hamburg was dubbed Bambule. It was evicted on November 4, 2002, due to the Senate's decision not to tolerate this form of residence. The main reason, however, was the plan to extend the fair grounds and the attempt to reorganize urban structure. The eviction was mainly supported by the conservative parties. The inhabitants of Bambule paid neither rent, nor for electricity or for water. In response, Bambule offered to pay for infrastructure, but the Senate, mayor Ole von Beust, and Ronald Schill rejected any negotiations.

The eviction of the illegally squatted RFCspace was carried out under heavy protests. Inhabitants of other squats, but also the residents of St. Pauli and the Schanzenviertel, showed their solidarity and criticised the Senate's zero tolerance policy. Soon, the protests culminated in violent demonstrations and radical actions.

Due to the large wave of protest, the Senate decided on a temporary solution and offered Bambule an alternative space on a limited lease.

== Other uses of the term ==
- Bambule (film) is a 1970 West German television film about a group of borstal girls in West Berlin, written by Ulrike Meinhof. Because she went underground with the Red Army Faction (also known as "Baader-Meinhof Group") just ten days before the movie's scheduled initial screening, the movie was not shown until 1994.
- A record published 1998 by Absolute Beginner from Hamburg is named "Bambule".
- London-based experimental group Cindytalk have an electronic side-project called Bambule (named after the Ulrike Meinhof film) which has released two records on Praxis Records (1996 and 2000).
