= Reeperbahn =

Street in Hamburg, Germany

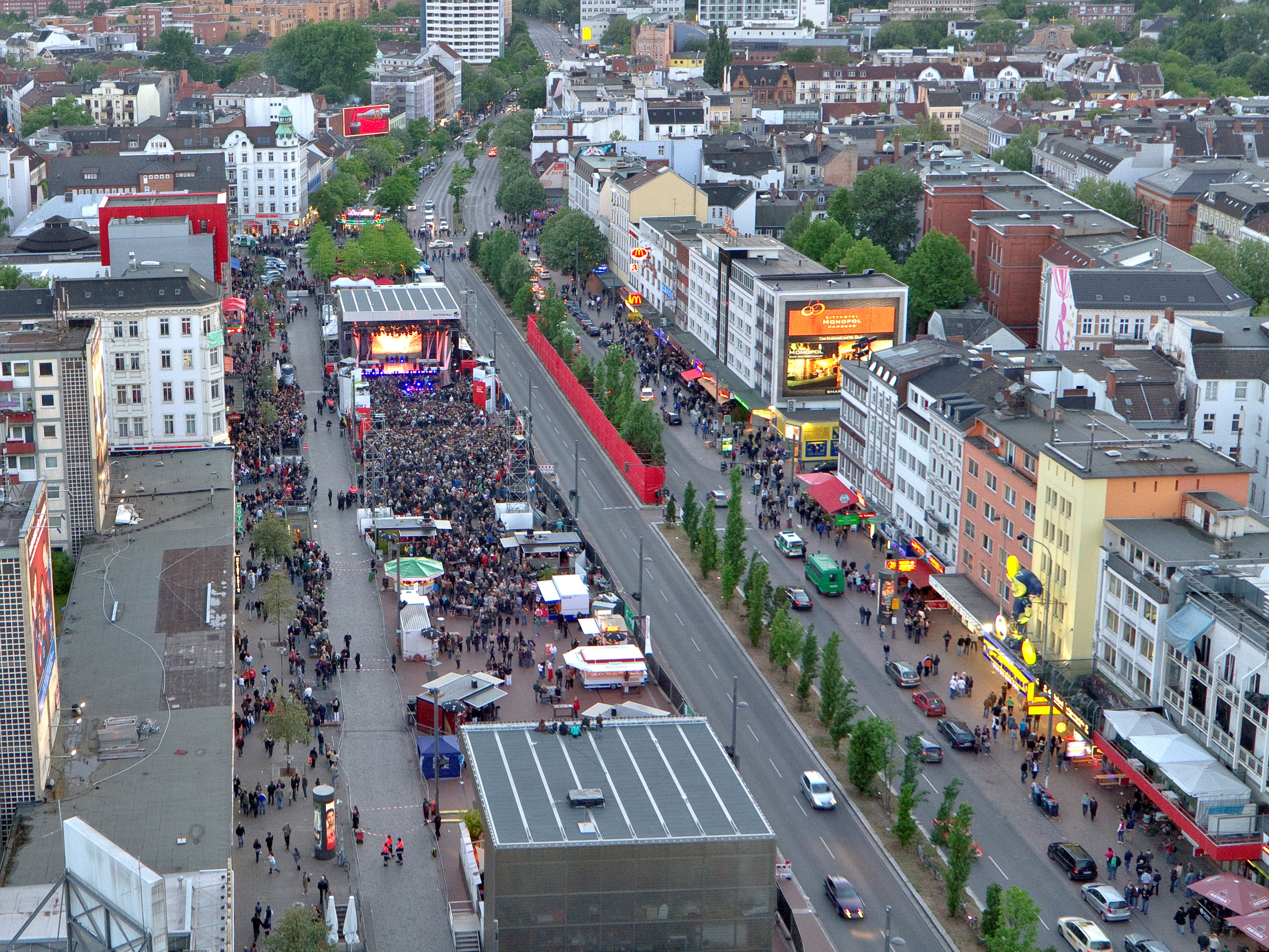
- Reeperbahn (right) passing Spielbudenplatz
- Interactive map of Reeperbahn
- Length: 930 m (3,050 ft)
- Location: St. Pauli, Hamburg, Germany
- Postal code: 20359, 22767
- Nearest metro station: Reeperbahn; St. Pauli
- Coordinates: 53°32′58″N 9°57′44″E
- Millerntor end: Millerntorplatz
- Major junctions: Davidstraße, Große Freiheit
- Nobistor end: Holstenstraße

Other
- Known for: Night life, prostitution

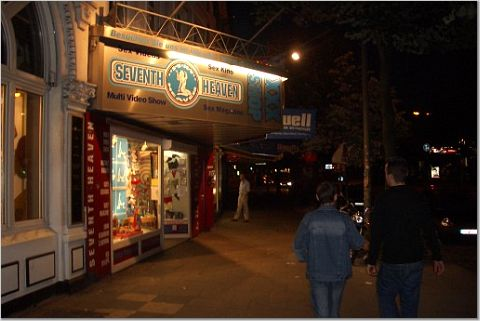
A sex shop on the Reeperbahn

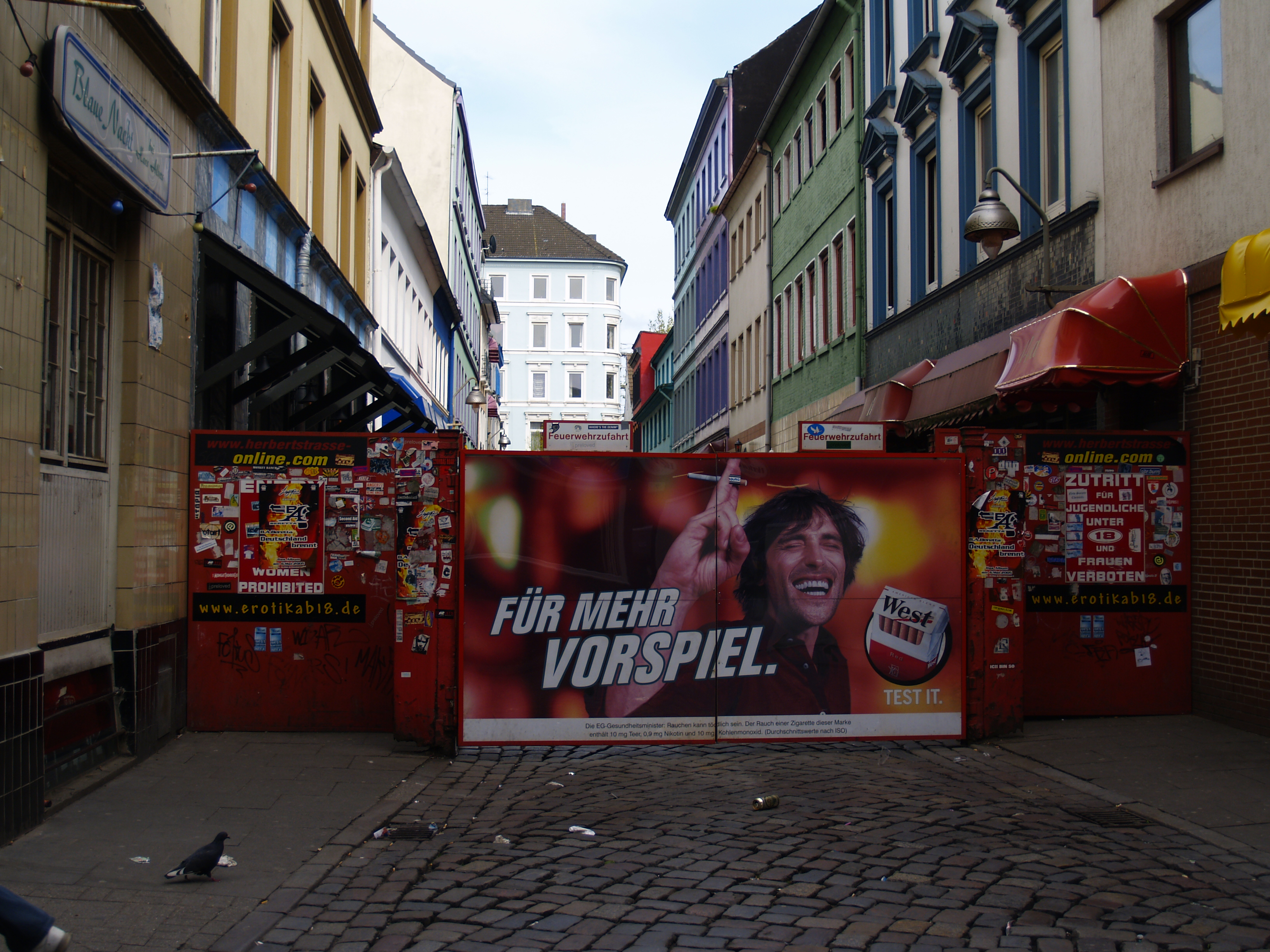
Entrance to Herbertstraße; red sign to the right of the gate reads "No entrance for juveniles under 18 years of age and women". The large cigarette ad reads literally, "For more foreplay."

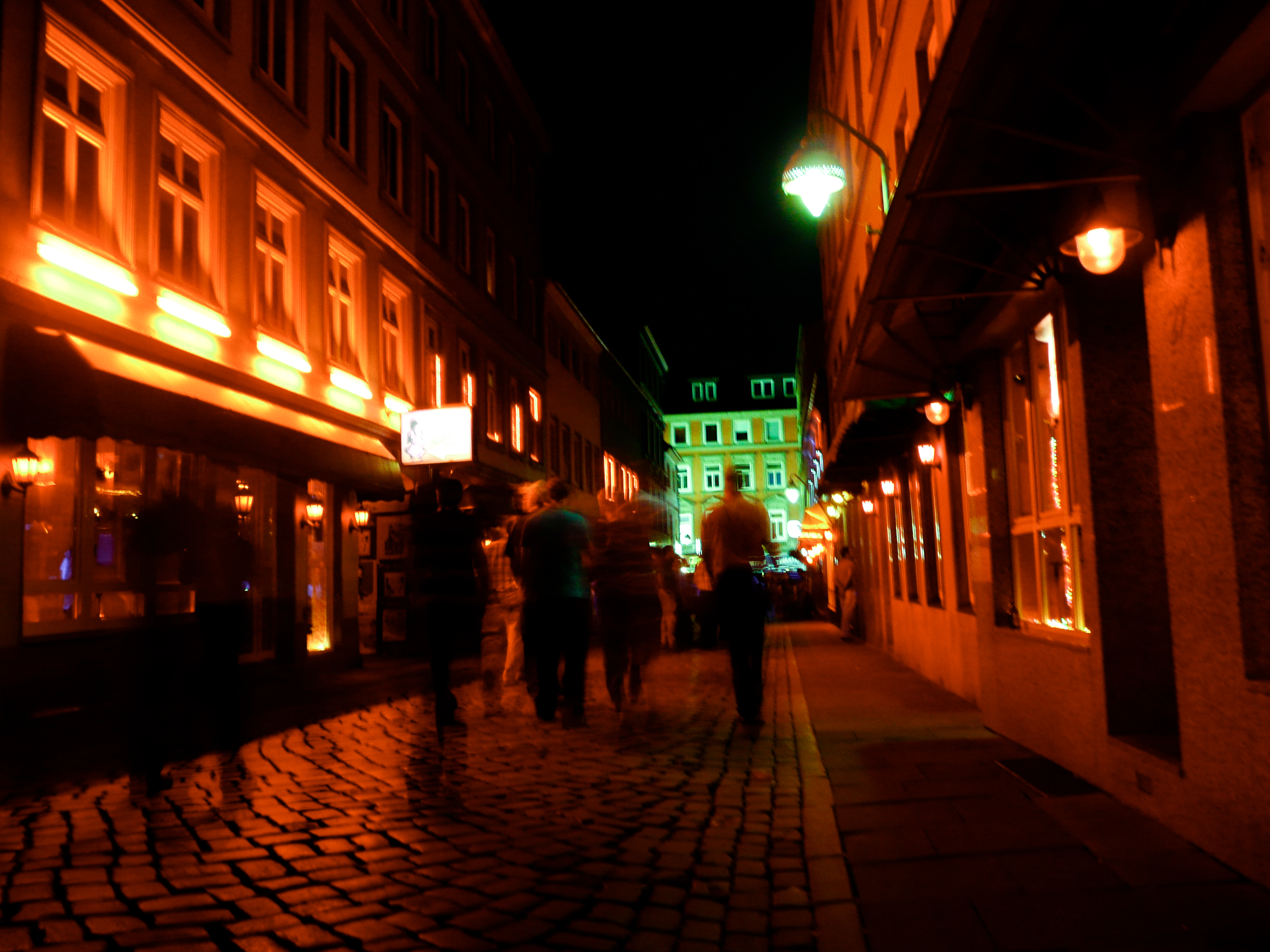
Inside Herbertstraße

The Reeperbahn (German: [ˈʁeːpɐˌbaːn]) is a street and entertainment district in Hamburg's St. Pauli district, one of the two centres of Hamburg's nightlife (the other being Sternschanze) and also the city's major red-light district. In German, it is also nicknamed die sündige Meile ('the sinful mile') and Kiez. The Reeperbahn Festival is among the largest club festivals.

== Name and history ==
The name Reeperbahn means 'ropewalk', which is a place where ropes are made (from Low German: Reep, 'rope' – the standard German word is Seil – and Bahn, 'track'). Until the 1620s Hamburg's ropewalks had been located in the Neustadt ('new town') quarter of the inner city close to the Elbe, which then became a densely built up area. Therefore, the ropewalks "had to be relocated outside the city walls on the country road leading toward Altona – which later took on the street name 'Reeperbahn'." The street was a ropewalk in the 17th and 18th centuries.

== The street and its side streets ==
The street is lined with restaurants, night clubs, discotheques and bars. There are also strip clubs, sex shops, brothels and similar businesses. Between 1997 and 2007 the Erotic Art Museum was open on Nobistor, a street running between the Reeperbahn and Louise-Schroeder-Straße.

The Operettenhaus, a musical theatre, is also located on the Reeperbahn. It played Andrew Lloyd Webber's Cats for many years; after that Mamma Mia!, an ABBA-musical, followed by "Ich war noch niemals in New York" ("I have never been to New York"), a jukebox musical featuring hit songs by Austrian singer/songwriter Udo Jürgens, then Sister Act and finally Rocky, based on the Stallone film. There are other theatres on the Reeperbahn (St. Pauli Theater, Imperial Theater, Schmidt Theater, Schmidt's Tivoli) and also several cabarets/varietés.

A famous landmark is the Davidwache, a police station located on the south side of the Reeperbahn at the cross street Davidstraße. Street prostitution is legal during certain times of the day on Davidstraße. The Herbertstraße, a short side street off the Davidstraße, has sex workers displaying themselves behind windows, waiting for customers. Since 1933, large screens have blocked the view into Herbertstraße from the adjacent streets. Since the 1970s, there have been signs saying that entrance to the street is prohibited for women and juveniles; however, it is a public road which anyone may enter. Many pubs, and street-based sex workers can be found on the square of Hans-Albers-Platz south of the Reeperbahn.

The Große Freiheit ("Great Freedom") is a street starting on the north side with several bars, clubs, and a Catholic church. In former years, several sex theatres here (Salambo, Regina, Colibri, Safari) would show live sex acts on stage. As of 2007, until its closure in 2013, the Safari was the only live sex theatre left in Germany. The popular table dance club Dollhouse now takes the place of the Salambo. Hotel Luxor, Hamburg's oldest brothel that had operated on this street for 60 years, was closed in 2008. The street's name comes from the fact that Catholics were allowed to practise their religion here at a time when this district did not yet belong to Hamburg; they were forbidden from doing so in Protestant Hamburg proper.

In 1967, Europe's largest brothel at the time, the six-floor Eros Center, was opened on the Reeperbahn. It was closed in the late 1980s amidst the AIDS scare.

At a major trial during 2006 and 2007, ten members of the "Marek Gang", which controls brothels on and near the Reeperbahn, were charged with pimping. The judge rejected the charge of forming a criminal gang and handed out suspended sentences: the men had started relationships with young women in local discotheques in order to recruit them to work in their brothels, an illegal practice if the women are under 21 years of age; some men had also abused some of the women who worked for them.

Because of the problems with the high crime rate, in 2007 the Senate of Hamburg enacted a ban on weapons in the Reeperbahn area. The only other such area with a weapons ban in Hamburg is the Hansaplatz, St. Georg.

The St Pauli Preservation Society decries the ongoing gentrification of the area. Several older residents blamed the decline of the Reeperbahn's sex industry on the rise of discotheques and cheap bars that attract teenage customers. In 2013, the Dancing Towers were built at the eastern end of Reeperbahn, symbolizing a couple dancing tango. The increasing number of these and other modern buildings erected at the Reeperbahn attracted criticism by some St. Pauli inhabitants.

The Reeperbahn was hit hard by the COVID-19 pandemic. Almost every establishment was forced to close. Pulverfass Cabaret is one of the drag venues.

== The Beatles ==
In the early 1960s, The Beatles (who had not yet become world-famous) played in several clubs around the Reeperbahn, including the Star-Club, Kaiserkeller, Top Ten (Reeperbahn 136) and Indra. Stories about the band's residencies, onstage and offstage antics are legendary; some stories are true (John Lennon played a song set with a toilet seat around his neck), others inflated (the band urinating in an alley as nuns walked past was told rather differently later). A fellow musician, Ted "Kingsize" Taylor, made a crude tape recording of their last New Year's Eve show, at the Star-Club in December 1962; a cleaned-up version of the tape was later released as an album, later characterized by Harrison as "awful".

Famously, John Lennon is quoted: "I might have been born in Liverpool – but I grew up in Hamburg".

To mark the historical importance of their time in Hamburg, a Beatles-Platz was built at the cross of Reeperbahn and Große Freiheit.

== In popular culture ==
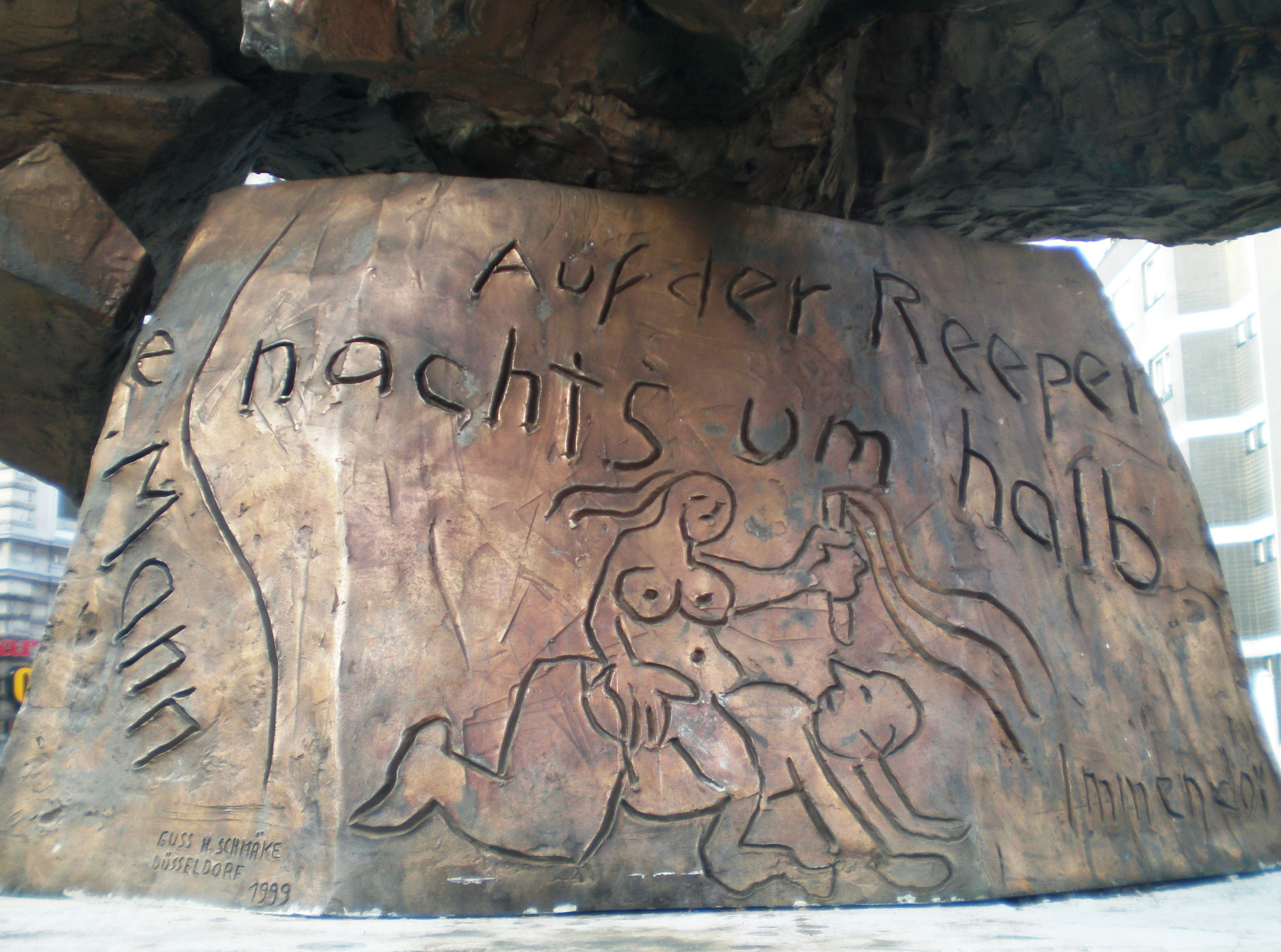
Socle of Hans Albers statue at the Hans-Albers-Platz, by Jörg Immendorff 1986. Auf der Reeperbahn nachts um halb eins

The popular 1944 movie Große Freiheit Nr. 7 tells the story of a singer (played by Hans Albers) who works in a Reeperbahn club and falls in love with a girl played by Ilse Werner. Hans Albers and Heinz Rühmann played in the 1954 movie Auf der Reeperbahn nachts um halb eins (On the Reeperbahn at Half Past Midnight, after a song of the same name sung by Albers in the 1944 film).

"Reeperbahn" is a 1978 song by Udo Lindenberg, to the tune of Penny Lane, lamenting the decay of the entertainment there.

In the 1965 film Ship of Fools, Jose Ferrer and Christiane Schmidtmer sang "Heute Abend Geh'n Wir Bummeln Auf Der Reeperbahn" ("Tonight We Will Go Strolling on The Reeperbahn").

The Police song "Low Life" is about the Reeperbahn.

Randy Pie's 1975 song "Kitsch" is about a curiosity shop on the Reeperbahn—the group hailed from Hamburg.

Reeperbahn is the name of a 1980s Swedish band.

Finnish artist Irwin Goodman has a song and an album called St. Pauli ja Reeperbahn.

The street is also mentioned in

- Elvis Costello song "Human Hands",
- Van Morrison's song "Heavy Connection",
- Paul Kelly's song "Every Fucking City"
- Midnight Oil song "Mountains of Burma"
- Sloppy Seconds song "Germany" from their album Destroyed and in the Runrig song "Song of the Earth".
- heavy metal band Blue Cheer have a song called "Sweet Child of the Reeperbahn" on their 1991 album Dining with the Sharks
- punk band The Toy Dolls have a song titled "Caught up the Reeperbahn", first released on their 1993 album Absurd-Ditties.

"Reeperbahn" is the name of a track from the Christian rock group Model Engine's CD The Lean Years Tradition.

The Reeperbahn is often mentioned in Karen Duve's 1999 novel, Regenroman. (The English translation is entitled Rain).

Tom Waits' 2002 release Alice contains a track called "Reeperbahn".

Zodiac Mindwarp & The Love Reaction released the track 'Christmas Eve on the Reeperbahn' on their 2002 album I Am Rock.

Dutch DJ and producer Nicky Romero had the music video for his song "Toulouse" shot in Hamburg, Germany. Near the end, the actors enter the Reeperbahn's subway system.

Australian pop-punk band the Hard-Ons have a song called "Don't Fear The Reeperbahn" on their 2007 album Most People Are Nicer Than Us. Its title is a play on the Blue Öyster Cult song "(Don't Fear) The Reaper".

German electro house duo Digitalism recorded the song "Reeperbahn" on their 2011 release I Love You Dude.

Udo Lindenberg recorded 2011 a song titled "Reeperbahn" live together with Jan Delay.

The commercial house music producer Eric Prydz has a track titled "Reeperbahn" under his moniker Pryda.

London based indie band Spector have a bonus track titled "Reeperbahn" on the deluxe version of their 2015 album Moth Boys.

UK-based folk rock band Skinny Lister wrote a song titled "Hamburg Drunk", which depicts a rough night "falling and sprawling down the old Reeperbahn" on their 2016 album The Devil, The Heart and the Fight.

== See also ==
- Prostitution in Germany
