= Hans-Albers-Platz =

Square in St. Pauli, Hamburg, Germany

Coordinates: 53°32′55″N 9°57′39″E

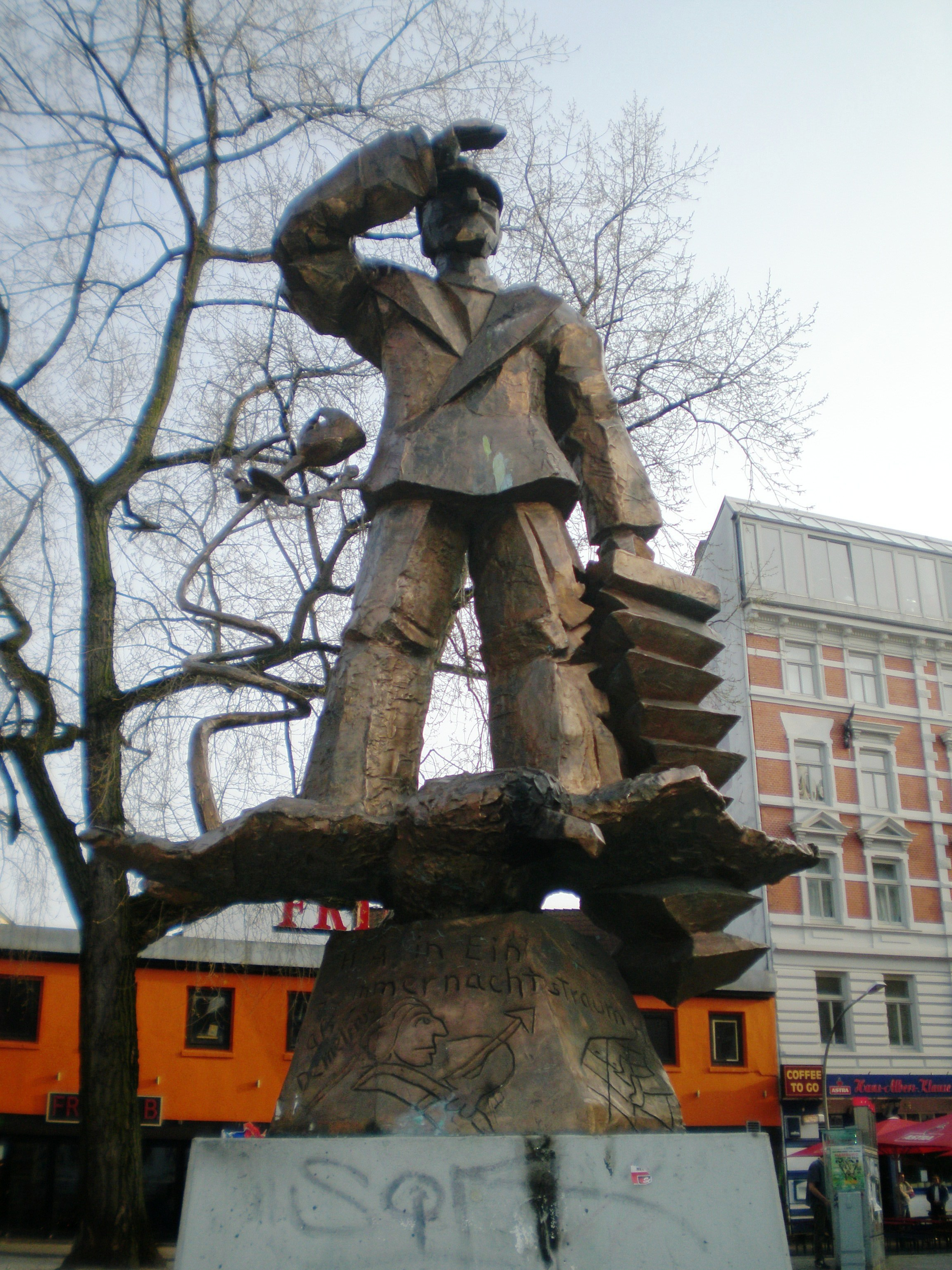
Hans Albers Memorial on the square

Hans-Albers-Platz (Hans Albers square) is a square in St. Pauli, Hamburg, Germany. It is one of the most popular places and tourist attractions within the red light district south of the famous street of Reeperbahn. It is named after the actor and singer Hans Albers.

== History ==
Four years after his death in 1960, the former Wilhelmplatz (until 1899: Wilhelmstraße) had been renamed in Hans-Albers-Platz in honour of Albers. In 1986, a statue of him, made by sculptor Jörg Immendorff was erected here. Immendorff owned the La Paloma, a bar popular with artists, at the square since 1984. As there was a dispute between the authorities and Immendorff, the original statue was moved to Düsseldorf nine years later, where it can be found today in the Medienhafen (media harbour). However, later on, the Hamburg senate ordered a copy from Immendorff, which was installed on Hans-Albers-Platz again. The square is also called Kleiner Kiez (lit. small hood), with Kiez being a frequent term for the whole Reeperbahn area.

There are many pubs around the square, but also prostitutes waiting for clients. The Hamburg S-Bahn station of Reeperbahn is located nearby.
