= Randy Pie =

German rock/funk band

- Origin: Hamburg, Germany
- Genres: Rock, funk, disco, synthpop
- Years active: 1972 – 1977; 1986
- Label: WEA
- Spinoff of: The Rattles
- Past members: Bernd Wippich † Manfred "Tissy" Thiers; Jochen Petersen; Dicky Tarrach; Werner Becker; Jean-Jacques Kravetz; Peter French; Claus-Robert Kruse; Nils O. Tuxen Frank Diez

Randy Pie was a moderately successful German rock / funk band based in Hamburg, which was active between 1972 and 1977, and briefly in 1986. Formed by Dicky Tarrach, and mostly originating as ex-members of the pop group The Rattles they started as the Randy Pie & Family. Deep Purple's then guitarist Ritchie Blackmore was guested on their single "Hurry to the City". Later they simplified their name into Randy Pie. Many of the musicians in Randy Pie were also involved in the experimental rock albums of Achim Reichel. Bassist Manfred Thiers had come from the hard-rock progressive band Gash. In 2009, singer - guitarist Bernd Wippich launched Randy Pie Reloaded, on which he was the only Randy Pie musician. Wippich died in March 2014

== Discography ==
- Randy Pie (1973)
- Highway Driver (1974)
- Kitsch (1975)
- Dance (If You Want It) part 1 & 2 (single, 1976)
- England England (live album, 1976)
- Fast Forward (1977)
- Magic Ferry (1986)
