= St. Pauli =

- Quarter of Hamburg
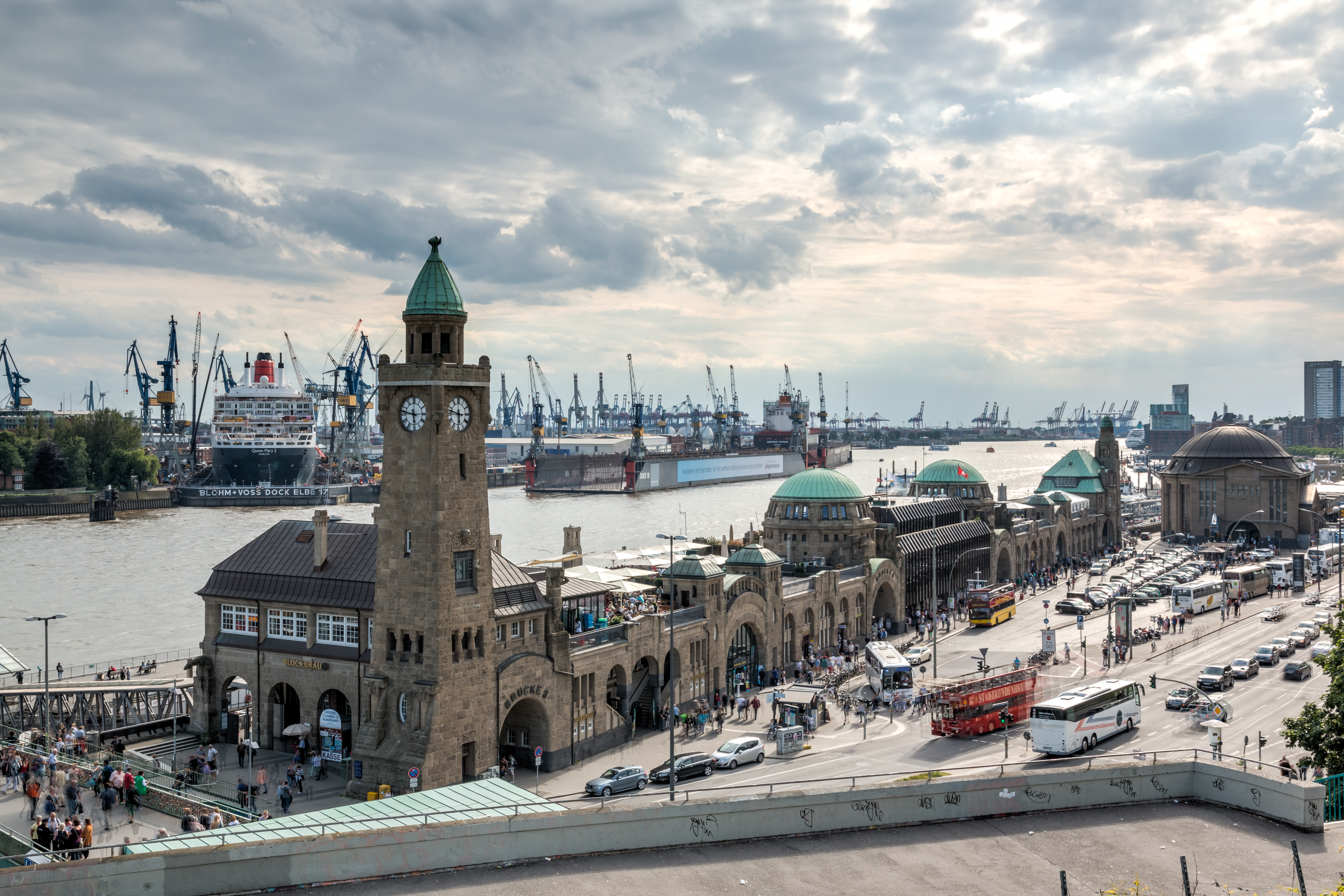
- St. Pauli Piers and the port of Hamburg
- Interactive map of St. Pauli
- Location within Germany Location within Hamburg
- Coordinates: 53°33′25″N 9°57′50″E
- Country: Germany
- State: Hamburg
- City: Hamburg

Area
  - Total: 2.6 km^{2} (1.0 sq mi)

Population (2024-12-31)
  - Total: 22,377
  - Density: 8,600/km^{2} (22,000/sq mi)
- Time zone: UTC+01:00 (CET)
  - Summer (DST): UTC+02:00 (CEST)
- Dialling codes: 040
- Vehicle registration: HH

St. Pauli (German pronunciation: [ˌzaŋkt ˈpaʊli]; sometimes spelled in full as Sankt Pauli) is a quarter of the city of Hamburg belonging to the centrally located Hamburg-Mitte borough. Situated on the right bank of the Elbe river, the nearby Landungsbrücken is a northern part of the port of Hamburg. St. Pauli contains a world-famous red-light district around the iconic Reeperbahn area. As of 2020 the area had 21,902 residents.

== History ==
At the beginning of the 17th century, it developed as a suburb called 'Hamburger Berg' (Hamburg mountain) outside the gates of the nearby city of Hamburg and close to the city of Altona. The name comes from a hill in that area intended for defensive use in 1620 (it provided an unobstructed field of fire for artillery). Therefore, settlement was initially not allowed there, but soon businesses, which were desired inside neither Hamburg nor Altona, e.g., for their smell or noise, were relegated to 'Hamburger Berg'. Furthermore, the rope makers (or 'Reeper' in Low German) were placed here because in the city it was hard to find enough space for their work.

The name of St. Pauli's most famous street Reeperbahn, or "Rope Maker's Walk," harkens back to its rope-making past. When people were officially allowed to live in St. Pauli at the end of the 17th century the city government moved workhouses and (pestilence) hospitals out of the city to 'Hamburger Berg,' which later was named after its church, 'St. Pauli' (Saint Paul), although this church is now in a different quarter due to changing district boundaries. St. Pauli was mainly used by sailors for entertainment during their stay in Hamburg and Altona. To this day it is known as the "sinful mile," combining the upper and lower standards of entertainment, from musicals, theaters, to bars and clubs, as well as the most known red light district.

There have been various social issues and conflicts during the last decades, including the Hafenstraße, Rote Flora and Bambule.

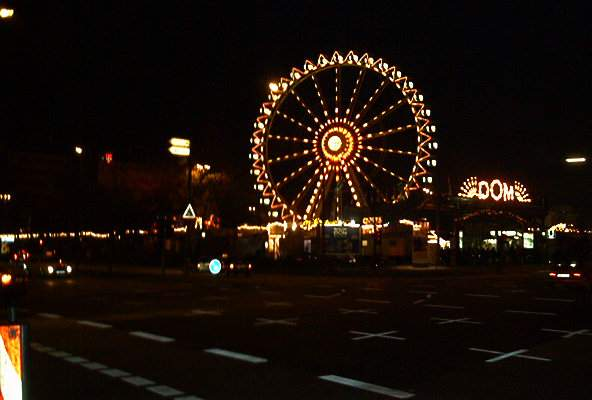
The annual fair "Hamburger Dom" at night

=== Chinatown ===
Hamburg, as a major port city, has very close ties to China and Asia in general. Since around 1890, it was home to the Chinesenviertel Chinatown area within its St. Pauli district (around Schmuckstrasse), which was shut down by the Nazis in the 1930s. The St. Pauli Chinatown has been reestablishing itself since the 2010s. The city of Hamburg also hosts the biennial high-level conference Hamburg Summit: China meets Europe, has a major Chinese consulate at Elbchaussee 268 in Othmarschen since 1921, and has Shanghai as a sister city. A large contingent of Chinese and other Asian immigrants continue to live in the St. Pauli and Altona districts, while new arrivals also gravitate to this part of the city.

== Politics ==
These are the results of St. Pauli in the Hamburg state election:

Election year	Left	Greens	SPD	CDU	AfD	FDP	Others
2025	36.0 %	26.2 %	20.3 %	5.2 %	3.3 %	1.0 %	8.1 %
2020	29.1 %	35.3 %	19.1 %	3.0 %	2.4 %	2.0 %	9.1 %
2015	28.9 %	24.6 %	26.4 %	4.1 %	3.0 %	3.2 %	9.8 %
2011	20.1 %	21.5 %	37.4 %	5.8 %	–	1.9 %	13.3 %
2008	15.0 %	21.0 %	41.2 %	15.3 %	–	3.3 %	4.2 %
2004	–	39.4 %	28.8 %	18.3 %	–	1.3 %	12.2 %
2001	1.2 %	27.6 %	35.2 %	10.0 %	–	1.9 %	24.1 %
1997	3.7 %	35.9 %	27.7 %	12.7 %	–	1.5 %	18.5 %
1993	–	34.5 %	33.8 %	9.6 %	–	1.5 %	20.6 %
1991	2.7 %	24.2 %	42.5 %	17.9 %	–	1.7 %	11.0 %
1987	–	26.0 %	45.1 %	25.2 %	–	2.0 %	1.7 %
1986	–	29.2 %	39.9 %	26.3 %	–	2.4 %	2.2 %
Dec. 1982	–	15.7 %	56.7 %	24.9 %	–	1.3 %	1.4 %
June 1982	–	14.9 %	48.7 %	30.6 %	–	2.6 %	3.2 %
1978	–	7.7 %	60.9 %	24.2 %	–	2.8 %	4.4 %
1974	–	–	57.4 %	29.0 %	–	7.3 %	6.3 %
1970	–	–	68.0 %	21.6 %	–	3.5 %	6.9 %
1966	–	–	72.5 %	19.4 %	–	4.3 %	3.8 %

== Geography ==
It is situated directly on the north bank of the Elbe river close to the port of Hamburg. It is located south of Eimsbüttel, west of Hamburg-Neustadt and east of Altona. According to the statistical office of Hamburg and Schleswig-Holstein, the quarter has a total area of 2.6 km^{2} (1 sq mi).

== Demographics ==
St. Pauli has 27,612 inhabitants in more than 17,000 households. Immigrants were 27.9% of the population. There were 11.9% with children under the age of 18 and 9.3% of the inhabitants were 65 years of age or older. 63.4% of all households were made up of individuals.

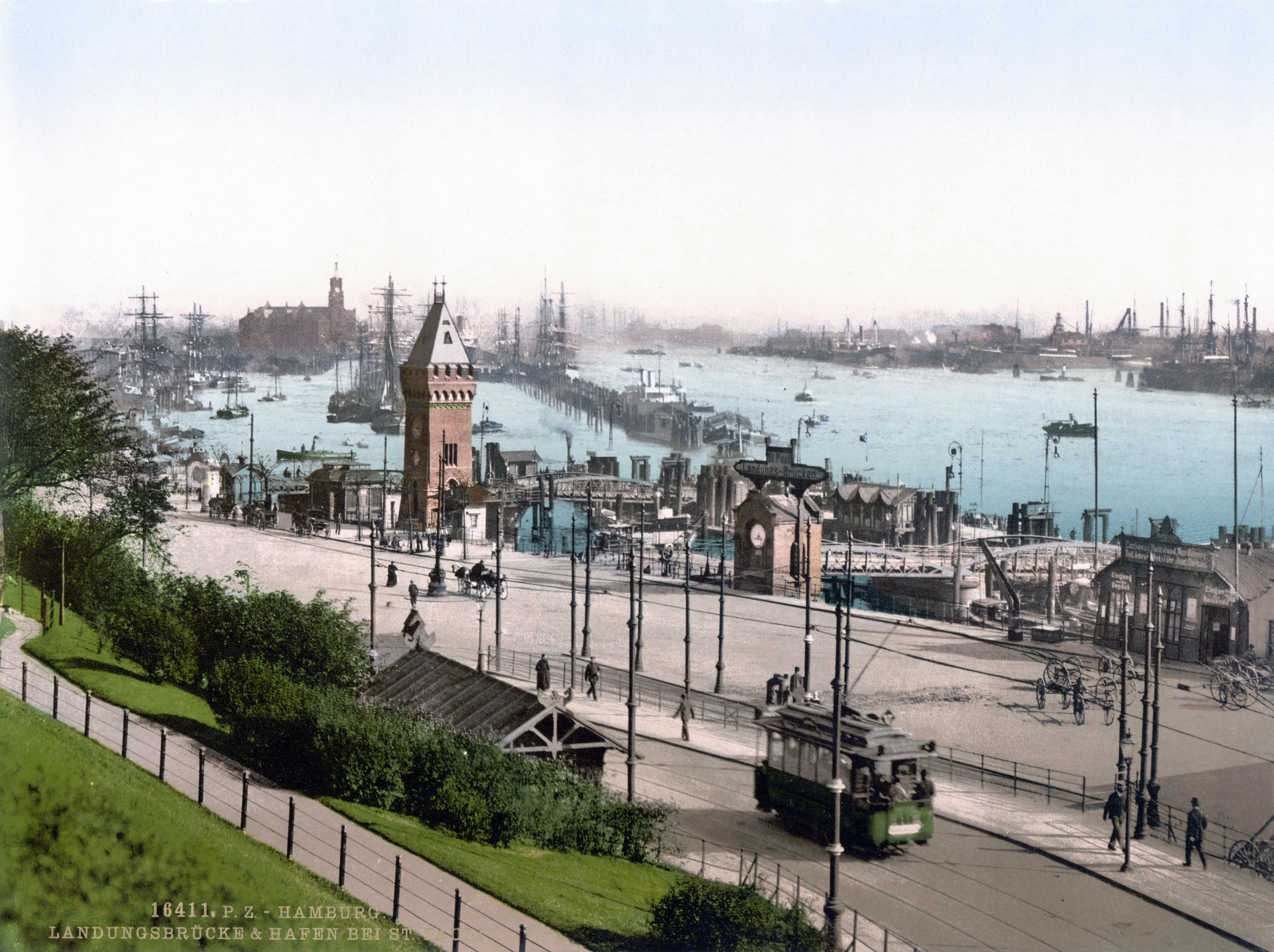
Landungsbrücken in 1900

== Education ==
The Bernhard Nocht Institute for Tropical Medicine (BNI) is located in the Bernhard Nocht Straße 7. It is a research center for tropical and infectious diseases and provides an information center about health risks, vaccinations and medical data about other countries for tourism and travel advice. The research facility formerly located in the Bernhard Nocht Straße hospital is now in the University Medical Center Hamburg-Eppendorf (UKE), Martinistraße 52. BNI website

In 2006 there were two elementary schools and a secondary school in St. Pauli.

== Culture, sports and recreation ==
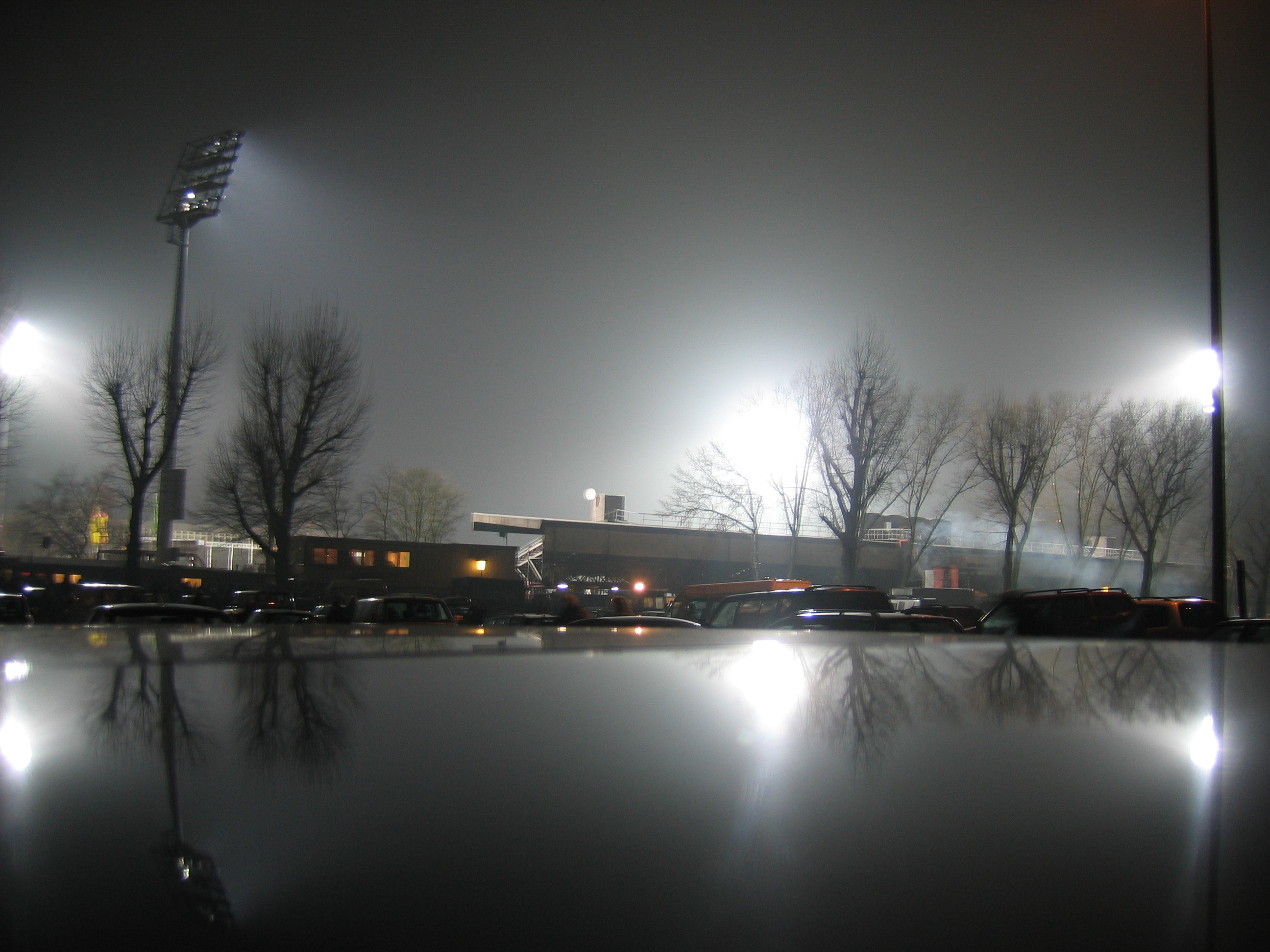
A floodlit Millerntor-Stadion

A prominent symbol is its football club, FC St. Pauli and the Millerntor-Stadion. The club played host to the inaugural FIFI Wild Cup in May–June 2006. In 2010, FC St. Pauli celebrated its centenary. For the jubilee the fan club 18auf12 recorded a song: One Hundred Beers (Words and music by Henning Knorr & Christoph Brüx).

St. Pauli has a long tradition as a recreation and amusement center. The big port of Hamburg led many sailors to Hamburg who preferred to spend their spare time (while their ships were unloaded and loaded again) in this area. Since then there has been prostitution in St. Pauli, and it is still best known as Hamburg's red-light district. The red-light district is an area of a few streets around the Reeperbahn, often referred to as the Kiez.

Bars and music clubs have a tradition in the Kiez St. Pauli. The Beatles lived in St. Pauli and played at the Star-Club before becoming famous. They were honored with the naming of Beatles-Platz square. Actor/singer Hans Albers is strongly associated with St. Pauli, providing the neighborhood's unofficial anthem, with "Auf der Reeperbahn Nachts um Halb Eins" (On the Reeperbahn at Half Past Midnight) from the movie Große Freiheit Nr. 7. The square of Hans-Albers-Platz near Reeperbahn was named after him.

The district is referenced in the song "St Pauli" by Art Brut, which also contains the lyrics "Punk rock ist nicht tot" ("punk rock is not dead").

The Swedish post-industrial rock band Sällskapet's song Nordlicht talks about a pub in the area. The song contains detailed instructions supposedly leading to the location of the pub.

The Guardian in 2012 counted St. Pauli as one of the five best places to live in the world.

=== Voluntary associations ===
Important voluntary/cultural organizations in St. Pauli are:

- Parkhaus e.V. (an integrative living project)
- Kunst- und Kulturverein (culture association) LINDA e.V.
- Buddhistisches Zentrum Hamburg e.V.
- IG St. Pauli und Hafenmeile e.V.
- FC St. Pauli von 1910 e.V.
- CAFE mit Herz e.V.
- Lions-Club Hamburg-St. Pauli
- JUGEND UND SPORT e.V. (Youth and Sport) (social pedagogy projects)
- Viva con Agua de St. Pauli e.V., a charity-based organization located in St. Pauli/Hamburg campaigning for clean drinking water worldwide

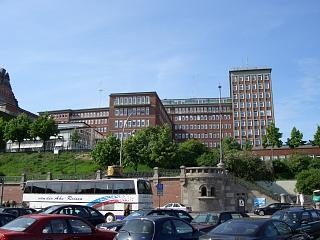
The Federal Maritime and Hydrographic Agency

== Infrastructure ==
The Federal Maritime and Hydrographic Agency Bundesamt für Seeschiffahrt und Hydrographie (BSH) is located in Bernhard Nocht Str. 78. The BSH is a federal authority coming under the jurisdiction of the Federal Ministry of Transport, Building and Urban Affairs. Among other things, it provides information of all matters of maritime shipping, to special funding programs, law for flag, certification of mariners and information of the coasts and coastal waters of Germany. Official website BSH

The head office of Federal Bureau for Maritime Casualty Investigation is in the BSH facility.

The central court buildings of Hamburg, among others of the Hanseatic Higher Regional Court, are located in the quarter at Sievekingplatz square.

=== Transportation ===
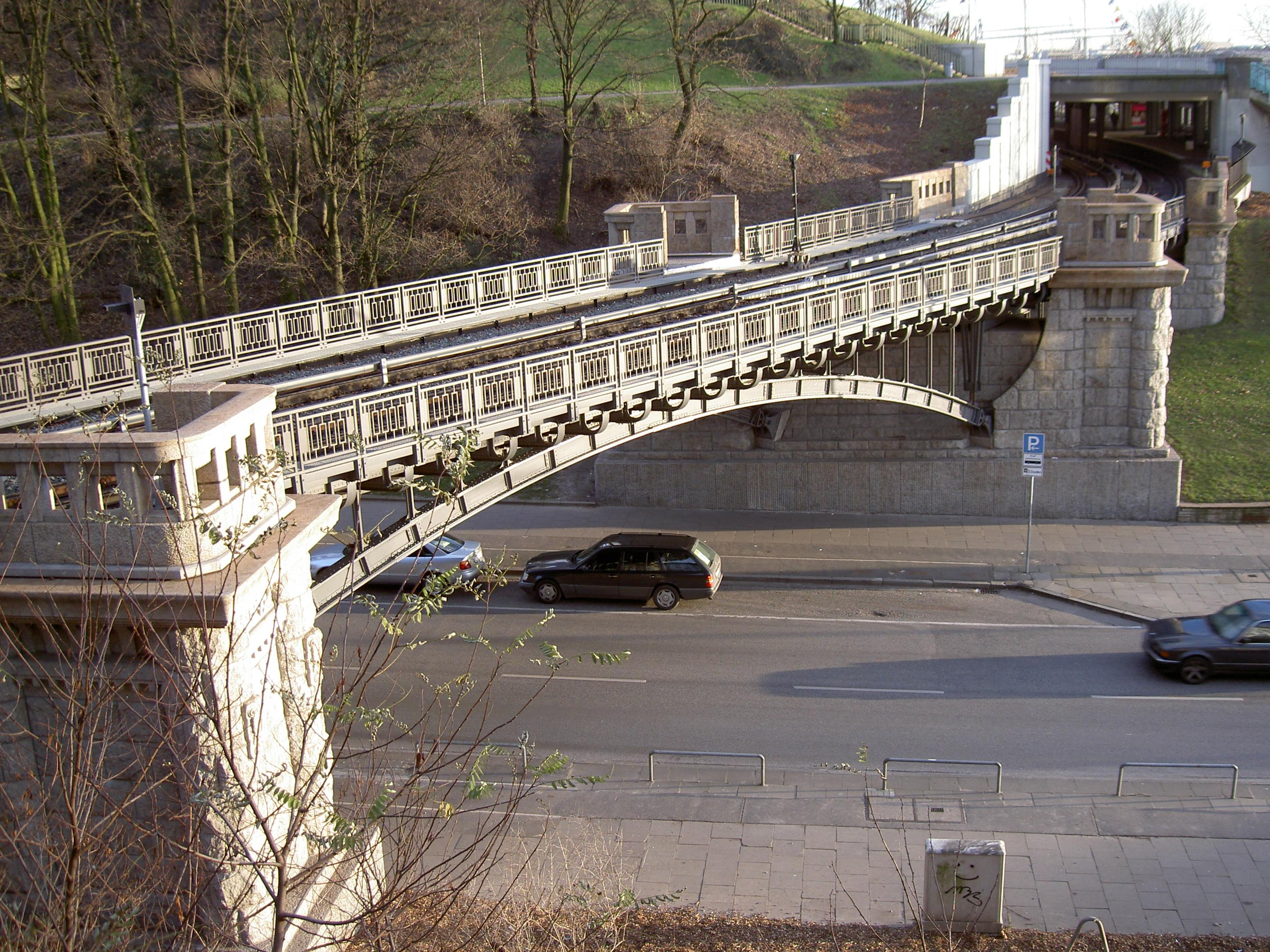
Bridge used by the underground railway near Landungsbrücken station

The Hamburg rapid transit system serves St. Pauli with the Hamburg S-Bahn commuter train stations Landungsbrücken and Reeperbahn and the Hamburg U-Bahn underground stations Landungsbrücken, St. Pauli, and Feldstraße. Public transport is also provided by busses and by ferries along and to the other bank of the Elbe river.

As of 2006, according to the Department of Motor Vehicles (Kraftfahrt-Bundesamt), 5487 private cars were registered in St. Pauli.
