= Mojo Club =

Music venue in Hamburg, Germany

Coordinates: 53°32′58″N 9°58′4″E

- Interactive map of Mojo Club
- Address: Reeperbahn 1; 20359 Hamburg; Germany
- Location: St. Pauli
- Owner: Mojo Club Reeperbahn GmbH
- Capacity: 800
- Type: night club
- Events: jazz, bossa nova, alternative rock, new wave, electronic
- Public transit: St. Pauli

Construction
- Opened: 11 February 1989
- Closed: 2003–2013
- Rebuilt: 2013
- Architect: Thomas Baecker

Website
- Venue Website

The Mojo Club is a music club and live venue in Hamburg, Germany located on the city's famous Reeperbahn. Founded in 1989, it is considered to be a pioneer in the field of modern breakbeat-oriented sounds such as acid jazz and had a major impact on dancefloor jazz. Located in a former bowling alley at No 1 Reeperbahn, the old venue had to make way for a landmark new high rise development and closed its doors in 2003. Following a 10-year hiatus, The Mojo Club re-opened on 2 February 2013 in the same location, underneath the "Dancing Towers", designed by Hamburg-based architect Hadi Teherani, it entrance set into the forecourt of No 1 Reeperbahn, .

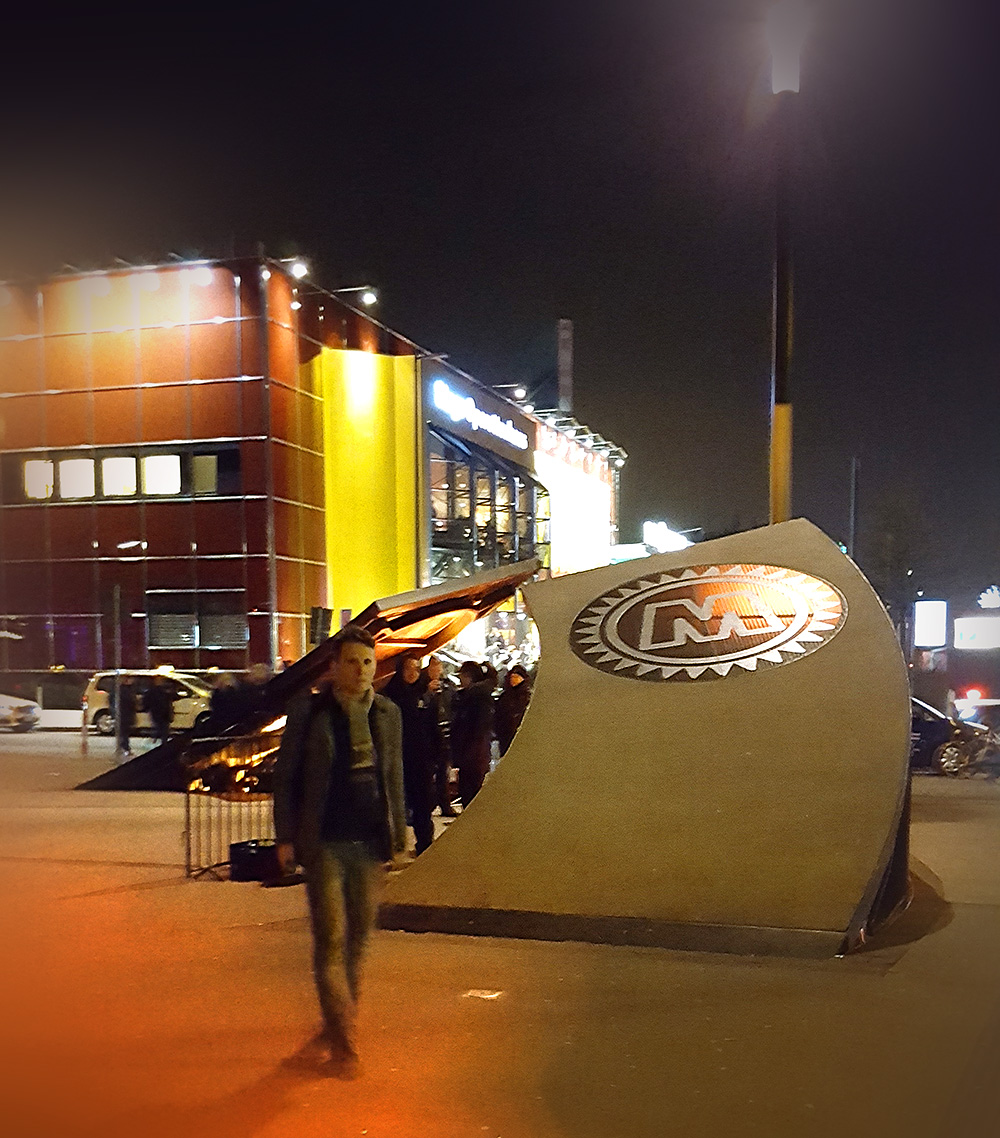
Entrance to the new Mojo Club, No 1 Reeperbahn, Hamburg

== History ==
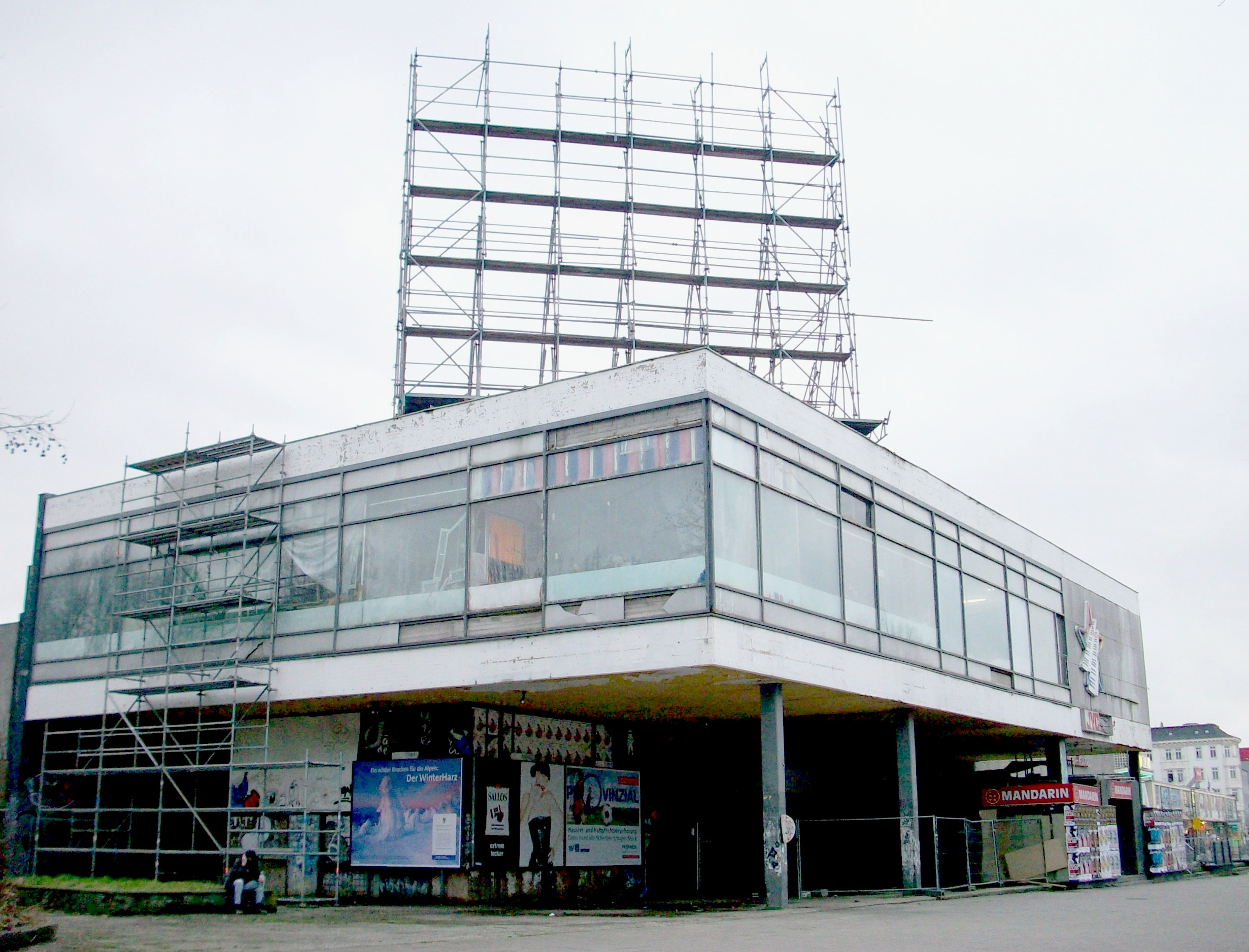
The now demolished, former location of Mojo Club (also on the Reeperbahn)

Founders Oliver Korthals und Leif Nüske started organising Mojo Club parties in Hamburg in 1989.

In 1991, the club found its permantent home in an abandoned bowling alley at the top of Hamburg's famous Reeperbahn, No 1.

Both the location, as well as the iconic logo, a black "M" surrounded by white prongs, quickly became synonymous for the club and the brand.

Its international reputation grew continuously throughout the 90s. As one of the protagonists of the German club scene, it also became the continental stage for the progressive London club sounds.

The genres most prominently featured by the club were Dancefloor Jazz and modern breakbeat sounds like Acid Jazz, including performances by artists like Massive Attack, Moloko, the Propellerheads, De La Soul, Faithless, Black Eyed Peas, D12 feat. Eminem Pizzicato Five, Nightmares On Wax, James Lavelle, Roy Ayers, The Sugarhill Gang, Roni Size, Goldie, the E-Z Rollers as well as Kruder & Dorfmeister. Furthermore, club compilations “Electric Mojo” and “Dancefloor Jazz” became known over the years and an innovative cultural program completed the picture with lectures like “Urban Poetry” and “Macht Club” in 1993 or Raphaël Marionneau's “Le Café Abstrait”, which paved the way for the chill out sound in 1996.

In April 2003 the Mojo Club was closed down and the building was torn down in 2009. Today there are three different building units on the premises of Reeperbahn 1: a twin tower office block, a hotel and the new Mojo Club.

=== 2013 reopening of New Mojo Club ===
Since reopening in 2013, the Mojo Club has moved its focus to becoming a live venue. While the old club hosted an impressive array of performers, the venue was not specifically made for live music. When the club was refurbished, particular attention was paid to meeting the technical specifications for live performances with excellent sound quality and acoustics. Performances at the new Mojo Club so far include Paul Weller, Anderson .Paak, TYLER THE CREATOR, BADBADNOTGOOD, Kokoroko, Mulatu Astatke, Tom Misch, Robert Glasper, Nubya Garcia, Thundercat, FKA TWIGS, Loyle Carner, Sevdaliza, Sons of Kemet, Dua Lipa, Snarky Puppy, The Streets, Ghostface Killah, Janelle Monáe, HIATUS KAIYOT, Celeste and Metric.

== Architecture ==
The Mojo Club reopened in 2013 in the basements of the Dancing Towers, constructed between 2009 and 2012 based on a competition design by Hadi Teherani. The entrance to the club, concealed during the day, is set into the forecourt of No 1 Reeperbahn. In the evening, two hydraulically operated floor gates, decorated with the Mojo "M", open up to reveal the club's stairway entrance. On the ground floor of the Dancing Towers, the Mojo Jazz Café is located next to the entrance.

Designed by Thomas Baecker, the interior design of the club remains minimalistic, so as not to distract from the music. The club is laid out on two floors in a circular shape. Its centre is formed by the dance floor and the large stage, surrounded by two concrete bars.The upper level features a curved gallery.

Despite the predominant use of concrete, reminiscent of the club's earlier incarnation, wood was also increasingly used for the interior to give the club a warm atmosphere. Not only is the dancefloor made of wood, but also the wall panelling and floor-to-ceiling perforated, rotating slats. These can be adjusted to structure the space and dampen sound.

In keeping with the rather minimalist décor, no sponsor or advertising logos can be seen in the club or on its inventory.

== Other Business Activities ==
Between 1992 and 1997 the Mojo Club ran two fashion stores in Hamburg named “Mojo – The Shop”.

The club sells its own-brand "Mojo Cola".

The record label Universal Records launched a sampler collection with the title “Mojo Club Presents Dancefloor Jazz”, of which 12 volumes were published between 1992 and 2005; volume 13 was published in 2008 by Edel Records.

== Discography ==
The Mojo Club's most important exports were its music compilations, which were released on CD and vinyl from 1992. Since the first edition, the samplers of soul, jazz, bossa nova, disco and funk compiled by Oliver Korthals have enjoyed great popularity.

Dancefloor Jazz 1992-2008

The record label Universal Records released a sampler series entitled Mojo Club Presents Dancefloor Jazz, of which a total of twelve volumes were released between 1992 and 2005; volume 13 was released by Edel Records in 2008. In 2013, the Mojo Club Presents Dancefloor Jazz compilations were re-released by Universal as a limited vinyl edition. The concert recording "Joyce Live at the Mojo Club" can be musically classified as a dancefloor jazz release.

Electric Mojo, Remix Albums 1997-2008

The two series Electric Mojo and The Remix Album, as well as the recordings by Michael Sauer, Pulser SG and Rogue Soul can be allocated to the breakbeat-oriented club series Electric Mojo.

The Mojo Club Sessions - from 2014

This series, released in cooperation with Edel Records, features purely analogue recordings. From the microphones to the recording on Studer or Nagra tape machines, to the mastering and cutting of the music signal into the lacquer film, digital aids are dispensed with. The recordings for this series are mixed directly onto the two stereo tracks on location and during the creation of the music from up to 18 channels. They are released on record only.

- Mojo Club presents Dancefloor Jazz (1992) CD, LP
- Mojo Club presents Dancefloor Jazz, Vol. 2 „For What It's Worth“ (1993) CD, LP
- Mojo Club presents Dancefloor Jazz, Vol. 3 „Work To Do“ (1994) CD, 2LP
- Mojo Club presents Dancefloor Jazz, Vol. 4 „Light My Fire“ (1995) CD, LP
- Joyce „Joyce Live At The Mojo Club“ (1995) CD, LP
- Mojo Club presents Dancefloor Jazz, Vol. 5 „Sunshine Of Your Love“ (1996) CD, 2LP
- Mojo Club presents Dancefloor Jazz, Vol. 6 „Summer In The City“ (1997) CD, LP
- Electric Mojo, Vol. 1 „The New Format Jazz Sessions“ (1997) CD, LP
- Electric Mojo, Vol. 2 „Are Friends Electric?“ (1998) CD, LP
- Mojo Club presents Dancefloor Jazz, Vol. 7 „Give Me Your Love“ (1998) CD, 2LP
- Mojo Club presents Dancefloor Jazz, Vol. 8 „Love The One You're With“ (1999) CD, 2LP
- The Remix Album(1999) CD, 2LP
- Mojo Club presents Dancefloor Jazz, Vol. 9 „Never Felt So Free“ (2000) CD, 2LP
- Mandarin, Vol. 1 "Chinese Chilling Thrills" (2000), CD
- Mojo Club presents Dancefloor Jazz, Vol. 10 „Love Power“ (2001) CD, 2CD, 3LP
- The Remix Album, Part 2(2001) CD, 2LP
- Michael Sauer vs. Phoneheads „Why And How“ (2001) CD Single
- Pulser SG „How Do you Want It“ (2001) CD Single
- Mojo Club presents Dancefloor Jazz, Vol. 11 „Right Now“ (2002) CD, 2LP
- Electric Mojo, Vol. 3 (2002) CD
- Mandarin, Vol. 2 "Wicked Wan Tan Tunes" (2002) CD, LP
- Mojo Club presents Dancefloor Jazz, Vol. 12 „Feeling Good“ (2005) CD, 2LP
- Mojo Club presents Dancefloor Jazz, Vol. 13 „If You Want My Love“ (2008) CD, 2LP
- Rogue Soul „Rogue Soul“ (2008) CD
- Shantel & Bucovina Club Orkestar - The Mojo Club Sessions (2014) 2LP
