= Dancing Towers =

Buildings in Hamburg, Germany

Coordinates: 53.5496°N 9.9682°E

- Tanzende Türme
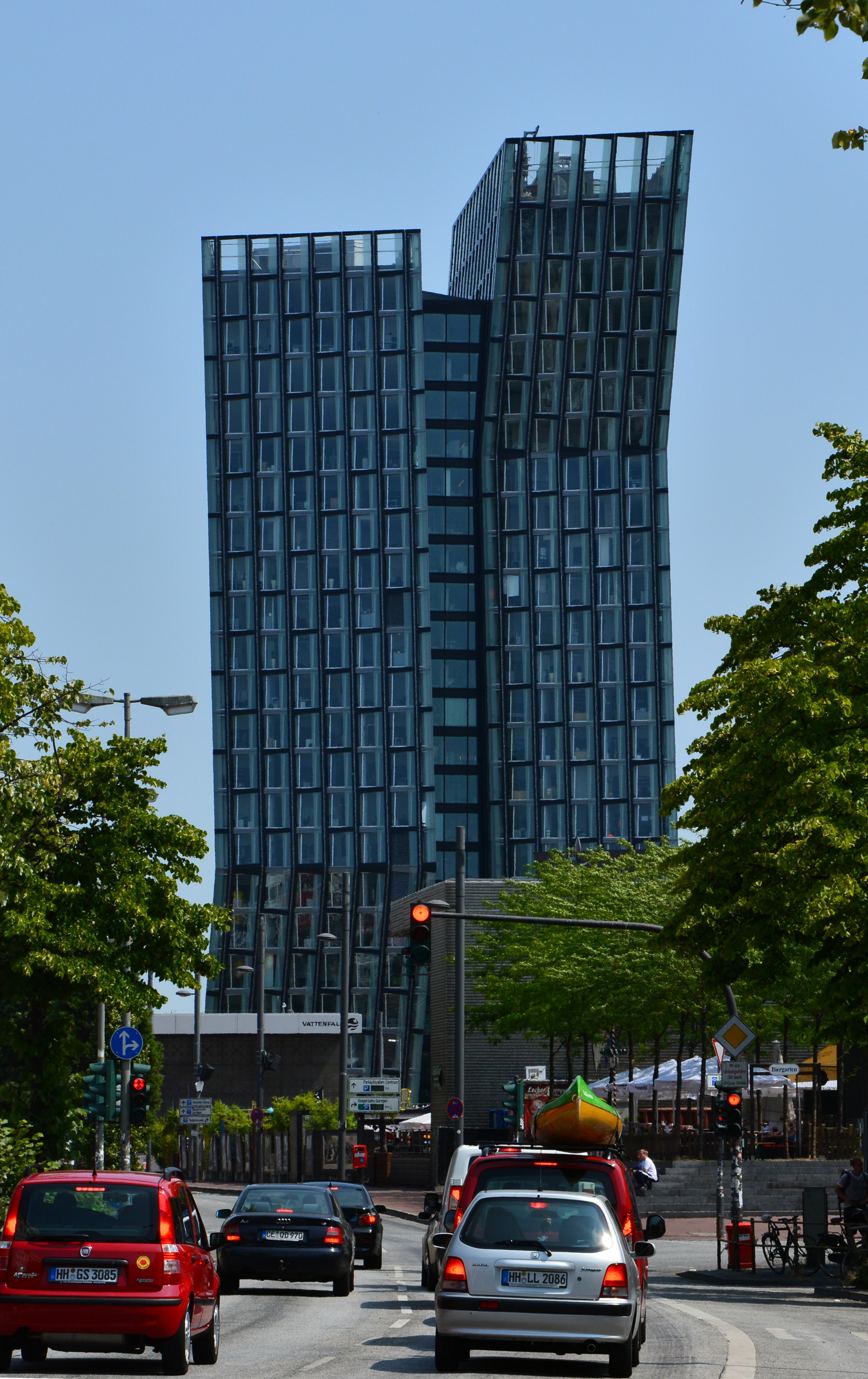
- The Dancing Towers in 2013
- Interactive map of the Dancing Towers area

General information
- Location: 1 Reeperbahn, St. Pauli, Hamburg, Germany
- Opened: 2012
- Cost: €180 million

Height
- Height: 85 m (279 ft)

Design and construction
- Architecture firm: BRT Architects
- Main contractor: Ed.Züblin AG

The Dancing Towers (German: Tanzende Türme, sometimes also Tango-Türme, transl. Tango Towers) are two highrises at the eastern end of Reeperbahn, in St. Pauli, Hamburg, Germany. Designed by BRT Architects of Hadi Teherani and funded by Strabag, they were completed in 2012. Inside the buildings, office space, gastronomy, a radio station, as well as music club and live venue the Mojo Club can be found. The Mojo Club had been located here before, in the pile of a former bowling alley which was standing empty for years, then being demolished.

== Location ==
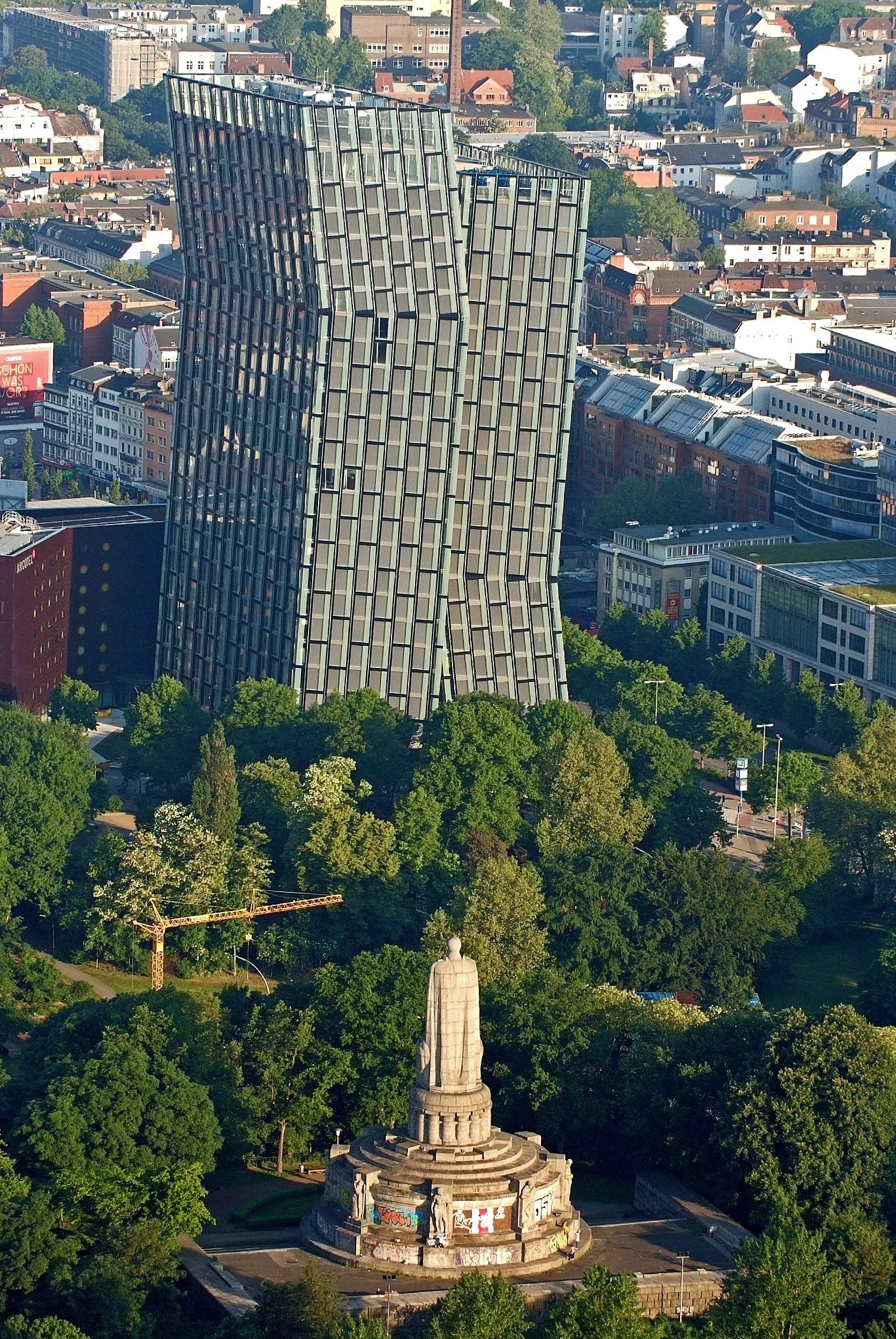
Aerial view of the Dancing Towers, Bismarck Monument to the foreground

The buildings at 1, Reeperbahn are located in a triangle of the streets of Reeperbahn, Zirkusweg and Beim Trichter near the area of former Hamburg city walls (Wallanlagen, today part of Hamburg Wallring). Nearby the square of Spielbudenplatz and St. Pauli station as well as Heiligengeistfeld are located.

== Architecture ==
The height of the two towers with the significant kink is 85 and 75 metres. They are the result of a winning design of an architectural competition. The building was erected by Ed.Züblin AG. The two towers symbolize a couple dancing Tango. The amount to be invested was around €180 million.
