= Millerntor-Stadion =

Stadium in Hamburg, Germany

Millerntor
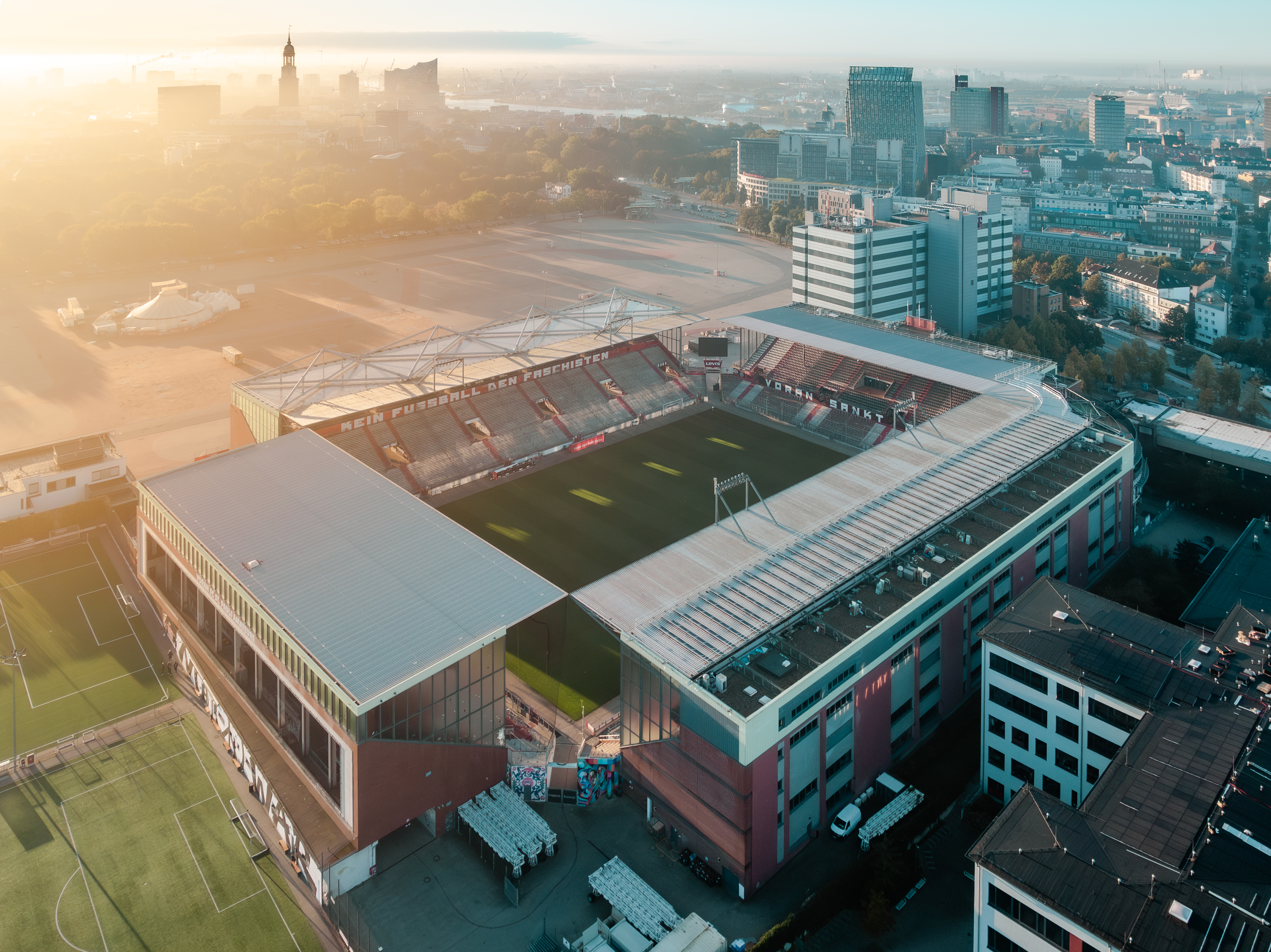
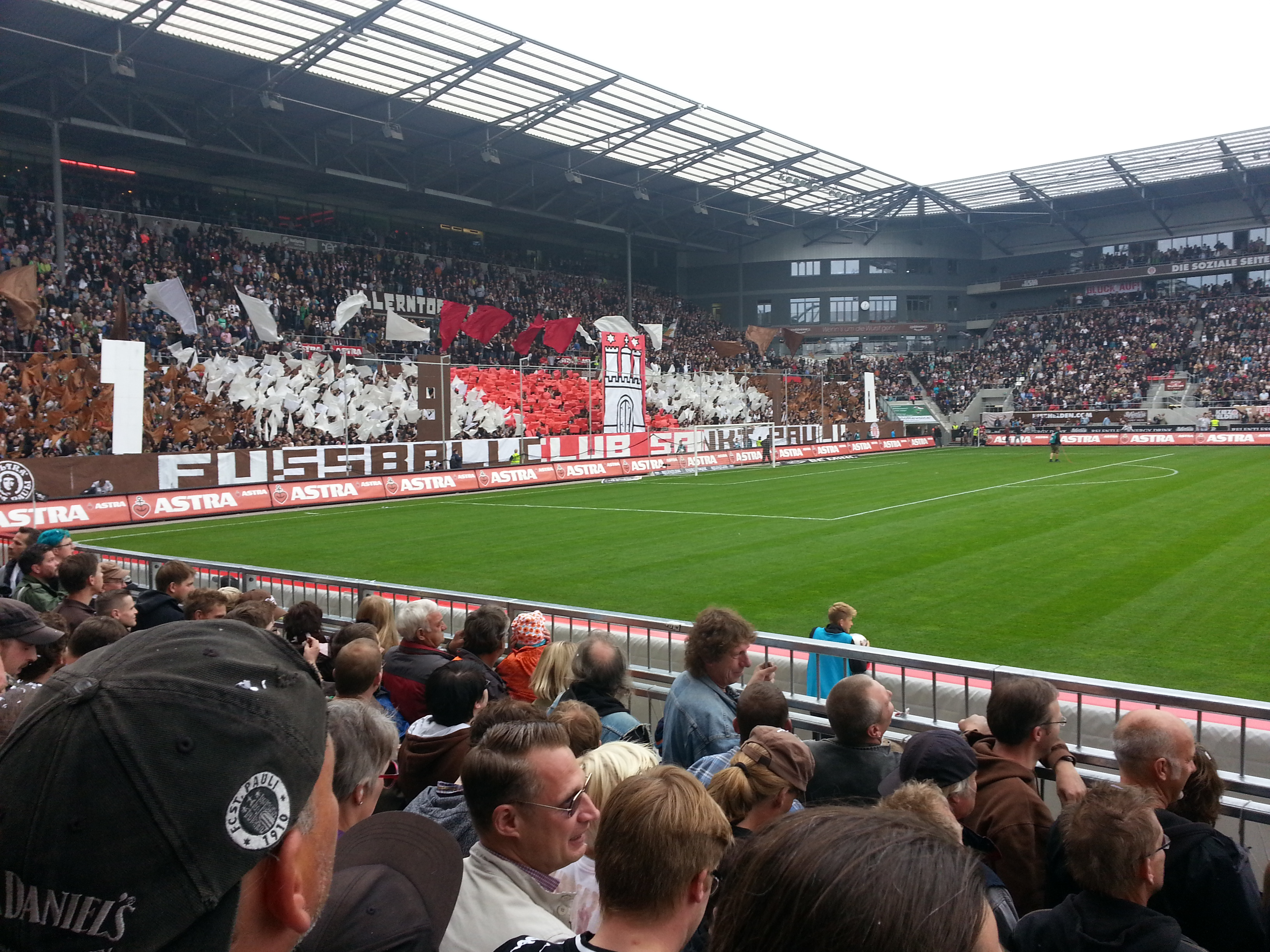
- Interactive map of Millerntor
- Former names: Wilhelm-Koch-Stadion (1970–1998)
- Location: St. Pauli, Hamburg-Mitte, Hamburg, Germany
- Coordinates: 53°33′16.5″N 9°58′3.6″E
- Owner: FC St. Pauli
- Operator: Millerntorstadion Betriebs-GmbH und Co. KG
- Capacity: 29,546 (League Matches)
- Executive suites: 39
- Surface: Grass
- Record attendance: 29,546 (FC St. Pauli - Arminia Bielefeld, 25 July 2015)
- Field size: 105 m × 68 m
- Public transit: St. Pauli, Feldstrasse

Construction
- Groundbreaking: 1961
- Opened: 1963
- Renovated: 1988
- Expanded: 2006–2015
- Cost: €55 million (2006–2015)
- Architects: agn Niederberghaus & Partner GmbH, ar.te.plan GmbH (Reconstruction)
- Main contractor: Walter Hellmich GmbH

Tenant
- FC St. Pauli (1963–present)

Millerntor-Stadion (German pronunciation: [ˈmɪlɐntoːɐ̯ˌʃtaːdi̯ɔn]) is a multi-purpose stadium in the St. Pauli area of Hamburg, Germany. Best known as the home ground of football club FC St. Pauli, it is on the Heiligengeistfeld near the Reeperbahn, the red light district of Hamburg. The stadium had a capacity of 32,000 when it was built in 1961. It is also used by the Blue Devils American football team, and as a concert venue, including a performance by Prince in 1988. FC St. Pauli celebrated their centenary festival at the stadium in 2010.

== History ==
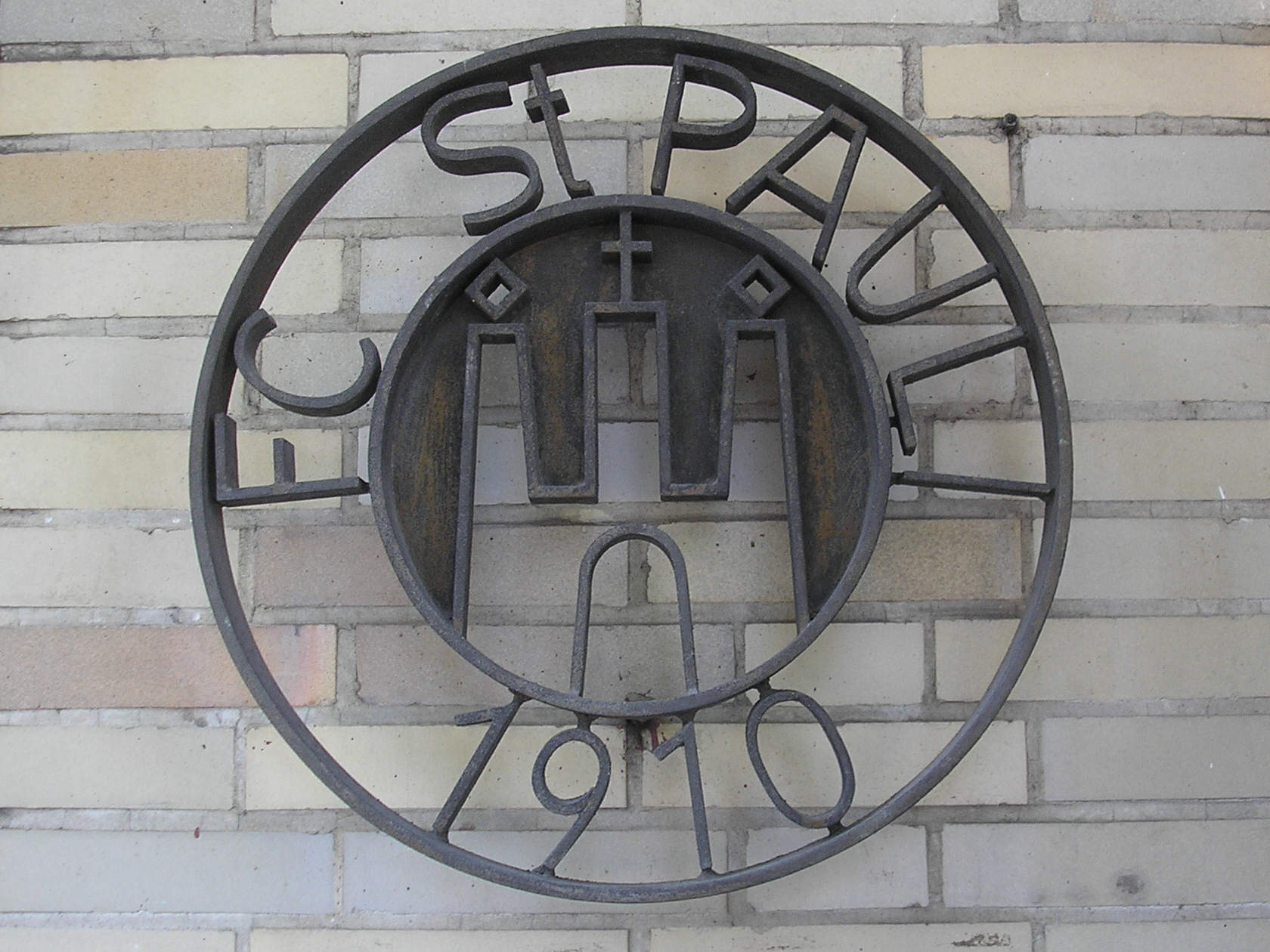
The club logo outside the Millerntor-Stadion in 2007.

The first sports ground at the Heiligengeistfeld was created after the First World War as a simple flat space. This was the home ground of the St. Pauli TV, together with other workers sports associations (Arbeitersportkartells).

In 1946, the club (now called FC St. Pauli) built its own stadium partially on the original site of Hamburg Observatory, built in 1802 by Johann Georg Repsold and moved to Bergedorf in 1912. The stadium was located on the Heiligengeistfeld, opposite to the old firestation and in the corner between Glacischaussee and Budapester strasse (during 1946 to 1956 named Ernst Thälmann strasse).

In a city laid to ruins by the Second World War, the stadium was made possible only with the help from fans and club members. However, the stadium was not to last long as it had to be removed in 1961. This was due to the IGA (International Garden exposition) 1963 in Hamburg and parts of the park Planten un Blomen was constructed at the site. (The site is today used by the northern entrance of the U Bahn-station St. Pauli.)

As a result, the club had to find a new stadium and so in 1961 the construction of the Millerntor-Stadion started. The new stadium opened in 1963, delayed by of an initial lack of drainage system, which made the pitch unplayable after rain. The new stadium held 32,000 spectators, but the capacity was later reduced to 20,629 for safety reasons.

The Millerntor-Stadion has undergone numerous modifications over the years, the biggest change was the construction of a temporary seating area above the Back straight, allowing the promotion into the Bundesliga 1988. This temporary area was in use until May 2012 when the entire Back straight was demolished.

In the end of the 1980s, plans for a new stadium, the so-called Sport-Dome were blocked by supporters of the club and residents. The Sport-Dome would have become a state of the art all-seater stadium that would have combined sport facilities with a shopping mall and a hotel. The fans protested against the commercialization of their stadium and there were also fears that the Sport-Dome would have led to higher rents in the neighbourhood.

In the 1990s, the chairman of the club, the architect Heinz Weisener, made new plans, but they too collapsed, this time due to the financial situation of the club. The question of a new stadium looked like a never-ending story and every chairman has made their own plans.

== Redevelopment 2006–2015 ==
In December 2006, the South Stand was demolished after the game versus Wuppertal. This caused the capacity to be reduced to 15,600 people. Due to some issues caused by mismanagement of the redevelopment project, the building of the new stand on this side of the ground was heavily delayed, and some fans cynically referred to the now empty side of the ground as the "Littman hole", referring to the controversial club chairman Corny Littmann held responsible for the delay. Eventually construction of the new South Stand began in Spring 2007.

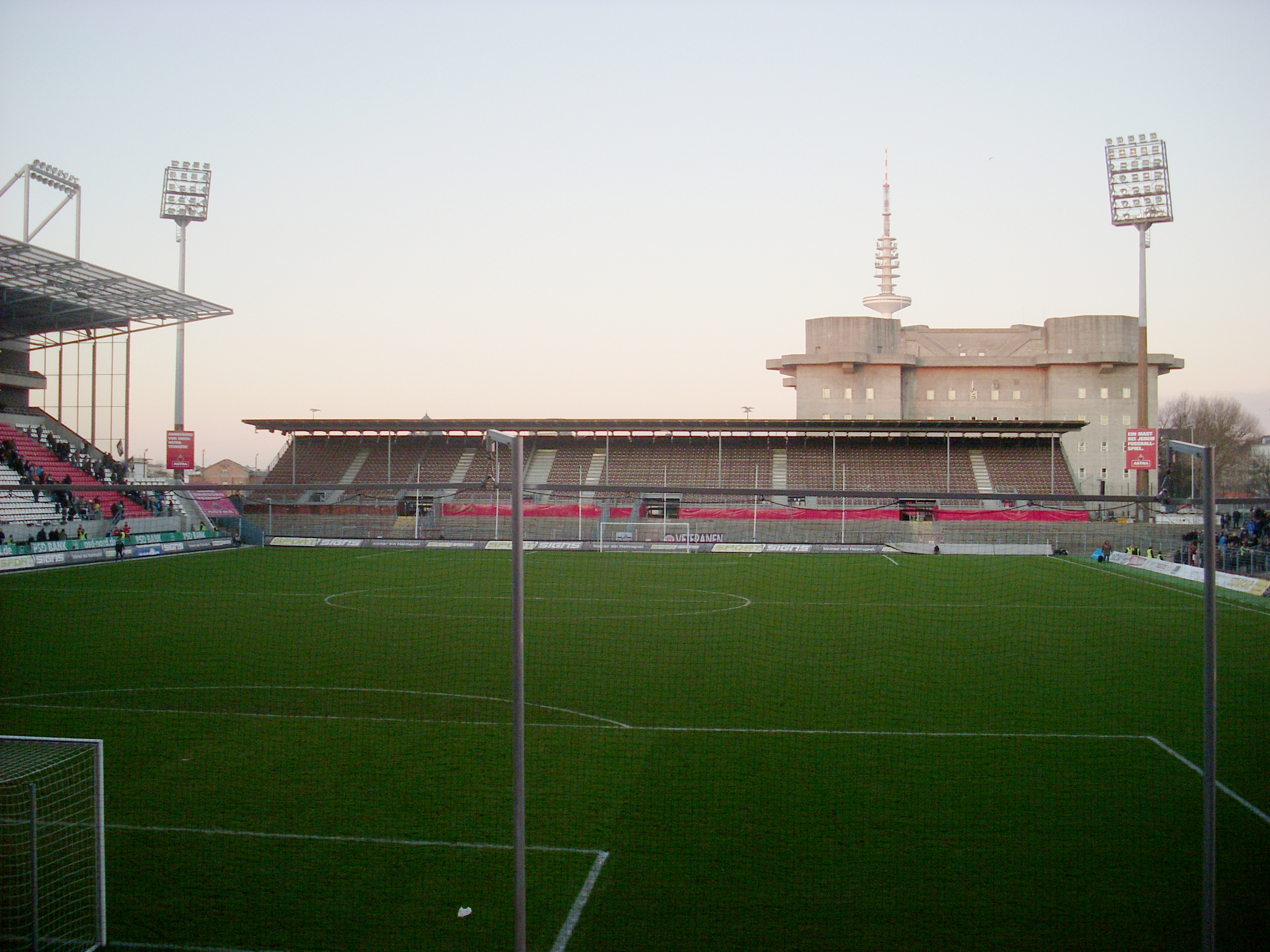
The North stand in 2012.

With the new South Stand completed and a new temporary seating area above the North Stand, the capacity was increased to 22,648. With the first phase of the redevelopment completed, the club also ensure that the club fulfilled the ground grading requirements for a licence from the DFL, including the installation of under-soil heating. In addition, the iconic old manually operated scoreboard was, for many fans lamentably, replaced by a more modern new digital display screen.

After the completion of the new South Stand, the Main Stand was demolished in mid-November 2009. The new all-seater Main Stand was completed in time for the start of the 2010–2011 season, with the capacity of the Millerntor-Stadium rising to 24,487 spectators.

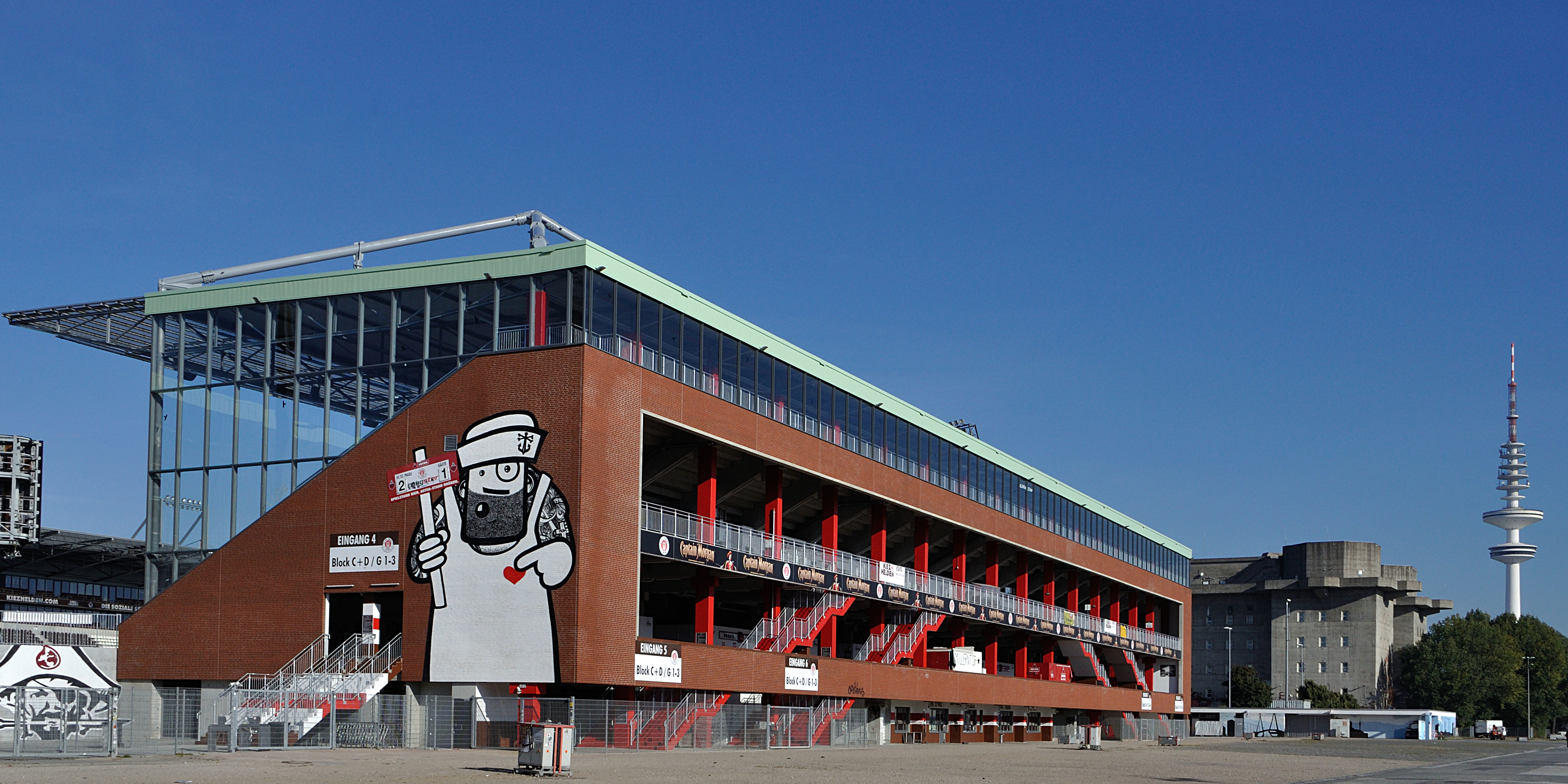
The new Gegengerade in 2013.

The redevelopment of the Gegengerade (lit. Far side) started in January 2012 with the building of a new subway under the Heiligengeistfeld. Two heavy air-dropped bombs from the Second World War, weighing approximately 250-500 kilograms, were found in the middle of the Heiligengeistfeld during the exploratory works.

Two different designs for the new Gegengerade had been mooted during the autumn of 2011: "The Wave", an elaborate curvaceous design, or a more conventional design more in keeping with the rest of the redeveloped stadium. "The Wave" came from collaboration between the engineering firm OSD and the Hamburg-based Interpol +- outfit. The proposed stand was to have measured 27 meters in height, with a total capacity of 14,000 spectators (3,000 seated). In the end, FC St. Pauli announced in November 2011, after extensive consultation with supporters, they would build the more conventional design with the red brick facade, designed by the Dortmund-based architect bureau art.te.plan GmbH. The reasons given for the decision were safety, construction time, the more sympathetic architectural style and cost. With a price possibly as high as €21m, "The Wave" would have taken up almost the entire budget for the reconstruction of the Gegengerade, the North stand and the new training facilities combined.

The new completed Gegengerade has a total capacity of 13,199, with standing room for 10,126 spectators in the paddock and 3,030 seats in the upper tier. At the top of the stand there will still be 27 seats for media and commentators, as well as 16 seats for the visually impaired and their accompanying helpers.

The old Gegengerade was demolished after the game against SC Paderborn in May 2012, and the main contractor for the construction of the new Gegengerade was Walter Hellmich GmbH.

With the new Gegengerade completed, the capacity of the Millerntor-Stadion rose to 29,063 at the beginning of 2013. The final phase of the planned redevelopment program is the North stand. The demolition of the North stand came into full swing after the 2014–15 DFB-Pokal match against Borussia Dortmund at end of October 2014. When the North stand is fully demolished, the ground will be analyzed and searched for undetonated bombs and then the reconstruction will start.

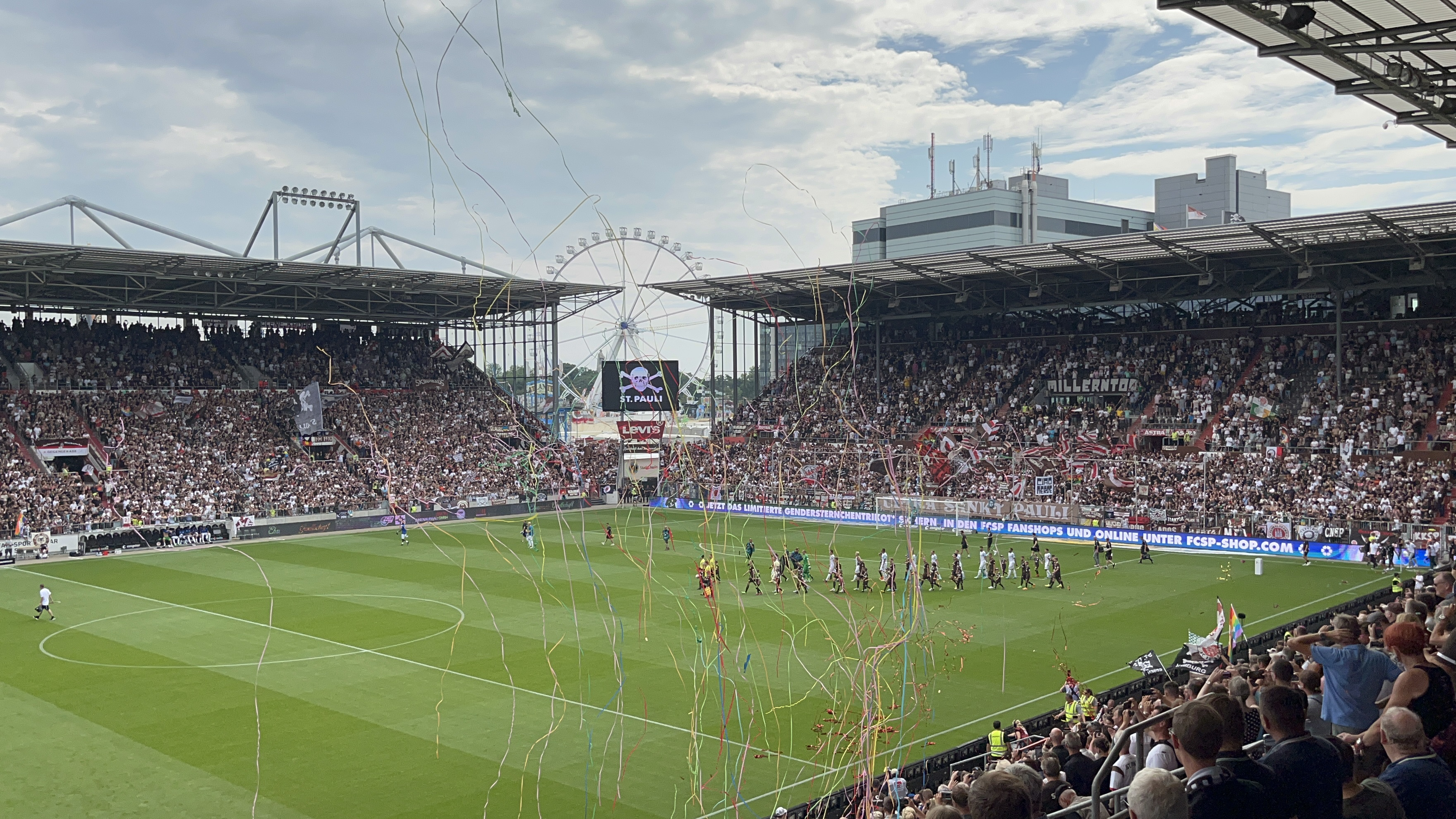
The Millerntor Stadium in 2022 before a game between FC St. Pauli and 1. FC Magdeburg

When the redevelopment work at the ground is completed, the capacity of the ground is expected to rise to approximately 30,000 spectators.

== Capacity ==
As of July 2015 the stadium is permitted for a capacity of 29,546 spectators of which 16,940 are standing and 12,606 are seated. The seating capacity includes seats for media and commentators, seats for impaired, business seats and seats in the 39 suites.

The suites are officially known as "Séparées". This is made with a humoristic reference to the "Chambres Séparées" used by the sex workers at the nearby Red Light District around Reeperbahn.

== Location ==
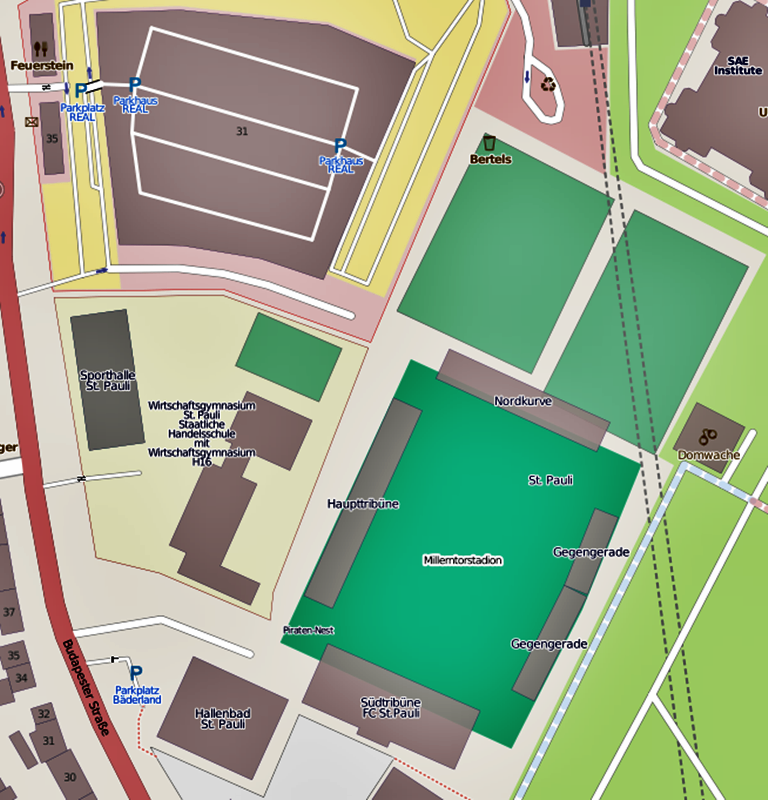
A map of the surrounding area.

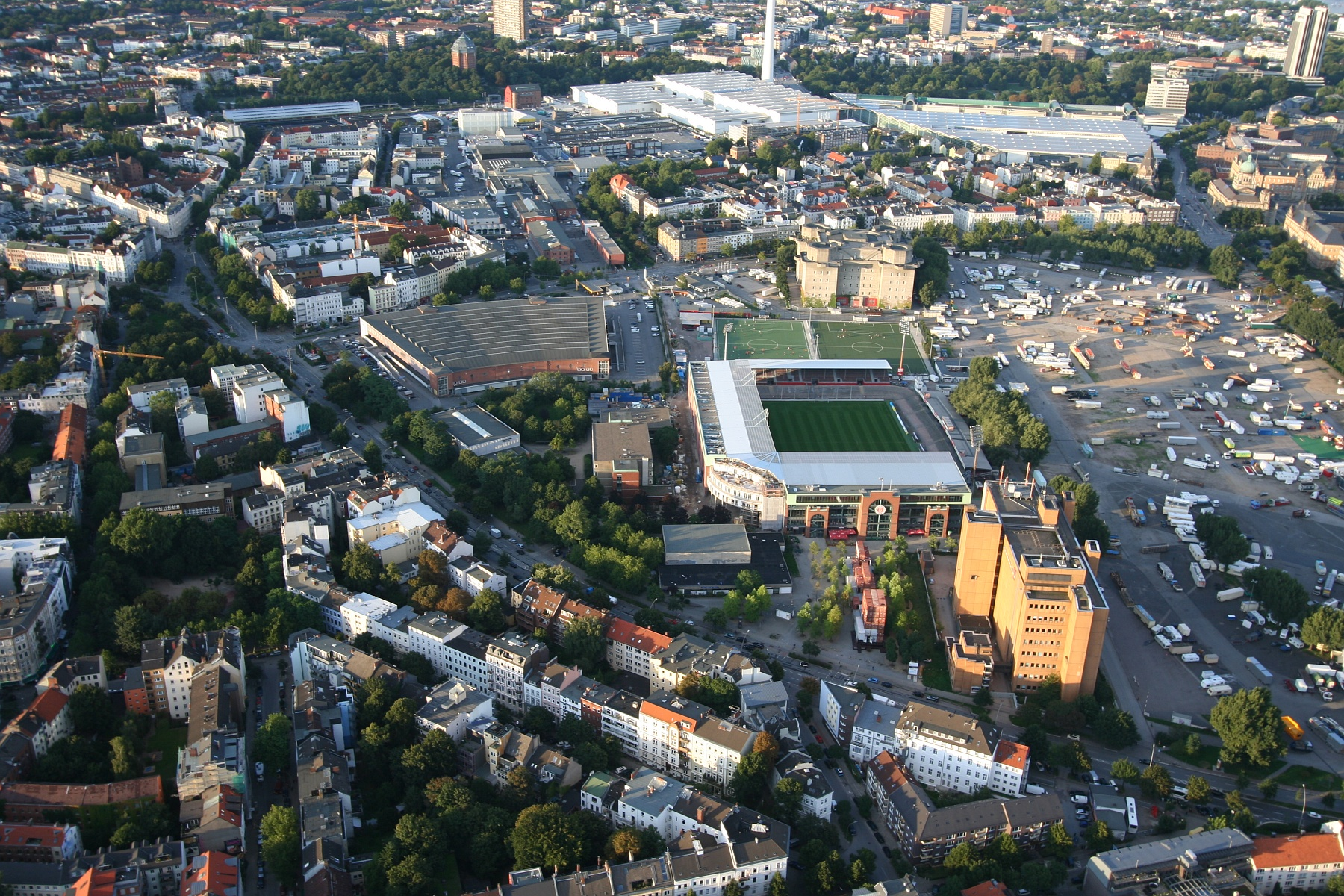
The surrounding area seen in 2010.

== Name ==
The name Millerntor is derived from the Millers Gate, one of the gates permitting entry through the city wall that surrounded the Free and Hanseatic City of Hamburg. The area now constituting modern St. Pauli was located outside the city wall, on the no man's land between Hamburg and the Danish city of Altona.

From 1970 to 1998, the Millerntor-Stadion was known as Wilhelm-Koch-Stadion. It was renamed Millerntor-Stadion by the club members because its namesake Wilhelm Koch had been a member of the NSDAP. In 2007 the club members decided that there would be no commercial use of the name.

== Gallery ==
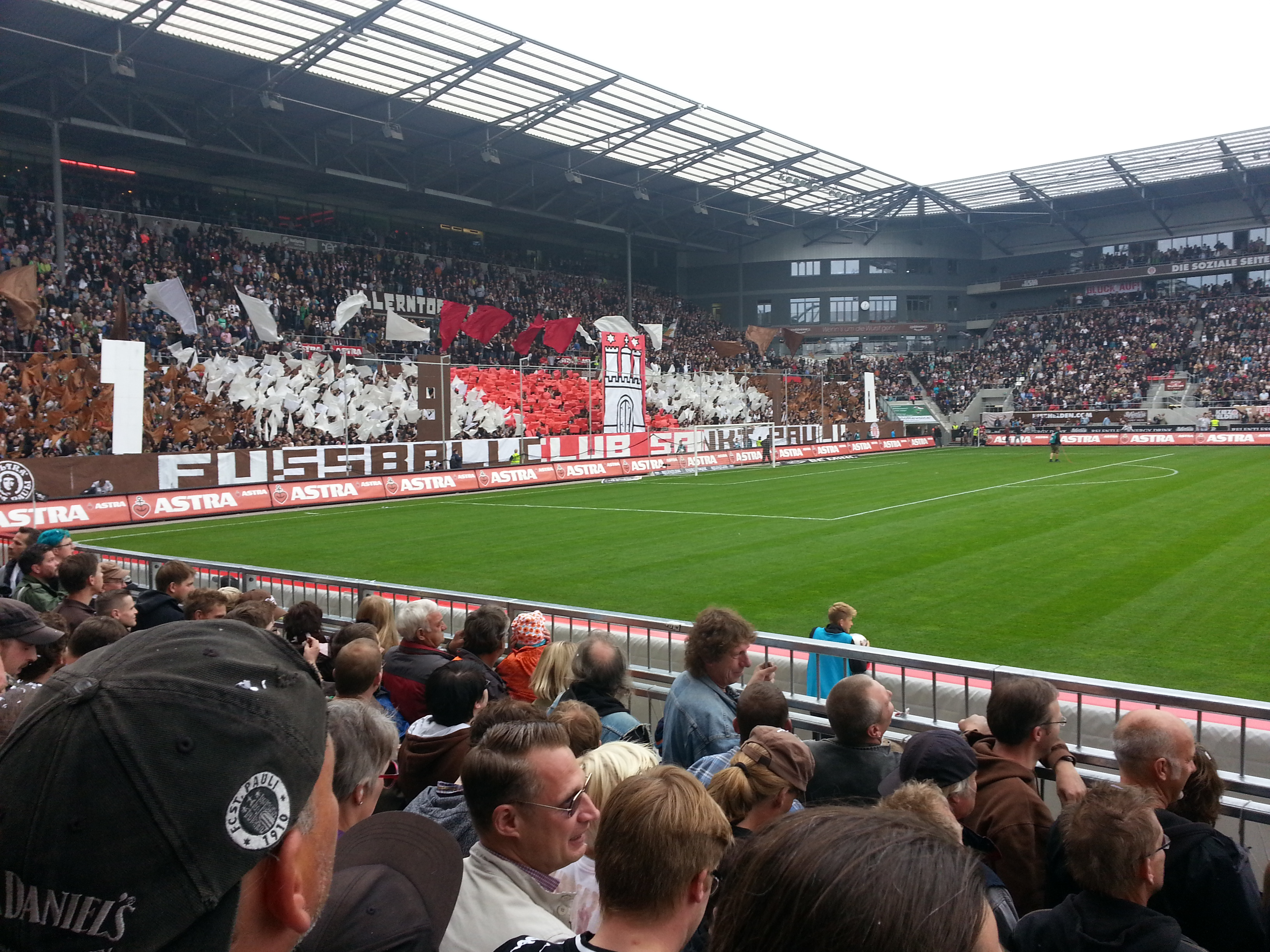
The match FC St. Pauli - FSV Frankfurt in 2013, view from the new Gegengerade.

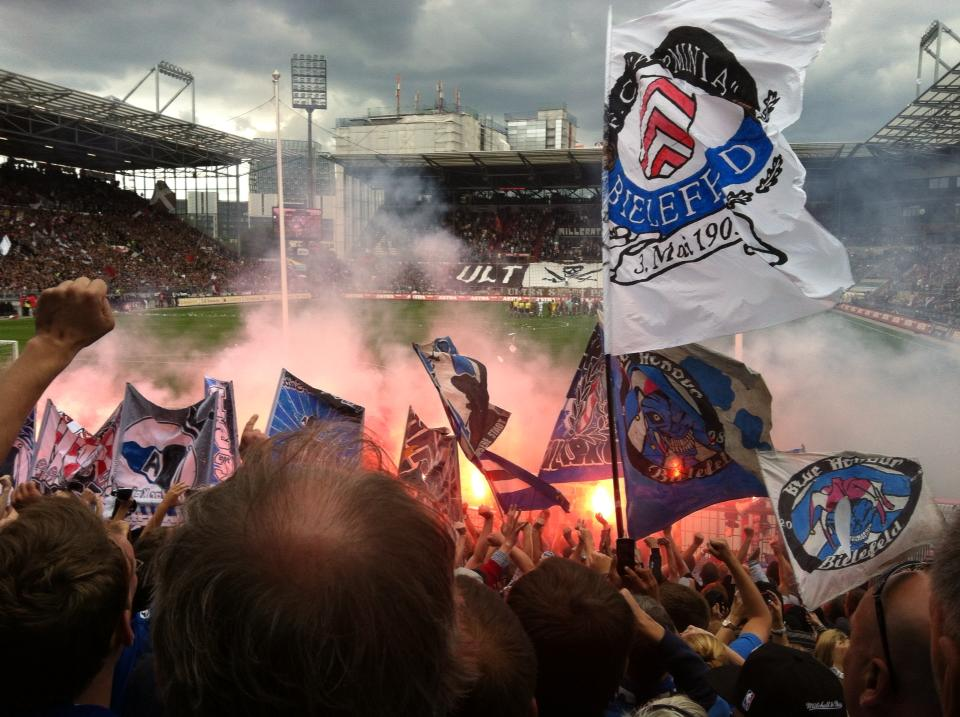
The match FC St. Pauli - DSC Arminia Bielefeld in 2013, view from the old North stand.

== Panorama ==
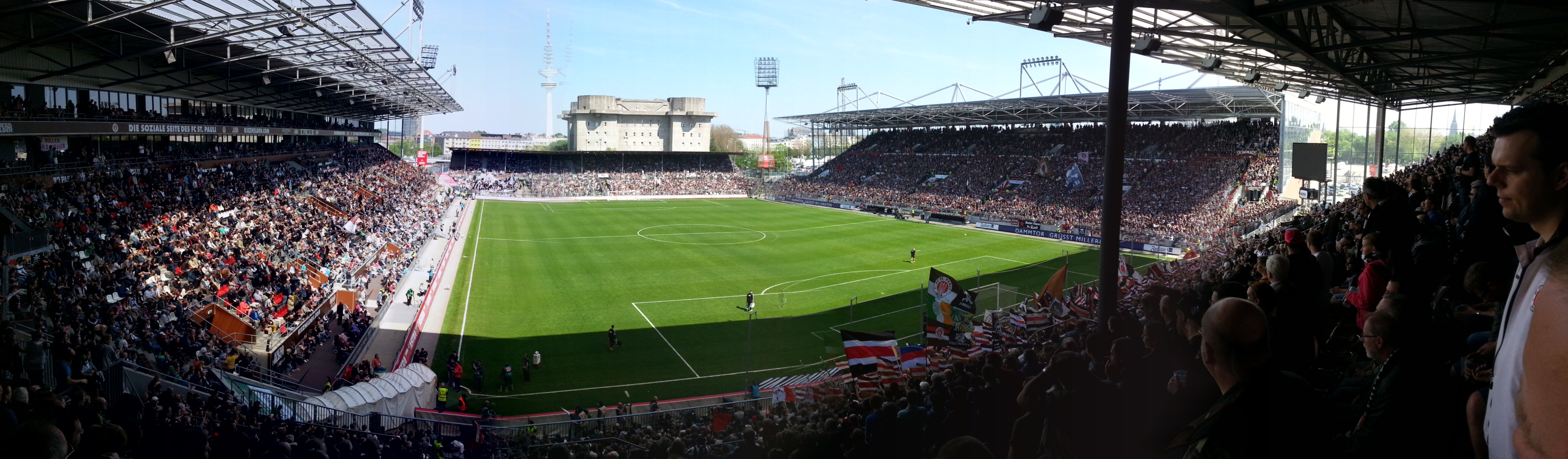
Millerntor-Stadion panorama in 2014, view from the South Stand.

== See also ==
- List of football stadiums in Germany
- Lists of stadiums
