= Feldstraße station =

Railway station in Hamburg, Germany

Feldstraße
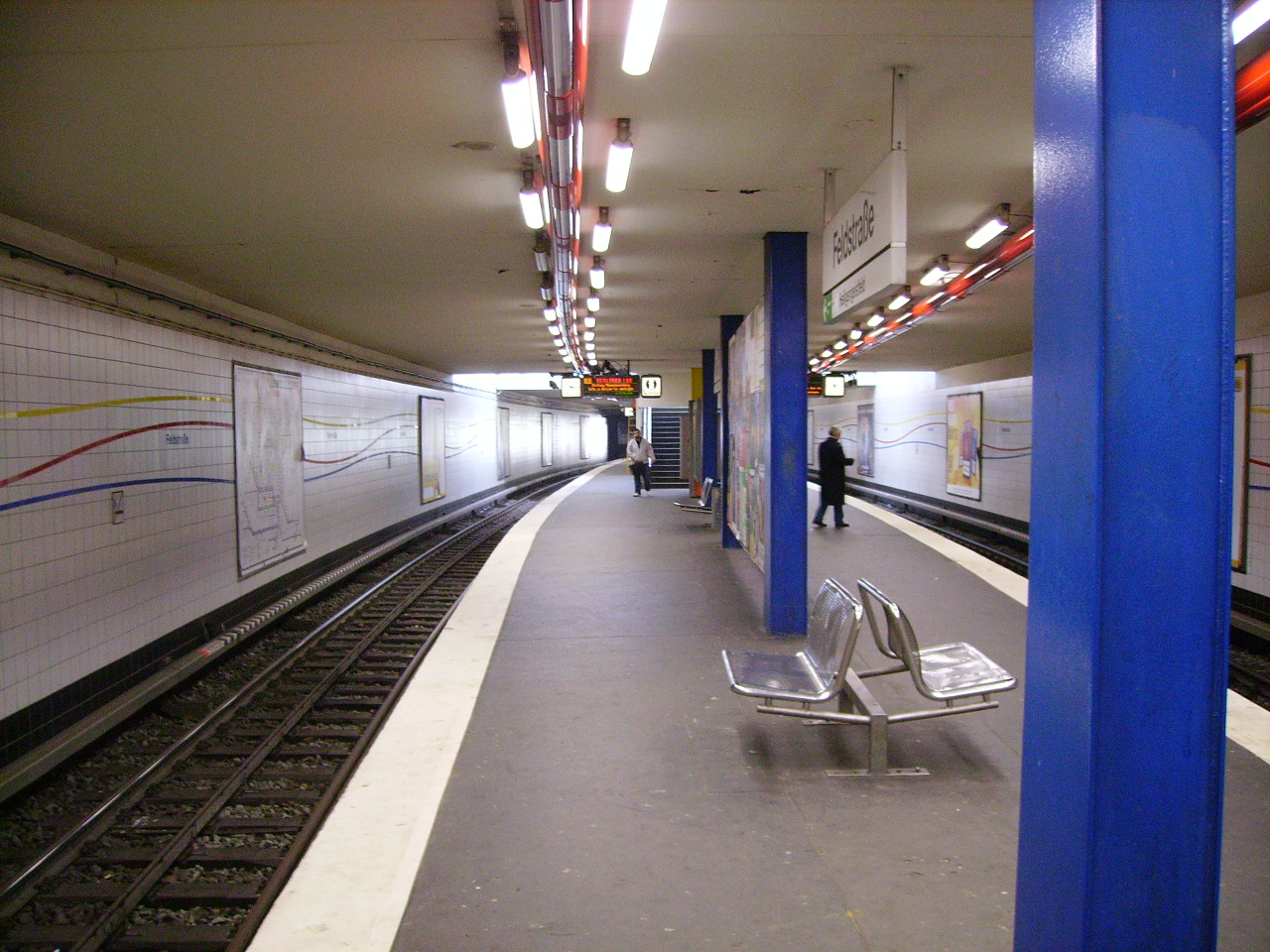

General information
- Location: Feldstraße; 20359 Hamburg, Germany
- Coordinates: 53°33′25″N 09°58′07″E
- System: Hamburg U-Bahn station
- Operator: Hamburger Hochbahn AG
- Line: U3
- Platforms: 1 island platform
- Tracks: 2

Construction
- Structure type: Underground
- Accessible: Yes

Other information
- Station code: HHA: FE
- Fare zone: HVV: A/000 and 101

History
- Opened: 25 May 1912
- Rebuilt: 1955

Services
Preceding station	Hamburg U-Bahn	Following station
Sternschanze towards Barmbek	U3	St. Pauli towards Wandsbek-Gartenstadt
Location
- Location within Hamburg Location within Schleswig-Holstein Location within Germany Location within Europe

Feldstraße station is a metro station located in St. Pauli, Hamburg, Germany. It is served by Hamburg U-Bahn line U3 (Ring line); the station handles an average of around 14,000 passengers per day.

== Layout ==
Feldstraße station is located between Feldstraße to the north, and Heiligengeistfeld to the south. The station is often used by passengers travelling to the Hamburger Dom fair at Heiligengeistfeld, as it is located close to its northern entrance.

== Service ==
Feldstraße is served by Hamburg U-Bahn line U3; departures are every 5 minutes.

== Gallery ==
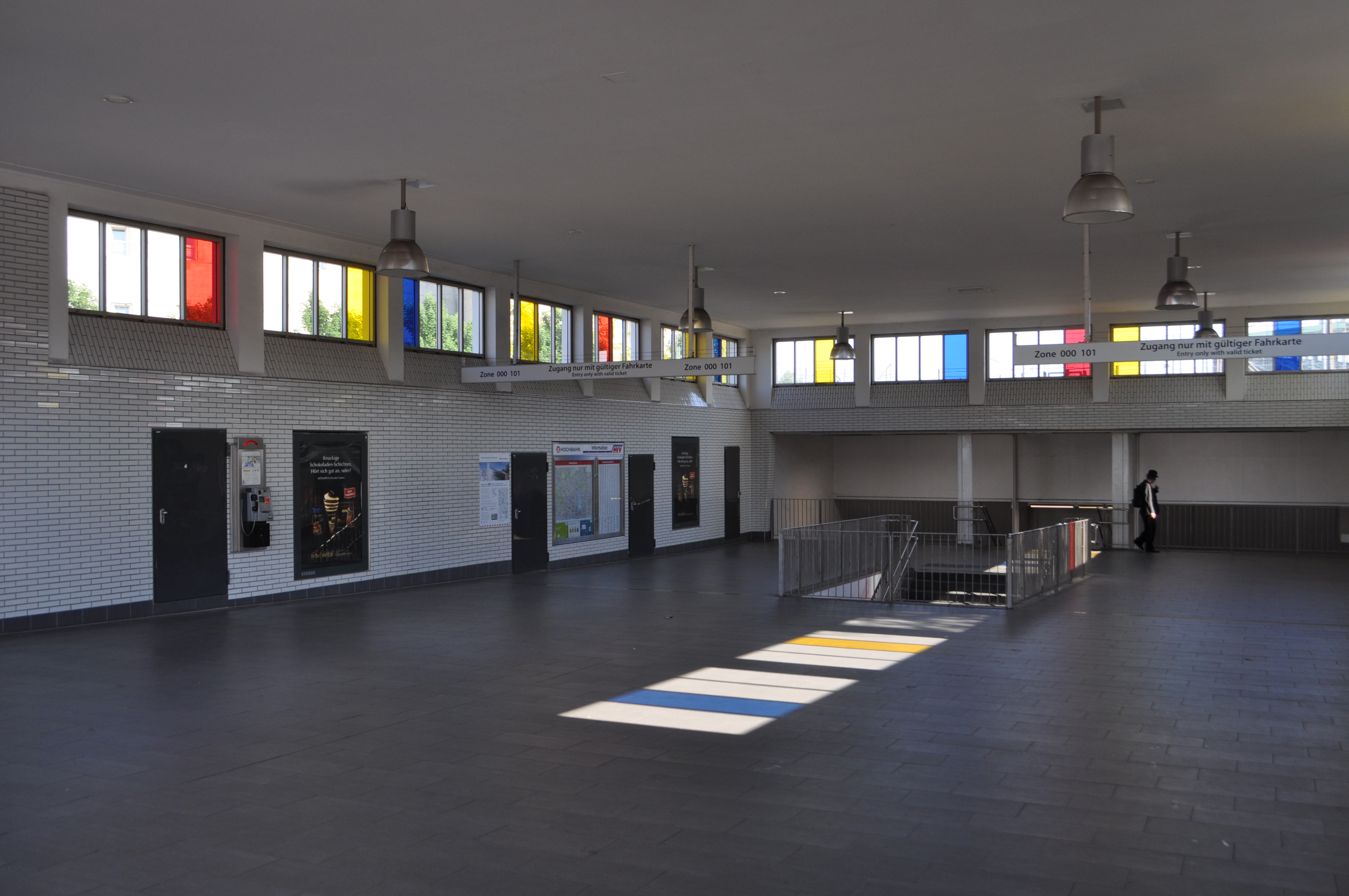
The station's ticket hall

== See also ==
- List of Hamburg U-Bahn stations
