= Kranhaus =

Architectural structure in Germany

Coordinates: 50.926417°N 6.96625°E

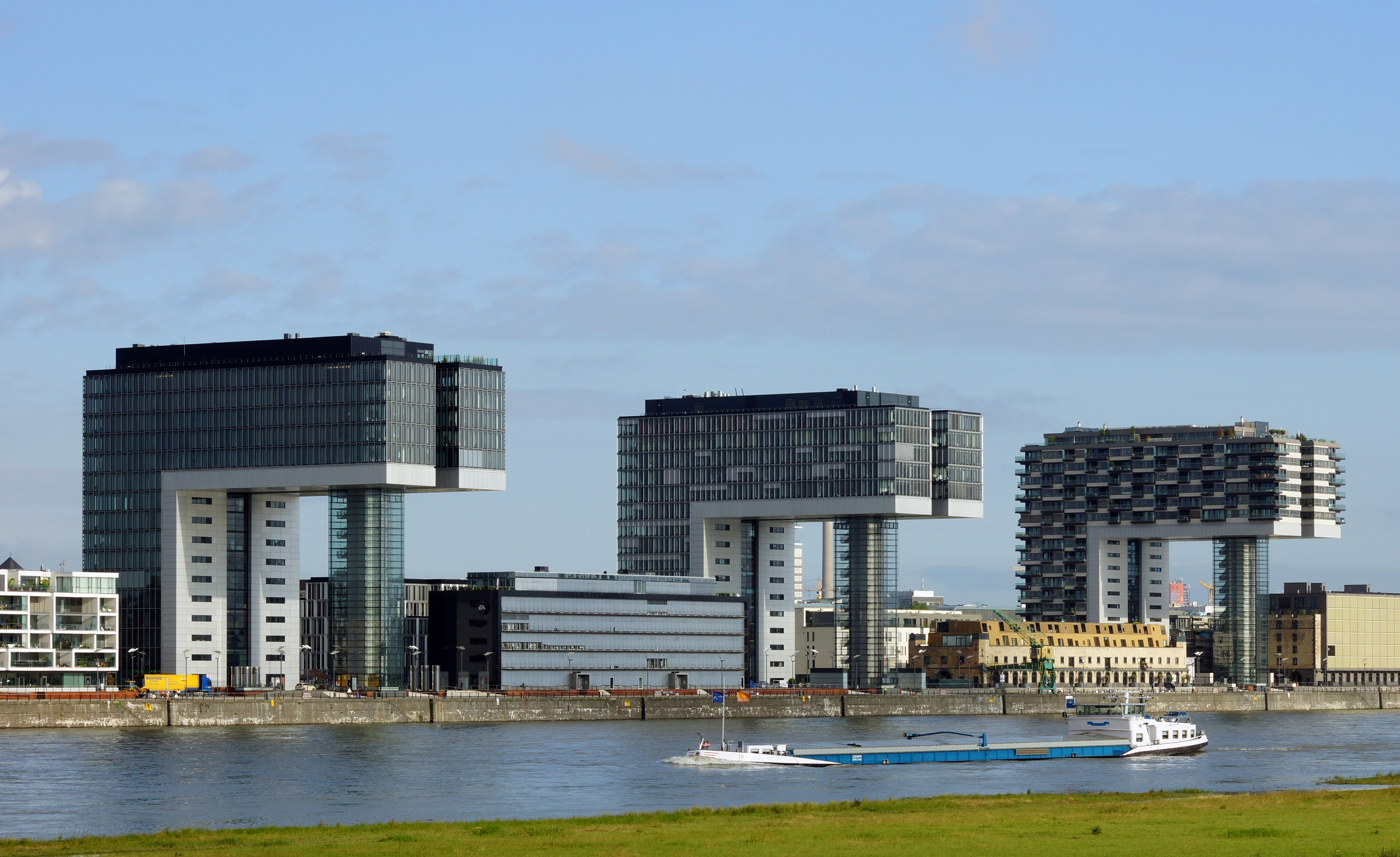
Kranhäuser viewed from the Rhine: Kranhaus Süd ("south"), Kranhaus Eins ("one") and Kranhaus Nord ("north")

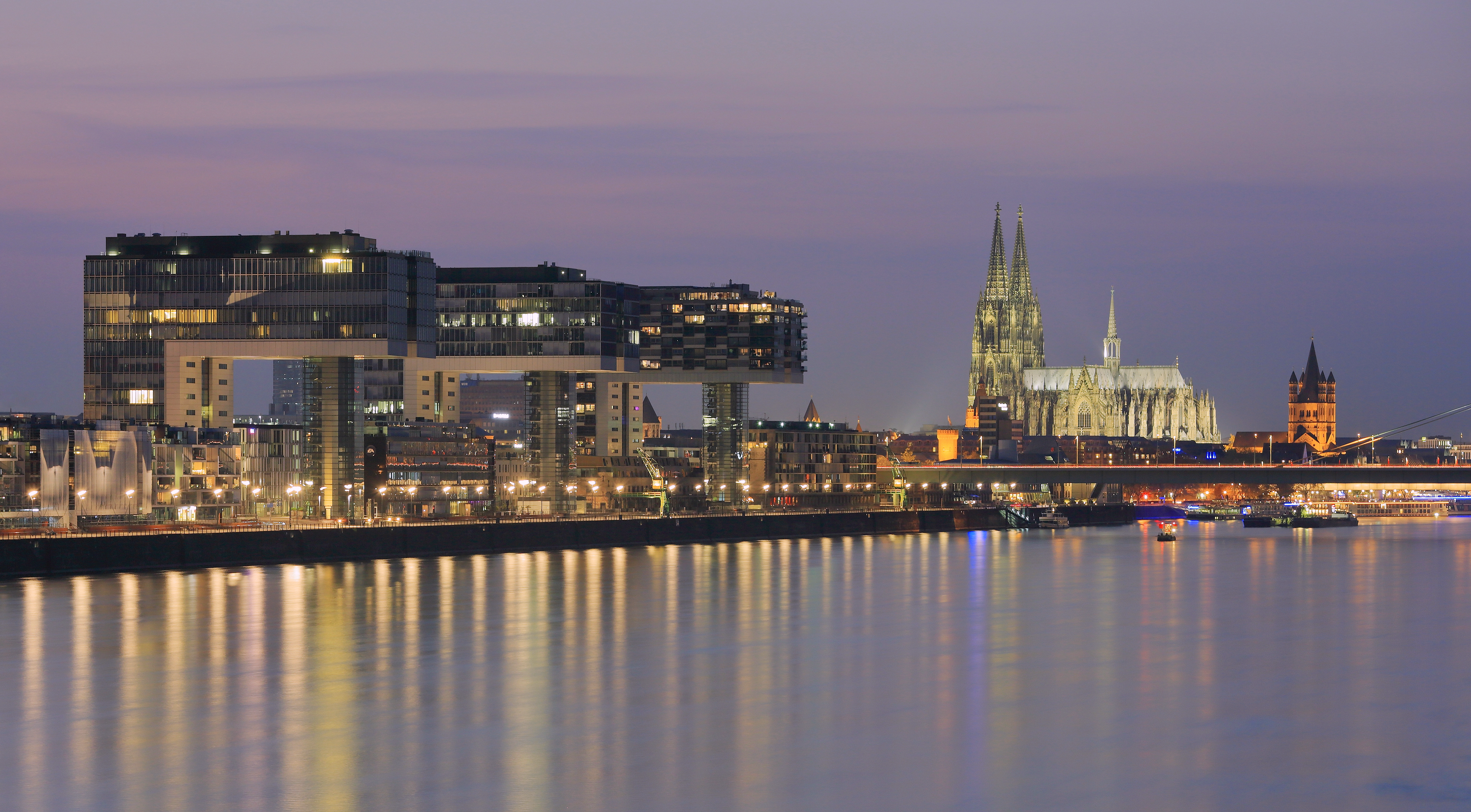
The buildings at night

A Kranhaus ("crane house") is one of three 17-story buildings, collectively Kranhäuser, in the Rheinauhafen of Cologne, Germany. Their shape, an upside-down "L", is reminiscent of the harbor cranes that were used to load cargo from and onto ships, two of which were left standing as monuments when the harbor was redesigned as a residential and commercial quarter in the early 2000s. Each building is about 62 m (203 ft) high, 70.2 m (230 ft) long, and 33.75 m (110.7 ft) wide. They were designed by Aachen architect Alfons Linster and Hamburg-based Hadi Teherani of BRT Architekten. Construction began on 16 October 2006, and the first building was completed in 2008.

The southern and middle buildings provide approx. 16,000 m^{2} (170,000 ft^{2}) of office space each, on 15 levels. The northern one harbors 133 luxury apartments totalling about 15,000 m^{2} (160,000 ft^{2}) on 18 levels.

== Award ==
The middle building, Kranhaus Eins, was given the MIPIM Award 2009 in the Business Centre category at the MIPIM in Cannes on 12 March 2009.
