= St. Pauli station =

Railway station in Hamburg, Germany

St. Pauli
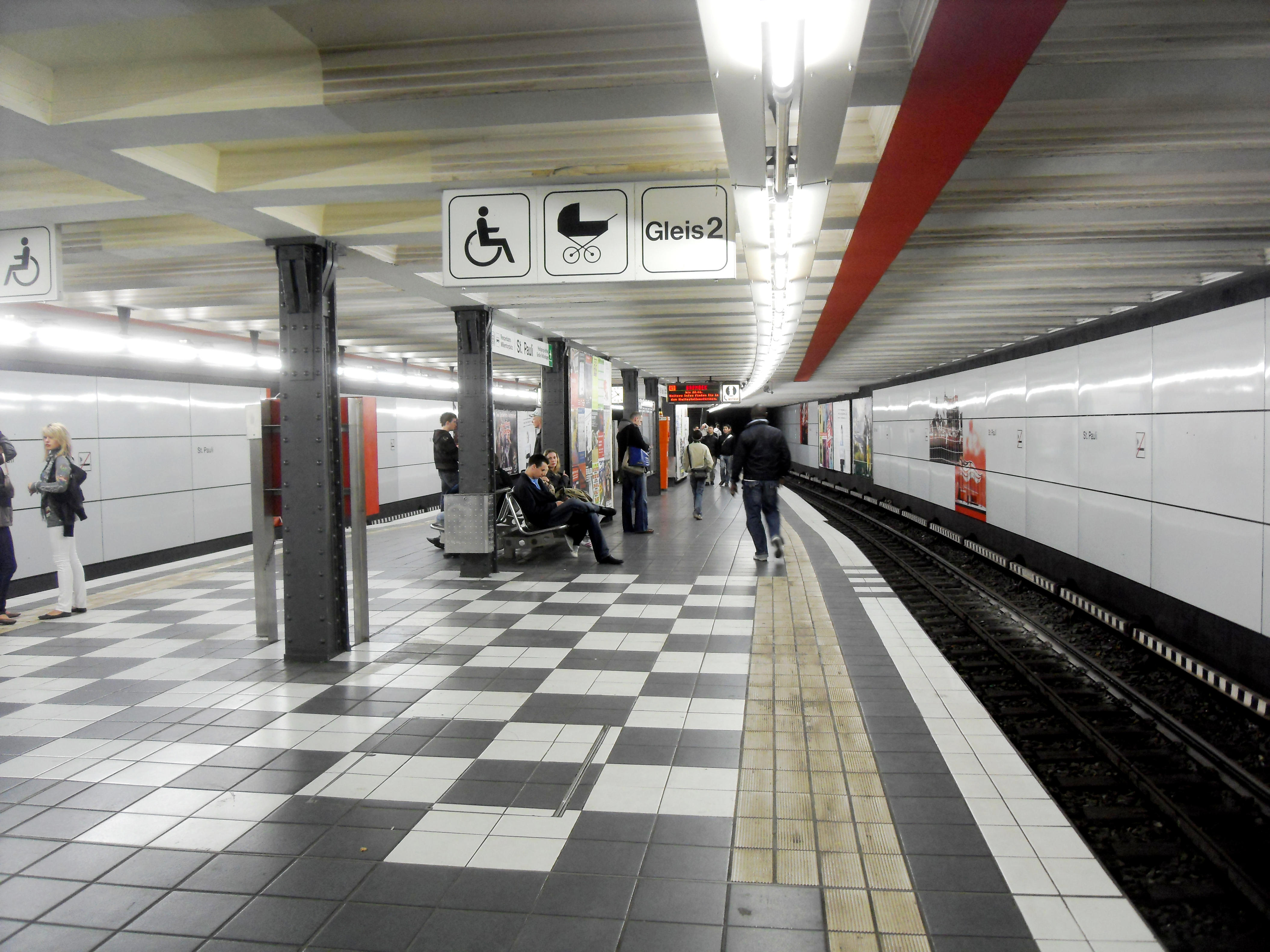
- Platform of St. Pauli station

General information
- Location: Millerntorplatz; 20359 Hamburg, Germany
- Coordinates: 53°33′01″N 09°58′12″E
- System: Hamburg U-Bahn station
- Operator: Hamburger Hochbahn AG
- Line: U3
- Platforms: 1 island platform
- Tracks: 2

Construction
- Structure type: Underground
- Accessible: Yes

Other information
- Station code: HHA: PA
- Fare zone: HVV: A/000 and 101

History
- Opened: 25 May 1912; 114 years ago
- Former names: 1912-1935 Millerntor

Services
Preceding station	Hamburg U-Bahn	Following station
Feldstraße towards Barmbek	U3	Landungsbrücken towards Wandsbek-Gartenstadt
Location
- Location within Hamburg Location within Schleswig-Holstein Location within Germany Location within Europe

St. Pauli station is a metro station located in St. Pauli, Hamburg, Germany close to the Reeperbahn. The station was opened in 1912 is served by the Hamburg U-Bahn line U3 (Ring line). St.Pauli station is often used by passengers travelling to the Hamburger Dom fair at Heiligengeistfeld, as it is located closely to its southern entrance.

== Services ==
St. Pauli is served by line U3 of Hamburg U-Bahn.

== See also ==
- List of Hamburg U-Bahn stations
