= Hadi Teherani =

German-Iranian architect and designer

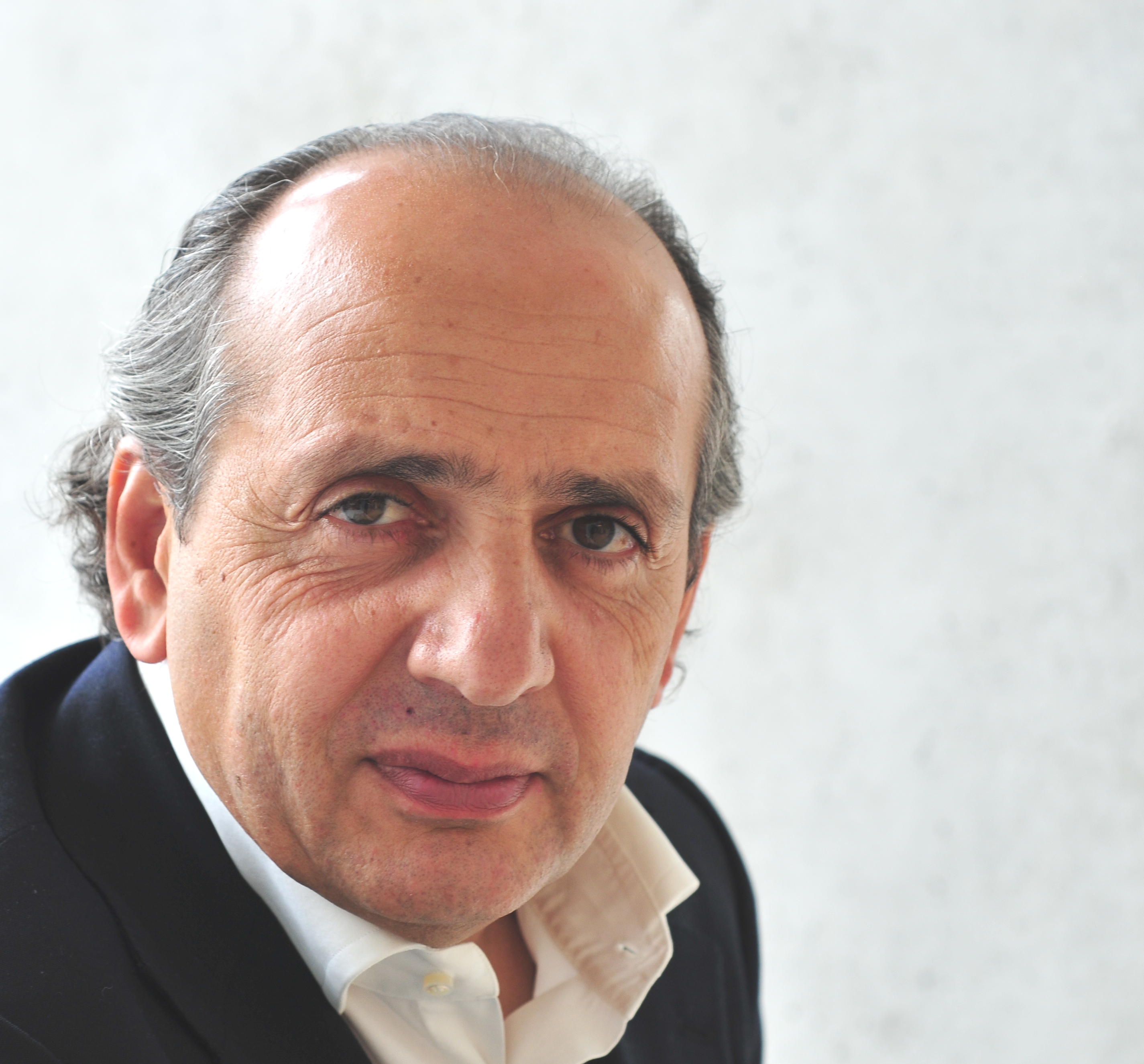
- Teherani in 2011
- Born: February 2, 1954 (age 72); Tehran, Imperial State of Iran

Hadi Teherani (born 2 February 1954) is an Iranian-German architect and designer who lives in Hamburg, Germany.

== Biography ==
Hadi Teherani was born in Tehran, Iran, and moved to Germany with his family when he was 6 years old. He did his school in Hamburg and continued his study in Architecture at Braunschweig University of Technology from 1977 to 1984. He taught from 1989 to 1991 at Aachen’s Technical University. He began his career as a fashion designer in Cologne before starting as a professional architect. He founded the architecture office BRT with his colleagues Bothe, Richter in 1991 additionally, he founded the design company under his own name, Hadi Teherani AG, in 2003 for his designing plans and ideas. He is a member of the Free Academy of Arts Hamburg (in German: Freien Akademie der Künste Hamburg) since 1999. Hadi Teherani also runs his own business branches in Moscow, Dubai, Bangalore and Abu Dhabi. He is the part of the jury members of Design Educates Awards in Germany.

== Works and philosophy ==
Hadi Teherani works not only as an architect but also in the area of product and interior design. Not only the architectural space is his goal, but the dense atmospheric, until all equipment details are designed in the space. In cooperation with various manufacturers Teherani furnishings, textile coverings or wall surfaces realized for its buildings due to his architectural language.

The catalog of the designer Hadi Teherani ranges from office chair range ("Silver" / Interstuhl 262S office swivel chair 2004), more seating, sideboards, a mobile office module, lights, door and window fittings, various rug collections, wallpaper and sanitary objects down to the kitchen (+ ARTESIO / Poggenpohl 2010) and a bicycle (e-bike Teherani Hadi, 2011). One of the key factors in the success of Teherani, is the abundant use of glass in buildings and his designs. In the majority of his works we can see glasses as the main factor from the floor to ceiling, because he believes that three factors are very important in the structure: light, air and the view of the room. He tries by using the glass bring the building up to the highest standards.

About the philosophy of his works he believes: “I was consistently confronted with the holistic challenge to exceed the boundaries of design. Architecture provides the basic foundation for a spatial idea. Only the complex implementation of a design idea from the smallest details, to the establishment of emotionally attuned space or the identities of entire companies, can solve the great task of realising a comprehensive design concept…”. Many products and projects of Hadi Teherani Design AG have been nominated and received numerous awards such as FIABCI Award, MIPIM Awards 2003, 2007 to 2009, 2014 LEAF Award, CityScape Award and ARX Award.

Beside interest of designing large structures and buildings Teherani also designs everyday life items, from furniture to small items.

== Structures ==
Headquarter Tobias Grau in Rellingen

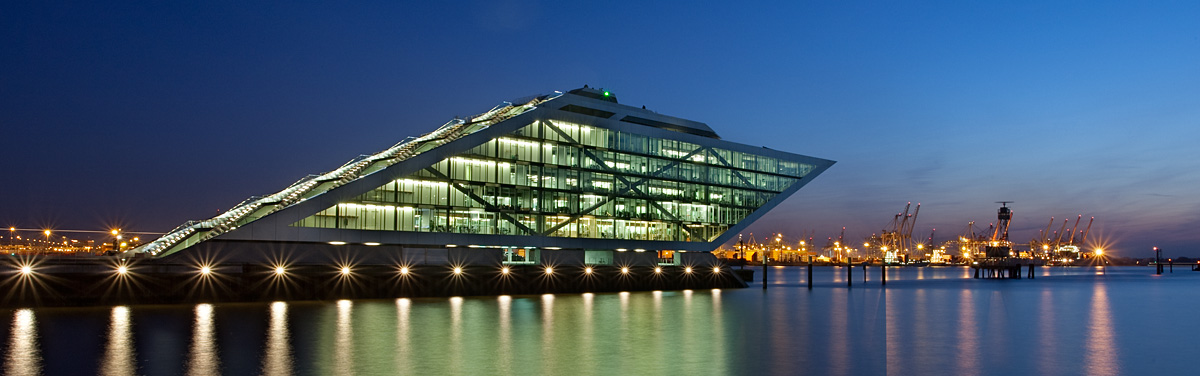
Dockland office building, Hamburg

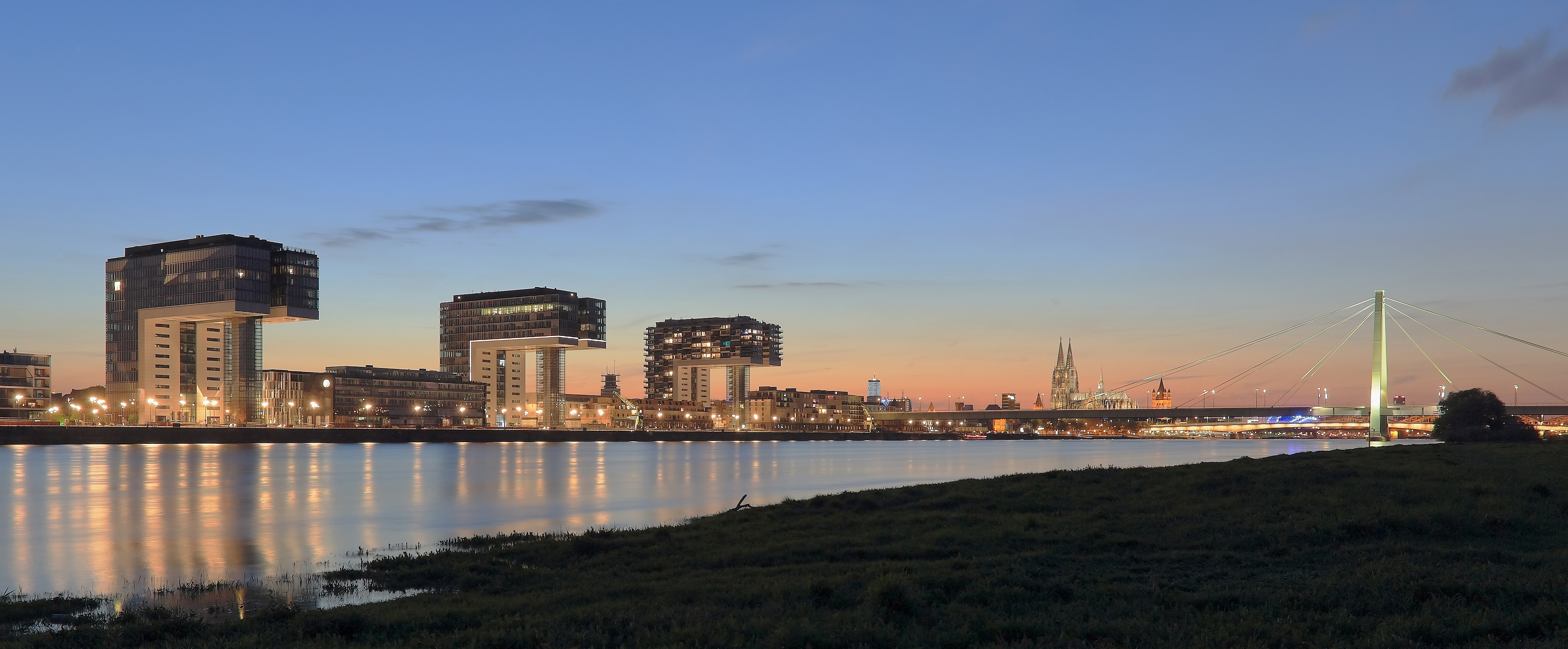
Kranhaus, Cologne

Following is a list of structures which have been designed by Teherani:

- Headquarter Tobias Grau in Rellingen, 1998 (extended 2001)
- Germany headquarters of Swiss Re in Munich-Unterfoehring
- Double X skyscraper in Hamburg
- Berliner Bogen at Berliner Tor in Hamburg
- Dockland office building in Hamburg
- Europa Passage in Hamburg
- Elbberg Campus, Hamburg-Altona
- Frankfurt Airport long-distance station
- Crane House, an ensemble of two office buildings and a residential building in Cologne Rheinauhafen, which is modeled harbor cranes
- Zayed University in Abu Dhabi, 2011
- Dancing Towers in Hamburg, completed in 2012
- Lodha Altamount in Mumbai, India
