= Hamburger Dom =

Fun fair in Hamburg, Germany

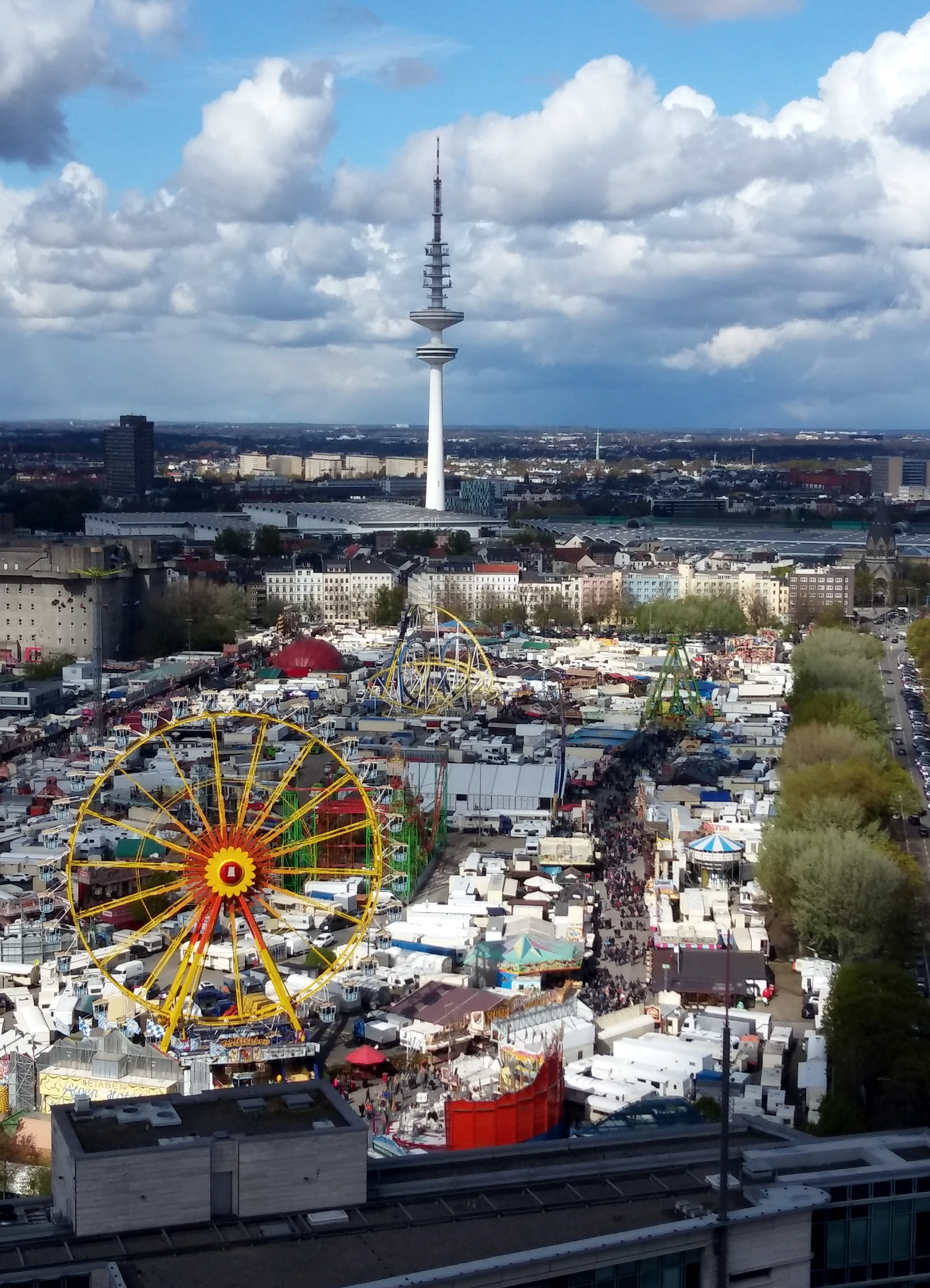
- Hamburger Dom in 2017
- Status: Active
- Genre: Volksfest (folk festival)
- Frequency: Three times a year
- Locations: Heiligengeistfeld, Hamburg
- Coordinates: 53°33′14″N 9°58′15″E
- Country: Germany
- Years active: 1329–present
- Inaugurated: 1329
- Attendance: Around 10 million annually
- Organiser: City of Hamburg
- Website: www.hamburg.de/freizeit/dom

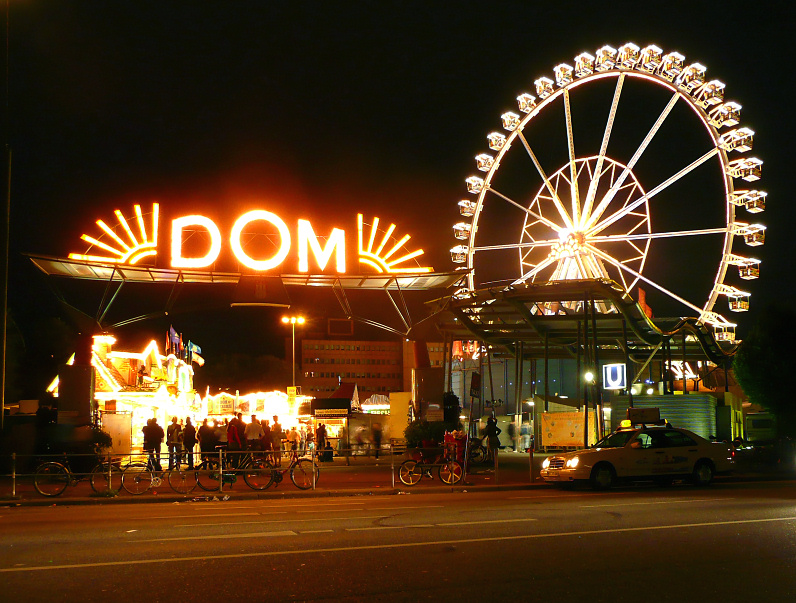
Entrance of Hamburger Dom at night in 2008.

The Hamburger Dom is a large fair held at the Heiligengeistfeld fair ground in central Hamburg, Germany. With three fairs (spring, summer and winter) per year it is the biggest and the longest fair throughout Germany and attracts approximately ten million visitors per year. It is also referred to as a Volksfest (beer festival and travelling funfair). The Hamburger Dom is also one of the well known festivals in the Hamburg metropolitan area.

Hamburger Dom puts on a firework display at the Heiligengeistfeld, that can be seen across most of the city, every Friday that it runs at 22:30 hrs.

On the Winterdom 2021 was a laser-show set up for the first time.

== History ==
A market in or in front of Hamburg's Cathedral (German: Hamburger Dom) was first recorded in 1329, at the beginning only in special seasons like Christmas. With the Protestant Reformation in the 16th century the fair was also held at other times. After the demolition of the cathedral (1804–1807), the market was held on the Gänsemarkt (lit. geese market) in 1804, but kept the name “Dom”. Since 1892, the fair has been held at Heiligengeistfeld (lit. field of the Holy Spirit) and the name was used for all fairs at this location.

- Winterdom or Dommarkt (winter fair or cathedral market): 30 days in late autumn
- Sommerdom or Hummelfest (summer fair or Hummel market): since 1947: 31 days during summer
- Frühlingsdom (spring fair): since 1948, 30 days in spring

== Crane collision ==
On 14 August 1981, a crane collided with the Skylab carousel at the fair, killing seven and injuring fifteen.
