= Heiligengeistfeld =

Area in Hamburg

Coordinates: 53°33′14″N 9°58′14″E

Location of Heiligengeistfeld in Hamburg

Map showing the Heiligengeistfeld

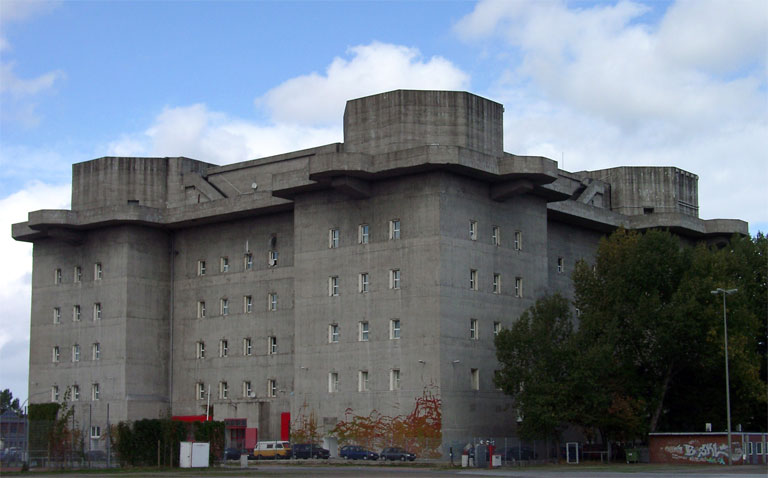
Former Flakturm IV on Heiligengeistfeld

Heiligengeistfeld (German: "Holy Ghost Field") is an area of Hamburg in the St. Pauli quarter. The Hamburger Dom funfair has been held there since 1893. When the area is not used for exhibitions, circuses or the Dom it is a car park. A building from Deutsche Telekom, a swimming complex, Millerntor-Stadion, a school, a patrol station, a World War II building (Flakturm IV) and a supermarket are permanent structures on the field.

== History ==
The area was named after a hospital in 1497, forming a kind of green as part of the hospital's endowment to make up for its maintenance. The area has been used for exhibitions since 1863.

With the intensifying Allied bombing of Hamburg the "Flak tower" Flakturm IV structure was erected on Heiligengeistfeld starting in 1942. It was both an anti-aircraft gun emplacement and air-raid shelter. The massive concrete structure is still standing.

The area is noteworthy in music history for being the location where German photographer Astrid Kirchherr first photographed the Beatles in 1960 during their first bookings in Hamburg.
